= List of foreigners who were in the service of the Ottoman Empire =

This is an incomplete list that refers to those who were not from the Ottoman Empire, but later served the country. This may be militarily, as a diplomat, a spy, or any other way. Foreigners employed by the Sublime Porte were often renegades, slaves and refugees. They were diverse in their ethnic origins, generally hailing from aristocratic families.

Italian historian Giancarlo Casale posits that it was the ability of the Ottomans to "accommodate diversity" and "embrace it fully as their own" which attracted foreigners to the country. Those who converted to Islam in general, but especially while in the service of the Ottoman state, were considered by Christendom to have 'turned Turk'.

The increased prevalence of foreign military officers in the Ottoman Empire after the mid-1800s is owed to the fact that non-Muslims were no longer required to convert to Islam to serve in the Ottoman army after the passing of the 1856 Reform Edict. However, there are numerous notable cases before the Edict where conversion to Islam was not required. An example is Sinan 'The Great Jew', regarded as the right-hand man of famed Grand Admiral, Hayreddin Barbarossa.

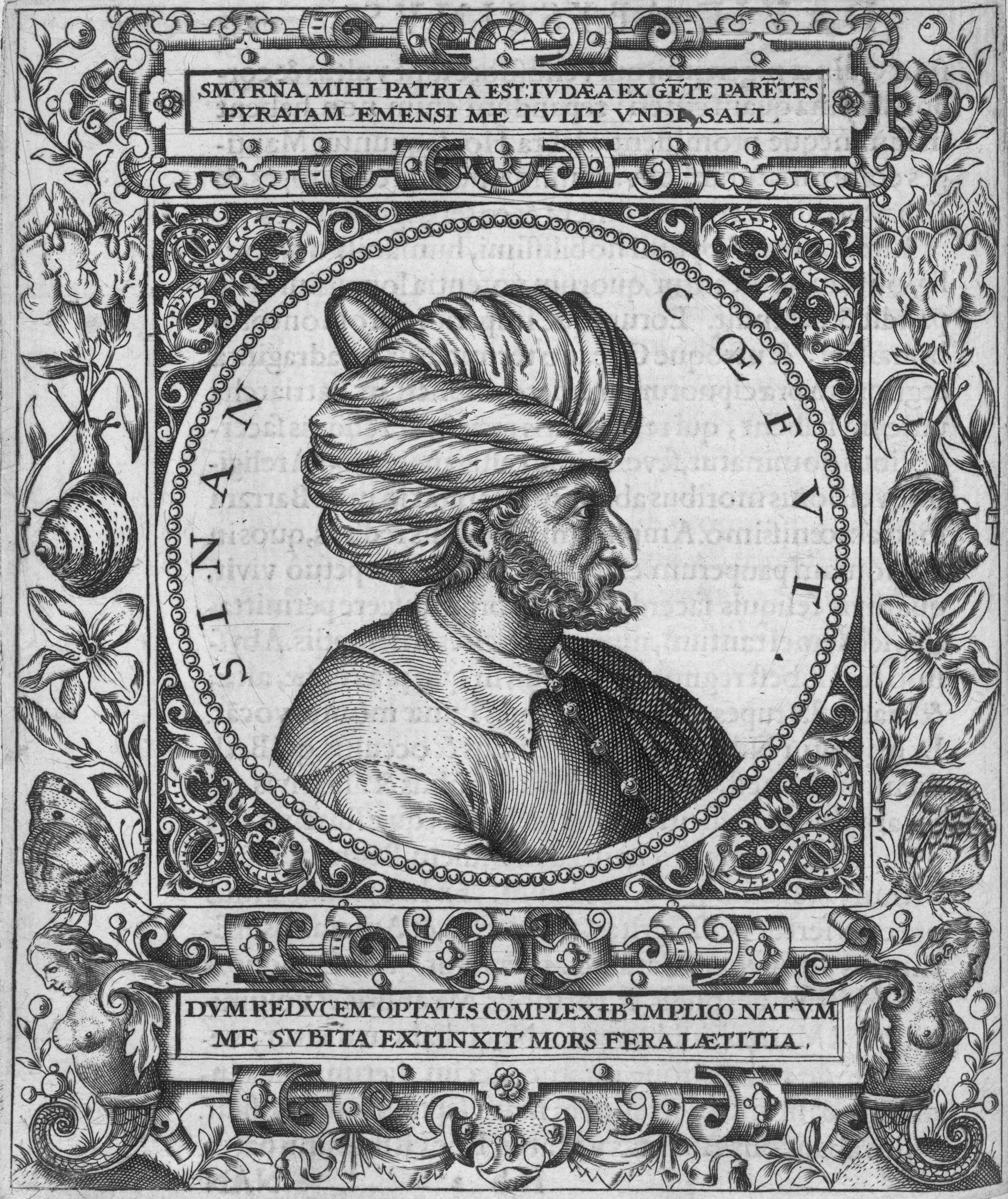
Sinan 'The Great Jew' by Johann Theodor de Bry, 1590s

== List of notables ==
This is a list of noteworthy foreigners who were in the service of the Ottoman Empire. This list only includes individuals who were born outside the Ottoman Empire and served the country in some capacity; it does not include those of non-Turkish ethnic origin who were born within the empire and served the country.

This is not an exhaustive list and is therefore subject to additions.

=== 14th century ===
- Köse Mihal, Greek renegade to the Ottoman Empire who was previously a Byzantine governor. He accompanied Osman I in his ascent to power and founding the Ottoman Empire. May have been of imperial Palaiologos descent
- Lala Şahin Pasha, Christian renegade to the Ottoman Empire who is possibly of Bulgarian origins. One of the leaders of the Ottoman campaign into Thrace

=== 15th century ===
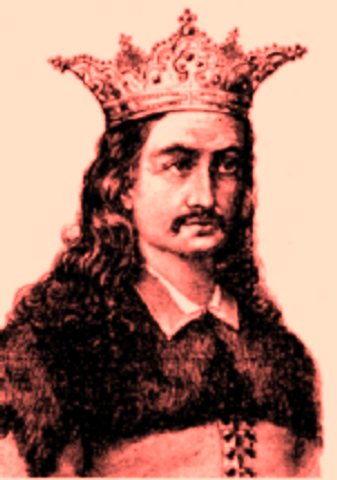
Radu the Handsome

- Radu the Handsome, Wallachian noble who converted to Islam and led Ottoman forces against his brother Vlad the Impaler
- Evrenos, Greek noble Byzantine military commander with an extremely long career in the Ottoman army. He participated in many battles (such as the 1396 Battle of Nicopolis) alongside Süleyman Pasha, Murad I, Bayezid I, Süleyman Çelebi, and Mehmed I. This is a period of over 70 years
- Orban, Hungarian inventor of massive cannons which would heavily damage the walls of Constantinople during the 1453 siege
- Suleiman Baltoghlu, Bulgarian admiral who is known for the role he played in the 1453 Fall of Constantinople
- Yakup Pasha, Jewish-Italian royal physician of Sultans Murad II to Mehmed II
- Johann Schiltberger, German noble who was a military slave for over 6 years after being captured at the 1396 Battle of Nicopolis
- Giovanni Maria Angiolello, Italian traveller who was a military slave for 12 years after being captured at the 1470 Siege of Negroponte

=== 16th century ===
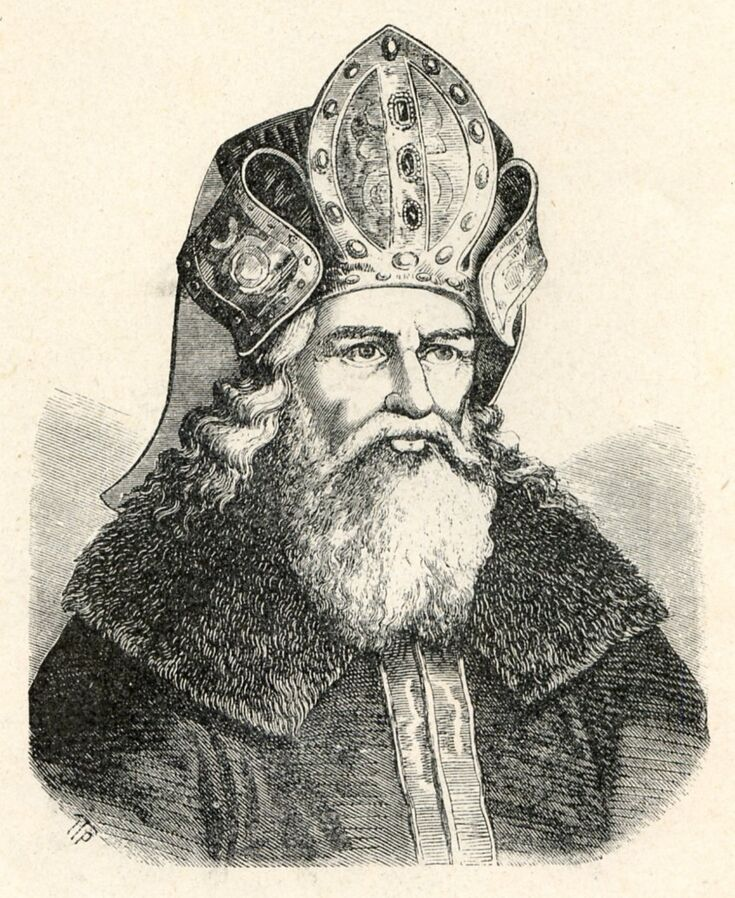
Joachim Strasz

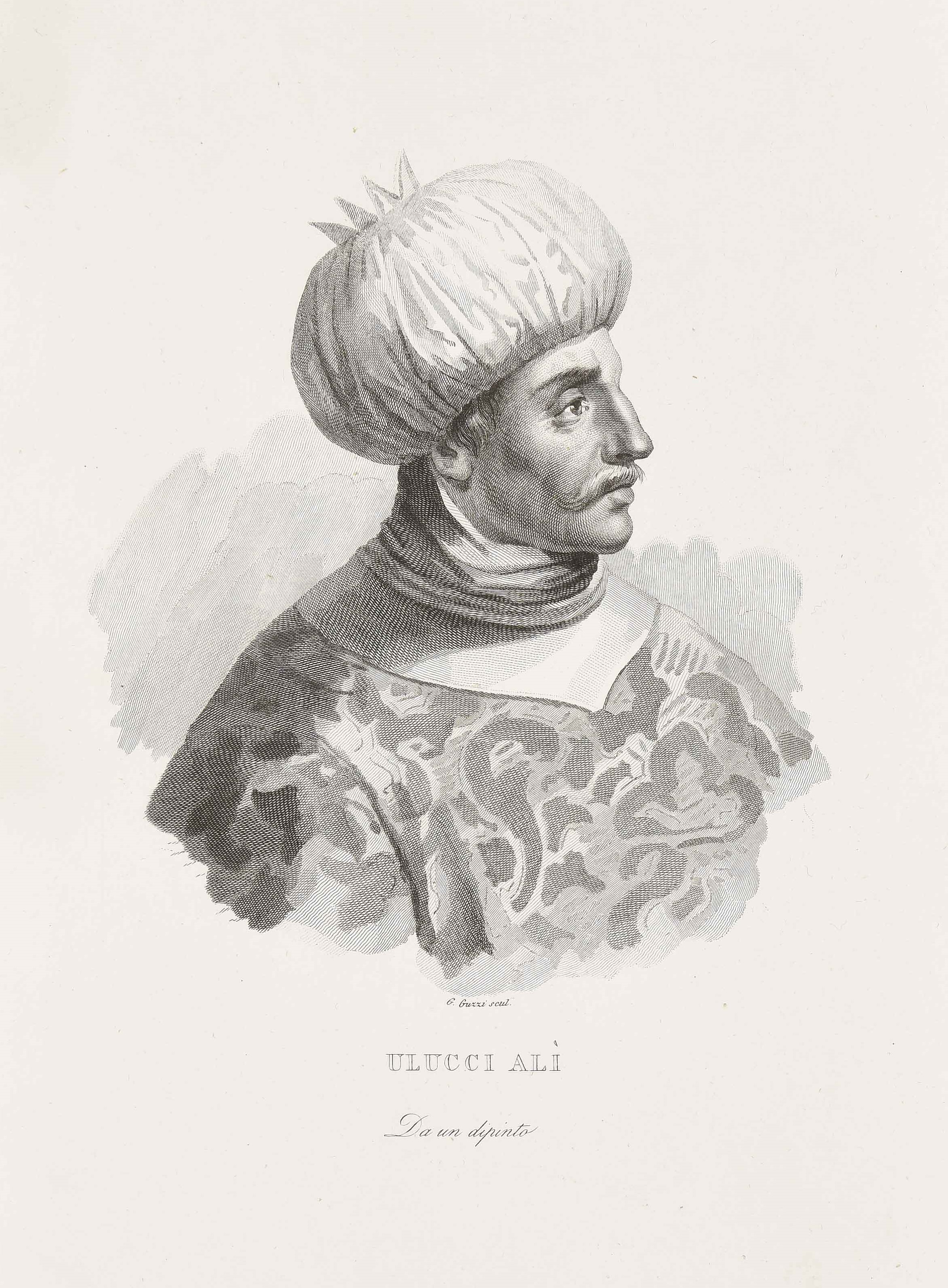
Occhiali

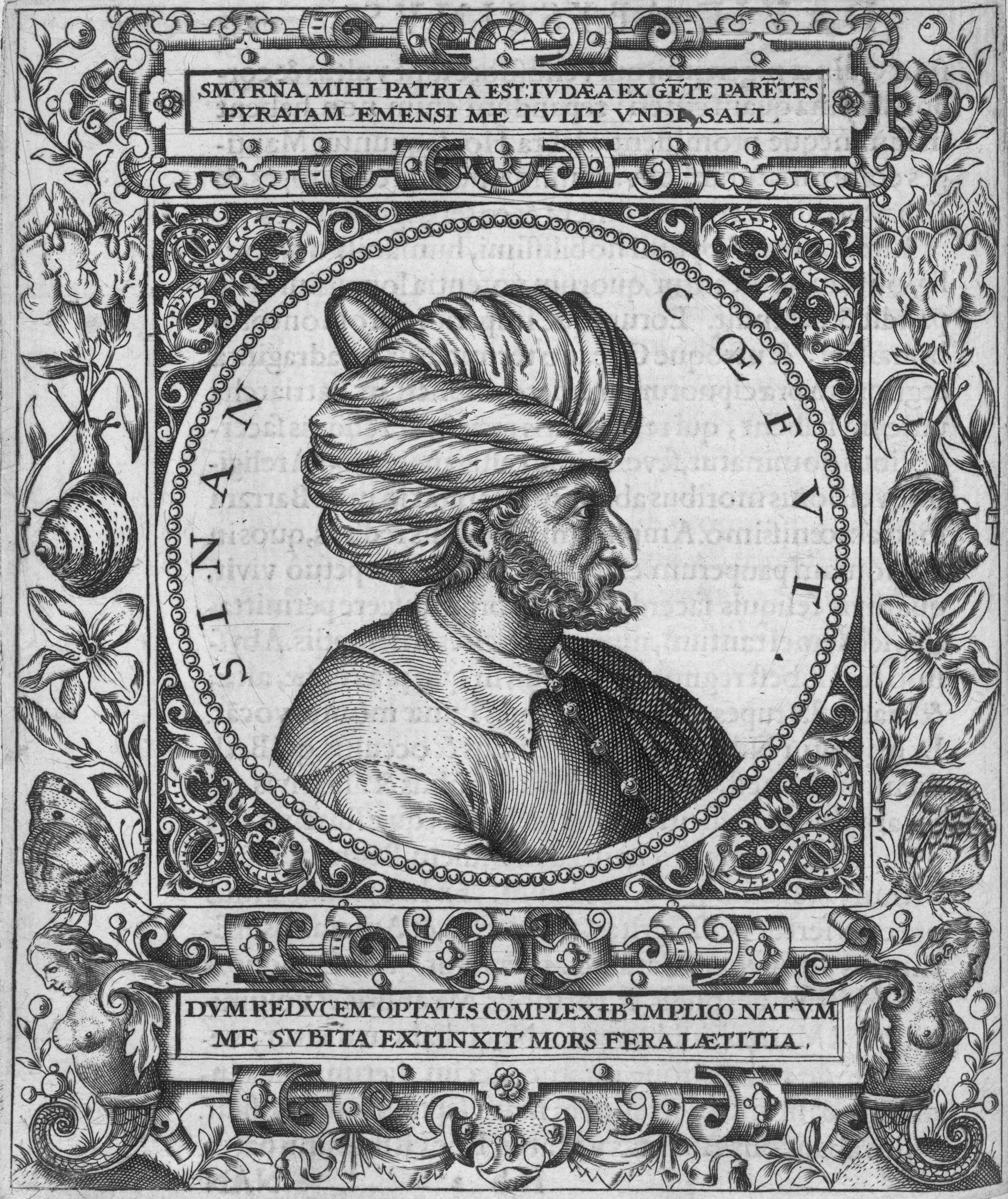
Sinan Reis

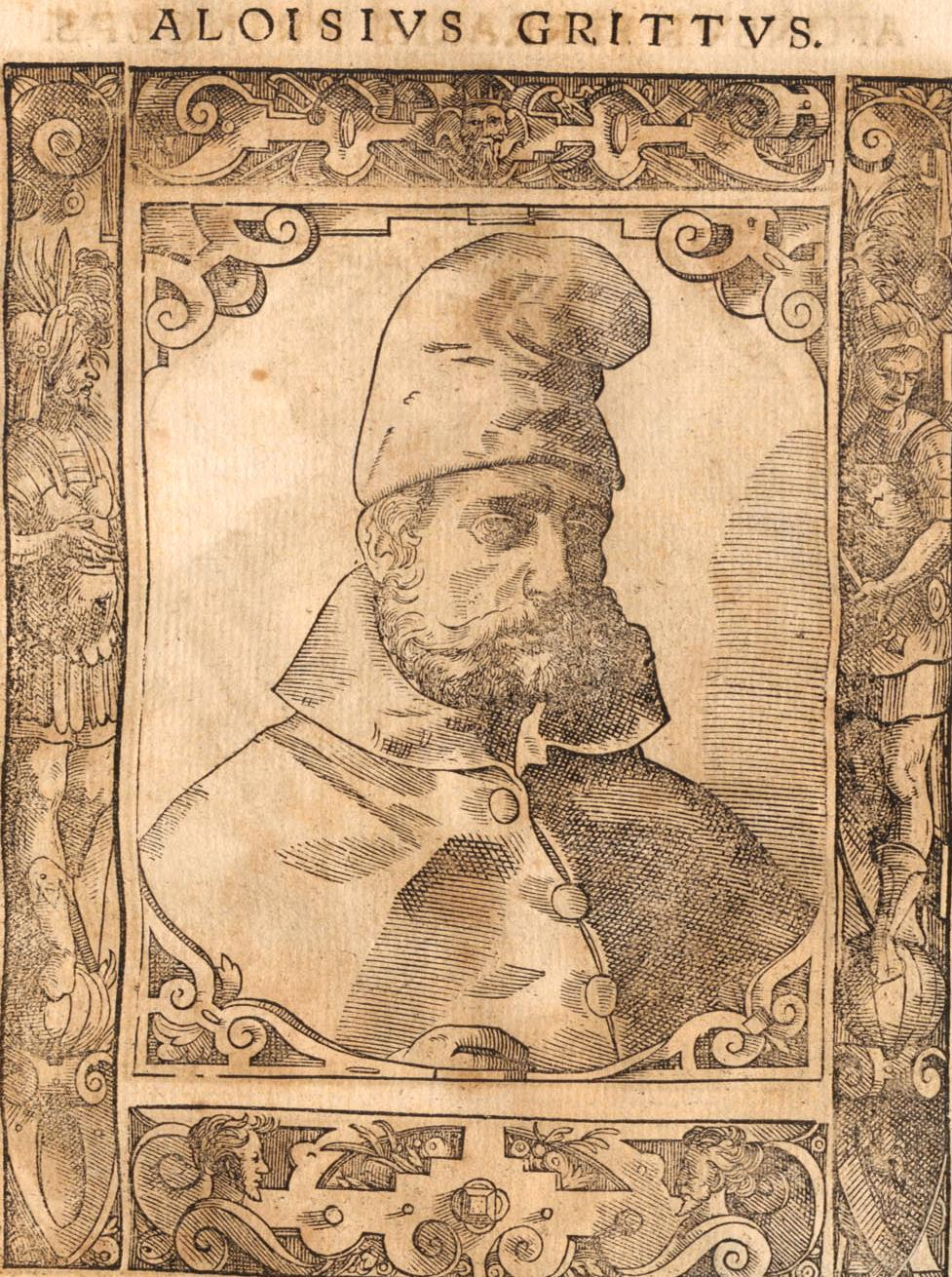
Alvise Gritti

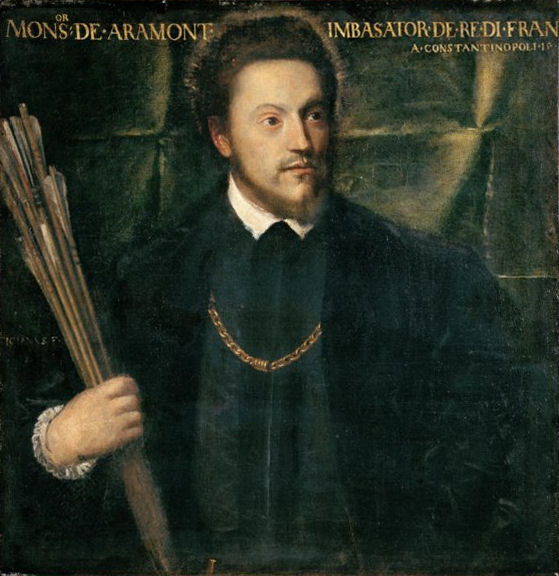
Gabriel de Luetz

- Joachim Strasz, Polish who served as Grand Dragoman from 1551 until his death in 1571
- Occhiali, Italian admiral who later became beylerbey of the Regency of Algiers and Kapudan Pasha of the Ottoman fleet
- Sinan Reis, Jewish-Spanish Barbary Corsair who served in the Ottoman navy for 30 to 40 years and engaged in several key battles against the Spanish and the Holy Roman Empire
- Alvise Gritti, Italian politician who served as an Ottoman minister and operated spy networks for the sultan. Son of Andrea Gritti, Doge of Venice
- Gabriel de Luetz, French ambassador to the Sublime Porte who participated in two wars of the Ottoman Empire
- Hass Murad Pasha, Greek renegade of imperial Palaiologos descent who served as an Ottoman commander and statesman. Brother of Mesih Pasha
- Mesih Pasha, Greek renegade of imperial Palaiologos descent who served as Kapudan Pasha and Grand Vizier. Brother of Hass Murad Pasha
- Adam Neuser, German former Protestant pastor who would flee to the Ottoman Empire, convert to Islam, and serve as a spy
- Markus Penckner, Transylvanian renegade and convert to Islam who would serve as a spy for the Ottomans
- Jácome de Olivares, Cochin Jewish businessman who served as a spy for Sultan Selim II in Portuguese India
- Strongilah, Karaite Jewish businesswoman who was the Kira (business agent) of Hafsa Sultan and Hürrem Sultan
- Esther Handali, Jewish-Spanish businesswoman who was the Kira of Hürrem Sultan and later Nurbanu Sultan and then Safiye Sultan besides being a financial advisor to Sultan Murad III
- Joseph Nasi, Jewish-Portuguese businessman and diplomat. He also served as a financial advisor to multiple Sultans.
- Jozef Hamon, Jewish royal physician to Bayezid II and Selim I. Father of Moses Hamon
- Moses Hamon, Jewish royal physician to Suleiman the Magnificent
- Payzen Yusuf Pasha, French statesman who became Agha of the Janissaries and the beylerbey of Budin and Temeşvar
- Pál Márkházy, Hungarian noble who served as governor of multiple Sanjaks
- Samson Rowlie, English renegade who served as Chief eunuch and treasurer of Ottoman Algeria
- Hasan Agha, Italian renegade who ruled Algiers in the absence of Hayreddin Barbarossa. He commanded the garrison of the city during the 1541 invasion, resulting in catastrophic losses for Holy Roman Emperor Charles V
- Hasan Corso, Italian renegade who was kaymakam of Algiers from 1549 until his assassination in 1556
- Cafer Ağa, Italian who was Kapudan Pasha from 1516 to 1520
- Hassan Veneziano, Italian regent of Ottoman Algiers from 1577 to 1580, and then 1582–1587
- Bertrand d'Ornesan, French admiral who fought alongside the Ottomans at the 1537 Siege of Corfu
- Hayır Bey, Abkhazian governor of the Mamluk Sultanate who supported the Ottoman invasion of the country
- Abraham de Castro, Jewish financialist who served as the head of the mint for Selim I and played an active role in the Cairo Purim
- Chirana, Italian spy who served at the Ottoman court

=== 17th century ===
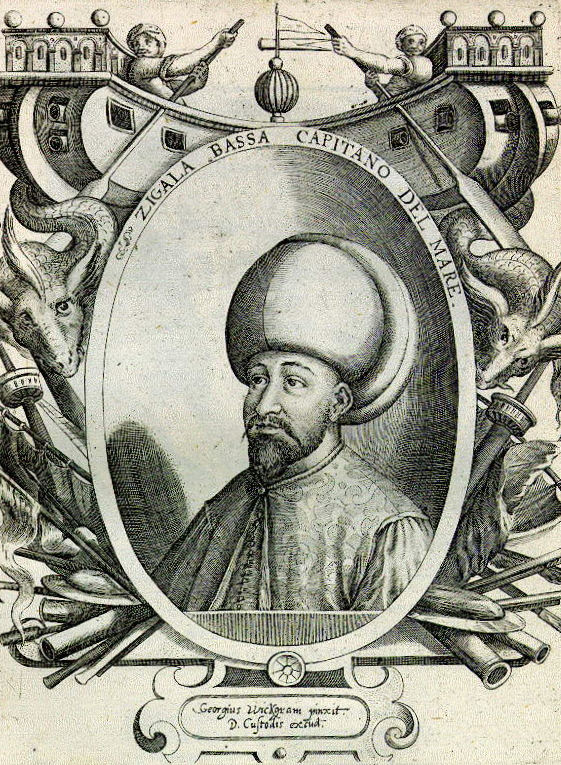
Cığalazade Yusuf Sinan Pasha

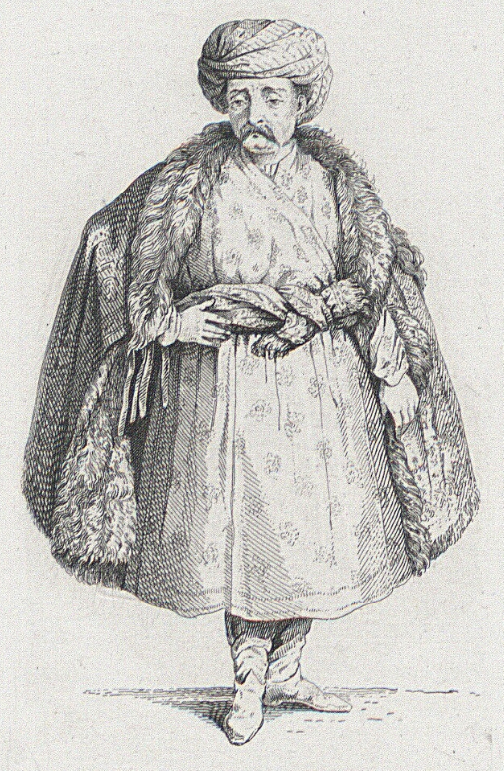
Wojciech Bobowski

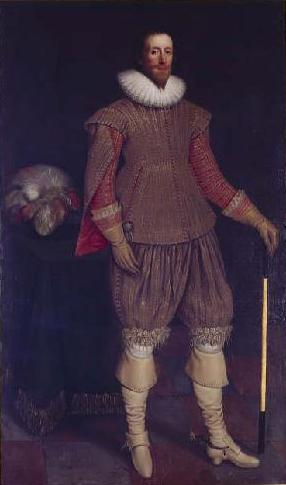
Francis Verney

- Cığalazade Yusuf Sinan Pasha, Italian renegade to the Ottoman Empire who would serve as Grand Vizier and Kapudan Pasha. As one of the most capable military commander and statesman of the early modern age, he contributed to the eastwards expansion of the empire, and successfully defended Ottoman Hungary from Habsburg invasion
- Wojciech Bobowski, Polish musician and Dragoman who mastered 17 languages. He served in the Ottoman state for nearly 40 years
- Francis Verney, English adventurer who became one of the leading Barbary corsairs. Close friend of Jack Ward
- Jack Ward, English Barbary Corsair operating out of Ottoman Tunisia for over 20 years. Inspiration for Jack Sparrow of the Pirates of the Caribbean film franchise
- Robert Walsingham, English Barbary Corsair who served as a captain of an Ottoman man-of-war
- Solomon Aben Yaesh, Jewish-Portuguese statesman who is regarded as one of the most influential figures in Ottoman foreign affairs history
- Solomon Eskenazi, Jewish-German statesman who is regarded as one of the most influential figures in Ottoman foreign affairs history
- David Passi, Jewish spy and closest confidant of Sultan Murad III. He served as Kapudan Pasha between 1595/6 to 1599
- Gazanfer Agha, Italian politician who served in the Ottoman court for 37 years
- Moses bin Jehuda Bebri, Jewish diplomat who served as the Ottoman ambassador to Sweden
- Carlo Cigala, Italian spy who regularly gave information on Spain to the Ottoman Sultan. He was the younger brother of Cığalazade Yusuf Sinan Pasha
- Esperanza Malchi, Jewish-Italian businesswoman who was the Kira (business agent) of Valide Safiye Sultan and financial advisor to Sultan Murad III
- Sarı Kenan Pasha, Russian statesman who served as Kapudan Pasha and served as governor in multiple states
- Zymen Danseker, Dutch Barbary Corsair based in Ottoman Algeria who commanded a vast squadron made up of English and Turks
- Sulayman Reis, Dutch Barbary Corsair who commanded the Algiers corsair fleet during his later years
- Jan Janszoon, Dutch Barbary Corsair operating out of Ottoman Algeria for over 20 years
- Usta Murad, Italian renegade who served in the Ottoman navy for nearly 50 years. He became Dey of Tunis 3 years before his death
- Ali Bitchin, Italian renegade who made a fortune in Algiers from privateering with the Ottoman navy
- Frenk Cafer Pasha, Italian renegade who served as Kapudan Pasha for 3 years and served in the Ottoman navy for decades
- Mikołaj Chabielski, Polish noble who was a military slave for 18 years after being captured during Jan Zamoyski's expedition to Moldavia in 1595
- Beatrice Michiel, Italian spy who served in the Ottoman court

=== 18th century ===
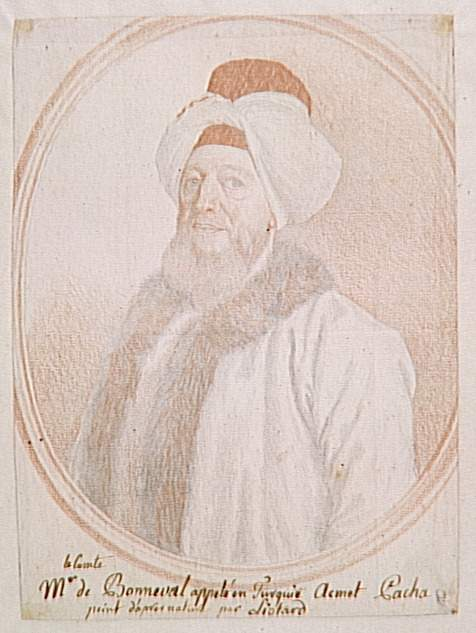
Claude Alexandre, Count of Bonneval

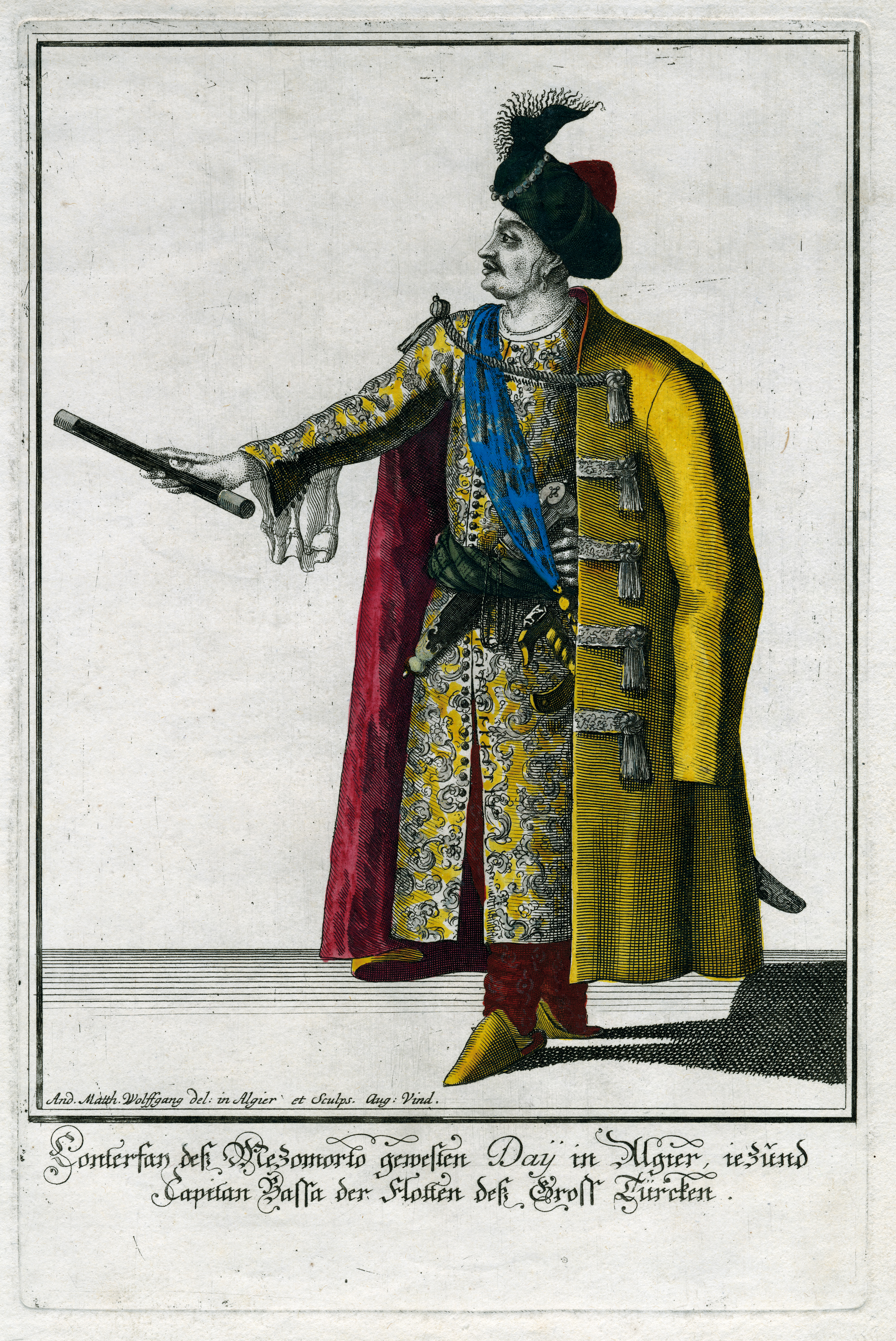
Mezzo Morto Hüseyin Pasha

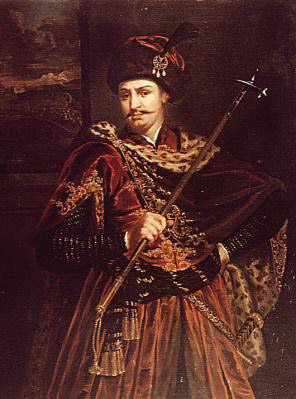
Emeric Thököly

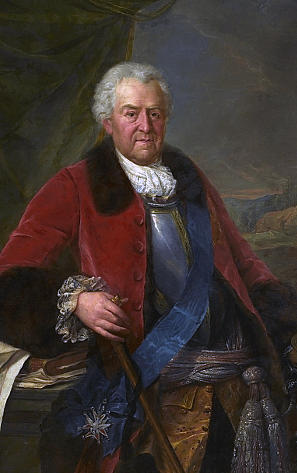
Stanisław Poniatowski

- Claude Alexandre de Bonneval, French count who was a renegade in the Ottoman Empire. Served in the Ottoman army and state in the last decades of his life
- Mezzo Morto Hüseyin Pasha, Spanish privateer and renegade who served as the Dey of Algiers and Kapudan Pasha
- Emeric Thököly, Hungarian prince who was an important ally for the Ottomans in Central Europe. He helped the Ottomans in many of their battles such as the 1683 Battle of Vienna
- Stanisław Poniatowski, Polish noble who fought with the Ottomans during the 1710–1711 Pruth River Campaign against Russia
- François Baron de Tott, French aristocrat of Slovak-Hungarian origin who played a great role in the 1768–1774 Russo-Turkish war and was pivotal in the modernisation of the Ottoman army
- Campbell Mustafa Ağa, Scottish convert to Islam who from 1775 was the chief instructor in the new Ottoman naval mathematical academy (the Hendishâne)
- Antoine Le Picard de Phélippeaux, French military engineer who helped fortify Acre against the invasion of his lifelong enemy Napoleon
- Frenk Abdurrahman Pasha, French or Italian who served as Kapudan Pasha from 1704 to 1706 and participated in numerous naval battles and raids
- Aaron ben Isaac Hamon, Jewish doctor and printer who served as physician to the Ottoman royal court
- Daniel de Fonseca, Jewish-Portuguese who irregularly served as royal physician from the early to mid 1700s
- Hark Olufs, Danish who was a slave servant to Ottoman Algerian aristocrats for 11 years
- Sheikh Mansur, Chechen Islamic and military leader who fought with the Ottomans in the 1787–1792 Russo-Turkish war
- André-Joseph Lafitte-Clavé, French military engineer who from 1784 to 1788 helped train Ottoman soldiers in naval warfare and fortification building
- Antoine-Charles Aubert, French engineer who accompanied Lafitte-Clavé in the modernisation of the Ottoman army
- Salomea Halpir, Polish female medic of Russian-Jewish descent who was the personal physician of many Ottoman officials from 1732 to 1739. She is considered the first Polish and Lithuanian female doctor

=== 19th century ===
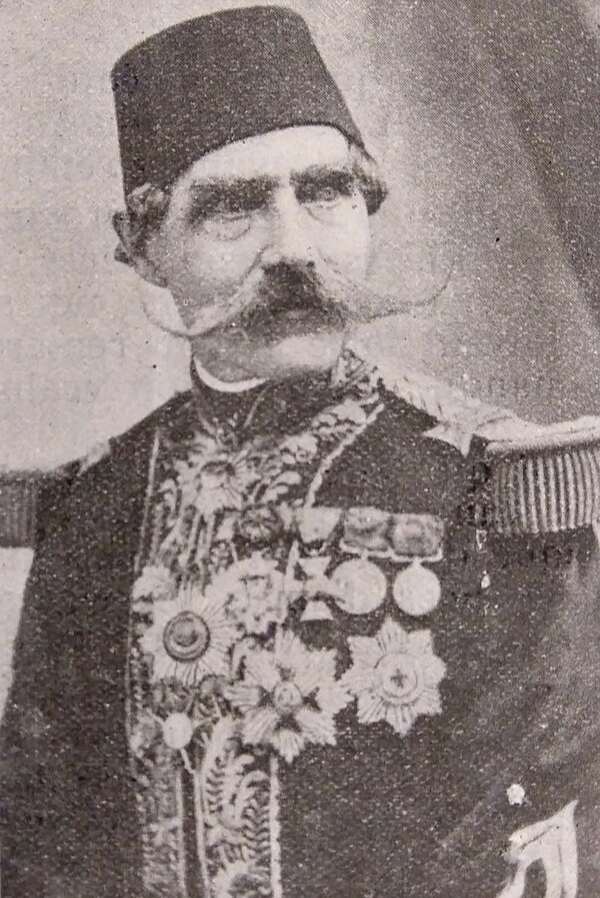
Charles de Schwartzenberg

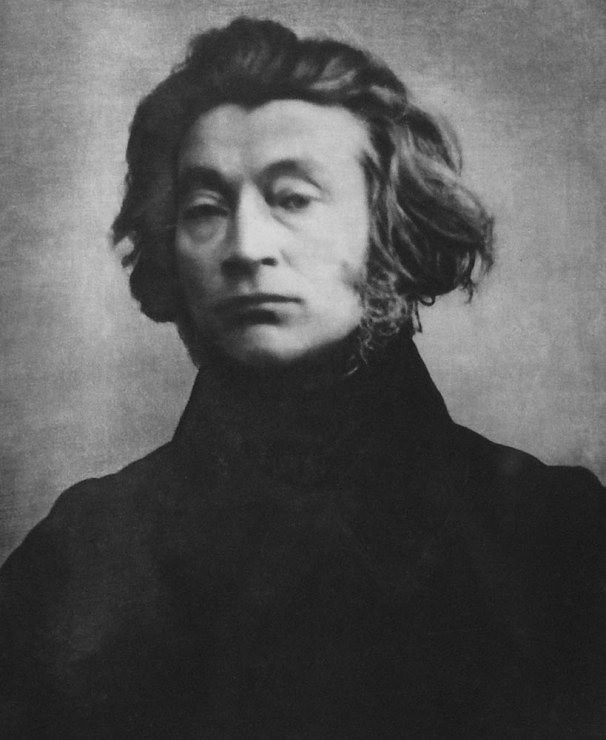
Adam Mickiewicz

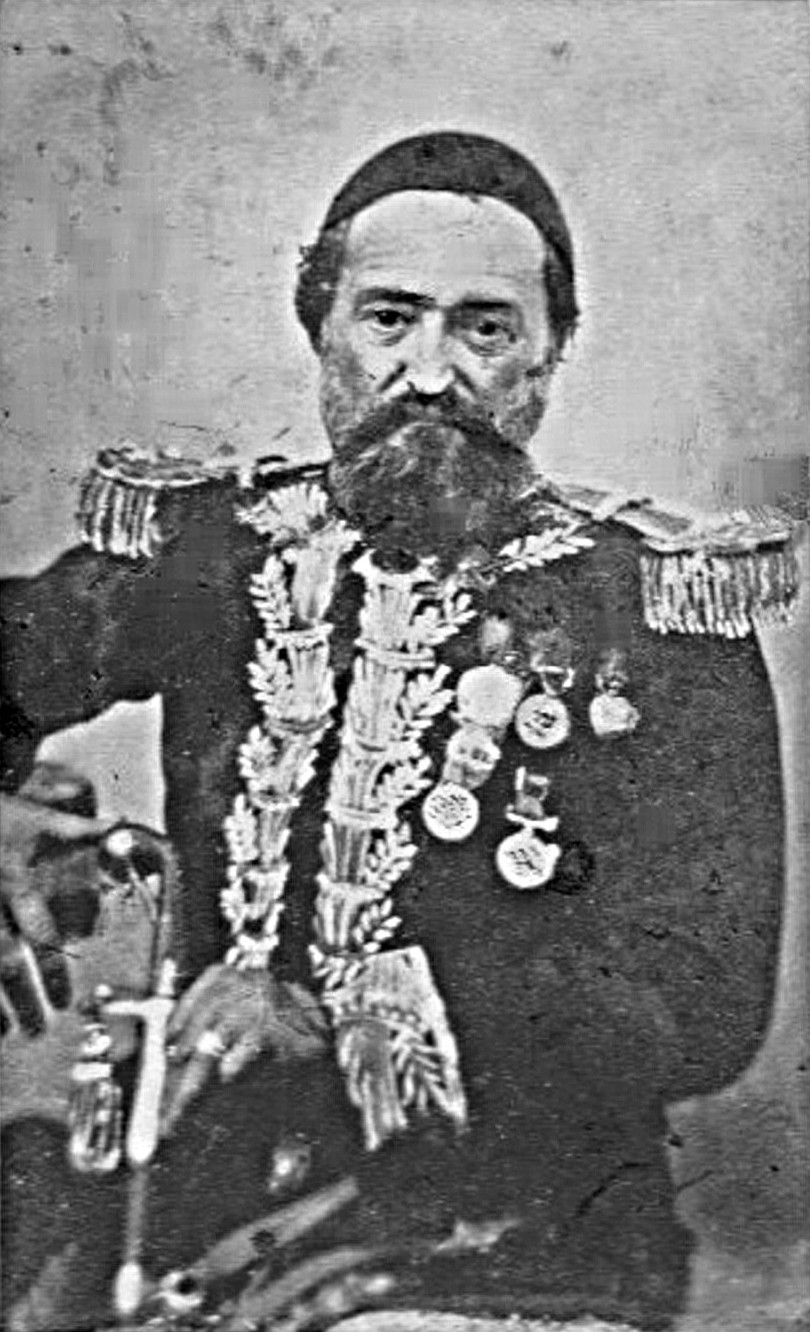
Antoni Aleksander Iliński

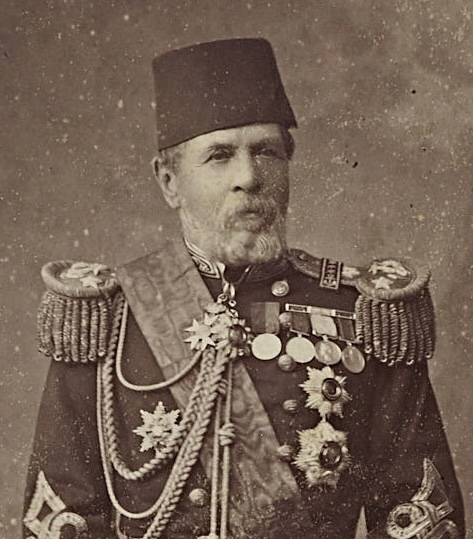
Augustus Charles Hobart-Hampden

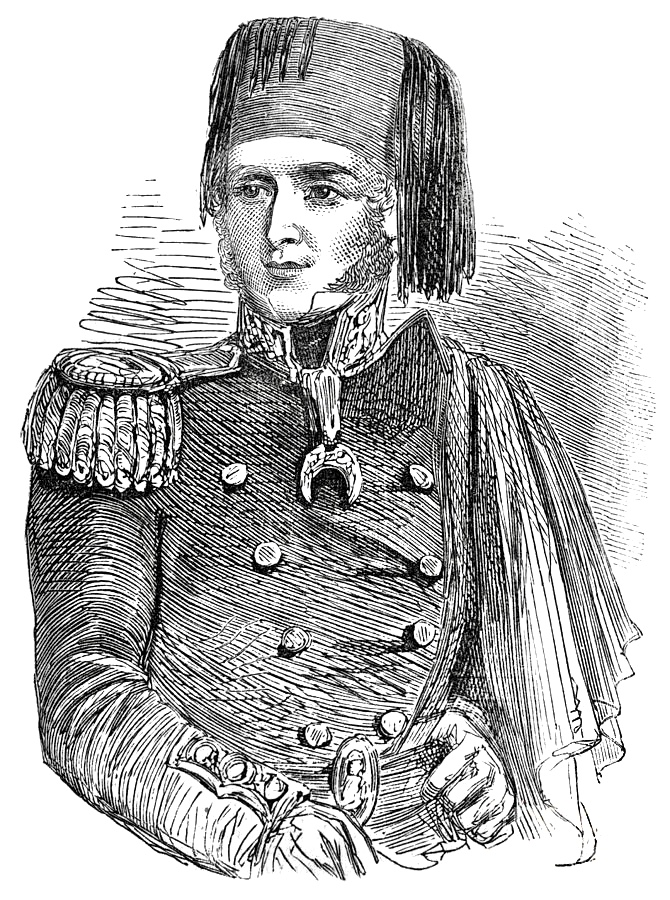
Adolphus Slade

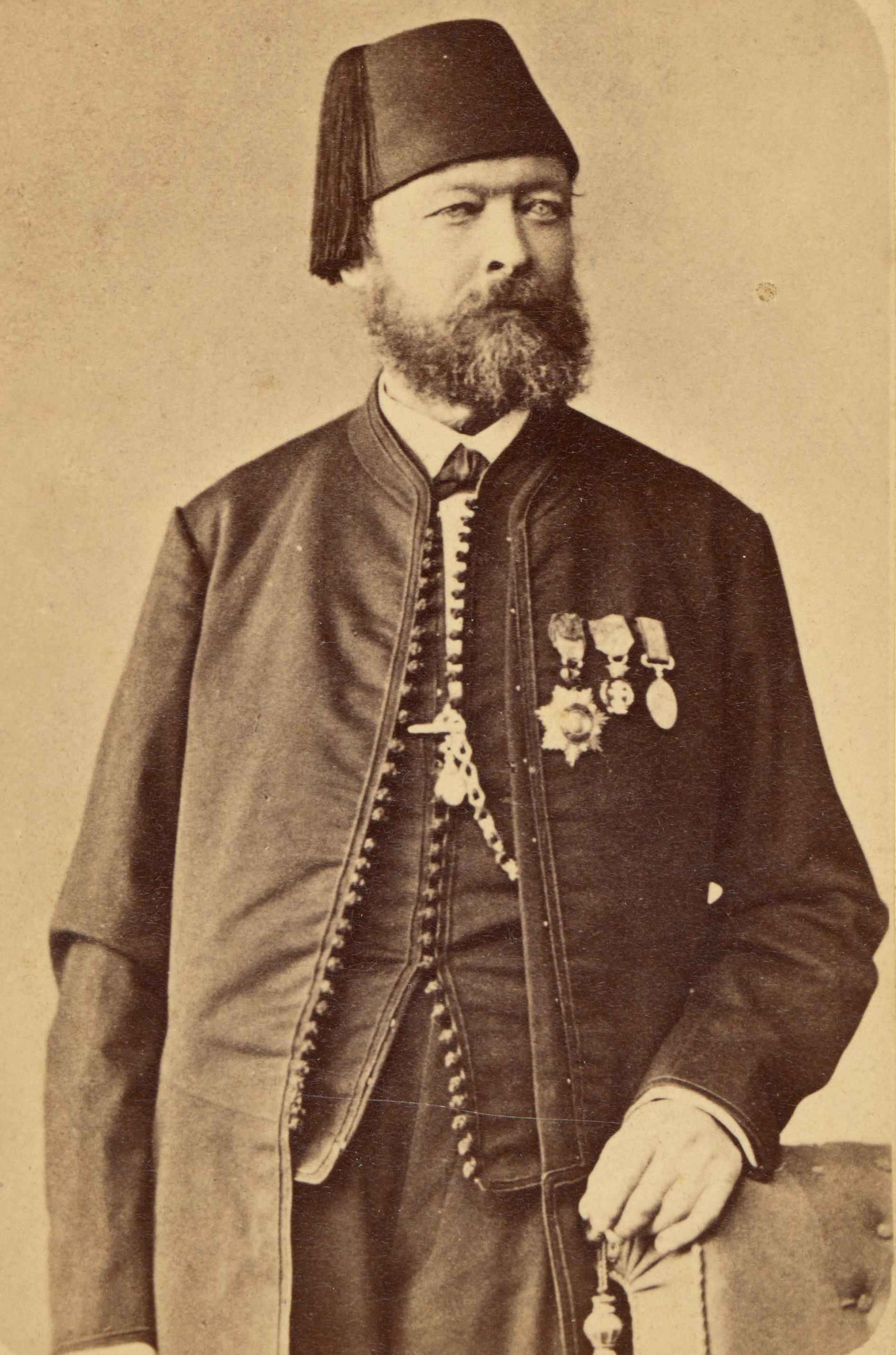
Józef Jagmin

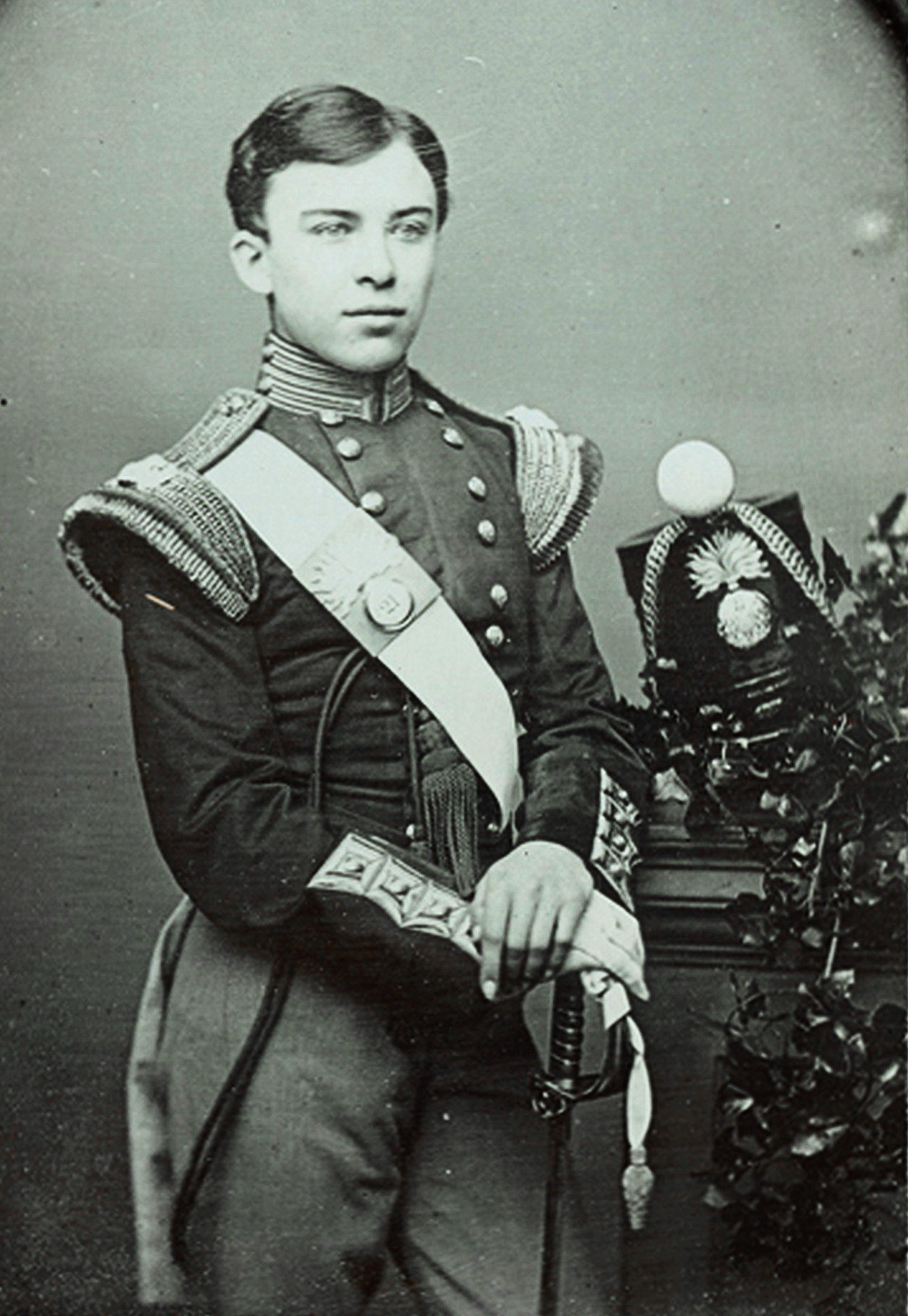
Stanislas Saint Clair

- Charles de Schwartzenberg, French-born Belgian aristocrat of German descent who fought in the Ottoman army irregularly between 1854 until his death in 1878
- Adam Mickiewicz, famed Polish poet who served in the Crimean War and died in Istanbul (possibly from cholera)
- Antoni Aleksander Iliński, Polish military officer and general who served in the Ottoman army from 1844 until his death in 1861
- Augustus Charles Hobart-Hampden, British admiral in the Ottoman Navy irregularly between 1867 and the 1880s. He played a big role in suppressing the Cretan Revolt, and went on to serve in the 1877–1878 Russo-Turkish war
- Adolphus Slade, British admiral in the Ottoman Navy from 1849 to 1866. He most notably served in the Crimean War
- Józef Jagmin, Polish noble who served as an Ottoman officer in the Crimean War and the 1877–1878 Russo-Turkish war as the founder of the Polish Legion in Turkey
- Stanislas Saint Clair, Scottish-Polish-Lithuanian officer who served in the Crimean and 1877–1878 Russo-Turkish Wars
- Omar Pasha, Serbian Field marshal who fled from Austria and served in the Ottoman army for nearly 30 years
- Mustafa Celalettin Pasha, Polish noble who served in the Ottoman army for nearly 25 years. Great-grandfather of Nâzım Hikmet
- Robert Cannon, Scottish pasha and lieutenant-general who served in the Ottomana army during the Crimean War. He is considered, alongside Omar Pasha, to have repelled the Russians from the Danubian front of the war
- György Kmety, Hungarian noble who served in the Crimean War and was known for refusing to abandon Kars in 1855 as general Fenwick Williams had advocated when the Russians started to attain significant gains
- Fenwick Williams, Canadian military leader who served in the Crimean War and participated in the 1855 defence of Kars
- Władysław Stanisław Zamoyski, Polish aristocrat who led a Polish cavalry division in the Ottoman Army during the Crimean War
- Gerandiqo Berzeg, Circassian commander who fought for the Ottomans in the Crimean and 1877–1878 Russo-Turkish Wars
- Helmuth von Moltke the Elder, Prussian military advisor to the Ottoman Empire in the 1830s. He made extensive reconnaissances and surveys, riding several thousand miles in the course of his journey, visiting and mapping many parts of the Ottoman Empire to fulfil his role effectively
- Adolf Farkas, Hungarian pasha who served in the Ottoman army for 50 years. He was the father of one of the first Turkish female poets, Nigâr Hanım
- Seferbiy Zaneqo, Circassian diplomat who was the Ottoman ambassador to Circassia from 1829 to 1860. He was also a commander who served in important Ottoman wars such as the 1828–1829 Russo-Turkish and Crimean Wars
- Thomas Keith, Scottish POW who converted to Islam and joined the Ottoman army. He died in 1815 as governor of Medina while fighting the rising power of the Saudi dynasty
- Richard Guyon, British soldier of French descent who fought in the Crimean War and had a pivotal role in organising the army of Kars in its 1855 defence
- Seweryn Bieliński, Polish noble who served in the Ottoman army from 1854 to 1895. He was the father of Alfred Bilinski
- Josef Kohlman, Czech general who served in the Ottoman army for over 30 years
- Józef Bem, Polish engineer and general who served as Governor of the Sanjak of Aleppo. He protected the city from sieges effectively
- Giovanni Timoteo Calosso, Italian soldier who served in the Ottoman army for 13 years
- Friedrich Wilhelm von Laue, Prussian major-general who served in the Ottoman army for over a decade
- George Koehler, British-German military engineer who aided in defending Jaffa from the French invasion in 1800
- Giuseppe Donizetti, Italian musician and Instructor General at the court of Sultan Mahmud II. It is believed that he composed the first official Ottoman anthem and introduced European music to the Ottoman military
- Callisto Guatelli, Italian musician who continued Donizetti Pasha's work at the Ottoman court. Served the Ottoman Empire for over 50 years
- Thaddeus P. Mott, American adventurer who saw plenty of service in the Balkans with the Ottoman army between 1867 and 1869. His father, Valentine Mott, had been personal physician to Sultan Abdulmejid I and one of his sisters was married to the Ottoman ambassador to the United States, Edouard Blak
- Edouard Blak, American of French-Scottish origins who served as the first Ottoman ambassador to the United States
- Edward A. Wild, American homeopathic doctor and Union soldier who served in the Crimean War as a medical doctor
- Shotaro Noda, Japanese journalist who taught the Japanese language in the Army War College to naval officers for 2 years. Also remembered as the first known Japanese convert to Islam
- Michał Czajkowski, Polish noble of Cossack heritage who formed a Cossack brigade in the Crimean War to fight on the side of the Ottomans
- Wilhelm Strecker, Prussian pasha and officer who served in the Ottoman army from 1854 to 1890
- Valentine Baker, British soldier who served in the Crimean and 1877–1878 Russo-Turkish Wars
- Teofil Lapinski, Polish major who fought in the Polish legion in the Ottoman army during the Crimean War
- Henry Adrian Churchill, British diplomat and archeological explorer who participated in the 1855 defence of Kars during the Crimean War
- Franz von Werner, Austrian noble who served the Ottoman state as a soldier and diplomat for nearly 30 years
- Augustus Buchel, German military instructor and possibly a pasha in the Ottoman army during the Crimean War
- James Patrick Mahon, Irish barrister who served in the Ottoman army
- Luigi Calligaris, Italian soldier who served in the 1831–1833 Egyptian–Ottoman War
- Pierre-Désiré Guillemet, French painter who brought European style paintings to the Ottoman Empire. Died while trying to help refugees and the sick from the 1877–1878 Russo-Turkish war
- Francesco Della Suda, Italian pharmacist who pioneered the career of pharmacy in the Ottoman Empire. He served in the front lines of the Crimean War as a medical doctor
- Samson Cerfberr, French-Jew who fought as a commander alongside Osman Gradaščević against the rebelling Serbs in the Ottoman Eyalet of Bosnia in 1813
- Friedrich Grach, Prussian officer who served in the Ottoman army from 1841 to 1854
- Conrad Burchard, Baltic German-Polish noble who served as a pasha in the Ottoman army
- Damat Gürcü Halil Rifat Pasha, Georgian admiral who would serve as Kapudan Pasha and married into the imperial Osmanoğlu family
- Rüstem Mariani, Italian aristocrat who served as Ottoman ambassador to multiple countries and also as governor of Mount Lebanon from 1873 to 1883
- György Klapka, Hungarian general who served in the Crimean and 1877–1878 Russo-Turkish Wars
- Seydi Ali Pasha, Georgian grand admiral of the Ottoman navy from 1807 to 1809 and governor of Silistra Eyalet in 1808
- Feliks Breański, Polish brigadier general and diplomat who served in the Crimean War
- Ludwik Bystrzonowski, Polish general who served in the Crimean War
- Otto Kähler, Prussian major-general who participated in reforming the Ottoman army in the early 1880s
- Charles Ryan, Australian surgeon who served as a doctor and an Ottoman military commander in the 1877–1878 Russo-Turkish war
- Julius Michael Millingen, Dutch-English who served as a court physician for five Sultans
- Fossati brothers, Swiss brothers who served as court architects from 1836 to 1858
- Mieczysław Jan Łuczyński, Polish major who served in the Ottoman army from 1878 to 1893
- August Giacomo Jochmus, Austrian field marshal who served in the Ottoman army from 1838 to 1848
- Karl von Vincke, Prussian baron who served in the Ottoman army from 1837 to 1840. He participated in reform efforts and the 1839–1841 Egyptian–Ottoman War
- Hugh Rose, British baron who served in the 1839–1841 Egyptian–Ottoman War as well as the Crimean War
- Baldwin Wake Walker, British admiral who served in the Ottoman navy for multiple years
- Charles George Baker, British officer who served in the Ottoman army during the 1877–1878 Russo-Turkish war
- Henryk Dembiński, Polish military engineer who served in the Ottoman army
- Friedrich von der Becke, Prussian noble who served in the Ottoman army for 5 years
- Karol Brzozowski, Polish engineer who conducted research for the Ottoman state for decades
- Władysław Kościelski, Polish-Prussian noble who served in the Ottoman army for a few decades
- Alexandre Blacque, French-Scottish bourgeoisie who founded multiple news organisations in the Ottoman Empire which was used as propaganda for the sultan against Russian aggression. He was the father of Edouard Blak
- Władysław Jabłonowski, Polish doctor who regularly participated in Ottoman military campaigns from the 1860s to 1880s
- Stanisław Chlebowski, Polish who served as a court painter from 1864 to 1876
- János Bangya, Hungarian noble who served in the Ottoman army for 14 years
- Maximilian Eugen von Stein, Austrian baron who served as a general in the Ottoman army for several years
- Antal Schneider, Hungarian-German noble who served as a military doctor in the Ottoman army for several years
- János Balogh, Hungarian politician who fought in the Crimean War
- Ferenc Szőllősy, Székely politician who served in the Ottoman army for 6 years
- Stanisław Julian Ostroróg, Polish noble from the Ostroróg family who served in the Crimean War
- Henry Langhorne Thompson, British officer who noted for his courageousness in the defence of Kars during the Crimean War
- Berzenczey László, Hungarian noble who fought in the Crimean War
- Mór Kaufmann, Hungarian-German who served in the Ottoman army for several years
- Klemens Przewłocki, Polish noble who fought in the Crimean War. Brother of Walerian Przewłocki
- Walerian Przewłocki, Polish noble who fought in the Crimean War
- Józefa Rostkowska, Polish woman who served as a nurse for 2 years during the Crimean War
- Aleksander Waligórski, Polish general who served in the Crimean War
- Roman Czarnomski, Polish noble who fought in the Crimean War
- Antoni Jeziorański, Polish-Jewish general who served in the Crimean War
- Zygmunt Jordan, Polish noble who fought in the Caucasian front of the Crimean War
- Ignacy Żegota Grzybiński, Polish soldier who fought in the Crimean War
- Aleksander Matuszewicz, Polish noble who served in the Crimean War
- Michał Mrozowicki, Polish noble who served in the Crimean War
- August Okołowicz, Franco-Polish general who served in the Crimean War
- Tomasz Wierzbicki, Polish noble who served in the Crimean War and again a few years later
- Feliks Buski, Polish soldier who fought in the Crimean War
- Jan Drzewiecki, Polish commander who fought in the Crimean War
- Janusz Woronicz, Polish noble who served in the Crimean War
- Léon Parvillée, French architect who worked on many architectural projects in Istanbul and Bursa from 1853 to 1866
- Wojciech Chrzanowski, Polish general who assisted in Ottoman military reforms in the early 1840s
- Samuel Baker, British pasha and major-general of the Ottoman army
- Franciszek Ołaj, Polish official who fought in the Crimean War
- Teofil Osiecki, Polish officer who served in the Crimean War
- Władysław Miśkiewicz, Polish captain who served in the Crimean War
- De Renzie Brett, Irish soldier who served in the Crimean War
- Alessandro De Bianchi, Italian soldier who from 1855 to 1859 worked with Ottoman officials in some eastern regions of the country to gather information on the ethnicities of the people living there
- Celso Caesar Moreno, Italian politician who served in the Crimean War
- Christopher Teesdale, British lieutenant who participated in the Siege of Kars
- Carl Eduard Hammerschmidt, Austrian scientist who served in the Crimean War and was one of the founders of the Turkish Red Crescent
- Lajos Tüköry, Hungarian major who served in the Crimean War
- John Michel, British officer who served in the Crimean War
- Collingwood Dickson, British soldier who served in the Crimean War. Son of Alexander Dickson
- Robert Vivian, British officer who served in the Crimean War
- Henry Atwell Lake, British military engineer who served in the Crimean War
- Jacques Balthazar Brun de Sainte-Catherine, French noble who served as a shipbuilding engineer and built over 20 warships for the Ottoman navy
- Vincent-Yves Boutin, French military engineer who helped defend Istanbul from British attacks in 1807 during the Anglo-Turkish War
- Henri-Guillaume Schlesinger, Franco-German painter who occasionally worked in the Ottoman court by painting aspects of the Ottoman Empire
- Marius Michel Pasha, French noble who built a network of lighthouses along the coasts of the Ottoman Empire

=== 20th century ===
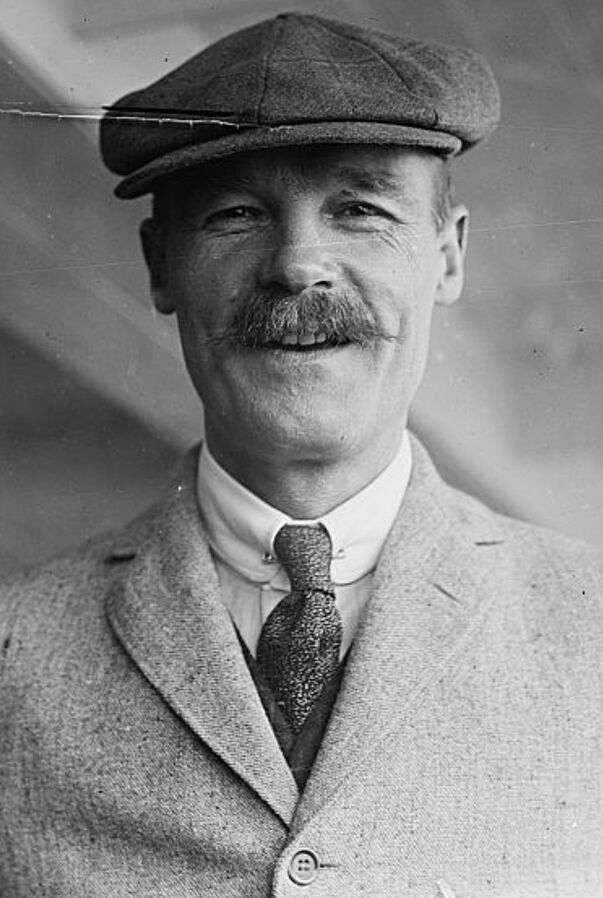
Alfred Bilinski

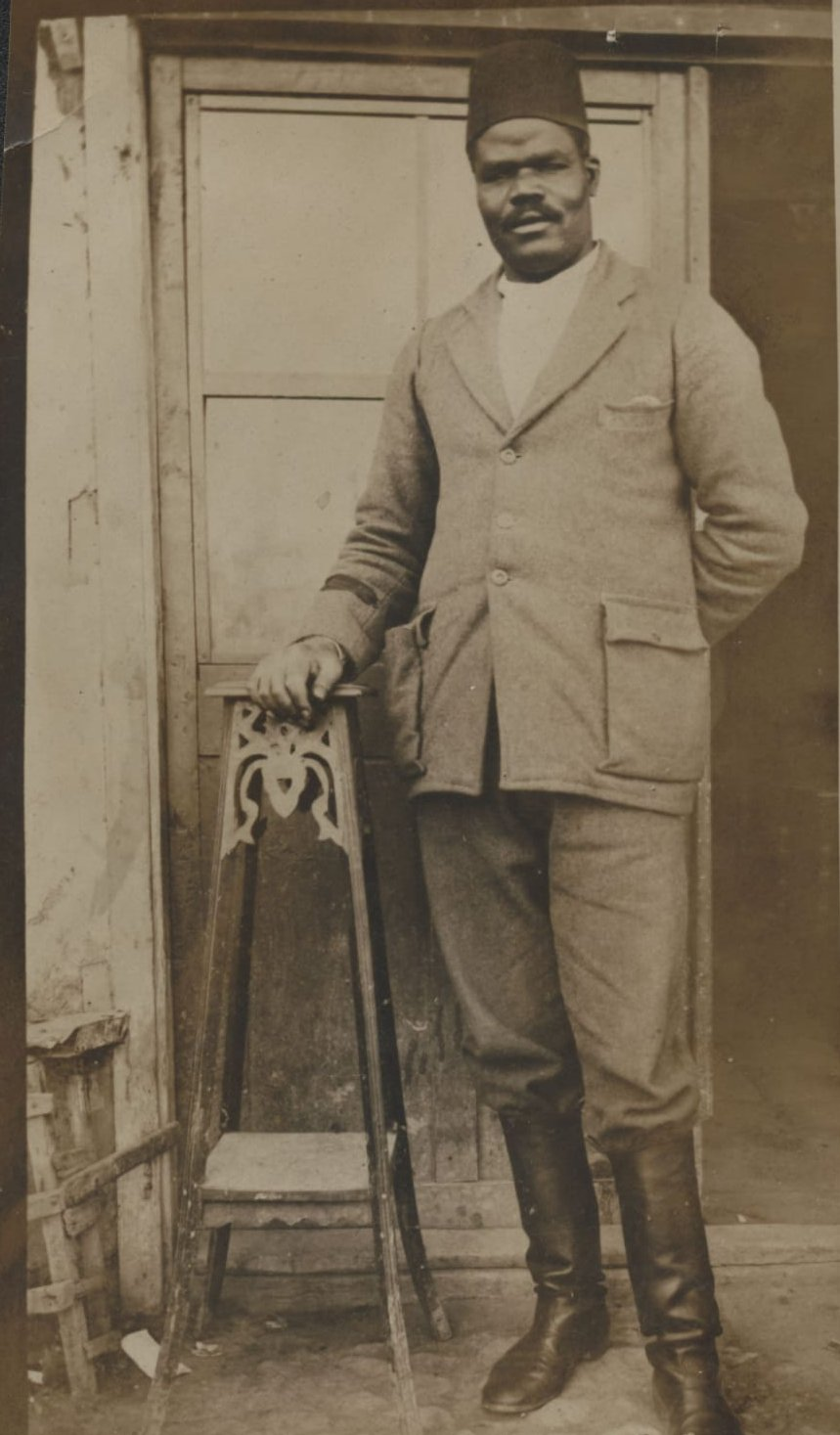
Black Musa

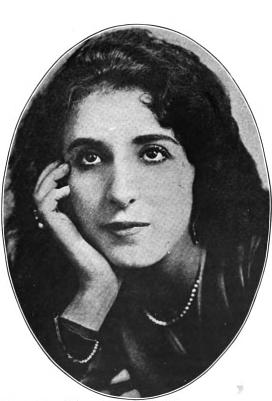
Despina Storch

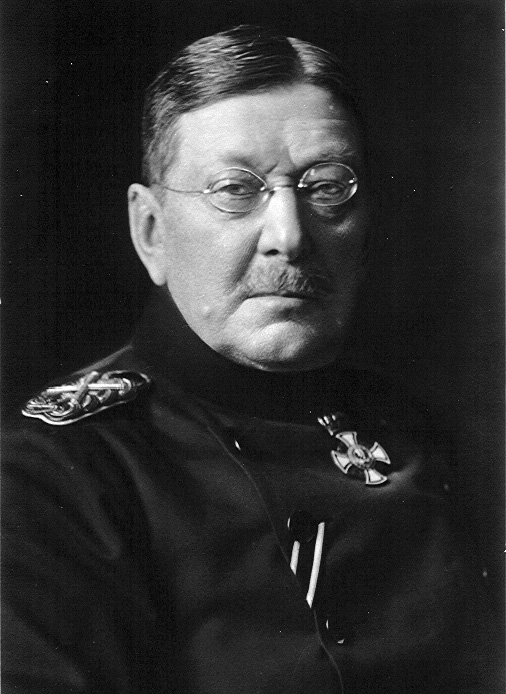
Colmar Freiherr von der Goltz

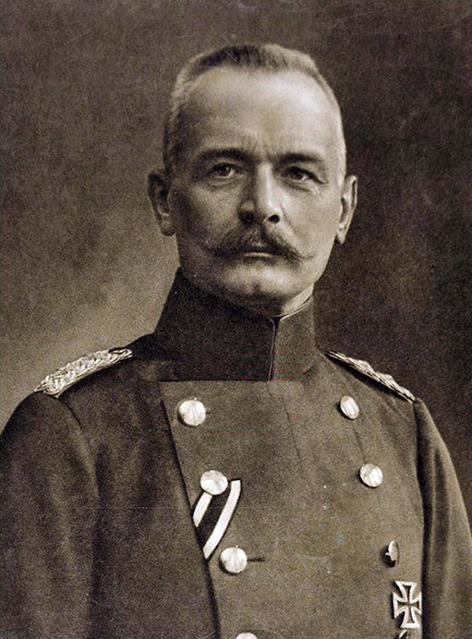
Erich von Falkenhayn

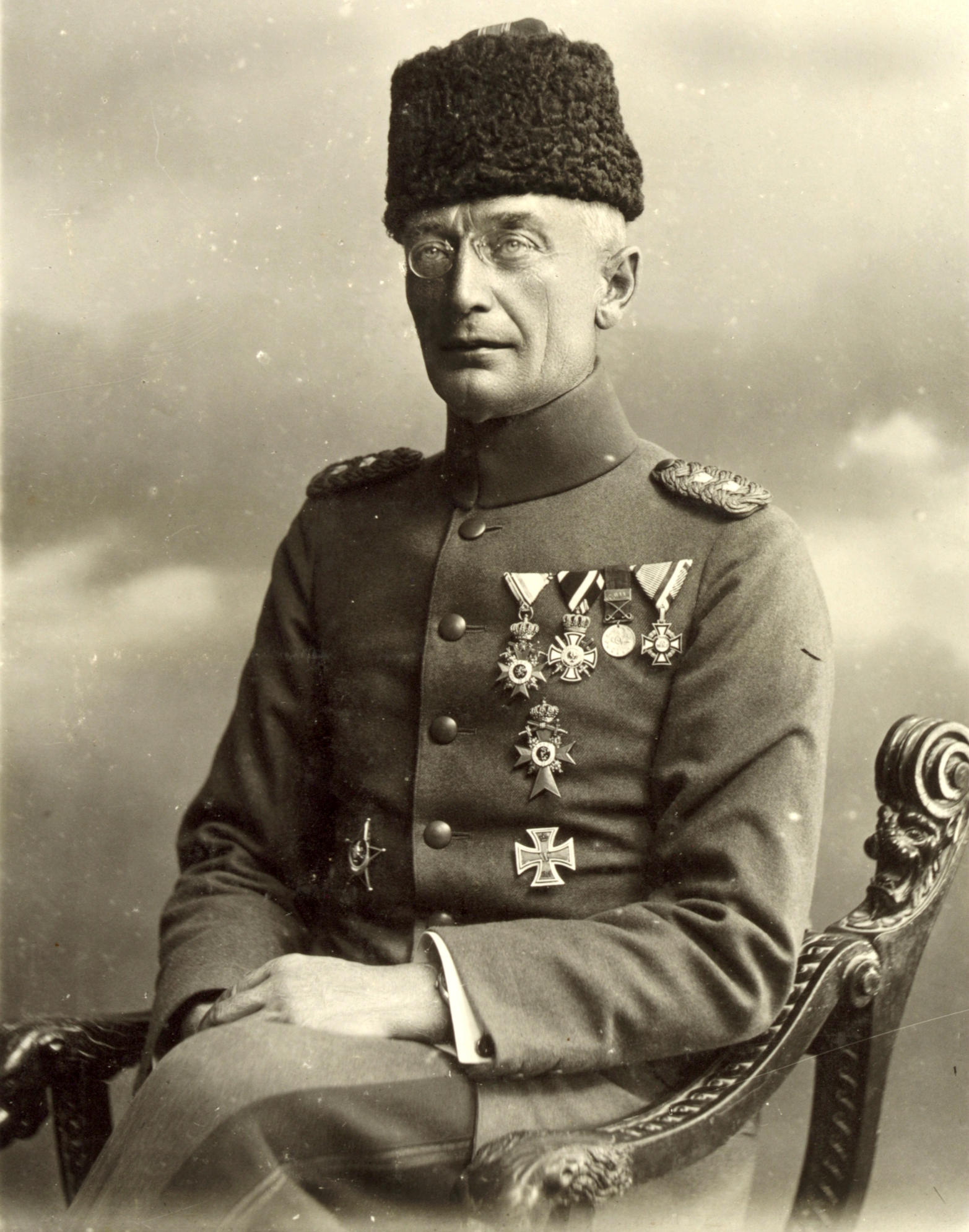
Friedrich Freiherr Kress von Kressenstein

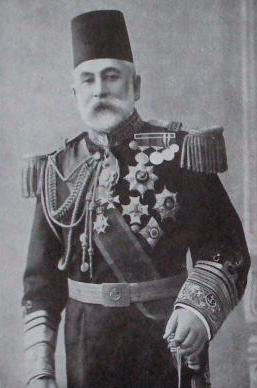
Henry Felix Woods

- Alfred Bilinski, Polish–British aristocrat who would serve in the 1897 Greco-Turkish and 1912 Balkan wars. He would later become the Ottoman ambassador to the United States in 1914
- Black Musa, Sudanese member of the Special Organization who participated in every war involving the Ottoman Empire from the Italo-Turkish War to World War I. Musa was seen as one of the faces of anti-colonialism in the Ottoman Empire, and was renowned for his loyalty to the state
- Despina Storch, Phanariote woman of German-Bulgarian descent who spied for the Ottoman Empire during World War I. Storch was immortalized as "Turkish Delight", "Turkish beauty", and a "modern Cleopatra" in spy literature
- Colmar Freiherr von der Goltz, Prussian general who contributed to the transformation and modernisation of the Ottoman army and was seen as a 'father figure' by Ottoman soldiers. He would die serving in the Ottoman army in World War I, and was buried in Istanbul in accordance with his will
- Friedrich Freiherr Kress von Kressenstein, German general who participated and led many battles on the side of the Ottomans in the First World War
- Henry Felix Woods, British admiral who served in the Ottoman navy for decades. He was aide-de-camp to Sultan Abdul Hamid II for a few years
- Rafael de Nogales, Venezuelan soldier and adventurer who served in the Ottoman army for the entirety of the Great War
- Ransford Dodsworth Bucknam, Canadian admiral in the Ottoman navy from 1905 to 1911
- Thadée Gasztowtt, Polish journalist of noble Lithuanian descent who served as an Ottoman diplomat for years and fought in the Italo-Turkish War
- James Maurice Frost, Scottish inventor who served in the Imperial Arsenal for 45 years
- Harun el-Raschid Bey, German heavy bomber pilot who converted to Islam while in the service of the Ottomans in World War I
- Erich von Falkenhayn, German officer who was supreme commander of two Ottoman armies in Palestine. He held the rank of Mushir (equivalent to field marshal) in the Ottoman army during World War I
- Fritz Bronsart von Schellendorf, German officer and politician who was the chief of staff of the Ottoman Army and was one of the many German military advisors assigned to the Ottoman Empire. He was instrumental in drafting initial war (WW1) plans for the Ottoman Army
- Otto Liman von Sanders, German-Jewish general who served as a military advisor to the Ottoman Army during the First World War, and commanded an Ottoman army during the Sinai and Palestine Campaign in 1918
- Ludwig Karl Friedrich Detroit, Prussian of Huguenot descent who served in the Ottoman army for 35 years
- Stephen Bartlett Lakeman, British administrator who would serve in the Ottoman army for the entirety of the Crimean War
- Wilhelm Souchon, German admiral who led a fleet which participated in the Black Sea Raid bringing the Ottoman Empire into World War I
- Guido von Usedom, Prussian noble who served as an admiral in the Ottoman navy for the entirety of World War I
- Ludomił Rayski, Polish noble who served as a fighter pilot on multiple fronts for the Ottomans in World War I. He is considered the father of the Polish Air Force
- Oswald Boelcke, German flying ace who served in the Gallipoli campaign. He is honored as the father of the German fighter air force, and of air combat as a whole
- Hans-Joachim Buddecke, German flying ace who served in the Gallipoli campaign and other battles
- Hans von Seeckt, German officer who replaced Schellendorf as Chief of Staff of the Ottoman Army. Contributed to the modernisation of the Ottoman army considerably, and participated in numerous battles of the First World War
- Wiktor Unander, Swedish officer who fought in the First Balkan War
- Władysław Czajkowski, Polish noble who served as a statesman and general in the Ottoman army
- Erich Prigge, German soldier who served in the Ottoman Empire during the entirety of the First World War. He was adjutant to Otto Liman von Sanders
- Erich Weber, German officer who served in the Ottoman army during the First World War and participated in the Gallipoli Campaign
- Rudolf von Sebottendorf, German intelligence agent who fought in the First Balkan War
- Lintorn Simmons, British officer who participated in most of the sieges and battles of the Crimean War
- Moshe Sharett, Jewish politician (the 2nd prime minister of Israel) who served in the Ottoman army as a first lieutenant in World War I
- Abdur Rahman Peshawari, wealthy Kashmiri–Pashtun individual who served in the Ottoman army from the Balkan Wars to the Turkish War of Independence
- Washington Carroll Tevis, American mercenary who commanded Ottoman forces in the Crimean War and was present at the defence of Kars
- Otto von Feldmann, German commander who alongside Schellendorf was with Enver Pasha daily during the First World War
- Louis von Kamphövener, German marshal who served as a military advisor to Sultan Abdul Hamid II for several years
- Waldemar Pieper, German admiral who served as a pasha in the Ottoman army and was instrumental in the expansion of ammunition factories in the empire
- Otto von Lossow, German officer who assisted the Ottoman Army and the many German military advisors in planning the ongoing response to Allied landings at Gallipoli
- Raimondo D'Aronco, Italian chief palace architect to Sultan Abdul Hamid II. Designed many important buildings of Istanbul such as Yıldız Palace
- Viktor von Grumbkow, Prussian noble who served in the Ottoman army from 1889 to 1901
- Ödön Széchenyi, Hungarian noble who was pivotal in the creation of a formal fire brigade in the Ottoman Empire. He is the son of István Széchenyi, a Hungarian count, politician, political theorist, writer, and statesman who is referred to in Hungary as 'the Greatest Hungarian'
- Gyula Germanus, German–Jewish Islamologist who served in the Ottoman army during the Gallipoli campaign
- Frederick van Millingen, Dutch-English officer who served in the Ottoman army from 1853 to 1864
- Alexander Vallaury, French architect who founded architectural education and lectured in the School of Fine Arts in Istanbul
- Raymond Charles Péré, French architect who worked in İzmir for 49 years and is best known for designing the İzmir Clock Tower and St. Helena Church
- Paul Lange, German musician who much like Donizetti was one of the pioneers to bring European classical music to Istanbul (between 1880 and 1920)
- Arnold Burrowes Kemball, British officer who accompanied Abdülkerim Nadir Pasha during the 1876–77 Serbian–Ottoman War
- Heinrich August Meissner, German engineer who served in the Ottoman army in World War I. He was largely responsible for the railway network in the Ottoman Empire and later helped manage the network in Turkey
- Felix Guse, German lieutenant colonel who commanded regiments in the Caucasian front of World War I
- Bodo Borries von Ditfurth, German noble who served as military advisor to Sultan Abdul Hamid II for 7 years
- William Willmer, German lieutenant colonel who had a significant impact on the Ottoman victory at Gallipoli
- Herbert Fischer, German captain who served in the Ottoman army for the entirety of World War I
- Franz Carl Endres, German officer who served in the First Balkan War and World War I
- Hans Feldbausch, German admiral who served in the Ottoman navy for several years
- Karl August von Laffert, German noble who served as military advisor to the Ottoman army for 2 years
- Sylvester Boettrich, German officer who served as the head of the Turkish railroad system during World War I
- Albert Heuck, German lieutenant general who served in the Ottoman army for several years
- Johannes Hochbaum, German major who served in the Ottoman army for nearly 2 years
- Hans Guhr, German commander who served in the Ottoman army for several years
- Erich Serno, German pilot who was appointed to reorganise the Turkish Air Force
- Georg Mayer, German military doctor who served as the senior physician of the staff of the Ottoman armed forces
- Carl Mühlmann, German officer who served in multiple battles of the First World War in the Ottoman army
- Wilhelm Buße, German admiral who served as the head of the Ottoman navy in the Tigris–Euphrates river system
- Werner von Frankenberg und Proschlitz, Prussian noble who served as a major general on the Palestinian front
- William Sydney Churchill, British translator and gendarmerie officer who served across the Ottoman Empire
- Paul Wittek, Austrian historian who served as a military advisor to the Ottoman state during the First World War
- Grigore Sturdza, Russian-born Romanian soldier and politician who joined the Ottoman army as a colonel and took part in the Crimean War
- Alexander von Falkenhausen, German commander who served in the Sinai and Palestine campaign
- Gerd von Rundstedt, German noble who was involved in the reorganization of the General Staff of the Ottoman Empire
- Arthur Bopp, German commander in the Ottoman army for nearly a decade
- Hans Kannengiesser, German commander in the Ottoman army during World War I
- Johannes Merten, German admiral who participated in the Gallipoli campaign
- Johann von Kiesling auf Kieslingstein, German noble who served as a lieutenant colonel on the Palestinian front
- Erich von Leipzig, Prussian colonel who served as a military advisor to the Ottoman military for several years
- Otto-Felix Mannesmann, German spy who worked as an agent for the Ottoman Empire in Libya during World War I. His task was to encourage the Senusiyya under Ahmed Sharif as-Senussi to fight the British and to support the clan through arms deliveries
- Hans-Joachim von Mellenthin, German admiral who served in the Ottoman navy for a few months and aided in the bombardment of Russian ports
- Theodor Kübel, German officer who was tasked with examining the Turkish railway network for nearly 2 years
- Lucas Kirsten, German lieutenant colonel who fought with Turkish cavalry units on the Caucasus front and at Gallipoli
- August Klingenheben, German lieutenant who served in the Ottoman army for a year
- Walther Iven, German officer who served in the Ottoman army during the Mesopotamian campaign
- Leon Walerian Ostroróg, Polish noble from the Ostroróg family who served as an advisor in the Ottoman Public Administration of debt in Istanbul for over a decade
- Léon Guilain Bureau, Belgian soldier who helped reorganize the Ottoman police and gendarmerie from 1898 to 1909
- Marian Langiewicz, Polish leader of the January Uprising who fled to the Ottoman Empire and served the Sublime Porte in the last decade of his life
- Gustav von Oppen, German noble who commanded troops in multiple battles of the First World War whilst in the Ottoman army
- August Stange, Prussian artillery officer who served in the Ottoman army against Russian forces in the Caucasus
- Károly Eberhardt, Hungarian general who served in the Crimean War
- Rolf Carls, German admiral who served in the Ottomany navy from 1914 to 1917
- Hubert von Rebeur-Paschwitz, German admiral who served in the Ottomany navy from 1917 to 1918
- Rudolf Höss, German officer who served in the Mesopotamian campaign of the First World War
- William A. Chanler, American explorer who encouraged people to rebel against the Italian invasion of Libya during the Italo-Turkish War
- Yukichi Tsumura, Japanese admiral who refused to hand 1012 Turkish prisoners of war to Greece for 6 months despite extreme pressure
- August Nicolai, German general who served in the Ottoman army for 5 years
- Max von Oppenheim, German-Jewish diplomat who disseminated propaganda material in favour of the Ottomans during World War I
- Curt Prüfer, German diplomat who worked with Max von Oppenheim in his espionage and propaganda activities
- Etienne Perrinet von Thauvenay, German noble who served as a lieutenant colonel in the Ottoman army for 2 years
- Otto von Schrader, German admiral who served in the Ottoman navy for 2 years
- Douglas Gamble, British admiral who served as the head of the British naval missions to the Ottoman Empire from 1909 to 1910
- Hugh Pigot Williams, British admiral who served as the head of the British naval missions to the Ottoman Empire from 1910 to 1912
- Arthur Limpus, British admiral who served as the head of the British naval missions to the Ottoman Empire from 1912 to 1914
- Sami Günzberg, Hungarian or Russian–Jew who served as the personal dentists of Turkish leaders Sultan Abdul Hamid II to Adnan Menderes. This is a period of over 60 years
- Gerold von Gleich, German officer who served in the Ottoman army in 1916
- Heinrich Eberbach, German officer who served in the Ottoman army on the Palestinian front
- Fritz Grobba, German diplomat who fought in Ottoman Palestine during World War I
- Moris Fabbri, Italian-Azerbaijani who served in the Ottoman during the First World War
- Johannes Block, German officer who served in the Mesopotamian campaign
- Erich Hippke, German military doctor in the Ottoman army during the First World War
- Hans-Ulrich Back, German soldier who served in the Ottoman army for a few months during the First World War
- August Jasmund, Prussian architect who served the empire for decades
- Vitaliano Poselli, Italian architect who served the empire for decades
- Pietro Arrigoni, Italian architect who served the empire for decades
- Guglielmo Semprini, Italian architect who served the empire for decades
- Annibale Rigotti, Italian architect who served the empire for nearly 5 years
- Fausto Zonaro, Italian painter who served as court painter for 13 years
- David Hacohen, Jewish Knesset member who served in the Ottoman army during World War I
- Godfrey Douglas Giles, British painter who commanded a Turkish cavalry division during the Mahdist War
- Kaspar von Preysing-Lichtenegg-Moos, German-Italian noble who served for a few months as an officer in the First Balkan War
- Julius Wieting, German military doctor who served as a pasha and a medical advisor from the First Balkan War to World War I
- Georg Deycke, German doctor who served as the chief physician of Gülhane Training and Research Hospital for nearly a decade
- Robert Rieder, German doctor who reformed medical training and military medicine in the Ottoman Empire. He also introduced the nursing and medical assistant roles to the country
