= List of fleet commanders of the Ottoman Navy =

List of Ottoman admirals

This list includes fleet commanders (Turkish: Donanma Komutanı) of the Ottoman Navy.

On March 13, 1867, the title of Kapudan Pasha (list) was abolished, and the naval minister (Bahriye Nazırı) and the fleet commander (Donanma Komutanı) were instituted.

No.	Portrait	Name	Took office	Left office	Time in office
Ottoman Navy Fleet Commanders (1877–1920)
1	Bozcaadalı Hasan Hüsnü Pasha	Admiral; Bozcaadalı Hasan Hüsnü Pasha (1832–1903)	1877	1894	16–17 years
2	Hüseyin Pasha	Admiral; Hüseyin Pasha	1894	1897	2–3 years
3	Hasan Rami Pasha	Admiral; Hasan Rami Pasha (1842–1923)	1897	1908	10–11 years
4	Sir Douglas Gamble	Ferik Admiral; Sir Douglas Gamble (1856–1934)	1908	8 February 1910	1–2 years
5	Ford	Ford; Head of the first British naval mission to the Ottoman Empire	February 1910	April 1910	2 months
6	Hugh Pigot Williams	Liva Amiral; Hugh Pigot Williams (1858–1934); Head of the second British naval mission to the Ottoman Empire	April 1910	December 1910	8 months
7	Cibalili Tahir Mehmed Bey	Kalyon Kaptanı; Cibalili Tahir Mehmed Bey	20 December 1910	24 July 1912	1 year, 217 days
8	Sermet Fazıl Bey	Kalyon Kaptanı; Sermet Fazıl Bey	24 July 1912	18 August 1912	25 days
9	Selanikli Ramiz Numan Bey	Kalyon Kaptanı; Selanikli Ramiz Numan Bey	19 November 1912	6 February 1913	171 days
(7)	Cibalili Tahir Mehmed Bey	Kalyon Kaptanı; Cibalili Tahir Mehmed Bey	6 February 1913	14 November 1913	281 days
10	Arthur Limpus	Liva Amiral; Arthur Limpus (1863–1931); Head of the third British naval mission to the Ottoman Empire.	14 November 1913	3 August 1914	262 days
11	Arif Ahmed Bey	Fırkateyn Kaptanı; Arif Ahmed Bey	3 August 1914	3 September 1914	31 days
12	Wilhelm Souchon	Admiral; Wilhelm Souchon (1864–1946); Head of the German naval mission to the Ottoman Empire.	3 September 1914	24 August 1917	2 years, 355 days
13	Hubert von Rebeur-Paschwitz	Admiral; Hubert von Rebeur-Paschwitz (1863–1933)	24 August 1917	3 November 1918	1 year, 71 days
(11)	Arif Ahmed Bey	Liva Amiral; Arif Ahmed Bey	3 November 1918	22 April 1920	1 year, 171 days
Turkish Navy Fleet Commanders (1922–1924)
14	Hamdi Tevfik Bey	Liva Amiral; Hamdi Tevfik Bey	22 December 1922	23 January 1924	1 year, 32 days
15	Fuat Hüsnü Kayacan	Fırkateyn Kaptanı; Fuat Hüsnü Kayacan (1879–1963)	23 January 1924	11 May 1924	109 days
