= Battle of Caracal =

Russian Empire and Ottoman Empire battle

- Part of Crimean War
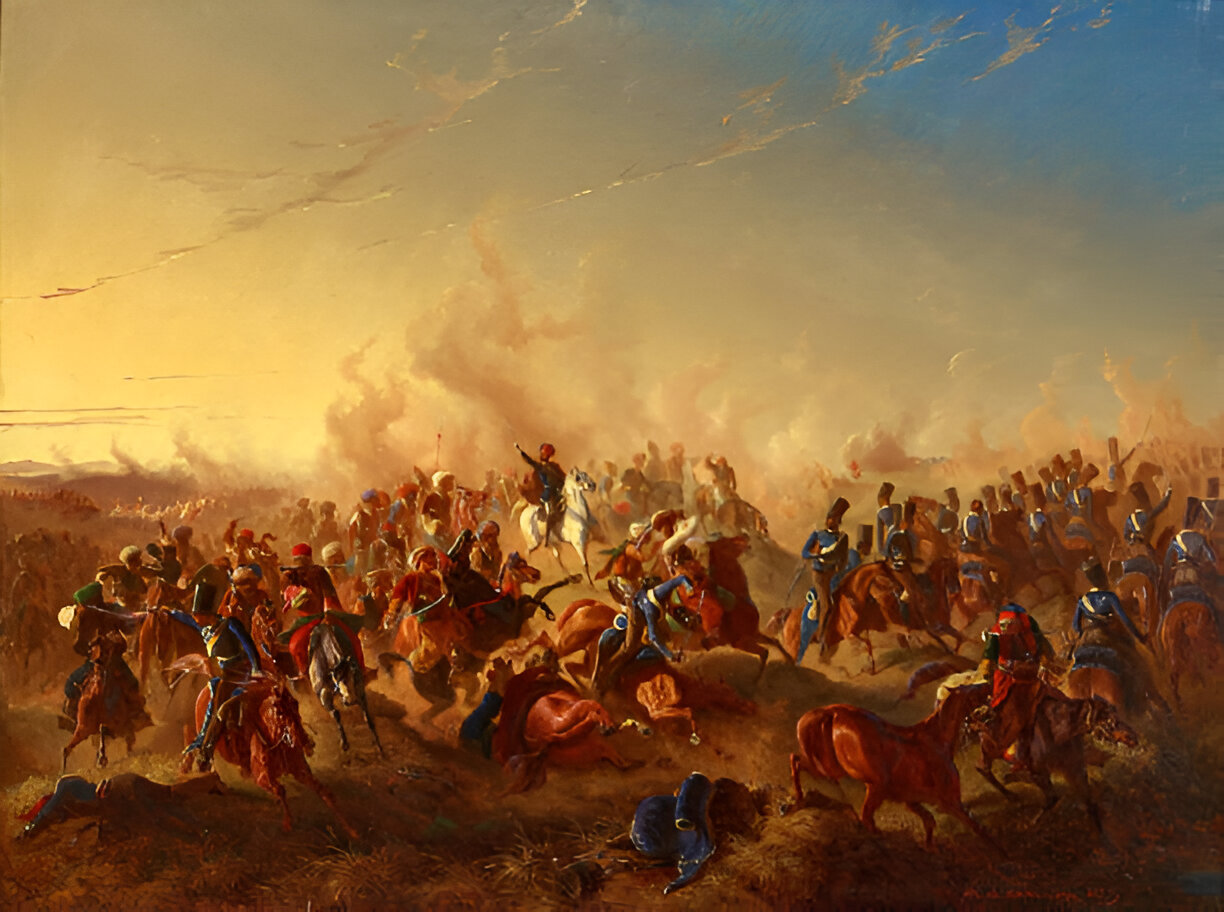
- Battle of Karakul by B. Bachmann-Hohmann, 1854
Date	around 1854
Location	Caracal, Wallachia (now Romania)
Result	Ottoman victory

Belligerents
Ottoman Empire	Russian Empire

Commanders and leaders
(Ottoman Empire) Antoni Aleksander Iliński	(Russian Empire) Andrey Karamzin (Russian Empire) Prens Golitsin † von Hahn † (Russian Empire) Lt. Brazhnevsk † (Russian Empire) Lt. Vink † (Russian Empire) Mikhail Chernyayev (Russian Empire) Andrei Krasovsky

Strength
3,000 field soldiers	Total: 700 soldiers 4 cannons

Casualties and losses
Unknown	Total: 139 soldiers killed all 4 cannons destroyed British sources: 3,000 killed 6 cannons destroyed

Battle of Caracal was an engagement battle between the Russian Empire and the Ottoman Empire in Wallachia, Caracal in 1854. Previous events that happened earlier, by January 1854, despite the set back at Cetatea–the Russian forces would continue to laid siege at Calafat. With that, the siege would continuously keep forwarding at May 1854, as the Russians would evidently keep being involved in the siege.

However, with Russian strategically aiming to laid siege at Calafat at May 1854, the Ottomans would be involved and fought with the Russians foes, and later on the Ottomans would eventually succeed the battle and beating the Russians in Wallachia at Caracal simultaneously at the same year.

== Description ==
Following the Ottomans final ultimatum on September 1853, forces of the Ottoman Empire were executed under an Ottoman general Omar Pasha and command to crossing the Danube in Vidin, and additionally capturing Calafat by August 1853. At the same time, in the east, the Ottomans were crossing the Danube at Silistra and eventually attacking the city of Olteni, and then to inflict the Russians at the town also. The results of the Battle of Oltenița caused the first engagement of the war following the declaration of the war as well.

The Russians were doing the counter-attack, but later on, they were eventually been beaten back. On 31 December 1853, the Ottoman forces at Calafat were moving to meet the Russians foes at Cetate, which is a small village that was located in Wallachia (now Romania), and it is nine miles away at north of Calafat, and it was also being likely engaged on January 6, 1854. By meaning engaged at Calafat, the Russians were trying to recapture Calafat. Most heavy fight however took place around at Cetate, and as the Russians, they were being driven back out of the village. Despite the set back at Cetate, on January 28, 1854, the Russians forces had them to laid the siege to Calafat. The siege would continue and lifted by the Russians until May 1854. The Ottomans later came to beat the Russians in the battle of Caracal.

Earlier events before this battle, on October 4, 1853, the Turks had declared war on Russia, and in the same month, they opened an offensive against at Russian in the Danubian principalities. After the fleets of the Russians Black Sea were destroyed, on the Turkish side of Black Sea, the allies France and Britain came on January 3, 1854, to protect the Turkish transports. Officially, Britain and France had declared war on Russia.
