= David Passi =

17th-century Jewish spy for the Ottoman Empire, Spain, Venice, and England

David Passi Kaptan-ı Derya Pasha

Kapudan Pasha (Admiral)
- In office 1595/6 – 1599
- Preceded by: Cığalazade Yusuf Sinan Pasha
- Succeeded by: Cığalazade Yusuf Sinan Pasha

Personal details
- Born: fl. 1560s Portugal or Spain
- Died: fl. 1599; Istanbul, Ottoman Empire ?
- Relatives: Moses Hamon ? Joseph de Segura ?
- Occupation: Spy, businessman

David Passi (fl. 1560s – fl. 1599), also known as Halil Pasha (Ottoman Turkish: خليل پاشا; Modern Turkish: Halil Paşa), was a Marrano who was Sultan Murad III's favourite, spy, adviser, and confidant. Despite this, Passi was not loyal to any one monarch since he worked as an agent for the Ottoman Empire, England, Venice, and Spain, all at the same time. He later chose to only serve the Ottomans. It was because of the ease of how Jews travelled throughout the Ottoman Empire was Passi and many other Jewish double agents able to remain uncaught for a long time, sometimes never.

== Early life ==
=== Background and career ===
Passi was either born in Spain or Portugal (most likely the latter). From the earliest known reference of Passi in records, it is known that he lived in Dubrovnik in the Republic of Ragusa (at the time under Ottoman suzerainty) before moving to Venice in 1572, working as a double agent for Spain and Venice. Spanish ambassador to Venice, Diego Guzmán de Silva, in an encoded letter to King Philip II, requested that Passi be given a Spanish passport for his service as a spy, describing him as an 'intelligent' person. According to de Silva, Passi spoke Spanish well and considered himself to be a Spaniard. He dressed 'in a Greek manner' and was extremely rich as he was a very successful businessman.

=== Personal life ===
Passi's wife lived in Ferrara. His uncle (either Moses Hamon, or his successor, Joseph de Segura) was a physician in the Ottoman court in Istanbul. Passi's father lived in Salonica, and his brother held a position in the Polish–Lithuanian court.

== Life in the Ottoman Empire ==
=== Arrival and first years ===
It is not known when exactly Passi moved to Istanbul, but it was sometime before 1585. During these times, he was informing Sultan Murad III of any noteworthy developments and intelligence he could gather in Europe, and was working with Elizabeth I on the issue of the War of Polish Succession. He would progress in rank in the following years, attaining important titles such as Pasha and Kaymakam.

=== Advisor to the Sultan ===
Grand Vizier Koca Sinan Pasha did not trust Passi, especially because of his close ties to Spain and his involvement in the Polish succession question. This is evident when in 1590 he asked Murad III to exclude Passi from talks on the invasion of Spain as he believed him to be a spy. The Sultan refused and ordered the Grand Vizier to listen to and favour Passi's statements, an instrumental move highlighting the importance of Passi to Murad III. Sinan Pasha obeyed these orders, but conflicted with Passi on where the Ottoman fleet should attack; Sinan Pasha wanted to invade Spain to avenge the Battle of Lepanto, whereas Passi advocated to invade Crete. High-ranking officials such as Chief of Janissaries Mehmed Ağa, Occhiali, and Cığalazade Yusuf Sinan Pasha, (the latter two who were both Italians in the service of the Sublime Porte), supported Passi against the Grand Vizier as they were either pro-Spain or anti-Venice.

=== Representative of Portuguese pretender, Antonio ===
When Alvaro Mendes' relations soured with Portuguese pretender to the throne, Antonio, Passi quickly took advantage of this and replaced his rival Mendes as Antonio's representative in Ottoman courts. This case was seen as controversial by English officials, with English ambassador to the Ottoman Empire, Edward Barton, advising Antonio to sue Alvaro Mendes in front of the Sultan and contend that Mendes' riches was unlawfully acquired in Portugal, and actually belonged to himself. Soon after this, William Cecil, Elizabeth's Lord High Treasurer, wrote to Mendes to assure him of English backing should the Sultan ever be subjected to such a case. Barton received criticism from the Queen for relying excessively on David Passi's counsel, suggesting that she was skeptical of Passi's allegiances

The Grand Vizier informed Antonio in March 1591 that the Sultan had resolved to defend and assist him in ascending to the Portuguese throne through an alliance with the English. The Ottomans had a practise of detaining the sons of Kings who formed an alliance with them, which explains why the Grand Vizier asked that Antonio send his son as a captive to Istanbul. Antonio was assured by Koca Sinan Pasha that Passi would provide him with more thorough information. Passi, on the other hand, was informing Philip II of these plans. The Venetian ambassador to the Ottoman Empire found that a Spanish agent, Giovanni Steffano Ferrari, was providing a salary to Passi for his services.

=== Spying for Spain ===
Passi sent Guglielmo di Savoy to Spain in February 1591 to inform Philip II that the Ottoman and English fleets were in preparations for an attack, and that if the invasion of Spain is abandoned, Malta or Morocco will be selected for attack. The English had promised the Ottomans Villefranche, Toulon, or Marseille if they could successfully depose Philip II and place António on the throne. Passi was aware of this as he was in the daily meetings where Koca Sinan Pasha, among other High-ranking individuals, discussed and oversaw the naval preparation, which was called in January 1590.

=== Fall from grace ===
Only a month after this, Passi fell from grace with the Ottomans as he sent a defamatory letter to the Grand Chancellor of Poland regarding Koca Sinan Pasha, in which he referred to him by stating:

"wrote the letter of accord and reconciliation on his own authority only, without binding the Sultan, and this with a view to deceiving… and drawing money."

Koca Sinan Pasha frequently detailed how Passi obstructed negotiations for the Ottoman–Polish peace and the delivery of Polish tribute to the Ottomans in his reports; his accounts of the breakdown of Ottoman–Polish relations are further testament that the Grand Vizier did indeed consult with the Sultan before offering peace to the Polish, rendering Passi's statements defamatory.

Koca Sinan Pasha gave the order for Passi's immediate detention at midnight, but Passi wasn't home. David Passi hid out at Saatçi Hasan Paşa's house after learning of the warrant for his arrest. Close friends of Passi such as Hasan Pasha, Occhiali, and Cığalazade Yusuf Sinan Pasha, pleaded with Sultan Murad III to forgive him, and that he was 'the only truthful and well-informed spy against Christian powers'.

Koca Sinan Pasha argued that Passi was a spy for the Spanish or Venetians, but Murad III remained unconvinced at first. On May 18, 1591, the Sultan ordered the immediate release of Passi. However, Koca Sinan Pasha was able to turn things around once and for all as on July 15, 1591, he had David Passi publicly chained and exiled to Rhodes.

After Koca Sinan Pasha himself was dismissed on August 2, 1591, Passi's son, Arslan, wrote a letter to Murad III for the release of his father who had been 'innocently exiled to Rhodes due to ill will'. Despite confirmation from Baron de la Fage (a French noble in Ottoman service as a spy) that Passi was a double agent, just a week later, on August 9, 1591, the Sultan ordered the Governor of Rhodes to set Passi free and send him back to Istanbul.

=== 1600 Janissary revolt ===
In 1600, Jewish businesswoman Esperanza Malchi (often confused with Esther Handali), both of whom were financial advisors to Mehmed III, was on her way to seek refuge in Passi's mansion against the Sipahis during a rebellion which was caused by the devaluation of the akçe, affecting the fixed incomes of Janissaries and Sipahis. Malchi was intercepted and assassinated alongside her eldest son near Passi's house (who was kaymakam of Istanbul at the time). Both of their lifeless bodies were dragged all the way to Sultanahmet square. Malchi's second son escaped, and her youngest son took on the name of Aksak Mustafa Çavuş, and converted to Islam. Her assassination was seen as a hard blow to the Jewish community of Istanbul. Passi, on the other hand, was badly beaten during the event as he was also a financial adviser to Mehmed III, and was believed to be dead for a while.

== Fate ==
There are contrasting accounts on Passi's fate. German–Indian scholar Suraiya Faroqhi claims that Passi was free between 1591 and 1592, but was imprisoned and most likely executed by Koca Sinan Pasha in 1593, after he had assumed power as Grand Vizier for the third time on January 28, 1593.

Turkish–Jewish historian Naim Güleryüz conversely claims that when Halil Pasha (Passi) returned to Istanbul following Koca Sinan Pasha's death in 1596, he was pardoned and honored with the rank of Kapudan Pasha, and did not engage in state affairs or spying again.

Güleryüz's account is more likely to be the closest to the truth as between 1595 and 1599, Halil Pasha is recorded as Grand Admiral on Ottoman records, just before Cığalazade Yusuf Sinan Pasha became Kapudan Pasha. However, Passi was kaymakam in 1600 which meant that he continued to participate in state affairs.
