= Wilhelm Souchon =

German admiral (1864–1946)

- Souchon probably before World War I
- Born: 2 June 1864; Leipzig, Kingdom of Saxony
- Died: 13 January 1946 (aged 81); Bremen, Allied-occupied Germany
- Relatives: Hermann Souchon
- Military career
- Allegiance: German Empire; Ottoman Empire
- Branch: Imperial German Navy; Ottoman Navy
- Service years: 1881–1919
- Rank: Admiral
- Commands: Mittelmeerdivision
- Conflicts: First World War; Bombardment of Bone; Bombardment of Philippeville; Black Sea Raid; Battle of Cape Sarych; Operation Albion
- Awards: Pour le Mérite

Wilhelm Anton Souchon (German pronunciation: [suˈʃɔŋ]; 2 June 1864 – 13 January 1946) was a German admiral in World War I. Souchon commanded the Kaiserliche Marine's Mediterranean squadron in the early days of the war. His initiatives played a major part in the entry of the Ottoman Empire into World War I.

== Biography ==
=== Early life and career ===
Wilhelm Anton Souchon was born on 2 June 1864 in Leipzig Saxony, to a family of Huguenot ancestry. His father was an artist and his mother the daughter of a Berlin banker.

Souchon entered the Imperial German Naval Academy on 12 April 1881. After graduation he served on board the corvette Leipzig when it participated in the coastal colonisation of German South-West Africa in 1884. In 1884 Souchon, with the rank of Kapitän, had risen to command a training ship specialising in mine laying techniques.

Between 1884 and 1903 Souchon progressed through several sea going and staff positions, reaching the rank of Korvettenkapitän in what was a steadily expanding navy. In 1904 he was appointed as chief of staff to a cruiser squadron stationed in East Asia. He undertook a number of diplomatic and liaison assignments in Japan, China and the Dutch East Indies.

Returning to Europe Souchon took up senior staff duties in the Office of the Imperial Navy in Berlin. After serving as chief of staff for the Baltic naval squadron he reached the ranks of Konteradmiral in April 1911 and Rear Admiral of the High Sea Fleet six months later.

=== Role in World War I ===
In July 1914, hostilities erupted between the Austro-Hungarian Empire and the Kingdom of Serbia. Rear Admiral Souchon feared being trapped in the Adriatic Sea in the event of other nations joining in the conflict. Because of this, Souchon took his two ships, the battlecruiser Goeben and the light cruiser Breslau, into the western Mediterranean. After the Germany declared war on France on 3 August 1914, he bombarded the French-Algerian ports of Bône and Philippeville on 4 August 1914. He successfully eluded British attempts to corner him) and on 10 August 1914, his small squadron arrived at the Dardanelles. The Ottoman war minister, Enver Pasha, granted Souchon permission to enter the Straits.

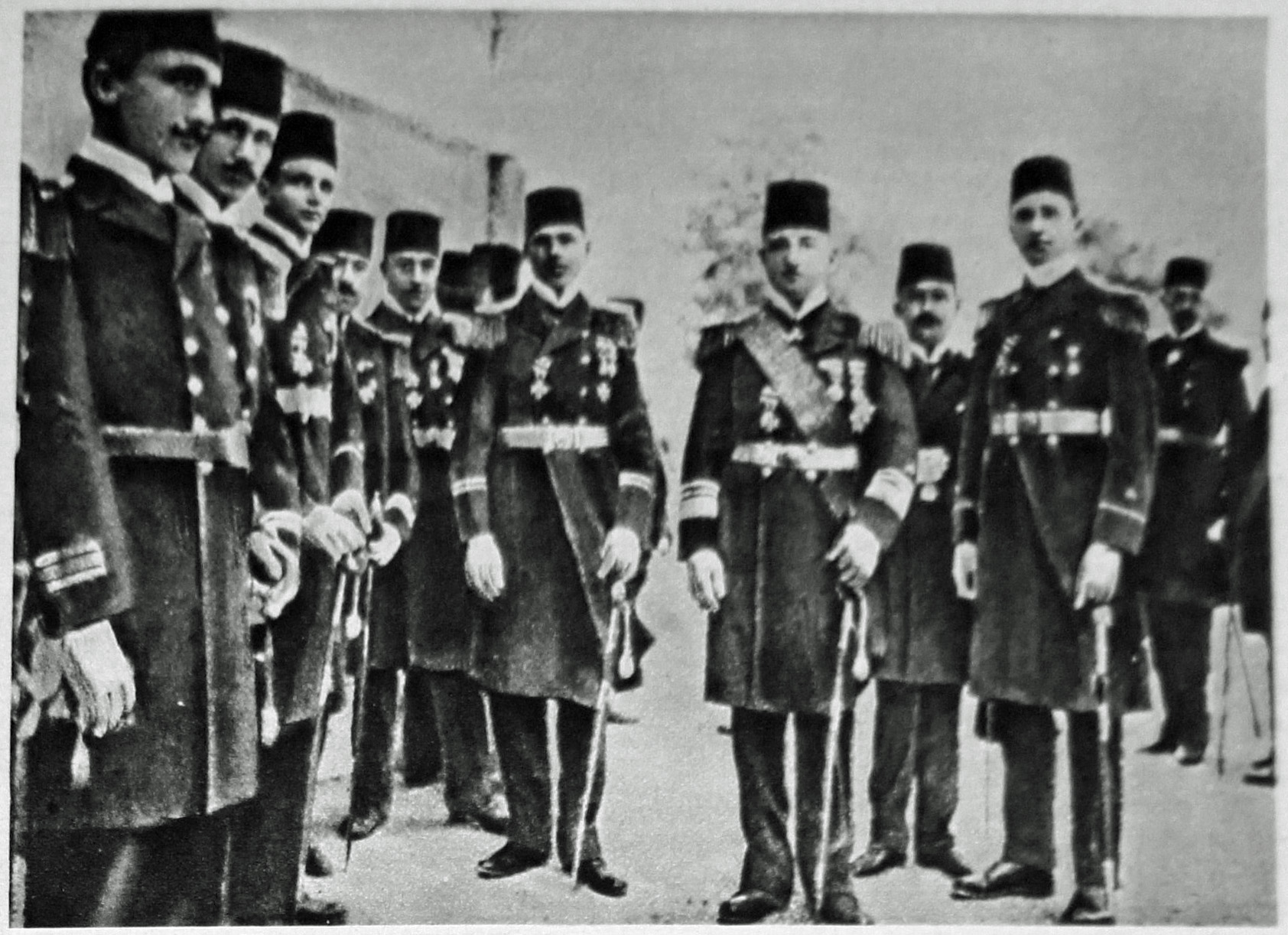
Admiral Souchon and his officers in Ottoman Navy uniforms

After two days of negotiations, the Ottoman authorities allowed Souchon to take his ships to Istanbul; they arrived there on 16 August 1914 and were transferred officially into the Ottoman Navy. On 3 September 1914 Souchon became the Fleet Commander of the Ottoman Navy; he served in this position until September 1917. On 23 September he became an Ottoman Vice-Admiral; this rank meant that he reported directly to the Ottoman Navy Minister, clarifying the chain of command.

The German Empire's "sale" of two modern warships to the Porte had an enormously positive impact in the Turkish population. At the outbreak of the war, Winston Churchill had caused Ottoman outrage when he "requisitioned" without compensation two almost completed Turkish battleships in British shipyards, Sultan Osman I and Reshadieh, that had been financed by public subscription. These ships were commissioned into the Royal Navy as Agincourt and Erin, respectively. On 15 August 1914, in the aftermath of Souchon's daring dash to Constantinople, the Ottomans cancelled their maritime agreement with Britain, and the Royal Navy mission under Admiral Limpus left by 15 September.

The Dardanelles were fortified with German assistance and the Bosporus was secured by the presence of Goeben (now Yavuz Sultan Selim). On 27 September 1914, the Straits were officially closed to all international shipping.

On 29 October 1914, Souchon's fleet launched the Black Sea Raid, a naval attack which brought the Ottoman Empire into World War I. His ships laid several marine minefields and shelled Russian Black Sea ports (Sevastopol, Odessa, and others), destroying the Russian minesweeper, Prut, in the process. British naval units quickly retaliated on Turkish merchant ships off İzmir. On 2 November 1914, Russia declared war on the Ottoman Empire. On 5 November, Britain followed suit and on 12 November 1914, the Ottoman government officially declared war on the Triple Entente.

For the next three years, Souchon attempted to reform the Ottoman Navy while conducting a number of raids on Russian shipping, ports, and coastal installations in the Black Sea. Promoted to vice admiral, Souchon was awarded the Pour le Mérite, Germany's highest military order, on 29 October 1916.

In September 1917, Souchon returned to Germany. He commanded the Fourth Battleship Squadron of the High Seas Fleet during Operation Albion in the Baltic in October 1917. Thereafter he was promoted to Admiral. By the end of the war, he was commanding officer of the Imperial Navy base at Kiel.

At the outbreak of the Kiel mutiny on 3 November 1918, Souchon asked for outside troops, but revoked his request for military help when his staff claimed the situation was under control. (Souchon had been deployed to Kiel a few days earlier on 30 October 1918, and had therefore to rely heavily on his staff.) On 4 November, the request had to be renewed. Altogether six infantry companies transferred to Kiel. The first unit (from Rendsburg) to reach Kiel was sent to the barracks complex in the Wik. The 180 men had to be withdrawn a few kilometres from the barracks because they would have stood no chance against the armed insurgents, whose numbers had by then swelled to several thousand. The other units reached Kiel much later, by which time the decision in Kiel had already been made. However, these troops showed signs of disintegration, and some joined the revolutionaries. Souchon had to negotiate and order the withdrawal of the units. In the course of the events, Souchon stepped down as governor and was replaced by the civilian social-democratic politician Gustav Noske.

=== Final years ===
In 1919 Souchon retired from a navy that had ceased to exist. During his remaining years he appears to have avoided involvement either in politics or in the recreation of the German Navy under the Nazi regime.

Admiral Souchon died in Bremen on 13 January 1946.

== Legacy ==
Souchon's nephew, Hermann Souchon (1894–1982), was the suspected assassin of Rosa Luxemburg.
