= Henry Felix Woods =

British admiral in the Ottoman Navy (1843–1929)

Henry Felix Woods Pasha
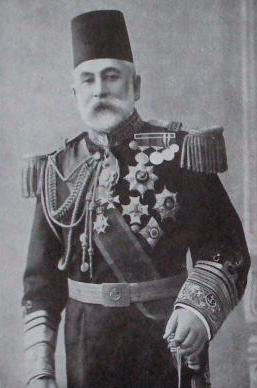
- Woods, inside plate of his autobiography "Spunyarn".
- Born: 18 June 1843; Jersey
- Died: 18 February 1929 (aged 85)
- Allegiance: United Kingdom; Ottoman Empire
- Branch: British Navy; Ottoman Navy

Sir Henry Felix Woods Pasha (1843–1929), KCVO, also known as Woods Pasha, was a British-Ottoman admiral and a pasha in Imperial Ottoman Naval Service.

A British naval officer, Woods was born in Jersey in 1843 and educated at the Upper School of the Royal Hospital School, Greenwich, which trained boys for the Royal Navy. After finishing at the top of his class, he entered the navy as a Masters Assistant. On 17 October 1867, he was appointed a Navigating Lieutenant (a rank which was formerly known as the Master).

He was attached to the British Embassy in the Ottoman Empire, and eventually joined the Imperial Ottoman Navy, where he was given the rank of Admiral. He was Aide-de-Camp for some years to Sultan Abdul Hamid II. After Abdul Hamid was deposed, he was reported by The New York Times to be present at the 1909 coronation of the succeeding sultan, Mehmed V.

Woods Pascha was invested as a Knight Commander of the Royal Victorian Order (KCVO) by King Edward VII at Buckingham Palace on 11 August 1902. He was awarded the Grand Cordon of the Medjidie and Osminieh and was a Knight Commander of the Saxe-Coburg Order. He died in 1929 in Constantinople (modern Istanbul).

== Publications ==
- Woods, Henry Felix (1924). Spunyarn: from the strands of a sailor's life afloat and ashore: forty-seven years under the ensigns of Great Britain and Turkey. London: Hutchinson & Co. hdl:2027/uc1.$b57547. OCLC 1080154967.
