= Lajos Tüköry =

Hungarian military leader

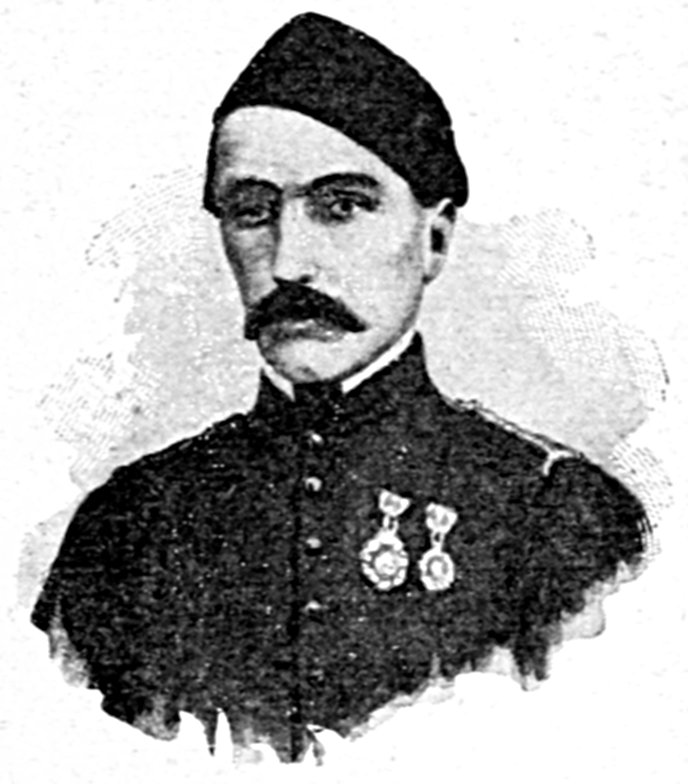
Lajos Tüköry

Lajos Tüköry (9 September 1830 – 6 June 1860) was a Hungarian military leader who fought alongside Garibaldi in the Expedition of the Thousand. He was killed during the siege of Palermo.
