= Antoni Aleksander Iliński =

Ottoman-Polish general

Iskender Pasha
- Skinder Basza
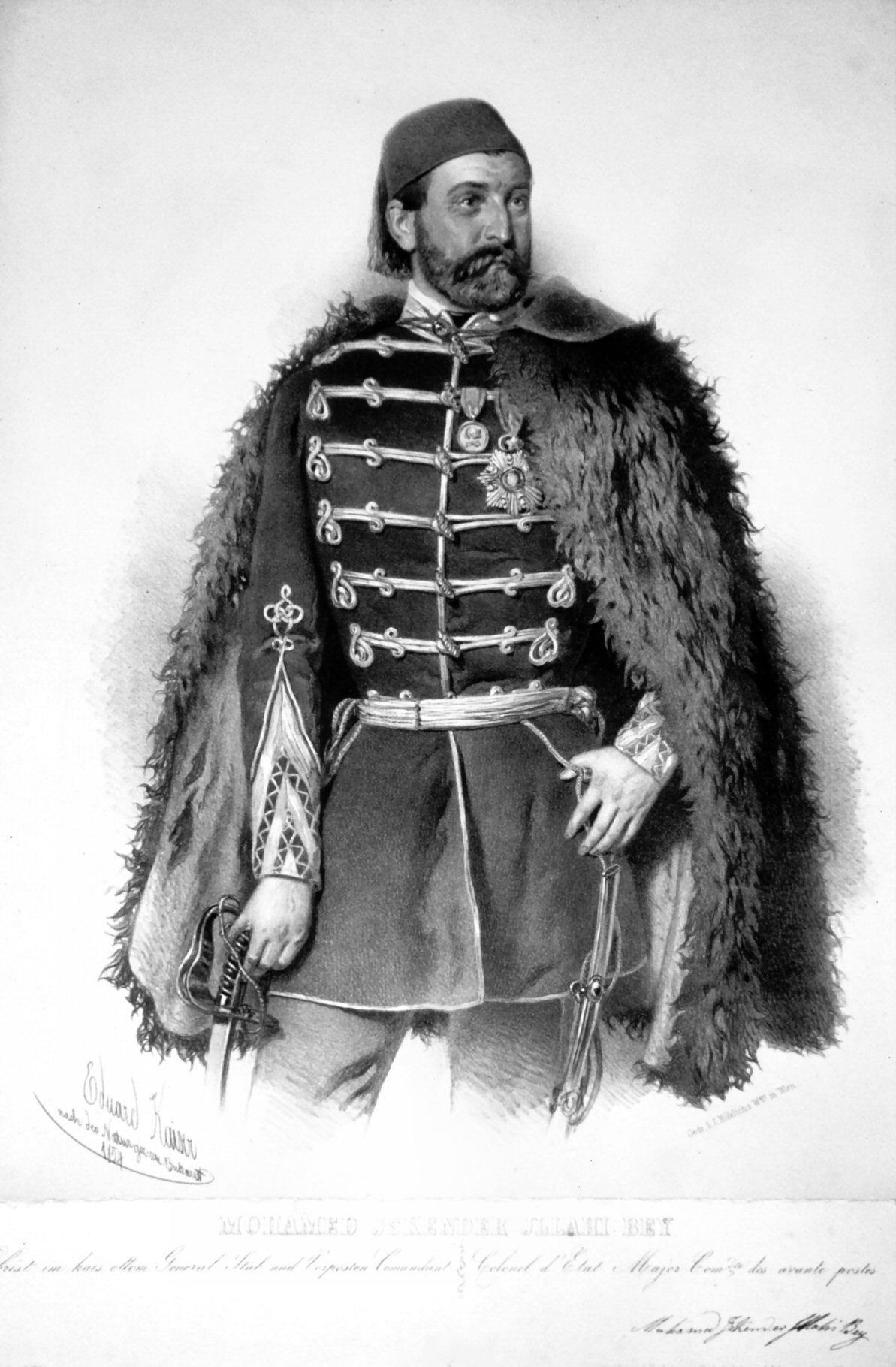
- Lithographic portrait of Iskender by Eduard Kaiser, 1854
- Born: Antoni Aleksander Iliński; 1812; Jarmolińce, Podolia Governorate, Russian Empire
- Died: 1861 (aged 48–49); Kostantiniyye, Ottoman Empire
- Burial place: Edirnekapı Martyr's Cemetery
- Military career
- Allegiance: Ottoman Empire
- Branch: Ottoman Army
- Service years: 1844–1861
- Rank: Major general
- Conflicts: November Uprising; Spring of Nations; Crimean War; Battle of Caracal; Siege of Sevastopol; Battle of Eupatoria

Iskender Pasha (Turkish: Mehmet İskender Paşa; Polish: Skinder Basza), born Antoni Aleksander Iliński (1812–1861), was a Polish-Ottoman military officer and general. A Polish independence activist and insurgent, he took part in the independence struggles of Poles and Hungarians against the Concert of Europe. He converted to Islam in 1844 and subsequently served in various commanding posts in the Ottoman Army during the reign of Abdulmejid I (1839–1861) in Bosnia and Herzegovina, the Danube, Crimea, Transcaucasia, and Baghdad. He was promoted to the rank of pasha during the Crimean War in 1855.

== Early life and conversion to Islam ==
Iliński was born in 1812 to a Polish szlachta family in the town of Jarmolińce in the Podolia Governorate. In 1830, he took part in the November Uprising as a young officer of the Lithuanian Legion. He was an active member of the movement of Polish exiles led by Prince Adam Jerzy Czartoryski from Paris. Iliński worked under the leadership of Józef Bem in his abortive Portuguese Legion attempt (1833), and in further struggles to form Polish legions in the Kingdom of Spain, France and elsewhere.

In 1844 he was arrested in Kostantiniyye, at Russian request, for allegedly working to organise Ukrainian Cossack legions under Sadyk Pasha's "Eastern Agency". The Ottoman authorities were indifferent, but Russia pressed for his handover for trial. To escape this, he consented to an offer to convert to Islam and assumed Ottoman nationality under the new name of Mehmed Iskender. He was immediately accepted as a lieutenant colonel in the Ottoman Army as 'Iskender Beg'. In the years 1848–49, during the time of Spring of Nations, he was again Bem's aide in Hungary.

== In the Ottoman Army ==
He served in the Army of Roumelia under Omar Pasha. He was a prominent figure in the military campaign that deposed and eventually executed the Herzegovina Vizier Ali-paša Rizvanbegović in 1851.

When the Crimean War broke out in 1853, he was charged with organizing and training the irregular troops (the bashi-bazouks) along the Danube. In the following year, Iskender Pasha's fierce and daring style in commanding successful cavalry raids on Russians brought him acclaim, and he was soon promoted to colonel.

In early 1855, he was posted to the Gözleve garrison in the Crimea, commanding a 400-strong cavalry regiment. His unit made a critical contribution in successfully repulsing a strong Russian assault on the town, which was threatening the rear of the Allied army besieging Sebastopol (see Battle of Eupatoria) This victory brought him a second promotion in a year, making him a pasha, (specifically a mirliva, equivalent to a brigadier general).

The same year he commanded the advance guard of an expeditionary army under Omar Pasha which landed at Sukhumi in the hope of relieving the Eastern Anatolian fortress-city Kars from a Russian siege. The city fell to the Russians, however, before the two armies could engage.

In 1857 he was again called to duty by Omar Pasha, who was appointed as the Governor and General Commander of Baghdad. He went to Baghdad and was active in the repression of tribal uprisings around Basra and in the Nejd area.

On his return to Kostantiniyye in 1861, he fell suddenly ill after an official banquet and died on 2 June 1861. He was buried there in Edirnekapı Martyr's Cemetery.
