= Solomon Eskenazi =

German–Jewish Ottoman statesman

Personal details
- Born: 1520 Udine, Italy
- Died: 1602 (aged 81–82) Istanbul, Ottoman Empire

Salomon ben Natan Eskenazi (Hebrew: סולומון אסכנזי, Turkish: Süleyman Aşkenaz) was born into a German–Jewish family in Udine, Italy, in 1520. (Note: According to M. Franco, Eskenazi was born in Germany) Eskenazi, alongside Solomon Aben Yaesh, is regarded as one of the most influential figures in Ottoman foreign affairs history. He died in Istanbul in 1602, aged 82.

== Life and career ==
After completing his medical education in Padua, (Note: According to Moshe Sevilla-Sharon, he studied medicine in Kraków.) he moved to Kraków for his new role as the physician of Sigismund II, King of Poland. Eskenazi, who later settled in Istanbul in 1564, worked as a doctor and translator for the Venetian Ambassador to the Ottoman Empire. He had first gotten in contact with Grand Vizier Sokullu Mehmed Pasha during the Cyprus War in 1570. Eskenazi, who won the appreciation of Sokullu, was tasked with the negotiation of many international issues involving the Ottomans for 30 years. After Sokullu's quarrel with Joseph Nasi, nephew of Gracia Mendes Nazi, Eskenazi was appointed to conduct negotiations with Venice after the Battle of Lepanto, and was appointed as ambassador to sign an agreement with Venice.

At this time, the Doge of Venice had signed a decree ordering the expulsion of all Venetian Jews. The Ottoman representative of Venice, who was helped by Eskenazi, made the following remarks and had the decision cancelled on 19 July 1573:

"Oh, how such an attempt would offend the Ottoman Jews, who have great prestige and influence in the Ottoman nation. This further goes to prove that gaining the support of the Turks is more important than the empty and false promises of the Papacy or Spain"

Another event in which Eskenazi was influential was following the death of Polish king Sigismund II Augustus, he persuaded Sokullu to support Henry III of France, son of Catherine de Medici, the widowed queen of France, among the various European dynasties that were eager for the throne.

Eskenazi, known as Alman Oğlu, meaning "the German son" in Turkish, also mediated conflicts between the representatives of England and the Vaticans in 1583, and in 1591, he ensured that Emanuel Aron was elected Voivode of Moldavia. Eskenazi also signed a preliminary peace treaty with the Spaniards, which he prepared on behalf of the Ottoman government and the Sultan in 1586.

When Murad III had heard that a Jewish woman was walking around with a diamond worth 40,000 ducats, he became enraged and ordered all Jews in the Ottoman Empire to be killed. Under the influence of Salomon Eskenazi, Grand Vizier Sokollu Mehmed Pasha, and Jewish businesswoman Esther Handali, the Valide Sultan ("Queen Mother") Nurbanu Sultan convinced his son, Murad, to revert his decision. In place, Murad issued an edict regulating the clothing of non-Muslims and restricting the trade and use of luxury goods within the empire. According to this edict, Jews would not wear turbans, but would wear red hats, black shoes, and cotton caps, in order to distinguish them from the Muslim population.

Imprisoned by the Prince of Transylvania during a trip in 1593, Eskenazi was released with the efforts of the British ambassador to Istanbul. He died in the Ottoman Empire in 1602. Bula Eksati, widow of Eskenazi, inherited her husband's medical wisdom, and cured Ahmed I of chickenpox "which could not be cured by any physician".

== Sources ==
- Charriere, Ernest (1848), Négociations de la France dans le Levant, Paris: Imprimerie Nationale
- Franco, M. (1897), Essai sur l'Histoire des Israelites de l'Empire Ottoman, Depuis les origines jusque a nos jours, Paris: Librairie A. Dublacher
- Galante, Abraham (1941), Histoire des Juifs d'Istanbul, despuis la prise de cette ville en 1453 par Fatih Mehmed II, jusqu a nos jours, vol. 1, Istanbul: Imprimerie Hüsnütabiat
- Galante, Abraham (1986), Histoire des Juifs de Turquie (9 vols.), Istanbul: İsis Publishers
- Güleryüz, Naim A. (January 2012), Bizans'tan 20. Yüzyıla - Türk Yahudileri [From Byzantium to the 20th Century - Turkish Jews] (in Turkish), Istanbul: Gözlem Gazetecilik Basın ve Yayın A.Ş., ISBN 978-9944-994-54-5
- Roth, Cecil (1980), Histoire du peuple Juif, Paris: Editions Stock
- Sevilla-Sharon, Moshe (1982), Türkiye Yahudileri-Tarihsel Bakış [Turkish Jews-Historical Perspective] (in Turkish), Kudüs: İletişim Yayınları, ISBN 9789754701852
