= Despina Storch =

Ottoman Greek alleged spy

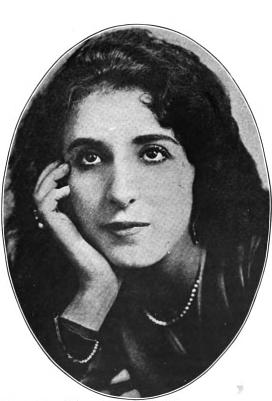
- Despina Storch, 1917
- Born: Despina Davidovitch; 1894 or 1895; Istanbul, Ottoman Empire
- Died: 30 March 1918 (aged 23–24); Ellis Island, Jersey City and New York City
- Other name: "Turkish Delight"
- Spouse: Paul Storch
- Espionage activity
- Allegiance: German Empire; Ottoman Empire
- Codename: Madame Nezie
- Codename: Madame Hesketh
- Codename: Madame Davidovitch
- Codename: Madame Despina
- Codename: Baroness de Bellville

Despina Storch or Despina Davidovitch Storch (1894 or 1895 – March 30, 1918) was an Ottoman Greek woman who was alleged to be a spy for Germany and the Ottoman Empire during World War I. Storch was later immortalized as "Turkish Delight", "Turkish beauty", and a "modern Cleopatra" in spy literature.

== Early life and travels ==
Born in Istanbul to a Phanariote Greek family of German and Bulgarian descent, Despina married Frenchman Paul Storch when she was 17 years old. Though they later divorced, their former marriage created a peculiar situation due to Paul's service in the French army while his ex-wife was suspected of spying for France's enemies.

Several factors led American authorities to suspect that Madame Storch was a spy. She traveled the capitals of the world frequently changing her name: "In Paris, for instance, she was known as Madame Nezie; in Madrid and London as Madame Hesketh; in Rome as Madame Davidovitch; at the New York Biltmore, in New York, as Madame Despina, and at the Shoreham, in Washington, as the Baroness de Bellville." That last name, "Baroness de Bellville", was used because she was accompanied almost everywhere by a mysterious Baron Henri de Beville (or de Bellville) in the last months before her arrest.

Despina Storch was a frequent guest at parties due to her remarkable beauty, a fluency in French and her dancing skill. At many parties she had no difficulty getting in contact with military officers who served for Allied forces and ambassadors of countries engaged in the war.

While in Madrid Despina Storch and the baron were noticed contacting German agents. After the couple became aware of the suspicions they quickly left Spain for Havana.

== In the United States ==
Later they made their way to the United States. They were accompanied by a German woman, Mrs. Elizabeth Charlotte Nix, and a man who purportedly was a French count named Robert de Clarmont.

As soon as the "a curious quartette" arrived in the U.S. they were "placed under suspicion by the Department of Justice".

One factor that aroused the suspicions of the Department of Justice was that she lived a life of a very rich lady, paying $1,000 per month for her stay in a New York hotel. Mrs. Nix also received an unexplained loan of $3,000 from Count Bernstorff.

Authorities later seized a safe deposit box held for a Madame Storch in a New York bank. It was said to contain important correspondence, with notable people from around the world, some of which was coded.

At first the co-conspirators were not aware about the scrutiny that they were under, and the Turkish Beauty led a "butterfly existence". She frequented "social affairs", adding new and important admirers to the long list of her suitors.

When the scrutiny became known to Storch she attempted to send her trunks to Panama, but those were intercepted. Realizing the danger that they were in, the Baron and Storch obtained French passports and made plans to flee to Cuba. After their plans became known to the Justice Department, all four were arrested on March 18, 1918, and sent to Ellis Island. The authorities tried to follow a suspicious money trail left by the four co-conspirators, but were not able to prove nor disprove that espionage had taken place. Eventually the Baron, Storch, and two others were deported from the U.S. as "undesirable".

=== Death ===
While on Ellis Island they all became ill; while three of them recovered, Despina Storch died on March 30 of what was described as pneumonia at age 23. At the time of her death the authorities believed that she died of natural causes, but some publications later indicated that she could have bitten on a poisoned capsule.

Her funeral took place on April 1, 1918. The New York Sun wrote:

An exquisitely carved white coffin containing the body of Madame Despina Davidovitch Storch, the most romantic spy suspect America has yet known, was placed in a vault on the east slope of Mount Olivet Cemetery, Maspeth, -Queens, yesterday afternoon. Thus was drawn the curtain on a life which in twenty three years knew more diplomatic intrigue than even the popular fiction spy heroine is given by Oppenheim and others.

Her funeral was attended by her faithful admirer Baron Henri de Beville, his parents, and a secret service agent. The New York Sun wrote, "The Baron, whose infatuation for the Turkish spy suspect entangled him in the web of her intrigues, wept silently and cast a last look upon the vault as he was led back to the car." The service was held in a Greek Orthodox Church although no one could present any evidences of which religion Despina Storch practiced.

The United States Government accepted the explanation of the Baron's parents, whose loyalty to France was beyond any doubt, that their son was an innocent victim and that "any suspicion which might have been aroused came from his devotion to Madame Storch."

With the death of their main suspect, the U.S. government realized that the case would never be solved, although The New York Times reported her alleged confession just before her death.
