= Hugh Pigot Williams =

Royal Navy Admiral (1858–1934)

Admiral Hugh Pigot Williams (1 September 1858 – 28 June 1934) was a British officer of the Royal Navy. In 1910–1912, while a Rear Admiral in the Royal Navy, he served as head of the British naval mission to the Ottoman Empire and Fleet Commander of the Ottoman Navy, at the rank of Liva Amiral.

== Naval service ==
Williams was promoted to captain on 30 July 1898. He was appointed in command of the third class protected cruiser HMS Phoebe on 9 October 1900, while the ship was in the naval reserve. One year later, on 1 October 1901, he was appointed in command of the cruiser HMS Brilliant, serving in the Portsmouth division of the Cruiser squadron. Brilliant was taken into Portsmouth for a refit in May 1902, and on 16 August that year Williams was in command as she took part in the fleet review held at Spithead for the coronation of King Edward VII. The following month she visited the Aegean Sea with other ships of her squadron for combined manoeuvres with the Mediterranean Fleet, returning to Portsmouth in October. Late that year the Brilliant was ordered back to Gibraltar for temporary service in the Mediterranean to protect British interests in Morocco, and in early February 1903 visited Las Palmas.

After his work with the Ottomans, he was promoted to Vice-Admiral in 1913 and retired in 1915. His rank was advanced to full Admiral in 1917 while on the retired list.
