= British naval missions to the Ottoman Empire =

In the lead-up to World War I, there were three British naval missions to the Ottoman Empire, sent to help modernize and reform the Ottoman Navy. The missions were led by admirals Douglas Gamble (February 1909 – March 1910), Hugh Pigot Williams (April 1910 – April 1912), and Arthur Limpus (May 1912 – September 1914). Despite enjoying extensive formal authority, with the heads of the mission serving concurrently as Fleet Commanders of the Ottoman Navy, the success of the mission was limited due to political instability, pro-German tendencies within the leadership of the Young Turks, and the involvement of the Ottoman Empire in the Italo-Turkish War and the two Balkan Wars in 1911–1913, which led to naval defeats and the loss of several smaller units.

== Sources ==
- Ewin, Toby (2023-07-03). "Time to Talk Turkey: The British Naval and German military missions to the Ottoman Empire in 1912–14". The Mariner's Mirror. 109 (3): 365–369. doi:10.1080/00253359.2023.2225320. ISSN 0025-3359.
- Langensiepen, Bernd; Güleryüz, Ahmet (1995). The Ottoman Steam Navy, 1828–1923. Conway Maritime Press. ISBN 0-85177-610-8.
- Rooney, Chris B. (1998). "The International Significance of British Naval Missions to the Ottoman Empire, 1908-14". Middle Eastern Studies. 34 (1): 1–29. doi:10.1080/00263209808701207. JSTOR 4283915.
