= Solomon Aben Yaesh =

Portuguese-Jewish Ottoman statesman

Personal details
- Born: Alvaro Mendes; 1520 Tavira, Portugal
- Died: 1603 (aged 82–83) Ottoman Empire

Salomon Aben Yaesh (Hebrew: שלמה יאיש, Turkish: Süleyman Yaeş, also known as Salomon Abenaes; 1520-1603) was a Portuguese-born Sephardic converso merchant and duke of the Aegean island capital Mytilene. Born Alvaro Mendes in 1520 in Tavira, Portugal, into a Marrano family, Yaesh, alongside Solomon Eskenazi, is regarded as one of the most influential figures in Ottoman foreign affairs history.

== Life and career ==
He traced his lineage to Yaish Ibn Yahya. He became involved in the courts of Portugal, England, Italy, and France. Trained as a jeweler, he worked as an apprentice to a goldsmith. Around 1545 he was in charge of the diamond mining industry in Narsinghgarh, in Madras, India where he became very wealthy. In 1555 he returned to Portugal and was raised to a knighthood by John III, but in 1564 after John's death was reported to be in Florence, and five years later in Paris. He was said to be in the confidences of Elizabeth I and Catherine de Medici.

Solomon held a grudge against Spain due to the Alhambra Decree, but had close contacts with the statesmen of Northern Europe. After the death of the King of Portugal in 1580, Yaesh backed Antonio I's claim to the throne over King of Spain Philip II's.

He arrived in Salonica in 1585. There he reverted to Judaism. He became involved in diplomatic affairs under the sultans Murat III, who elevated him to the nobility and granted him the concession of Tiberias along with Mytilene, and Mehmet III. He was appointed high commissioner in Constantinople and had contacts with the divan, and he maintained a elaborate intelligence network in Europe. In 1588 according to Giovanni Moro, the Venetian ambassador in Constantinople, he was the first to announce that the Spanish Armada had been defeated.

Solomon was given the title of Duke of Lesbos and appointed as the Palace Commissioner, filling the office vacated by Joseph Nasi for 20 years. He aimed to reach a Turkish-British agreement against Spain. He learned what was going on in European capitals thanks to his agents in Europe, and conveyed it to the Ottomans. The British Ambassador in Istanbul, Edward Barton, saw Solomon's direct correspondence with Elizabeth I as a threat to his office, and began to look for an opportunity to discredit him. Meanwhile, Antonio I, who demanded a large amount of money from Solomon, which he refused, accused him of committing illegal acts. Barton supported this accusation. The Queen was aware of the situation and sent a letter to the Ottoman Sultan, helping to acquit Solomon.

He was said to have presented a unicorn horn goblet to Cosimo de Medici, as mentioned by Andrea Bacci (philosopher) in his 1573 treatise. He was an architect of the Anglo-Turkish alliance. Yaesh ensured Britain's neutrality in a possible Ottoman-Austrian war in 1593. When Yaesh established friendly relations between the Ottomans and the British, it prevented the development of Spain, one of the powerful states of the region. He acted as a pro-English diplomat in the Turkish court. While he succeeded in securing English neutrality in case of war with Hungary, he did not achieve a full alliance.

He continued his duty as Duke of Lesbos during the reign of Mehmed III, who came to the throne after Murad III's death. He died in 1603. He had two sons, Jacob and Benjamin, and a daughter, Hanna.

== Bibliography ==
- Galante, Abraham (1986), Histoire des Juifs de Turquie (9 vols.), Istanbul: İsis Publishers
- Güleryüz, Naim A. (January 2012), Bizans'tan 20. Yüzyıla - Türk Yahudileri [From Byzantium to the 20th Century - Turkish Jews] (in Turkish), Istanbul: Gözlem Gazetecilik Basın ve Yayın A.Ş., ISBN 978-9944-994-54-5
