= Arthur Limpus =

Royal Navy Admiral; Admiral Superintendent of Malta Dockyard (1863–1931)

Admiral Sir Arthur Limpus KCMG CB
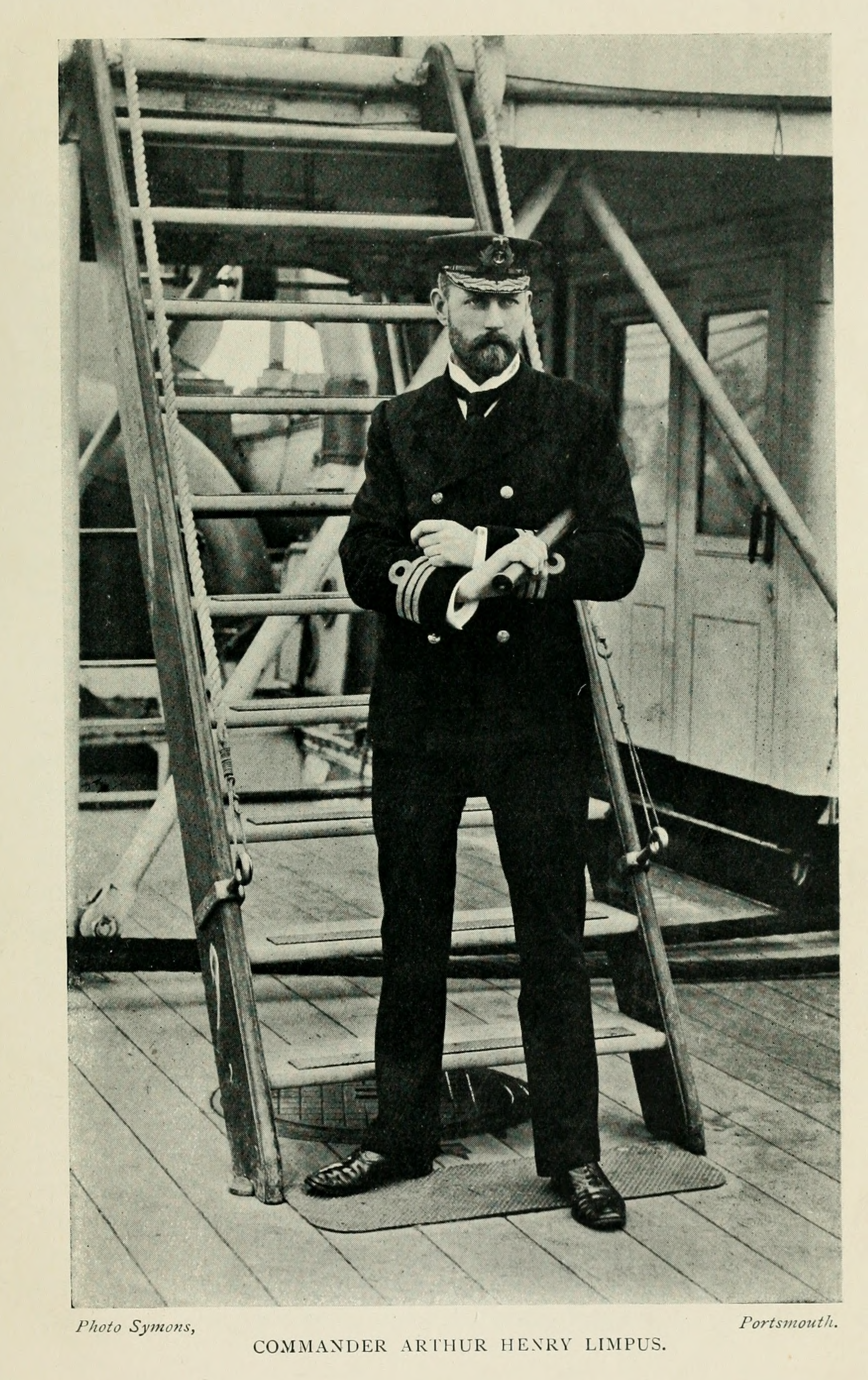
- Born: 7 June 1863
- Died: 3 November 1931 (aged 68)
- Military career
- Allegiance: United Kingdom
- Branch: Royal Navy
- Rank: Admiral
- Commands: HMS Gibraltar; HMS Albion; Malta Dockyard
- Conflicts: World War I

Admiral Sir Arthur Henry Limpus, KCMG, CB (7 June 1863 – 3 November 1931) was a Royal Navy officer who became Admiral Superintendent of Malta Dockyard.

== Naval career ==
Promoted to commander on 1 January 1898, Limpus was posted to the protected cruiser HMS Terrible when it was commissioned in September 1899 under Captain Percy Scott. The ship was intended for service at the China Station, but was delayed in South Africa following the outbreak of the Second Boer War. Limpus was attached to a naval brigade which accompanied the Ladysmith relief force, taking part in the battles of Colenso (December 1899) and Spion Kop (January 1900) and the actual relief of Ladysmith on 28 February 1900. He was specially promoted to the rank of captain on 2 May 1900, for his services in South Africa. The Terrible proceeded to China in March 1900, and took part in the Boxer Rebellion.

Limpus became commanding officer of the cruiser HMS Gibraltar in March 1901. The cruiser served as flagship to Rear-Admiral Sir Arthur Moore, Commander in Chief of the Cape of Good Hope and West Coast of Africa Station, and was thus involved in the closing phases of the Second Boer War in South Africa. Following the end of the war in June 1902, Gibraltar toured the East Coast of Africa, visiting Zanzibar with seven Royal Navy ships for a show of force following death of the sultan and the accession of his son in July 1902, and Kenya in August.

Limpus was appointed Naval Member of the Ordnance Committee in July 1905 and commanding officer of the battleship HMS Albion in October 1907. Promoted to rear admiral on 23 January 1909, he was appointed head of the British naval mission to the Ottoman Empire in May 1912. He became Admiral Superintendent of Malta Dockyard in September 1914 during the First World War.

He was promoted to vice admiral on 14 September 1914 and to full admiral on 30 January 1918.

== Sources ==
- Scott, Percy (1919). Fifty Years in the Royal Navy. London: John Murray.

Military offices
Preceded by Sackville Carden	Admiral Superintendent, Malta Dockyard; 1914–1916	Succeeded by George Ballard
