= Benveniste =

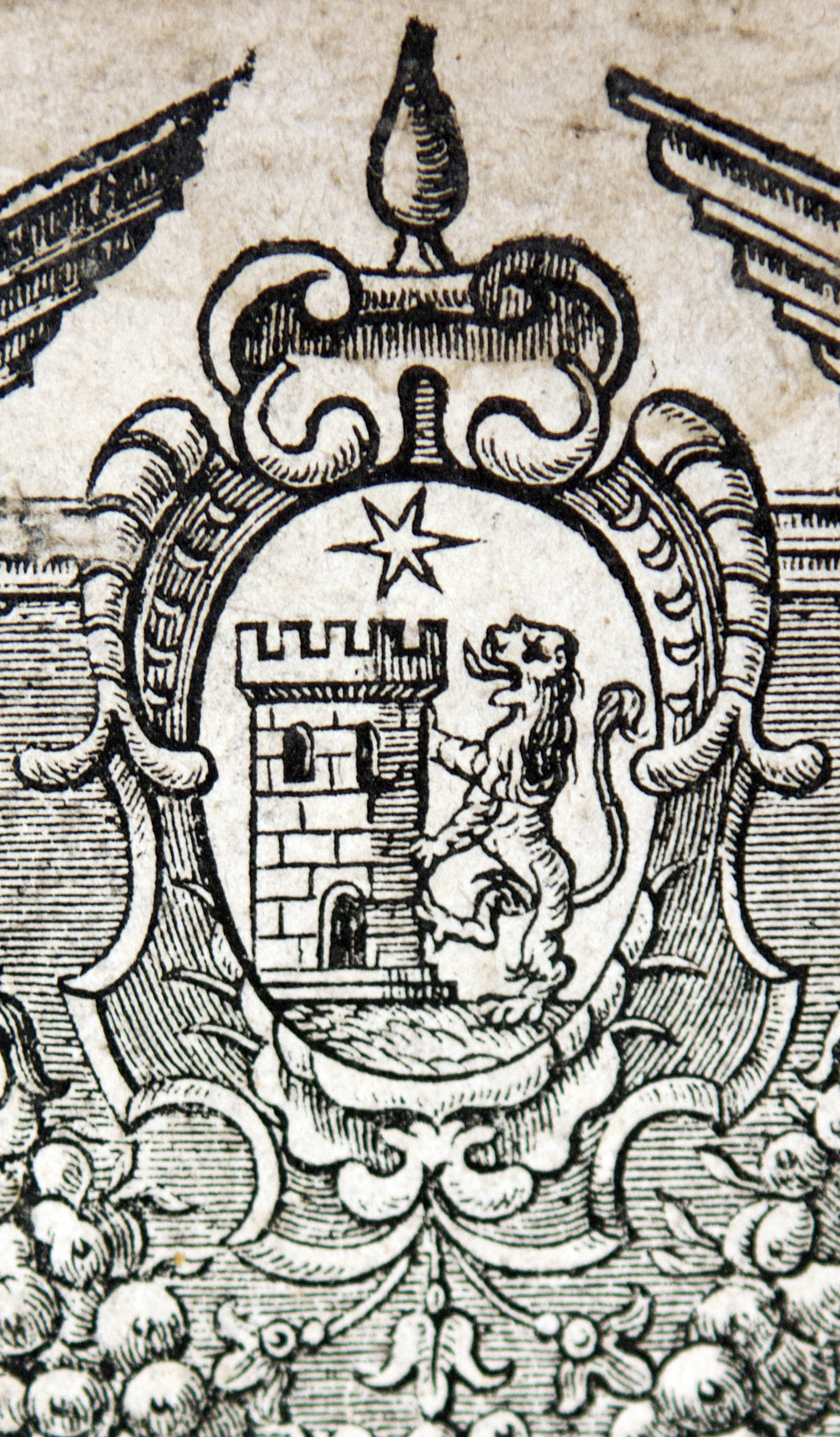
- Coat of arms (Printer's Mark) of Immanuel Benveniste, Amsterdam, 17th century. It includes the Star of David, a lion cub of Judah, a castle and 10 moons - the Kabbalist symbols of the 10 Sefirot (attributes/emanations). Probably the symbols in the coat of arms of Mendes/Benveniste families from Portugal and Spain.

Origin
- Languages: Spanish, Sephardi
- Meaning: Italian "Bene veniste" and Spanish Bien venida = welcome (or Bien viniste = your arrival was good).
- Region of origin: Spain, Greece, Israel, Turkey, Ottoman Empire, Western Europe

Other names
- Variant forms: Benvenuto and Benveniste (in Italy), Benvenist (in Catalonia), Benveniste (in Castile), Bemvenist and Bemveniste (in Portugal), Beniste or Benisti (in North Africa), Bienveniste, Benbeneste, Beneviste, Benvenista, Benvenisto, Ben-Veniste.

The Benveniste family is an old, noble, wealthy, and scholarly Sephardic Jewish family of Narbonne, France, and northern Spain established in the 11th century. The family was present in the 11th to the 15th centuries in Hachmei Provence, France, Barcelona, Aragon, and Castile.

Family members received honorary titles from the authorities and were members of the administration of the Kingdoms of Aragon and Castile. They were the baillie ("bayle")—the tax officers and treasurers, and alfaquim—senior advisors to the king and royal physician in Barcelona and Aragon in the 12th and 13th centuries. They held the title of "nasi" (prince in Hebrew), since they are considered by the Jewish tradition as descendants of King David and members of the House of David in the Jewish communities (mainly Barcelona) and were prominent religious and secular leaders in the 11th to the 14th centuries.

In the 14th to the 15th century, they held the titles of "Benveniste de la Cavalleria"—"of the knights" (a name given by the Knights Templar to their treasurers and tax collectors) and “don”—a noble person in Aragon and Castile. In the aftermath of the massacres of Jews which began in Spain on 6 June 1391, some such as the de Cartagena family converted to Christianity and became powerful conversos in Burgos. After the expulsion of the Jews from Spain in 1492, non-converts were dispersed mainly to Portugal, Greece - Salonica, other parts of the Ottoman Empire, and North African countries. In Portugal, they were forced to convert to Christianity in 1497 and became some of the richest traders and bankers (the Mendes family) of Europe. Today, the name is borne by families in Europe, the Americas, Asia, and Israel. It was also used as a first name.

== Origin of the name ==
The Italian name is a composition of the words bene meaning "well," and veniste meaning "you came." The name was given to babies, a welcome to the world, a way of thanking God for a descendant. The name was gradually adopted as a last name, relating to the father. There are many variations of the name in Italy and the Mediterranean countries: Benvenuto, Benvenuti, Benvenga, Benvenisti and more.

At this time one of the ministers, a sworn enemy of the Jewish minister, burst into laughter, and said to the king: "Your Majesty, that Jew-minister expert in our country's flora was making fun of you. He deliberately gave you a wrong name for that flower in order to embarrass you before your ministers and viziers. That is not a 'bienva,' but a 'malva'." The king angrily asked the Jewish minister to explain, threatening him with dire punishment. The minister said: "Your Majesty, I am ready to accept your judgment. But first, I beg you, hear me out carefully. Your Majesty, when we were out in the field, you asked me to tell you the name of that plant. There you were, standing before me, Royal Highness, and I thought: By no means am I going to offend Your Majesty by telling you the plant's true name, 'malva' – 'ill-going'! So I told you that the plant is called 'bienva' 'well-going'!". The king was mollified, and he said to the Jewish minister: "You have vanquished those of my ministers who wish you ill. I am pleased with your explanation. And to commemorate this occasion, I hereby; dub you bien veniste ('Benveniste') or 'your arrival was for good'".

Yet, the above nice family legend does not take into account the fact that in both medieval Iberia and Languedoc, before being used as a surname, Benveniste (from the Spanish expression bien viniste meaning 'you have arrived well') was used by Jews as a given name. It was one of the votive names typical for medieval Jews in southwestern Europe: it expressed a wish for the child to be welcome in this world. As many other names based on father's given names (patronymics), it gradually became a hereditary family name. Some sources claim that in Eastern Europe, the family adapted the surnames Epstein and Horowitz.

== People ==
=== The beginning - Narbonne, Aragon and Barcelona ===
Frankish Empire in the 5th to the 9th century and a map showing Charlemagne's additions (in light green) to the Frankish Kingdom, including Septimania

The first appearance of the name Benveniste was in the 11th century in southern France (present-day Septimania and Provence).

Earlier, in the 8th century, the region was shaped by Charlemagne from the Frankish Kingdom of the Carolingian. The big Narbonne Jewish center was established, according to Jewish and Christian sources by prominent Jews from Bagdad at the request of the Carolingian kings. The Babylonian names of Makhir, Hasdai, Sheshet and Shealtiel are the names of chief rabbis and leaders - Nasi (considered by the Jewish tradition as descendants of King David) of the Jewish center.

The numerically literate Sephardim assisted the Crowns of the Kingdom of Aragon and the County of Barcelona as tax collectors and advisers. In 1150 Aragon and Barcelona were united by the marriage of their rulers. The Sephardic Jewish families appear together with the name Benveniste in official and Jewish documents of Narbonne, Barcelona and Aragon from the 11th-13th century AD with the title Nasi added to their names. They appear in the travel books of Benjamin of Tudela from the 12th century.

- Isaac ben Josef iben Benveniste Nasi, also called as Iben Barun (c. 11th century), was a Hebrew grammarian, lexicographer and poet. He lived in Zaragoza (during the Islamic era) and Málaga and associated with the poets Moses ibn Ezra and Judah Halevi.

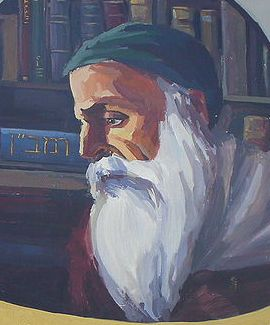
Bonastruc de (ça) Porta - Nahmanides

Kingdom of Aragon, County of Barcelona and the Kingdom of Castile (Castilla) in 1037

- Isaac Benveniste Nasi was the physician of the king of Aragon that came to Spain from Narbonne, France, in the 12th century. The father of Sheshet Benveniste Nasi.
- Sheshet Benveniste Nasi (c. 1131-1209) was a physician, writer, political advisor and diplomate to the kings of Aragon. He came to Spain from Narbonne, France, with his father in the 12th century. Sheshet received his education at Narbonne, his probable birthplace, afterward he lived at Barcelona, and later at Zaragoza, in which city he died. He practiced medicine, and was the author of a medical work, manuscript copies of which are still extant at Oxford and Munich. Such was his reputation as a physician that patients came long distances to consult him.
- Isaac ben Joseph Benveniste Nasi (died 1224) was the physician of the king of Aragon. He was the leading figure in the representative congresses of the Jewish communities convened at Montpellier and Saint-Gilles in 1214 and 1215 to consider protective measures in view of the approaching Lateran Council. Subsequently, he secured for the Aragonese communities a temporary suspension of the obligation to wear the Jewish badge.
- Vidal Benveniste de Porta (died 1268), Jewish Bailie ("bayle") - the tax officer and treasurer of Barcelona, Girona, and Lerida. His brother was Bonastruc ça (de) Porta, Nahmanides (in Hebrew Ramban), also known as Rabbi Moses ben Nahman Girondi (1194–1270), grew up, studied and lived in Girona. He was a leading medieval Jewish scholar, Catalonia rabbi, philosopher, physician, kabbalist, and biblical commentator. He participated in 1263 in the Disputation of Barcelona before King James I of Aragon.

=== Aragon, Kingdom of Castile and the expulsion of the Jews in the 15th century ===
- Vidal Benveniste (de la Cavalleria) was a Spanish Jewish scholar who lived in Zaragoza (the capital of Aragon) in the beginning of the second half of the 14th century and the beginning of the 15th century. The honor 'Benveniste de la Cavalleria', according to the Encyclopaedia Judaica, was given to the family by the Knights Templar who protected the family and the family in turn administered the tax system of the Templars. His family was connected to the development of the city of Zaragoza in the 14th century, and members of the family Benveniste de la Cavalleria were financiers of the local kings. He was elected, by the notables of the Jewish communities of Aragon, as the speaker before the pope at the beginning of disputation of Tortosa (1412).
- Abraham Benveniste (Bienveniste) (died in c. 1450) of Soria and Toledo, Spain. Statesman and chief rabbi (or "court rabbi") of Castile during the reign of Juan II (1406–54). He was also entrusted with the public finances of the kingdom together with Joseph Nasi. Under the presidency of Benveniste a Jewish synod in Valladolid in 1432 drew up a statute called the "Takḳanoth," which was to serve as a basis for the administration of the Jewish communities in Spain. It dealt with the divine service, with the glorification of the study of the law, with state taxation, and with the welfare and progress of the communities.
- Vidal Benveniste (de la Cavalleria) was the grandson of Abraham Benveniste was a prominent and a wealthy man in Spain in the second half of the 15th century. Together with his brother Abraham they negotiated a compact with the king of Portugal to allow 120,000 of the Jewish exiles from Spain in 1492 to stay in Portugal for six months. The Jewish exiles had to pay one ducat for every soul, and the fourth part of all the merchandise they had carried with them when they entered Portugal.
- Solomon ha-Levi (de la Cavalleria Benveniste), cousin of Abraham Benveniste, was the most wealthy and influential Jew of Burgos, an erudite scholar of Talmudic and rabbinical literature, and a rabbi of the Jewish community. His father, Isaac ha-Levi was bailiff of Alfonso IX and had come from Aragon to Burgos in the middle of the fourteenth century where he married Maria Benveniste, sister of Abraham Benveniste's father. He converted in the aftermath of the great massacres of Jews which began on 6 June 1391 and changed his name to Paul of Santa Maria. His intelligence and scholarship, as well as his gift of oratory, won the praise of Isaac ben Sheshet and also gained for him the confidence of King Henry III of Castile, who in 1406 appointed him keeper of the royal seal. In 1416 King Henry named him Lord Chancellor. After the King's death Archbishop Paul was a member of the council which ruled Castile in the name of the regent Doña Catalina, and by the will of the deceased king he was tutor to the heir to the throne, the later John II of Castile. His family and descendants used the last name de Cartagena and became the most powerful and "prolific converso family in Spanish history".

=== Sephardim in Portugal ===
- Francisco Mendes (Tzemah Benveniste in Hebrew) was one of the wealthiest traders and bankers in Europe in the first half of the 16th century. He was the great-grandson of Abraham Benveniste. His family was forcibly converted Sephardic Jews known as Conversos (also called crypto-Jews, Marranos and secret Jews). While still Jewish, they had fled to Portugal when the Catholic Monarchs, Queen Isabella I of Castile and King Ferdinand II of Aragon, expelled the Jews in 1492. Five years later, in 1497, they were forcibly converted to Catholicism along with all the other Jews in Portugal at that time. Francisco Mendes|Benveniste founded and directed the Mendes Bank, along with his brothers Diogo Mendes (Meir Benveniste) and Goncalo Mendes, from Lisbon and later from Antwerp, a powerful trading company and a bank of world repute with agents across Europe and around the Mediterranean. The House of Mendes|Benveniste probably began as a company trading precious objects. Following the beginning of the Age of Discovery and the finding, by the Portuguese, of a sea route to India, Goncalo Mendes financed ships (and possibly participated) in the Vasco di Gama missions. They became particularly important as one of the six families that controlled the spice trade in the Portuguese India Armadas (the kings of black pepper). They established with the other families a trading post in Antwerp from where they controlled the distribution of black pepper in Europe. They also traded in silver - the silver was needed to pay the Asians for those spices. They financed the kings and queens of Portugal, Spain, England, Flanders and the popes in Rome through the Mendes Bank, which became one of largest banks in the world of the 16th century along with the Fugger and Welser family.
- Gracia Mendes Nasi - Benveniste - Beatriz de Luna - (1510–1569) (Doña Gracia) was a Sephardic-Jewish-Portuguese businesswoman. She was the daughter of Philipa Mendes|Benveniste and Alvaro de Luna. She was married to her uncle Francisco Mendes (Tzemah Benveniste), inherited the Mendes|Benveniste fortune and due to her exceptional business acumen, became one of the wealthiest women in Europe of the middle 16th century. She returned to Judaism in Ferrara in the 1552 together with members of the Henriques-Nunes-Benveniste family (Meir, Abraham and Reyna Benveniste). In 1553/4 she left Ferrara together with her daughter Ana (Reyna) and (soon to be) son-in-law Don Joseph Nasi and the Henriques-Nunes-Benveniste family to Salonika and Istanbul where they settled at the invitation of Sultan Suleiman I. They were very active in trade, finance and in local and international Jewish life.
- Don Joseph Nasi, Duke of Naxos - diplomat, statesman and financier, nephew of Dona Gracia Mendes Nasi, and an influential figure in the Ottoman Empire during the rules of both Sultan Suleiman I and his son Selim II. He was a great benefactor of the Jewish people. A court Jew, he was appointed the lord of Tiberias, with the expressed aim of resettling Jews in Ottoman Syria and was appointed to the Duchy of the Archipelago from 1566 to 1579, a title usually only bestowed upon Muslims. In around 1563, Joseph Nasi secured permission from Sultan Selim II to acquire Tiberias and seven surrounding villages to create a Jewish city-state and encourage industry there. He hoped that large numbers of Jewish refugees would settle there, free from fear and oppression; indeed, the persecuted Jews of Cori, Italy, numbering about 200 souls, decided to emigrate to Tiberias. Nevertheless, a number of factors during the following years contributed to the plan's ultimate failure. This project of Gracia Mendes Nasi and Joseph Nasi was the only practical attempt to establish some sort of Jewish city-state between the 7th and 19th centuries.

=== Greece, Italy and Turkey ===
- Joshua ben Israel Benveniste (c. 1590 – c. 1668), physician and rabbi in Constantinople
- Chaim Benveniste (1603–1673), brother of Joshua, rabbinical authority at Constantinople and later at Smyrna

=== Other countries ===
- Immanuel Benveniste (1608–1664), printer from Amsterdam
- Émile Benveniste (1902–1976), French structural linguist
- Jacques Benveniste (1935–2004), French immunologist
- Asa Benveniste (1925–1990), American poet
- Richard Ben-Veniste (born 1943), American lawyer
- Guy Benveniste (1927–2022), French and American educator and planner
- David Benvenisti, (1897–1993), from Salonica and Jerusalem, Israeli educator and geographer, Israel Prize recipient, father of Meron and Refael and grandfather of Eyal
- Meron Benvenisti (1934–2020), Israeli historian and journalist
- Refael (Rafi) Benvenisti (born 1937), Israeli economist, brother of Meron.
- Eyal Benvenisti (born 1959), Israeli law professor, son of Meron
- Baruch Epstein (1860–1941), Lithuanian Rabbi, original family name was Benveniste

== See also ==
- House of David
- Abravanel
