= Chirana =

Kalfa of Nurbanu Sultan and Venetian spy

Chirana Kalfa or Chirana Hatun (born Chiara, fl. 1574 – c. 1595) was a Venetian spy who worked at Constantinople during the reign of Ottoman Sultan Murad III. She was the personal servant of Sultan's mother, Nurbanu.

== Biography ==
Chiara was born in Venice during the 16th century. She was recruited by the Council of Ten as a spy and sent to Constantinople, where, thanks to the intercession of the brothers Gazanfer and Cafer Agha, high-ranking spies close to Sultan Selim II, she was brought into the harem. With their help, Chiara, renamed Chirana, managed to rise through the ranks and in 1574 became the personal servant of Nurbanu Sultan, wife of Selim II and mother of the newly ascended sultan, Murad III.

Together with Esther Handali, Chirana formed a court faction with the aim of influencing Nurbanu towards a pro-Venetian policy, also exploiting the fact that Venice was Nurbanu's declared place of origin. Chirana achieved a high degree of influence and became very rich thanks to the bribes and gifts granted to her by the Venetian government.

After Nurbanu's death in 1583, she continued her work with Safiye Sultan, consort of Murad III and mother of Mehmed III. In 1591, a new Venetian spy, Beatrice Michiel (Gazanfer and Cafer's sister) arrived in the harem, who became Chirana's ally versus Esperanza Malchi, a close confidante of Safiye Sultan and an anti-Venetian agent.

== See also ==
- Kira (title)
