= Beatrice Michiel =

Venetian spy within the Ottoman court

- Born: 1553; Republic of Venice
- Died: 1613 (aged 59–60); Constantinople, Ottoman Empire
- Other name: Fatma Hatun
- Occupation: Spy
- Years active: 1591 - 1603
- Spouse(s): Angelo di Bianci (died 1588) Zuane Zaghis (m. 1589; sep. 1591) Ali Ağa (died 1603)
- Children: Giacomo di Bianci; An other son
- Parent(s): Giacomo Michiel (father); Franceschina Zorzi (mother)
- Relatives: Gazanfer Agha (brother); Cafer Agha (brother)

Beatrice Michiel, also known as Fatma Hatun (1553 - 1613), was a Venetian spy in service in the Ottoman court, under the sultan Murad III.

== Biography ==
=== Early life ===
Beatrice was born in the Serenissima Republic of Venice in 1553. She was daughter of the Venetian official Giacomo Michiel and his wife Franceschina Zorzi. She had at least one sister and two brothers.

In 1559, while sailing with her family in the Adriatic Sea to visit her father, engaged as a diplomat in Buda, they were attacked by Barbary pirates and taken prisoner together with the other passengers. While the mother managed to save or redeem herself and her daughters, her two brothers were taken to Constantinople, where they underwent the process of castration and were made to convert to Islam with the names of Cafer and Gazanfer. Later both made careers at the court of the future sultan Selim II, entering his intimate circle and that of his favorite, Nurbanu Sultan.

Meanwhile, in Venice, Beatrice married twice with Venetian aristocrats, first with Angelo di Bianci and then, widowed in 1588, in 1589 with Zuane Zaghis. From her first husband she had a son, Giacomo di Bianci, while the name and paternity of a second is uncertain.

From Constantinople, her two brothers managed to contact the family of origin. Between 1582 and 1584, their mother lived with them as a guest, and when she returned to Venice she was received with honors and money. Since Beatrice was unhappy in her marriage, in 1591 she too decided to flee to Constantinople to her brothers, abandoning her husband and children.

She converted to Islam with the name Fatma Hatun, married the protégé of her brothers, Ali Ağa, general of the janissaries, and was introduced inside the harem.

=== Spy ===
As a courtesan, Beatrice worked as spy for Venice, transmitting information of various kinds to the bailo. She did her job flawlessly, so much so that the bailo praised her to Venetian Senate, describing her skill at intrigue and her attention to all things regarding Venice, in addition to her ability to maintain the favor of the sultan's mother and consorts. She worked in parallel with Chiara "Chirana" Hatun, a Venetian spy sent to the harem from Venice who had been Nurbanu Sultan's personal Kalfa.

She also continued her work with the successors of Murad III. Beatrice was an ally of Esther Handali, while she was a rival of Esperanza Malchi, who promoted an anti-Venetian policy. The three women often clashed in front of Safiye in an attempt to influence her. In 1595, Beatrice wrote personally to the doge Marco Venier to inform him that she was working to counter Esperanza Malchi, and that Malchi was promoting an alliance between Austria and the Ottoman Empire against Venice.

In 1594, in anticipation of a Venetian-Ottoman war, she informed Venice of the strengths and weaknesses of the Ottoman fleet. With her brothers she obtained the release of Venetian prisoners and favored Venetian diplomats at the court. Her position at the court and the bribes received from Venice made her a wealthy woman, so much so that she was able to send large sums of money to her children. In 1600 one of the two, Giacomo, joined her in Constantinople, where he converted to Islam, and finally became a companion (musahibe) of Sultan Murad IV.

=== Death ===
In 1603 her husband and brothers were killed in a series of revolts against the shadow government of Safiye Sultan. Beatrice was saved and obtained an annuity with which she lived away from the court until her death in 1613.

== See also ==
- Kira (title)

== Sources ==
- Ioanna Iordanou, Venice's Secret Service: Organizing Intelligence in the Renaissance
- Eric R Dursteler, Renegade Women: Gender, Identity, and Boundaries in the Early Modern
