= Gracia Mendes Nasi =

Sephardi businesswoman (1510 – 1569)

- חַנָּה גַּרְשִׁיָּה נָשִׂיא
- Born: 1510; Lisbon, Portugal
- Died: 1569 (aged 58–59); Constantinople, Ottoman Empire
- Resting place: Tiberias, Israel
- Other names: Beatriz de Luna Miques; Hana Gracia Nasi; La Señora
- Occupations: Philanthropist, businesswoman
- Known for: Wealth and influence in Renaissance Europe; escape network for conversos
- Spouse: Francisco Mendes Benveniste (m. 1528; died 1535)
- Children: 1, (Reyna) Ana Nasi
- Relatives: Joseph Nasi (nephew); Reyna (Brianda) Nasi (d. 1556) (sister)

Gracia Mendes Nasi (1510 – 1569) born Beatriz de Luna Miques, also known as Doña Gracia or La Señora "The Lady", was a Portuguese Sephardi Jewish philanthropist, businesswoman, and prominent member of the Mendes Benveniste family. She became one of the wealthiest and most influential women of Renaissance Europe. As a widow, she took over the banking and trading enterprise Casa Mendes-Benveniste, which operated throughout Europe and the Mediterranean. Her nephew and business partner Joseph Nasi also became an influential figure in the Ottoman Empire.

During the severe repression of the Spanish and Portuguese Inquisition, she set up extensive escape networks to save hundreds of converso Jews fleeing persecution, established one of the first printing presses, and was an important patron of Jewish communities in Constantinople. She is also known for securing a long-term lease of Tiberias in the Safed sanjak (modern day Israel) from Suleiman the Magnificent. There, she financed the rebuilding of the city and created a safe haven for Jewish refugees, in an example of pre-modern aliyah.

== Biography ==
=== Early life ===
The Nasi-Mendes Benveniste family tree

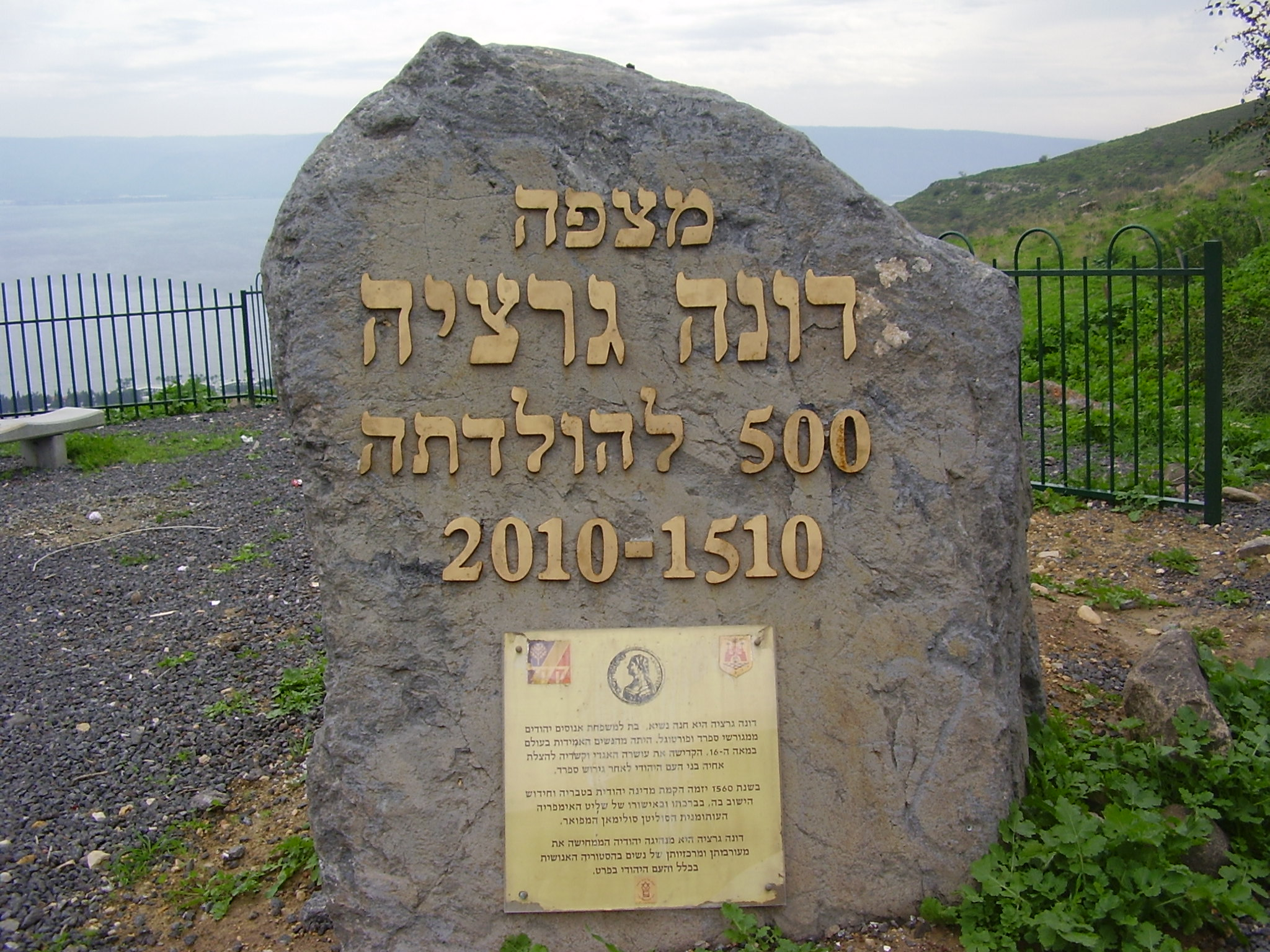
Memorial stone for Doña Gracia marking her 500th birthday in Tiberias, Israel.

Gracia Mendes Nasi was born Beatriz de Luna Miques in Lisbon, Portugal, in 1510, to a family of converso Jews (also known as anusim or Marranos) who originally came from Aragon, Spain. The de Luna family had fled to Portugal to escape persecution in Spain after the Catholic Monarchs of Spain expelled the Jews in 1492. Gracia's father was Álvaro de Luna (possibly related to Álvaro de Luna from Spain (1388/1390 – 1453)), a colleague of Don Abraham Benveniste. Her mother was Felipa Mendes Benveniste, the sister of the Mendes brothers, Francisco and Diogo, and granddaughter of Don Abraham Benveniste of Castile. Gracia had a younger sister, Reyna, also known by her Christianized name, Brianda.

Though their wealth shielded them from the harshest forms of Jewish persecution in Portugal, the de Luna family was forcibly converted to Catholicism in 1497, along with most Portuguese Jews, following King Manuel I of Portugal decree of expulsion. This was amongst a series of decrees and anti-Jewish measures which eventually led to the Portuguese Inquisition in 1536.

=== Marriage and ascent in the Mendes banking enterprise ===
In 1528, at 18, Gracia married her maternal uncle, Francisco Mendes Benveniste (Hebrew name Tsemach Benveniste, צֶמַח בֶּנְוֵנִיסְטֵי) in a secret Jewish wedding in Gracia's basement, and later in a public Catholic ceremony at the Lisbon Cathedral. A crypto-Jew and wealthy spice trader, Francisco was also a creditor and confidante of John III of Portugal. Like Gracia's mother, Francisco belonged to the prominent Benveniste family of Habsburg Spain. Gracia's sister Brianda later married Francisco's brother, Diogo.

Francisco Mendes and his brother, Diogo Mendes, ran an influential and globally renowned trading and banking enterprise, with agents across Europe and around the Mediterranean. The House of Mendes-Benveniste traded in precious valuables and engaged in currency arbitrage. With the onset of the Age of Discovery and Portugal's discovery of a sea route to India, the Mendes brothers became notable spice traders. They later expanded into silver trading, a crucial payment method for Asian spice traders.

Francisco died in the winter of 1535, leaving behind Gracia and their infant daughter, Ana. In his will, he divided his fortune between Doña Gracia and Diogo. This gave Doña Gracia immense wealth and significant control of the Mendes-Benveniste family fortune and enterprise.

After some time had passed, she asked the Pope if his remains could be put to rest in a new burial place. With the Pope's approval, she had Francisco's body moved to the Mount of Olives in Jerusalem.

=== Beginnings in Antwerp ===
In the years before Francisco's death in 1535, his brother, Diogo, opened a branch office of their house in Antwerp, Habsburg Netherlands, together with his relative Abraham Benveniste. Soon after Francisco's death, Doña Gracia joined Diogo in Antwerp with her infant daughter, Ana (future wife of Joseph Nasi) and her younger sister, Brianda de Luna. The move from Lisbon was timely due to the worsening political landscape for Jews in Portugal - Pope Paul III launched the Portuguese Inquisition in 1536.

Once in Antwerp, Gracia invested her family fortune in her brother-in-law's business, and started to gain a reputation as his business partner and independent business woman. The relationship between the de Luna and Mendes households became even stronger with the marriage between Beatrice's sister, Brianda, and Diogo Mendes. Diogo died in 1542, just five years after Beatrice Mendes settled in Antwerp. In his will he left his niece and sister-in-law control of the Mendes commercial empire, making Gracia an important businesswoman. During this period, she had to fend off constant attempts by various monarchs to confiscate her fortune through an arranged marriage to her only daughter, Ana, meaning a large portion of the family wealth would have come under the control of her daughter's husband. Gracia resisted all these attempts, which often put her in personal peril.

Starting in Antwerp, she began to develop an escape network that helped hundreds of fellow crypto-Jews flee Habsburg Spain and Portugal, where they had been under constant threat of arrest as heretics by the Inquisition. These fleeing conversos were first sent secretly to spice ships, owned or operated by the House of Mendes-Benveniste, that sailed regularly between Lisbon and Antwerp. In Antwerp, Beatrice Mendes and her staff gave them instructions and the money to travel by cart and foot over the Alps to the great port city of Venice, where arrangements were made to transport them by ship to the Ottoman Empire, Greece, and Turkey in the East. At that time the Ottoman Empire, under the Muslim Turks, welcomed Jews to their lands. The escape route was carefully planned. Even so, many died on the way as they traversed the mountain paths of the high Alps. The Jewish escape networks were known as "el camino dificil", "the difficult trail".

Under Gracia Nasi, the House of Mendes-Benveniste dealt with King Henry II of France, Charles V, Holy Roman Emperor, his sister Mary, Governor of the Low Countries, Popes Paul III and Paul IV, and Suleiman the Magnificent, the Ottoman Sultan. These dealings involved commercial activities, loans, and bribes. Earlier payments to the Pope by the House of Mendes and their associates had delayed the Inquisition in Portugal.

=== Life in Venice and Ferrara ===
In 1544, Gracia Nasi fled once more to the Republic of Venice, and took up residence on the Grand Canal. The city-state offered Jews and conversos a safer base to live and conduct business, although Jews were still confined in the Venetian Ghetto. Because of Jewish persecution, the Mendes family most likely still practiced Judaism in secret whilst presenting a façade of Catholicism. She continued trading pepper, grain, and textiles. While in Venice, a dispute arose with her sister, Brianda, Diogo's wife, regarding his estate. Nasi left yet again to the nearby Duchy of Ferrara to avoid the jurisdiction of the Venetian Giudici al Forestier (“Judges of Foreigners”), which was becoming involved in the dispute between her and her sister over control of the family fortune.

The city of Ferrara was eager to accept the Mendes family; Duke Ercole II d'Este (1508–1559) agreed to the terms of Diogo Mendes's will so that the wealthy family would move to his city, and received them in 1549. In Ferrara, Beatrice Mendes, for the first time in her life, could openly practice Judaism in a distinguished community and a city that recognized her rights. She adopted the Hebrew name Nasi (her daughter's name) instead of her Latin name Benveniste. Around this time is when she most likely became known as Doña Gracia Nasi.

The genealogy of her family becomes confusing here; this is most likely when her sister Brianda adopted the name Reyna, when Beatrice's daughter Ana became known as Reyna as well, and also when Brianda's daughter, named after Beatrice, was given the name Gracia. The family's new proud Jewish identity brought Doña Gracia beyond commercial business, and she became a large benefactor and organizer for resettling Jews using her commercial network throughout the Jewish diaspora. Doña Gracia became very involved with the Sephardi community in Ferrara, and actively supported the burst of literacy and printing amongst Ferrara's Jews. Books printed during this time, most notably the Ladino Ferrara Bible (1553) and Samuel Usque's Consolation for the Tribulations of Israel (1553), were dedicated to Nasi.

The move to Ferrara did not end the quarrel between Doña Gracia and her sister, Brianda (now Reyna de Luna), over control of the estate. To finally settle the dispute, Doña Gracia briefly went to Venice to settle with her sister in the Venetian Senate.

=== Constantinople ===
In 1553, after the settlement was made, Gracia, her daughter Ana (now Reyna Nasi), and her large entourage moved to Constantinople (now Istanbul) in the Ottoman Empire. There she arranged for her daughter to marry her husband's nephew and business partner, Joseph Nasi. This move in 1553, just as her others, proved to be just in time, as the political atmosphere of the Counter-Reformation Italian peninsula became hostile. In Constantinople, Doña Gracia lived fashionably in the European quarter of Galata. She had a very active Jewish life and assumed leadership in the Ottoman Sephardi world.

In 1556, soon after Doña Gracia arrived in Constantinople, Pope Paul IV sentenced a group of conversos in Ancona to auto-da-fé (burning at the stake), claiming they were still practicing Jewish rites. In response, Doña Gracia organized a trade embargo on the port of Ancona in the Papal States. The boycott ultimately failed and the conversos were burnt to death.

In Istanbul, she built synagogues, yeshivas and hospitals. One of the synagogues is named after her, "La Señora" (Sinyora Sinagogu), which still stands today in Izmir, Turkey.

== Jewish settlement in Tiberias ==
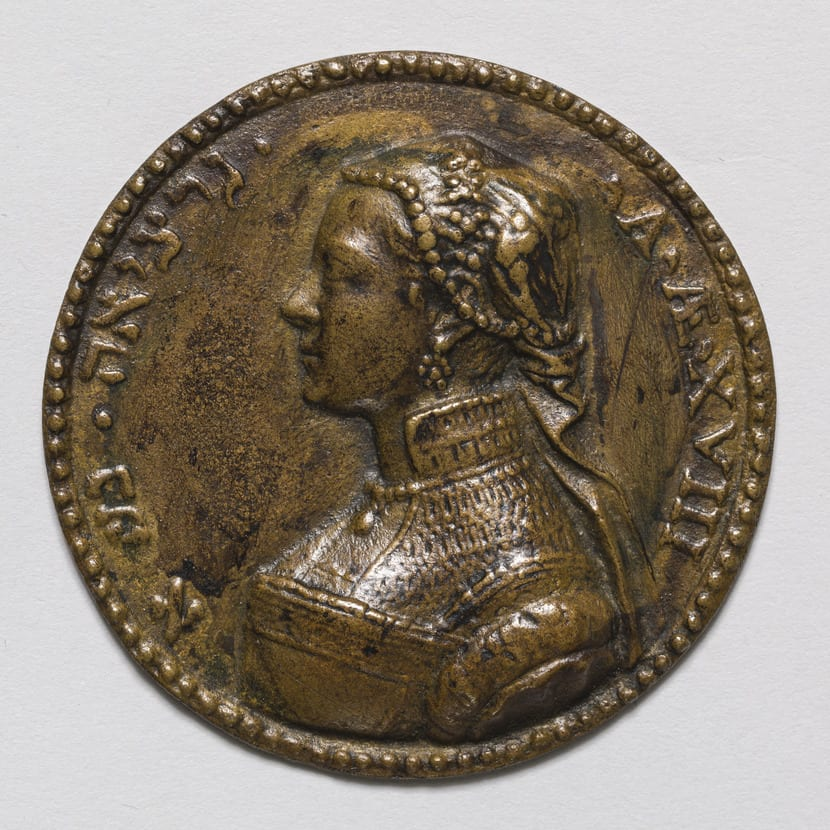
A medal of Gracia Nasi the younger (niece of Gracia Mendes Nasi), likely made in 1558.

In 1558, Doña Gracia was granted a long-term lease of Tiberias and its surrounding towns in the Galilee, modern day Israel (then part of Ottoman Syria), from Sultan Suleiman the Magnificent, in exchange for guaranteeing a substantial increase in the yearly tax revenues and 1000 gold cruzados per annum. Consequently, she obtained ruling authority over Tiberias, one of the Four Holy Cities in Judaism. Suleiman had recently conquered the Galilee some years earlier, but Tiberias was described as largely desolate. A Jewish community already existed in the city of Tiberias, and there were Jewish fishing communities aling the shore of the Sea of Galilee, as well as a Talmudic academy which Gracia would lend financial support to.

Gracia aimed to make Tiberias a self-supporting safe haven for Jews fleeing persecution as well as a major center for Jewish life, trade, and learning. With the permission of the Ottoman sultan and help from her nephew Joseph Nasi, reconstruction began in the areas abandoned towns to make for settlement by Jewish refugees. The reconstruction efforts were recounted by Joseph Ha-Kohen in his chronicle of Jewish history The Vale of Tears (1564). The move was especially popular in modern-day Italy, were Jews where facing severe persecution. The Jewish community of Cori near Naples raised funds to enable the community to emigrate on mass to Tiberias. Doña Gracia had a mansion built, and had made plans to settle in her semi-autonomous mini-state before her death in 1569.

A Jewish traveler who visited Tiberias around this time mentions how Doña Gracia had supported the Jewish community there, and how after her death they were compelled to ask for donations elsewhere. The venture has often been called an early attempt at a modern Zionist movement. Doña Gracia Mendes Nasi died in Constantinople in 1569.

== The Mendes Benveniste family after the death of Doña Gracia ==
After the death of her spouse in 1579, Gracia's daughter, Reyna, established her own printing business, one in Belvedere, near Constantinople, and another press in the Constantinople suburb of Kuruçeşme. She published at least fifteen books, including a tractate of the Talmud as well as several prayer books. She was the first Jewish woman to have established her own press rather than inheriting it, and the first woman printer and publisher in the Ottoman Empire.

== Legacy ==
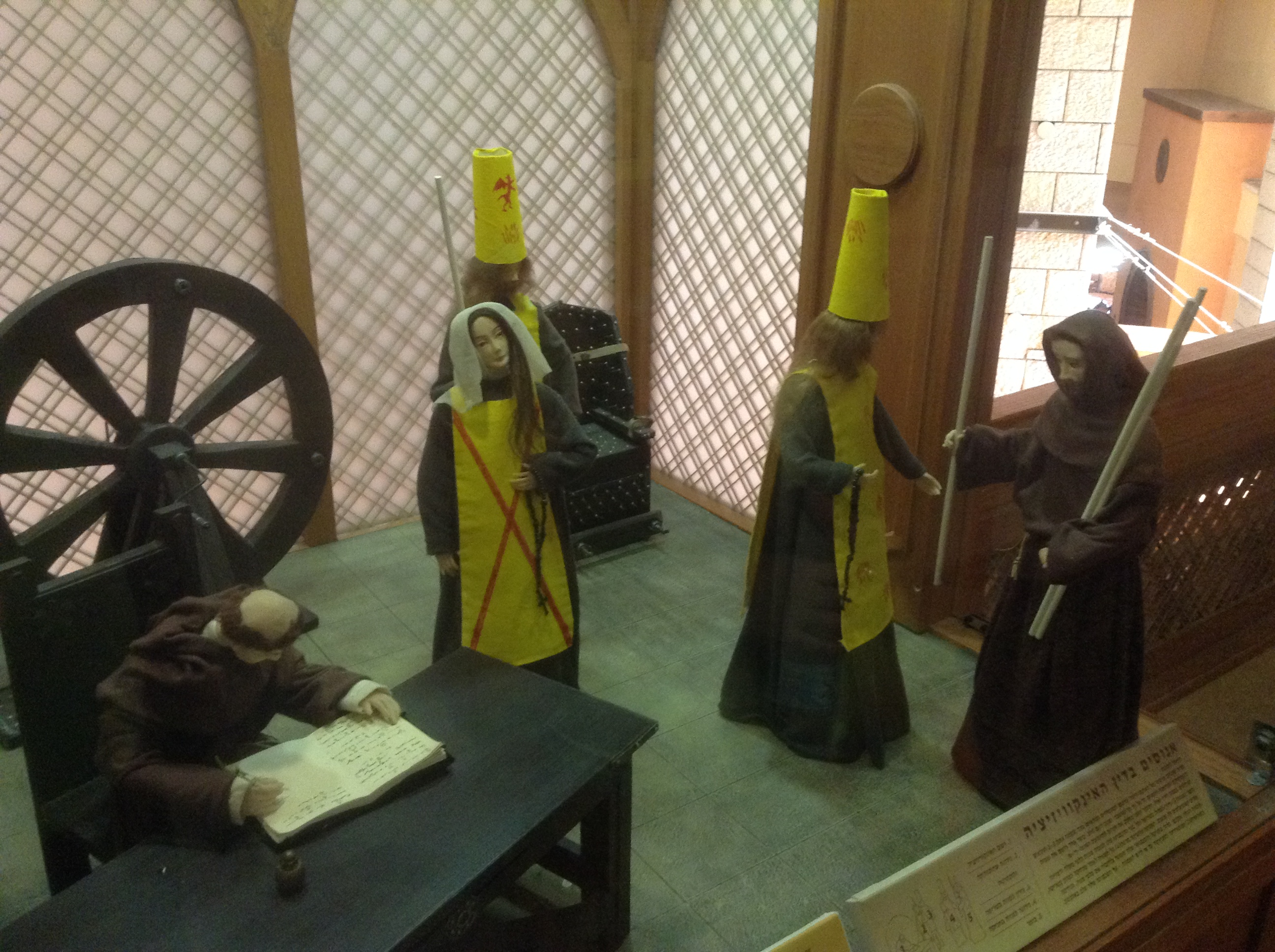
Inquisition and the Jews. Doña Gracia's museum in Tiberias

After Doña Gracia's death, her life and story remained relatively unknown for the next four centuries. In 1969, Jewish educator and historian Bea Statdler published a book length biography, The Story of Doña Gracia Mendes.

A museum and hotel dedicated to her was opened in Tiberias, Israel in the early 2000s. Israel's political leaders honoured her for the first time in October 2010. The Israeli Government Coins and Medals Corporation has produced a commemorative medal on the 500th anniversary of Doña Gracia's birth, and the Ministry of Education added a "Dona Gracia" unit into the Israeli school system.

New York City designated a Doña Gracia Day in June 2010, followed by a similar proclamation in Philadelphia a year later.

The Turkish government sponsored a Doña Gracia evening in New York in 2011 and a related exhibit in Lisbon. Turkish cultural organizations have advocated for exhibitions in Istanbul and Europe to commemorate her memory.

== In popular culture ==
In the TV series Muhteşem Yüzyıl, Gracia Mendes Nasi is portrayed by Turkish actress Dolunay Soysert.

== See also ==
- Benvenida Abrabanel
- Benveniste family
- Esther Handali
- Esperanza Malchi
- Joseph Nasi
- Nurbanu Sultan
