= Gazanfer Agha =

Ottoman courtier and politician

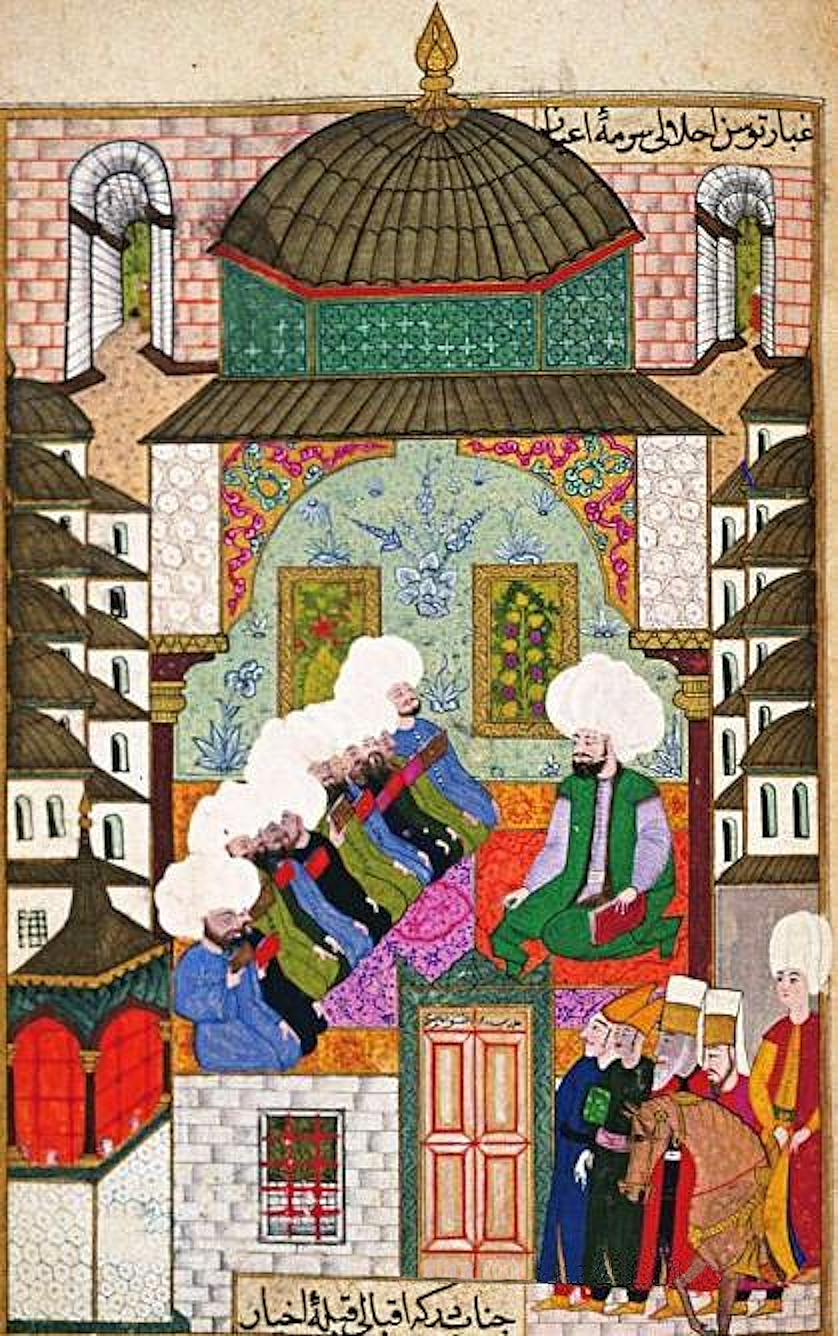
- Arrival of Gazanfer Aga at his madrasa. Nadiri's Diwan, c. 1605. Topkapi Ralace Museum Library, no. H.889

Kapıağası
- In office c. 1577 – 3 January 1603
- Monarchs: Murad III; Mehmed III

Personal details
- Born: Republic of Venice
- Died: 3 January 1603 Topkapi Palace, Constantinople, Ottoman Empire
- Relations: Cafer Agha (brother); Beatrice Michiel (sister)
- Parent(s): Giacomo Michiel; Franceschina Zorzi

Gazanfer Agha (died on 3 January 1603) was an Ottoman courtier and politician of Venetian origin. He held the office of Kapıağası for Sultan Murad III as part of a network of spies dedicated to manipulating Ottoman politics in favor of Venice.

== Biography ==
He was born in Venice to Giacomo Michiel, chancellor of Venice in Buda, and his wife Franceschina Zorzi. He had a brother and two sisters, one of whom was Beatrice.

In 1559, he was sailing with his family to join his father in Buda, but their ship was attacked by Barbary pirates. While his mother and sisters were later freed, he and his brother were sold into slavery in Istanbul and taken to the Grand Seraglio school at Topkapi Palace. There they were castrated and converted to Islam, taking the names Gazanfer and Cafer. They were assigned to the court of Şehzade Selim, who ascended the throne as Selim II in 1566. Gazanfer and his brother were part of the inner circle of Selim and his favorite, Nurbanu Sultan, and in 1577, during the reign of Murad III, son of Selim and Nurbanu, Gazanfer was appointed kapıağası and chief of the Enderûn, while Cafer became odabaşı (chief of the sultan's chamber). Both were nominated because Nurbanu, with her son's rise, became the Valide Sultan. In 1583, Nurbanu died and Gazanfer managed to ally himself with Murad's favorite, Safiye, who had also been an enemy of Nurbanu. In 1595, Murad III died and his son with Safiye, Mehmed III, became the Sultan, so Safiye became the new Valide Sultan and created a shadow government in the harem.

Having become a powerful man, he managed to get in touch with his family of origin. Between 1582 and 1584, his mother lived with him in Constantinople. Franceschina transmitted the information provided by her sons to Venice and when she returned, she was rewarded by Venice's government. In 1591, his sister Beatrice moved to Constantinople, where she converted to Islam, married a protégé of her brothers and became a Venetian spy. Later, Beatrice's son, Giacomo di Bianci, did the same. Gazanfer did not openly engage in Venice's cause, but became a conduit and ally for their network of spies at court, consisting of Beatrice, Chirana, and Esther Handali. He also maintained economic ties with Venice, depositing part of his fortune in the Mint of the Serenissima.

He died on 3 January 1603, during a revolt of the janissaries, ulemas and sipahis against the Shadow government of Safiye. He was beheaded in front of the weeping Mehmed III on the threshold of the third gate of Topkapi. Among the many who died with him were his brother Cafer, the husband of his sister Beatrice (who survived with her son, who later became a musahibe of Sultan Murad IV under the name of Mehmed Bey) and the kızlarağası Osman Agha.
