= Hajji Murad =

Ottoman Empire ambassador to France

Hajji Murad, also Hacı Murat, was an Ottoman Empire ambassador to France in the 16th century. Hajji Murad and his retinue travelled to France in 1565, on board a galley headed for Malta and then on two galliots which landed in Marseille in May 1565.

One of the missions of Hajji Murad was to claim back money which had been loaned to France by the Ottoman banker Joseph Nasi and the Ottoman Empire, from the time of Francis I, for an amount exceeding 150,000 écus. Charles IX met him in Bayonne on June 18. It seems Murad also discussed the ongoing Siege of Malta.

== See also ==
- Franco-Ottoman alliance
