= Eyal Benvenisti =

Israeli professor (born 1959)

- איל בנבנשתי

Whewell Professor of International Law
- In office 2015–2024
- Preceded by: James Crawford
- Succeeded by: Jan Klabbers

Personal details
- Born: 18 February 1959 (age 67) Jerusalem, Israel
- Parent: Meron Benvenisti (father)
- Relatives: David Benvenisti (grandfather); Rafi Benvenisti (uncle)

Academic background
- Education: Hebrew University of Jerusalem (LLB); Yale Law School (LLM, JSD)
- Thesis: Conflict of Laws and Belligerent Occupation: A Study in International and Comparative Law (1990)
- Doctoral advisor: Michael Reisman

Academic work
- Discipline: Public international law
- Institutions: Hebrew University of Jerusalem; Tel Aviv University; University of Cambridge
- Main interests: Sovereignty, belligerent occupation
- Notable works: The International Law of Occupation
- Notable ideas: Sovereignty as trusteeship

Eyal Benvenisti (Hebrew: איל בנבנשתי; born 18 February 1959) is an Israeli attorney and legal academic, and Whewell Professor of International Law at the University of Cambridge. He was formerly Anny and Paul Yanowicz Professor of Human Rights at Tel Aviv University's faculty of law. Since 2003 he has been part of the Global Law Faculty at New York University School of Law. He is the founding co-editor of Theoretical Inquiries in Law (1997–2002), where he served as Editor-in-Chief (2003–2006). He has also served on the editorial boards of the American Journal of International Law, and International Law in Domestic Courts.

Benvenisti is a member of the Israeli Law Professors' Forum for Democracy, established in 2023 to respond to the Israeli government coalition's plans for changes in the legal system.

== Early life and education ==
Benvenisti was born in Israel in 1959, the son of Meron Benvenisti. He earned his LL.B. (1984) at Hebrew University of Jerusalem. He went to the United States for graduate work, where he received a master's in law (LL.M.) (1988) and J.S.D. (1990), Yale Law School.

== Academic career ==
He returned to Jerusalem, where he started his academic career at the Hebrew University of Jerusalem, specializing in international law. In addition to teaching and research, he served as director of the Minerva Center for Human Rights at the Hebrew University (2000–2002). He was director of the Cegla Center for Interdisciplinary Research of the Law (2002–2005).

He is currently a professor of human rights at Tel Aviv University's faculty of law. His areas of teaching and research include international law, constitutional law and administrative law. He has served as visiting professor of law at Harvard Law School, Columbia Law School, University of Michigan School of Law, University of Pennsylvania Law School, University of Toronto Law School, University of Hamburg Institute of Law & Economics. A Humboldt Fellow at the Humboldt University of Berlin and LMU Munich and a visiting fellow at the Max Planck Institute for International Law in Heidelberg. Since 2003 he has been part of the Global Law Faculty, New York University School of Law.

He serves on the Editorial Boards of the American Journal of International Law, and International Law in Domestic Courts. Founding Co-Editor, Theoretical Inquiries in Law (1997–2002, Editor-in-Chief 2003–2006).

He is an Associate Member of the Institut de Droit International (2011).

In May 2015, he was elected Whewell Professor of International Law at the University of Cambridge. He took up this appointment in January 2016, and also became director of the Lauterpacht Centre for International Law. He left Cambridge in 2024 and returned to live in Israel. He represented Israel before the International Court of Justice in the Application of the Convention on the Prevention and Punishment of Genocide case brought by South Africa, arising out of Israel's conduct concerning the war in Gaza.

== Awards ==
In 2012 he won the European Research Council Advanced Grant.

== Publications ==
=== Books ===
- Sharing Transboundary Resources: International Law and Optimal Resource Use. (Cambridge University Press, 2002).
- The International Law of Occupation (Princeton University Press, 1993) (paperback edition with a new preface, 2004) (second edition, forthcoming by Oxford University Press).
- Private Property and the Israeli-Palestinian Settlement (The Jerusalem Institute for Israel Studies, 1998, in Hebrew) (co-author: Eyal Zamir).
- The Legal Status of Lands Acquired by Israelis before 1948 in the West Bank, Gaza Strip and East Jerusalem (The Jerusalem Institute for Israel Studies, 1993) (in Hebrew) (co-author: Eyal Zamir) ISSN 0333-8681.
- Legal Dualism: The Absorption of the Occupied Territories into Israel (Westview Press, 1989)

=== Editor of following books ===
- Israel and the Palestinian Refugees, (with Chaim Gans and Sari Hanafi, Springer Academic Press, 2006).
- The Impact of International Law on International Cooperation (with Moshe Hirsch, Cambridge University Press, 2004).
- Challenges to the Welfare State in an Era of Globalization, (with Georg Nolte, Springer Academic Press, (2003).

=== Selected articles ===
- Rethinking the Divide Between Jus ad Bellum and Jus in Bello in Warfare against Non-State Actors, 34 Yale J. Int'l L. 541 (2009).
- National Courts, Domestic Democracy, and the Evolution of International Law, 20 Europ. J. Int'l L. 59 (2009) (with George W. Downs).
- Court Cooperation, Executive Accountability and Global Governance, NYU J. Int'l L & Policy (2009) (with George W. Downs).
