= Immanuel Benveniste =

Immanuel Benveniste (also Manuel Benveniste) (1608 in Venice – c. 1660 in Amsterdam) was an Italian Jewish printer in Amsterdam who printed many Hebrew works including an edition of the Talmud from 1644-48. He was one of a number of notable Portuguese Jewish printers at Amsterdam in the seventeenth century, including Manasseh ben Israel, David de Castro Tartas, and Joseph and Immanuel Athias. Benveniste also published the sermons of Saul Levi Morteira in 1652.

Benveniste’s printer’s device (which may have been the family escutcheon) showed an upright lion facing a tower with a star above. Apparently, later printers often “borrowed” this mark for various reasons. The first to do so were Ben Judah ben Mordecai of Posen and Samuel ben Moses ha-Levi, Ashkenazic printers who had previously worked for Benveniste. In their case, Benveniste presumably allowed them to use the mark, perhaps as a show of support for his former employees.
