= Strongilah =

Jewish businesswoman in the Ottoman Empire

- Born: Crimea
- Died: c. 1548; Ottoman Empire
- Other name: Fatma
- Occupation: Kira
- Parent: Eliyah Gibor (father)

Strongilah (died 1548) was a Jewish Ottoman businesswoman who later converted to Islam. She was the influential favorite and Kira of Hafsa Sultan, and possibly of Hürrem Sultan.

== Biography ==
Strongilah was the daughter of the Karaite Jew Eliyah Gibor from Crimea. She is the first kira in the Imperial Harem of which there is any information. She become a kira by presenting the goods of her merchant husband to the harem women. As a kira, she acted as a go-between and provided luxury items, medicine and letters.

Because of her services, Strongilah became the favoured kira of Hafsa Sultan. She was possibly the same kira who cured an eye illness of an unidentified sultan's mother and was greatly awarded for this. When Hafsa Sultan became mother of the sultan in 1520, she successfully asked her son to grant the descendants of Strongilah the right to freedom from any taxes and the right to own slaves, a permit that was renewed five times until 1867. Strongilah is known to have had a room in the harem, because it is noted that the fire of the harem in 1541 caused her personal material losses.

Due to the fact that there were several kiras working in the Imperial Harem in parallel, and that they were seldom documented by name (the different kiras are normally referred to only as kira, kyra, or Kyra Jewess), it is difficult to identify individual kiras and separate them from each other. In 1532, Hafsa Sultan sent a kira to act as a messenger to the Venetian ambassador Pietro Zen, and while the personal name of the kira isn't mentioned, it was likely Strongilah.

As she is mentioned to have a room in the harem in 1541 and Hafsa died in 1534, Strongilah appears to have continued her career in the harem after Hafsa's death. She may have been the same unidentified kira who is noted to have performed secretarial tasks for Hürrem Sultan's charity programs and has been mentioned in connection to Mihrimah Sultan, although Esther Handali could also have been this kira. Her later career may overlap somewhat with the early career of Esther Handali.

Strongilah converted to Islam under the name Fatma shortly before her death.
