= Isaac ben Sheshet =

Spanish Talmudic authority (1326–1408)

Isaac ben Sheshet Perfet or Barfat (Hebrew: יצחק בן ששת; 1326–1408) was a Spanish Talmudic authority, also known by his acronym, Rivash (ריב"ש). He was born in Valencia and settled early in life in Barcelona, where he studied at the school of Nissim of Gerona.

== Life ==
Isaac was a paternal descendant of Sheshet Benveniste, and a descendant of Azriel of Gerona through his father's paternal grandmother. Although Isaac, while still young, acquired a worldwide reputation as a Talmudic authority, and halakhic inquiries were addressed to him from all quarters, he led a private life, earning his livelihood in commerce until he was about fifty years old, when he was compelled to accept a position as rabbi. Together with six other prominent men of Barcelona, among whom was his younger brother Judah ben Sheshet and his teacher Nissim ben Reuben, he was thrown into prison on a false accusation. After his acquittal he accepted the rabbinate of Zaragoza; but troubles still awaited him. To the grief caused by the death of his brother Judah and of his son-in-law was added that due to dissensions in the community, stirred up by the dayyan Joseph ben David. Isaac in consequence accepted the less important rabbinate of Calatayud; but when he was on the point of leaving Zaragoza the leaders of that community induced him to stay. The peace, however, did not remain long undisturbed, and Isaac settled at Valencia, where he directed a Talmudical school.

After sojourning a certain time at Miliana, he settled at Algiers, where he was received with great honor.

A certain Spanish refugee who had settled at Algiers before him aspired to become the leader of the community, and, seeing in Isaac a rival, began to persecute him. To give to Isaac the power necessary to act against this man, Saul ha-Kohen Astrue persuaded the government to appoint Isaac rabbi of Algiers. But this won for him a still more powerful enemy in the person of Simeon ben Zemah Duran, who disapproved of any intervention on the part of the government in the affairs of the rabbinate.

Notwithstanding these events, Isaac was greatly venerated by the Algerian Jews, and pilgrimages to his tomb are still made on the anniversary of his death, which occurred in 1408. His tombstone was restored by the community of Algiers in 1862. It bears a Hebrew elegy, composed by Abba Mari ibn Caspi, and the following French inscription: "Ce monument a été restauré par la communauté Israélite d'Alger en I'honneur du Rabbin Isaac bar Chichat, né en Espagne, décédé à Alger en 1408, dans sa 82 année. Alger le 11 août, 1862." The accuracy of the date of his death given in this epitaph is, however, questioned by some scholars, who claim with some authority that Isaac died at least one year later.

== Works ==
Isaac was the author of 518 responsa, to which great halakic value is attached by men like Joseph Caro, Jacob Berab, and many others. They are also of great historical importance as reflecting the conditions of Jewish life in the fourteenth century. In some of them are to be found details of the author's life; but unfortunately it is impossible to trace these chronologically, the original order of the responsa having been altered by the editors.

Although Isaac was very strict in his halakic decisions, he was far from being narrow-minded. He has nothing to say against secular knowledge; he disapproves the study of Aristotle only because the latter professed belief in the eternity of matter and denied God's providence. Isaac's responsa evidence a profound knowledge of the philosophical writings of his time. In one of them (No. 118) he explains the difference between the opinion of Levi ben Gershom and that of Abraham ben David of Posquières on free will, and gives his own views on that complicated subject. He shows himself a decided adversary of the Kabbalah. His teacher says Isaac never spoke of the Sefirot, and Isaac cites the words of one of the philosophizers who reproaches the kabbalists with believing in the ten (Sefirot) as the Christians believe in the Trinity.

Isaac's responsa were first published, under the title She'elot u-Teshubot, at Constantinople in 1546–47. A newer collection of the responsa was published under the title She'elot u-Teshubot ha-Ribash ha-Ḥadashot by David Frenkl at Muncas. In addition to these, he wrote novellæ on the Talmud which are no longer in existence. They are mentioned by him in his responsa (No. 106), and some of them, on the treatise Ketubot, are cited by Bezalel Ashkenazi in the Shiṭṭah Meḳubbeẓet. Azulai says that he has seen a manuscript containing a commentary on the Pentateuch by Isaac ben Sheshet.
