= Sari Hanafi =

Syrian-Palestinian sociologist

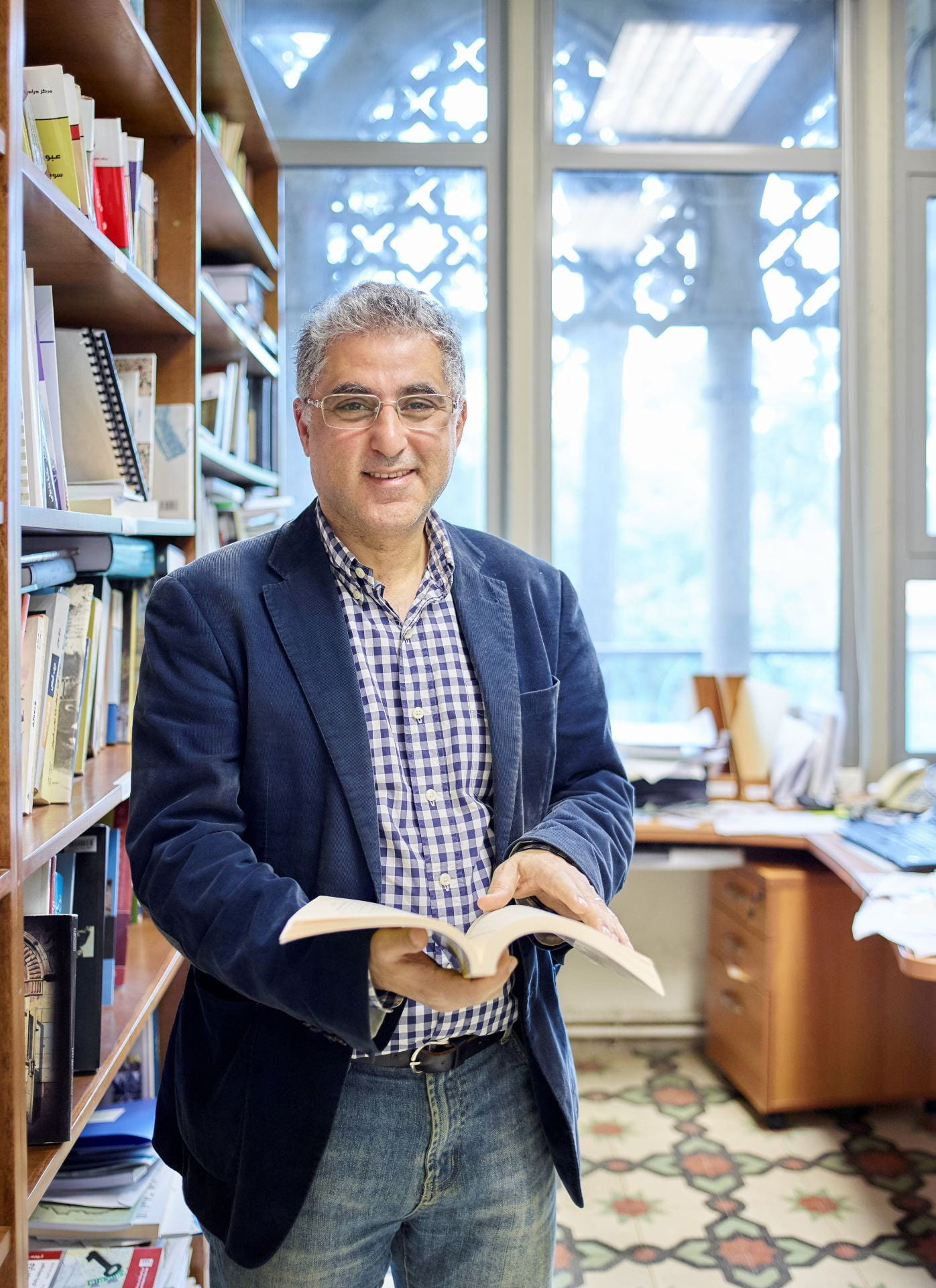
Sari Hanafi in 2016

Sari Hanafi is professor of sociology at the American University of Beirut and chair of the Islamic Studies program. He is the former president of the International Sociological Association and editor of Idafat, a sociology journal. In 2018, Hanafi founded "Athar", a research portal.

Hanafi was awarded the 2014 Abdelhamid Shouman Award and 2015 Kuwait Award for social sciences. In 2019, he was awarded an Honorary Doctorate (Doctor Honoris Causa) from the National University of San Marcos, and in 2022, Hanafi became an International fellow of the British Academy.

His forthcoming book is Against Symbolic liberalism: A plea for Dialogical Sociology (Liverpool University Press).

== Biography ==
Sari Hanafi is currently a professor of sociology, Director of the Center for Arab and Middle Eastern Studies and Chair of the Islamic Studies program at the American University of Beirut. He is the former President of the International Sociological Association (2018–23), the editor of Idafat: the Arab Journal of Sociology (Arabic) (2017–2022), and the Vice President of the board of the Arab Council of Social Science (2015–2016). Further, in 2017, he created the “Portal for Social impact of scientific research in/on the Arab World”.

He has also served as a visiting professor/fellow at the University of Poitiers and Migrintern and the Fondation Maison des Sciences de l'Homme (France), University of Bologna and Ravenna (Italy), Chr. Michelsen Institute (Bergen-Norway), Doha Institute for Graduate Studies. Hanafi is also a former senior researcher at the Cairo-based French research center, Centre d'études et de documentation économique juridique et sociale (1994–2000).

He is the author of numerous journal articles and book chapters on the sociology of religion; connection of moral philosophy to the social sciences; the sociology of (forced) migration applied to the Palestinian refugees; politics of scientific research. Among his recent books are: Studying Islam in the Arab World: The Rupture Between Religion and the Social Sciences] Knowledge Production in the Arab World: The Impossible Promise. (with R. Arvanitis); The Oxford Handbook of the Sociology of the Middle East] (co-edited with A. Salvatore and K. Obuse).

Due to his engagement and endeavors, Hanafi was awarded the 2014 Abdelhamid Shouman Award and 2015 Kuwait Award for social sciences. In 2019, he was awarded an Honorary Doctorate (Doctor Honoris Causa) from the National University of San Marcos, and in 2022, Hanafi became an International fellow of the British Academy.

His latest book is “ Against Symbolic liberalism: A plea for Dialogical Sociology”.

== Career ==
Hanafi holds a BE in civil engineering, a BA, a Masters and a Ph.D. in sociology, in which he attained the ph.D. from the Ecole des Hautes Etudes en Sciences Sociales-Paris (School for Advanced Studies in the Social Sciences) (1994). Presently, he is the Director of the Center for Arab and Middle Eastern Studies, a professor of sociology at the Department of Sociology, Anthropology and Media Studies, and the Chair of the Islamic Studies program at the American University of Beirut. Previously, Hanafi was also a faculty member in the Public Policy and International Affairs Program at AUB.

Hanafi was the President of the International Sociological Association (2018–2023)- the first Arab to join this committee since it was founded in 1948 and previously its vice president and member of its executive committee (2010–2018). He was the Vice President of the board of the ACSS (2015–2016) after being a board member(2012–2015). In this regard, Hanafi played a major role in establishing the sociological and social science's national associations for Syria, Palestine and encouraging other Arab associations (e.g. Morocco, Kuwait, Saudi Arabia, Oman, Jordan, Tunisia, and Algeria) to become affiliated with the International Sociological Association. From 2007 to 2022, Hanafi was the editor of Idafat, Arab Journal of Sociology, published in Arabic by the Association of Arab Sociology [8].

Evidently, Hanafi is a prominent engager in academics and universities, particularly with respect to their local societies and the acknowledgment of different regimes of knowledge. In this regard, Hanafi founded the Portal for Social Impact of Scientific Research in/on the Arab World (Athar), as a tool analyze and explore knowledge production and scientific research conducted in the Arab region.

== Awards ==
- Abdelhamid Shouman Award, 2014
- Kuwait Award for social science, 2015
- Honorary Doctorate (Doctor Honoris Causa) of the National University of San Marcos, 2019
- International fellow of the British Academy, 2022.
- AUB award: Board Designated Professorship, 2022.

== Research ==
Hanafi has conducted in-depth research on various topics related to knowledge production, sociology of religion (religious discourse and curriculum), connecting moral philosophy to the social sciences, and previously on refugee camps and civil society in the Arab world. Hanafi's H-Index in Google Scholar is 36 and he was cited 4,521 times. Moreover, during the 30 years of his research, Hanafi has published over 20 books, over 80 refereed book chapters, over 90 refereed journals, and many op-eds, in English, Arabic, and French. In addition, 37 of them were translated into other languages.

=== Studying Islam in the Arab World: The Rupture Between Religion and the Social Sciences ===
Studying Islam in the Arab World: The Rupture Between Religion and the Social Sciences. This 2023 Routledge book was a short version translated from Arabic (علوم الشرع والعلوم الاجتماعية: نحو تجاوز القطيعة- أليس الصبح بقريب). By addressing the rupture between religious and social sciences in Arab universities, this book provides a critical assessment of the curricula of Shariah and Islamic studies departments across the Arab world, by arguing for increased interdisciplinary dialogue. Based on over 250 interviews with university students and teachers, this study is the sum of five years of field research observing the curricula and teaching styles of colleges in the Shariah sciences. Hanafi provides critical insight into these curricula by focusing on case studies in Lebanon, Jordan, Morocco, Kuwait, Qatar, and Malaysia.

Hence, the book aims to answer the following questions:

- What is the purpose of religious education?
- Does it aim to create people who specialize solely in religious affairs, or does it aim to form the student according to a comprehensive human framework?
- What is the nature of the relationship between the social sciences and the Shariah sciences?

This book concludes by examining three pioneering institutions that have introduced alternative curricula in teaching Shariah studies. Furthermore, since the book has wide geographic and ideological coverage, it will appeal to university students, academics and policy analysts working across a range of disciplines, including the philosophy of knowledge, Islamic law and education, and sociology.

=== Knowledge Production in the Arab World: The Impossible Promise ===
Knowledge Production in the Arab World: The Impossible Promise. This 2023 Routledge co-authored book (with Rigas Aravanitis) demonstrates that there is a real crisis in the Arab world, not in term of knowledge production, but in the translation of knowledge into public awareness and policy. Therefore, Hanafi placed great importance on translating his publications into Arabic to reach local and Arab scholars and the public. In doing so, Hanafi remained connected with his international peers while simultaneously keeping his work locally relevant.

Similarly, in 2011, in his article University Systems in the Arab East: Publish Globally and Perish Locally vs Publish Locally and Perish Globally, Hanafi critiqued the manner in which a majority of Arab Eastern scholars fall into the trap of publishing globally and perishing locally, or publishing locally and perishing globally. Thus, Hanafi highlighted the need to link the gap between the two trends.

=== Against Symbolic Liberalism: A Plea for Dialogical Sociology ===
Finally, his forthcoming book Against Symbolic Liberalism: A Plea for Dialogical Sociology will be out in five languages: English, Arabic, Farsi, Chinese and Turkish. This global sociology book is a critical assessment of some major paradigms in the social sciences, particularly in sociology. This book is the outcome of many debates Hanafi carried out while serving the International Sociological Association (ISA), as a member of the executive committee, VP of National Associations and President of this association. Hanafi set in motion three directions for a global sociology; supplementing the postcolonial approach with an anti-authoritarian one, theorizing post-secular society and connecting sociology to moral philosophy.

== Sociological Approach ==
Predominantly ethnographic in nature, Sari Hanafi's research methodology involves participant observation techniques, qualitative interviews, and focus groups, in addition to quantitative research methods such as surveys and network analysis.

One aspect of Hanafi's sociological approach encompasses research on the Arab uprisings in the region since 2011 (see the special issue he co-edited about the Arab uprisings in International Sociology in 2015).

Being a member of the French, Lebanese, Syrian and Palestinian Sociological Associations, as well as different regional and international associations, and having published several works on the production of knowledge, Hanafi's work reflects the internationalization of sociology and its foundations in local contexts. Hanafi further articulated antagonistic binary categories such as tradition/modernity, East/West, universalism/contextualism, as he organized a large international conference of 55 participants under the title Sociologies in Dialogue (Fourth ISA Conference of the Council of National Associations). In this conference, Hanafi argued for the internationalization of sociology, while simultaneously emphasizing the significance of local contexts within the field. Sociologies in Dialogue touches upon inequalities, protecting sociologists from violations, challenging hierarchies, and establishing interconnections between research and society.

While Hanafi has found postcolonial theory useful in understanding our modernity, and especially knowledge production, his approach now is to criticize postcolonial studies as a discourse, specifically how it has been portrayed in the Arab region. More specifically, Hanafi shed light on postcolonial theory and its role in understanding modernity and the production of knowledge. For instance, in his article Post-Colonialism vs Post-Authoritarianism: The Arab World and Latin America in Comparative Perspective, Hanafi discussed the intersection between sociology and the post-colonial studies, and how such links has not been without its problems. Hanafi further discussed the growing crisis within several sectors of the Arab left and those who embrace post-colonialism as a singular perspective. Hence, he suggests that such a postcolonial approach, should be complimented by what he calls an anti-authoritarian approach.

Therefore, Hanafi constructed two directions for a global sociology: supplementing the postcolonial approach with an anti-authoritarian approach, and theorizing post-secular society. Hanafi further delved into the topic in his article Global Sociology – Toward New Directions, published in Current Sociology. Hanafi highlighted the need to address the rise of illiberal democracies by intertwining analysis on colonialism and authoritarianism, and forming an applicable framework for tackling such global issues.

=== Selected books ===
- S. Hanafi. Studying Islam in the Arab World: The Rupture Between Religion and the Social Sciences. London: Routledge. (2023).
- Armando Salvatore, Sari Hanafi and Kieko Obuse (Eds.) The Oxford Handbook of the Sociology of the Middle East. Oxford Univ. Press. (2022).
- Addressing the rupture between the religious and social sciences: Is the Dawn not Near?. Nohoudh Center for Studies and Research. (2021)
- Sari Hanafi and Chin-Chun Yi (Eds) Sociologies in Dialogue. London: Sage. (2020).
- Radwan al-Sayyid, Sari Hanafi, Bilal Orfali (eds.) Towards the Reconstruction of Islamic Studies. Beirut: Arab Scientific Publishers. (2019).
- Tarek Mitri and Sari Hanafi (eds.) The Strong and Weak Arab States in post Arab Uprisings. Beirut: Arab Scientific Publishers. (2019).(in Arabic).
- S. Hanafi and Rigas Arvanitis. Knowledge Production in the Arab World: The Impossible Promise. UK: Routledge. (2016).
- S. Hanafi, N. Ben Ghreit-Ramoun and M. Mustafa. (eds.) The Future of the Social Science in the Arab World. Beirut: CAUS. (in Arabic). (2014).
- S. Hanafi, Lex Takkenberg and Leila Hilal (Eds.).UNRWA and Palestinian Refugees: From Relief and Works to Human Development. Routledge. (2014).
- Are Knudsen and S. Hanafi (Eds.) Palestinian Refugees: Identity, Space and Place in the Levant. Routledge. (2010).
- S. Hanafi (Ed.). State of Exception and Resistance in The Arab World. Beirut: Center for Arab Unity Studies.(2010).(Arabic).
- Adi Ophir and Michal Givoni and S. Hanafi (Ed.) The Power of Inclusive Exclusion: Anatomy of Israeli Rule in the Occupied Palestinian Territories. New York: Zone Books. (2009).
- S. Hanafi (Ed.). Crossing borders, shifting boundaries: Palestinian Dilemmas. American University in Cairo Press.(2008).
- Eyal Benvenisti and Chaim Gans and S. Hanafi (Ed.) Israel and the Palestinian Refugees. Berlin: Springer and Max-Planck Institute. (2007).
- S. Hanafi and Linda Tabar. Donors, International organizations, local NGOs. Emergence of the Palestinian Globalized Elite. Washington: Institute of Palestine Studies and Ramallah: Muwatin. (2005).
- S. Ben néfissa, S. Hanafi, N. Abdel Fattah and C. Milani (Eds.) NGOs and Governance in the Arab World. Issues, Problems and Case Studies. Cairo: American University of Cairo Press. (2005).
- Sarah Bennéfissa and S. Hanafi (Eds.). Pouvoir et associations dans le monde arabe. Paris: CNRS. (2002).
- S. Hanafi. Hona wa honaq : nahwa tahlil lil ‘alaqa bin al-shatat al-falastini wa al markaz. (2001).
- S. Hanafi. Business Directory of Palestinian in the Diaspora.Jerusalem: Biladi,(In English, French and Arabic). (1998).

=== Selected Journal Articles ===
- Lila Abu-Lughod, Lisa Anderson*, Rabab El-Mahdi, Sari Hanafi, Stéphane LaCroix, Seteney Shami. Recapturing the Research Enterprise as a Collective Responsibility: The View from the Middle East & North Africa. Daedalus- Journal of the American Academy of Arts and Sciences (2025) 154 (2): .287–271
- Hanafi, S. (2025). Factoring religion in the time of symbolic liberalism: Some reflections on secularism and sexuality. Contributions to Indian Sociology, 58(2), 155–185.
- Hanafi, S. (2024). Societal Polarization and Academic Freedom in the Time of Symbolic Liberalism. Siyasat Arabiya. No 67. pp. 32–51.
- Alaa Khaled, Sari Hanafi. (2024). Beyond “Academia”: Disseminating Knowledge in the Arab World. Global Perspectives. 5 (1)
- Hanafi, S. (2023). Toward a dialogical sociology: Presidential address – XX ISA World Congress of Sociology 2023. International Sociology, 39(1), 3-26.
- Box-Steffensmeier, J.M., Burgess, J., Corbetta, M., Hanafi, S., et al. The Future of Human Behaviour research . Nature Human Behavior 6, 15–24 (2022).
- Hanafi, S. (2021). From Streamlining to Mainstreaming ‘Islamization of Knowledge’: The Case of the International Islamic University of Malaysia. American Journal of Islam and Society. 38: 1-2: 101–135.
- Hanafi, S. (2020). Renouer les fils rompus entre la sociologie et la philosophie morale dans un cadre post-séculier. Revue du Mauss. No 56. pp. 289–310.
- Hanafi, S., & Tomeh, A. (2019). Gender Equality in the Inheritance Debate in Tunisia and the Formation of the Non-Authoritarian Reasoning. Journal of Islamic Ethics. 3(1), pp. 207–232.
- Hanafi, S. (2019). Global Sociology revisited: Toward New Directions. Current Sociology. 68(1).pp. 3–21.
- Hanafi, S. (2019). We Speak the Truth!’: Knowledge and Politics in Friday’s Sermons in Lebanon. Contemporary Arab Affairs. 12:2, pp. 53–80.
- Alder, C. B., Arvanitis, R., Hanafi, S. (2017). Research in Arabic-speaking countries: Funding competitions, international collaboration, and career incentives. 45:1. 1–9.
- Hanafi, S. (2017). Gulf Response to the Syrian Refugee Crisis Facts, Debates and Fatwas . Sociology of Islam.
- Hanafi, S. (2016). Global Knowledge Production in the Social Sciences: a Critical Assessment. Sociologies in Dialogue. 2(1): 16–30.
- Hanafi, S., Knudsen, A., Flahive, R. (2016). Trial of the Status Quo: The Politics of Mediated Justice in the Special Tribunal for Lebanon. Arab Studies Journal. pp. 68–88.
- Bamyeh, M., Hanafi, S.(2015). Introduction to the special issue on Arab uprisings. International Sociology. 30(4):pp. 343–347.
- S. Hanafi and R, Arvanitis. (2014). The marginalization of the Arab language in social science: Structural constraints and dependency by choice. Current Sociology.
- Hanafi, S. (2013). Explaining spacio-cide in the Palestinian territory: Colonization, separation, andstate of exception. Current Sociology. 61(2) 190–205.
- Hanafi, S. (2013). Writing sociology in the Arab world: Knowledge Production Through Idafat, The Arab Journal of Sociology. Contemporary Arab Affairs. 6:2. pp. 220–236.
- Hanafi, S. (2011). University systems in the Arab East: Publish globally and perish locally vs publish locally and perish globally. Current Sociology. 59(3), 291–309.
- Hanafi, S. (2010). Framing Arab socio‐political space: state governmentality, governance and non‐institutional protestation. Contemporary Arab Affairs. 3(2). pp. 148–162.

== Position and membership in professional associations ==
- 2018— 2023: (President) International Sociological Association
- 2017— : (Member, International Advisory Council) World Congress for Middle Eastern Studies (WOCMES)
- 2017— : (Member) French Sociological Association
- 2016— : (Founding member and vice-president) Syrian Sociological Association.
- 2016— : (Board member) Palestinian Sociological and Anthropological Association.
- 2015—2017: (Vice president) Arab Council for the Social Sciences.
- 2014— (Vice president) International Sociological Association (ISA)
- 2013— (Advisory committee member) The Arab Social Science Monitor (ASSM), ACSS
- 2013— (Board member) Arab Council for the Social Sciences.
- 2011— (Member of the International Board of Consulting Editors) International Encyclopedia of the Social and Behavioral Sciences.
- 2010—2014: (Member of the executive committee) International Sociological Association (ISA)
- 2010—2012 : (Member of Comité de suivi) l' Institut français du Proche-Orient (IFPO)
- 2008—2016: (Member of the Executive Bureau) Arab Association of Sociology.
- 2005—: (Member) Lebanese Association of Sociology.
- 1994— : (Member) International Sociological Association.

== External links & References ==
- Sari Hanafi official website at the American University of Beirut
