= Refael Benvenisti =

Israeli economist

Refael (Rafi) Benvenisti

Refael (Rafi) Benvenisti (Hebrew: רפאל (רפי) בנבנשתי; born in 1937), an Israeli economist, was the co-chairman of Israel Palestine Center for Research and Information (IPCRI) for many years and is now a shareholder of the organization. IPCRI is dedicated to the resolution of the Israeli-Palestinian conflict on the basis of the "two-states for two peoples" solution.

== Biography ==
He was active in the economic development field in the international and local arenas. He was a Senior Adviser in the International Finance Corporation IFC in 1972 to 1975 and 1984 to 1989 and in this capacity was on the team that established the Facility for Investment Climate Advisory Services (FIAS) of the World Bank Group (FIAS). Later on in 1990 to 2004 he was a senior consultant to FIAS. In these capacities he worked in 40 countries advising governments on how to develop their private sectors and promote Foreign Direct Investment (FDI). In the landlocked African country of Lesotho he assisted in the establishment of an export oriented apparel manufacturing sector based on FDI. The development of this sector in Lesotho is considered a miracle by a World Bank - IFC report.

In 1976 to 1984 he was the executive director of the then Israel Investment Authority in charge of promoting foreign investment to Israel. In this capacity he assisted others in the take-off of the hi-tech industries and the establishment of the semiconductors industry in Israel (among them Intel and National Semiconductor).

In 1993 to 2000 he was the Senior Adviser to Shimon Peres and Avraham Shochat on Regional Cooperation Projects (see below the publications). In this capacity he was a member of the team that negotiated the Israel Jordan Peace Treaty and was the co-chairman of the teams that negotiated Article 20 Rift Valley and Article 23 Aqaba-Eilat. He was an active participant in the MENA summits in 1994 to 1997 and was a member of its steering committees. He promoted the introduction of new regional projects such as the new configuration of the Red Sea–Dead Sea Conduit (calling it the "Peace Conduit"), or as it is called the Two Seas Canal in 1998. and the Incense Route – Desert Cities in the Negev as a World Heritage-designated itinerary in the Negev in 2001. In 2007 he became a senior adviser to the Dead Sea Master Plan (Tama 13).

Benvenisti has a B.A. and M.A. degrees in Economics and Geography from the Hebrew University of Jerusalem and received a PhD degree in history, Economics and Geography from the Hebrew University of Jerusalem in July 2013. His dissertation is "Economic Institutions of the Old Assyrian Trade in the 20th to 18th Centuries B.C.". In 2016 he published a book "The Economy at the Dawn of History: Economic Institutions in Mesopotamia in the third and the Beginning of the Second Millennium B.C." Jerusalem, Magnes press (Hebrew, ISBN 978-965-493-862-4).

In 2024, he published a book “Economic Life at the Dawn of History: The Birth of Market Economy in the Third and Early Second Millennia BCE” DeGruyter, Berlin, ISBN 978-3-11-106510-6.

He is the son of Israel Prize recipient David Benvenisti and the brother of Meron Benvenisti the political analyst.

== Works ==
- "The Economy at the Dawn of History: Economic Institutions in Mesopotamia in the Third and the Beginning of the Second Millennium B.C." Magnes Press, Jerusalem, 2016. ISBN 978-965-493-862-4.
- “Economic Life at the Dawn of History: The Birth of Market Economy in the Third and Early Second Millennia BCE” DeGruyter, Berlin, 2024. ISBN 978-311-106-510-6.

Co-editor of

- "Development Options for Regional Cooperation" (1994).
- “Development Options for Cooperation: The Middle East/East Mediterranean Region" (1995).
- “Programs for Regional cooperation” (1997).
- “Partnerships in Development” (1998).
- "Regional Cooperation: Agriculture and Water Development Options" (1996).
- "Regional Environmental Cooperation and Development Options" (1996).

Benvenisti also participated in numerous reports on Private Sector Development, Foreign Direct Investment issues in developing countries and on Israeli issues such as:

- "Opportunities for Industrial Development in Botswana: An Economy in Transition" 1993
- "Kyrgyz Republic: Private Sector Review in the Transitional Era" 1999
- "Kazakhstan: Joint Private Sector Assessment" 2000
- "Site Visits by Potential Outside Investors" - Tomsk 2002
- "Marketing a Country"
- UNCTAD Investment Promotion Study 2001
- Akiva Eldar 'Haaretz': The Gaza – West Bank Safe Passage Committee (Chairman - Benvenisti)
- Jerusalem Post: The Red Sea-Dead Sea "Peace Conduit"
