= Meron Benvenisti =

Israeli political scientist and politician (1934–2020)

- מירון בנבנשתי

Deputy Mayor of Jerusalem
- In office 1971–1978
- Mayor: Teddy Kollek

Personal details
- Born: 21 June 1934 Jerusalem, Mandatory Palestine
- Died: 20 September 2020 (aged 86)
- Children: Eyal Benvenisti
- Parent: David Benvenisti
- Relatives: Refael (Rafi) Benvenisti (brother)
- Education: Hebrew University (BA); Harvard University (PhD)
- Occupation: Political scientist, urban planner, columnist

Meron Benvenisti (Hebrew: מירון בנבנשתי; 21 April 1934 – 20 September 2020) was an Israeli political scientist who was deputy mayor of Jerusalem under Teddy Kollek from 1971 to 1978, during which he administered Israeli-occupied East Jerusalem and served as Jerusalem's chief planning officer. He supported a binational Israeli–Palestinian state.

== Early life ==
Benvenisti was born in 1934 in Jerusalem. His father was David Benvenisti, a Greek Jew originally from Thessaloniki and recipient of the Israel Prize, while his mother Leah (née Friedman) was Lithuanian Jewish. He was the brother of Refael (Rafi) Benvenisti, and father of Eyal Benvenisti. He graduated from the Leyada and served his compulsory military service in a Nahal unit near the Israeli–Lebanese border at Kibbutz Gesher HaZiv.

In the early 1950s, following his discharge, Benvenisti moved to the nearby Kibbutz Rosh Hanikra and served as a youth movement leader. He enrolled at the Hebrew University after his return to Jerusalem in 1955, studying both economics and medieval history. He later published books and maps on the period of the Crusaders in the Holy Land. During his years as a student, he headed the Hebrew University student union and the National Union of Israeli Students. He later obtained a doctorate from Harvard University's Kennedy School for his work on conflict management in Jerusalem and in Belfast.

== Career ==
In 1984, Benvenisti founded the West Bank Database Project, documenting social, economic, and political developments in the West Bank. Since 1992 he devoted his time to teaching as visiting lecturer (at Ben-Gurion University in 1994–1998 and Johns Hopkins University's School of Advanced International Studies (SAIS) in 1982–2009), research and writing on Jerusalem, the Northern Ireland conflict, Israeli–Palestinian relations, the Palestinian vanished landscape and bi-nationalism. He was a fellow at the Wilson Center in Washington, D.C. and a visiting fellow at Harvard's Center for International Affairs (CFIA) and a recipient of research grants from the Rockefeller Foundation, the Ford Foundation and the United States Institute of Peace. Between 1991 and 2009, he wrote a column for the newspaper Haaretz.

== Political views ==
Benvenisti was a critic of Israel's policies towards Palestinians in the West Bank and Gaza Strip and was an advocate of the idea of a binational state. In 2004, he warned that plans to build a separation wall were actually plans for "bantustans" which would effectively imprison millions of Palestinians and exacerbate the conflict, rather than resolve it as many hoped. He said that "the day will come when believers in this illusion will realise that 'separation' is a means to oppress and dominate, and then they will mobilise to dismantle the apartheid apparatus."

In 2012, Benvenisti opined that claims that Israel is an apartheid state were "wrongheaded, simplistic and dangerous", but also said that the situation in Israel proper was "no less grave". He argued that Israel had become a "Herrenvolk democracy" (master race democracy) in which Israel behaves "like a full-blooded democracy" but has a group of serfs (the Arabs) for whom democracy is suspended, creating a situation of "extreme inequality". In the same interview, he stated that "The separation fence: that is truly apartheid. Separation is apartheid." According to Benvenisti, the only solution is to incorporate Palestinians into the state on conditions of equality.

His experience led him in later years to be disillusioned with Zionism, stating in a 2012 interview with journalist Ari Shavit:

I went to Kibbutz Hanikra in the 1950s and experienced the transcendent feeling of working in the banana groves without noticing that in order to plant the banana trees, I was uprooting olive trees, thousands of years old, of a Palestinian village. During that whole period ... I did not understand the meaning of what I was doing. But when I started to deal with the Arabs of East Jerusalem, I began to understand. I saw that the problem is not only the individual rights of the Palestinians but also their collective rights.

According to American political scientist Ian Lustick, Benvenisti will be remembered primarily as a prophet of a future one-state solution: "He will be remembered primarily as a prophet — a tormented, hyperbolic, anguished, but, in the end, undeniably accurate prophet. Prophets only need to be right about some things to be remembered for their prophecy. Meron was right about one big thing: that the future of Palestine, the future of the Land of Israel, will grow out of a one-state reality from the river to the sea — a reality he identified as such earlier than almost any Jewish Israeli."

== Death ==
On 20 September 2020, Benvenisti died of renal failure at the age of 86.

== Publications ==
=== Books (partial) ===
- Benvenisti, Meron (1976). The Crusaders in the Holy Land. Jerusalem: Israel Universities Press. OCLC 1004860416
- Benvenisti, Meron (1976): Jerusalem, the Torn City, University of Minnesota Press, Minneapolis, ISBN 0-8166-0795-8
- Benvenisti, Meron (1984): West Bank Data Project: A Survey of Israel's Policies, American Enterprise Institute for Public Policy Research, ISBN 0-8447-3544-2
- Benvenisti, Meron (1988): Conflicts and Contradictions, Villard, ISBN 0-394-53647-9
- Benvenisti, Meron (1995): Intimate Enemies: Jews and Arabs in a Shared Land. University of California Press ISBN 0-520-08567-1
- Benvenisti, Meron (1996): City of Stone: The Hidden History of Jerusalem. University of California Press ISBN 0-520-20521-9
- Benvenisti, Meron (2002): Sacred Landscape: Buried History of the Holy Land Since 1948. University of California Press. ISBN 0-520-23422-7
- Benvenisti, Meron (2007): Sons of the Cypresses: Memories, Reflections and Regrets from a Political Life. University of California Press ISBN 978-0-5202-3825-1
- Benvenisti, Meron (2012), The Dream of the White Sabra ISBN 978-9-6507-2031-5 (Hebrew)

=== Articles (partial) ===
- Meron Benvenisti (3 January 2002). "Either a Zionist or a terrorist". Haaretz. Archived from the original on 22 May 2011.
- Meron Benvenisti (17 January 2002). "Systematically burying ourselves". Haaretz. Archived from the original on 22 May 2011.
- Meron Benvenisti (26 September 2002). "The homeland purified of Arabs". Haaretz. Archived from the original on 28 June 2010. (about Sataf)
- Meron Benvenisti (10 October 2002). "Loving 'the homeland'". Haaretz. Archived from the original on 22 May 2011.
- Meron Benvenisti (7 November 2002). "The binational option". Haaretz. Archived from the original on 22 May 2011.
- Meron Benvenisti (21 November 2002). "The never-ending enterprise". Haaretz. Archived from the original on 22 January 2014.
- Meron Benvenisti (19 December 2002). "A tank under the Christmas tree". Haaretz. Archived from the original on 22 May 2011.
- Meron Benvenisti (13 March 2003). "Prime minister of what?". Haaretz. Archived from the original on 22 May 2011.
- Meron Benvenisti (10 April 2003). "The true test of the imperial pretension". Haaretz. Archived from the original on 22 May 2011.
- Meron Benvenisti (24 April 2003). "The capital nobody wants to lead". Haaretz. Archived from the original on 22 May 2011.
- Meron Benvenisti (3 July 2003). "The High Court and fear of return". Haaretz. Archived from the original on 22 May 2011. (about Ikrit)
- Meron Benvenisti (31 July 2003). "When will Israel become a homeland?". Haaretz. Archived from the original on 22 May 2011.
- Meron Benvenisti (8 August 2003). "Cry, the beloved two-state solution (Part 2)". Haaretz. Archived from the original on 10 March 2008.
- Meron Benvenisti (28 August 2003). "A wall against fear". Haaretz. Archived from the original on 22 May 2011.
- Meron Benvenisti (6 November 2003). "Defensive walls of self-righteousness". Haaretz. Archived from the original on 22 May 2011.
- Meron Benvenisti (20 November 2003). "Which kind of binational state?". Haaretz. Archived from the original on 28 September 2010.
- Meron Benvenisti (26 April 2004). "Bantustan plan for an apartheid Israel". The Guardian.
- Meron Benvenisti (9 February 2006). "The hypocrisy of tolerance". Haaretz. Archived from the original on 22 May 2011.
- Meron Benvenisti (29 May 2008). "A lull of no return". Haaretz. Archived from the original on 6 August 2011. (on the possible/probable de facto long-term political division between Gaza and the West Bank and its effects on both Israel and the Palestinians)
