= Hasdai =

Hasdai is a given name. Notable people with the name include:

- Hasdai ben Hezekiah, son of Hezekiah ben Solomon, thus the 9th Karaite exilarch of the line of Anan ben David
- Hasdai Crescas (born c. 1340; died 1410/11), Jewish philosopher and halakhist (teacher of Jewish law)
- Hasdai ibn Shaprut (born c. 915; died 970 or 990), Jewish physician, diplomat, and patron of science
- Solomon ben Hasdai, the son of Hasdai ben Hezekiah
