= Vidal Benveniste =

Don Vidal Benveniste de la Cavalleria was a Spanish Jew who lived in Zaragoza, Spain, during the second half of the 14th and beginning of the 15th century. He was elected, by the notables of the Jewish communities of Aragon, as the speaker before the pope at the beginning of disputation of Tortosa (1413), because of his knowledge of Latin and his reputed wisdom.

Benveniste wrote a refutation of the seeming evidences of Jesus as the Messiah, called "Ḳodesh ha-Ḳodashim," which is still extant in manuscript. He is not identical with Don Ferrer of Gerona or with Vidal ben Labi de la Cavalleria, as claimed by some.
