= Kira (title) =

Title in the Ottoman court

Kira, kyra, kiera or chiera (all are Greek for "lady") was a common title for the women (usually Jewish women, but also Christians), who acted as agents for the women of the Ottoman sultan's Imperial Harem.

== History ==
=== Context and background ===
The method of using non-Muslim women as intermediaries between men and Muslim businesswomen was a common phenomenon in all classes in the Ottoman Empire. Muslim women were provided formal control of their own money, and thus theoretically allowed to participate in business. However, in practice their participation in business was hampered by the fact that it was not seen as respectable for women to come in contact with men outside of the family. The gender segregation of Muslim women provided a valuable business opportunity for both Jewish and Christian women, who are known to have functioned as intermediaries and go-between for Muslim women, selling the handiwork of Muslim women on the market place and to (male) merchants. The French traveler Pierre Belon noted this phenomenon in the 16th century and reported that:

Jewish women who could go around with their faces uncovered are commonly found in the Turkish markets selling needlework. Since Islamic law does not allow Turkish women to sell and buy, they sold their [products] to Jewish women. ... They [the Jewish women] ordinarily sold towels, kerchiefs, headgear, white belts, cushion covers, and other such products of much greater value ... that the Jews bought to sell to strangers.

The kiras of the Imperial harem were simply the most prominent of these non-Muslim go-betweens.

The gender segregation was more strict the higher class a woman had. Due to the restrictions of the customary gender segregation which was imposed upon the women of the harem, they could seldom leave the harem, and their contact with the outside world normally had to take place through an intermediary. Because they generally could not have contact with men, it was difficult for them to conduct their business, as merchants and businesspeople were generally men. The intermediary therefore had to be a female (or sometimes a eunuch). The ideal intermediary was a non-Muslim woman, who could pass freely in and out of the harem, as well as interact more freely with businessmen herself. This eventually resulted in the phenomena of the kira.

=== Function ===
The often Jewish male merchants who sold clothing, jewels and luxury goods to the women of the imperial harem could not be admitted themselves to the harem to show their products because their ender, so a custom developed in which their goods were displayed by their wives. This position of intermediary could be very lucrative for a merchant's wife in that situation. She could win the confidence of the women of the harem, and eventually be asked to perform other tasks as well for the harem women, such as acting as secretaries, handling their correspondence, acquiring medicines and performing medical treatments, and various business tasks for them, acting as their economic agents. This was particularly the case for educated Jewish elite women from Spain and Italy, who were literate and more educated than the harem women, who were often slaves. Many kiras continued their activity when they became widows, and thus earned a personal income. It is unconfirmed whether kira was a formal position in the Ottoman court, or whether it was simply an informal phenomenon.

Some kiras became famous as influential favorites. The most famous kiras were Strongilah, Esther Handali and Esperanza Malchi, but there were likely kiras whose name was not preserved. In 1622, an unnamed Jewish woman, possibly a Kira to a sister of Sultan Osman II (r. 1618–1622), is noted to have promoted a candidate to the office of governor of Moldavia by the name of Locadello; and in 1709, another female intermediary, possibly a Kira to the mother of Sultan Ahmed III (r. 1703–1730), is noted to have assisted the Jewish physician Daniel de Fonseca in passing information to the sultan's mother regarding to the Ottoman-Swedish alliance against Russia.

== See also ==
- Qahramāna, equivalent in earlier Islamic history
- Beatrice Michiel
- Chirana
