= David Benvenisti =

Israeli geographer and educator

- דוד בנבנשתי
- Born: 25 January 1897; Thessaloniki, Ottoman Empire
- Died: 16 May 1993 (aged 96); Jerusalem, Israel
- Education: Hebrew University of Jerusalem
- Occupations: Geographer, Educator
- Known for: Geography of Israel, education
- Spouse: Leah Friedman
- Children: Meron Benvenisti; Refael (Rafi) Benvenisti
- Relatives: Eyal Benvenisti (grandson)
- Awards: Israel Prize (1982); Yakir Yerushalayim (1969)

David Benvenisti (Hebrew: דוד בנבנשתי; January 25, 1897, in Thessaloniki – May 16, 1993, in Jerusalem), a descendant of well-known rabbis in Thessaloniki, was a geographer and educator; he received the 'Israel Prize' of 1982 for his life achievements in education and geography of Israel, and the Yakir Yerushalayim in 1969.

Benvenisti was married to Leah Friedman from Suwałki, Poland. His sons are: Meron Benvenisti, a historian and writer who was the deputy mayor of Jerusalem for many years; and Refael (Rafi) Benvenisti, an economist and historian. His grandson is Eyal Benvenisti, a professor of law at Cambridge University.

== Biography ==
David Benvenisti's grandfather Shmuel Yosef was the Chief Justice of the Jewish Court in Thessaloniki. In 1913, he immigrated to Palestine, then part of the Ottoman Empire, to pursue rabbinical studies in Jerusalem. In 1918, on completing his studies at the Hebrew Teachers' College of Jerusalem, he enlisted in the British Army's Hebrew Battalion. He served with the battalion until 1920.

In the 1930s he and his colleagues established what is now known as Israel Youth Hostel Association. In 1935, he received an M.A. degree in Geography from the Hebrew University of Jerusalem. In 1948, he fought with the Haganah and was wounded in the battle for Jerusalem.

== Pedagogic and public career ==
He was a teacher and a principal of an elementary school in Beit Hakerem in Jerusalem for more than 40 years. During his tenure, he refused to leave his pupils for higher positions. He established with friends in 1927 the first 'Palestine Hikers Association' that organized hiking and car tours of Palestine and the Middle East. After retirement from teaching he became in 1964 the first director general of the Ben Zvi Institute for the study of Jewish communities in the East' in Jerusalem and the chairman of the Committee for Naming Roads and Streets of Jerusalem.

== Literary career ==
Benvenisti wrote many textbooks on the geography of Israel and published one of the first guide books of Palestine after the First World War. He also edited books and wrote articles on the history of the Jewish Community of Thessaloniki. His memoirs describe his childhood in Thessaloniki, service in the Jewish Legion in the First World War, and years as a teacher and school principal.
