= Benveniste de Porta =

Vidal Benveniste de Porta (Catalan: Vidal Benvenist ça Porta; died 1268) was the Jewish batlle of Barcelona, Girona and Leida and a brother of Nahmanides.

Benveniste was an important official of Barcelona and the tax collector and treasurer (bailiff) of King Jaume I of Aragon. From time to time he advanced to the king payments on the municipal dues owed to the king. Thus on 17 December 1257, he advanced 3,863 sous on the dues of his bailiwick; and on the 15th of the following month he received the right to sell the tax collection of Barcelona and Girona for two years. The total advances to the king was no less than 199,483 sous, which Benveniste was allowed to recover by giving to him the tax collection from Lleida and other places of his bailiwick. Part of the payment for the tax advances was made by the Jews of Barcelona who were ordered to hand over (taxes of) 12,000 sous to Benveniste.

Meanwhile, the king continued his orders to Benveniste for the advancement of funds, drawing a check on him for 5,000 sous on June 12, 1260; while two years later the king acknowledged his indebtedness of 15,221 sous for payment made on account of the Infanta Donna Joanna, on May 21, 1262. In return for the advance, the dues of Vilafranca (ib. No. 205), as well as twenty squares of land there, and the taxes of the Balearic Islands and of Perpinyà, were granted to Benveniste. The latter continued to act as the bailiff for the king, since a record is found of acknowledgment of an advancement of 15,000 sous, paid by Benveniste to the bishop of Barcelona when proceeding on an embassy to France on 1 January 1254; and as late as 1 February 1268, the tax collection from the Jews of Girona were assigned to Benveniste.

Altogether Benveniste stood high in favor with the king and when on May 29, 1264, his brother Nahmanides was pardoned, two-thirds of the fine he had incurred for the alleged crime of vituperating Jesus in the celebrated disputation of 1263 was remitted, the king expressly stating that the pardon was given "amore Benveniste de Porta, fratris tui".
