= Joseph Nasi =

Ottoman Jewish statesman and financier (1524–1579)

- יוֹסֵף נָשִׂיא
- Born: 1524; Portugal
- Died: 1579 (aged 54–55); Constantinople, Ottoman Empire
- Resting place: Unknown
- Other name: João Miques
- Occupations: Ottoman statesman and diplomat
- Known for: Being an influential figure in Ottoman Empire politics
- Title: Lord of Tiberias (1561 - 1579); Duke of Naxos (1566 - 1579)
- Spouse: (Reyna) Ana Nasi (m. ? - 1579)
- Relatives: Gracia Mendes Nasi (aunt); (Reyna) Ana Nasi (cousin)

Joseph Nasi (1524 – 1579), known in Portuguese as João Miques, was a Portuguese Sephardi diplomat and administrator, member of the House of Mendes and House of Benveniste, nephew of Doña Gracia Mendes Nasi, and an influential figure in the Ottoman Empire during the rules of both Sultan Suleiman I and his son Selim II.

A court Jew, he was appointed lord of Tiberias, with the expressed aim of resettling Jews in Palestine (then Ottoman Syria) and encouraging industry there; the attempt failed, and, later, he was appointed Duke of Naxos. Nasi also supported a war with the Republic of Venice, at the end of which Venice lost the island of Cyprus to the Ottomans. After the death of Selim, he lost influence in the Ottoman Court, but was allowed to keep his titles and pension for the remainder of his life.

== Etymology ==
Also known as João Miques/Micas and Dom João Migas Mendes in a Portuguese variant, Giuseppe Nasi in Italian, and Yasef Nassi in Ottoman Turkish.

== Biography ==
Joseph Nasi was born in Portugal as a marrano (practicing Judaism in secret), a son of the doctor Agostinho Micas (d. 1525), a well-known physician and professor at the University of Lisbon. A friend of Maximilian, nephew of the Habsburg king Charles I of Spain. He escaped to Portugal after Charles decided to confiscate the Mendes fortune, and, after the Holy Inquisition began operating against Portuguese Marranos in 1546, moved to Antwerp, in the Habsburg Netherlands, with his aunt, Doña Gracia Mendes Nasi, whose daughter Ana he later married. He studied at the University of Louvain, but had to flee the Inquisition in 1547. He then moved to France and later to Venice, before finally leaving for the Ottoman realm in 1554, where he married his cousin Brianda (Reyna) Mendes (the daughter Ana of Gracia Mendes Nasi).

== Business and diplomatic career ==
When he arrived in Constantinople together with his aunt Gracia Mendes Nasi, Nasi made a fortunate decision in supporting the future sultan Selim II, against his rival Bayezid; as a result, he was favored by the Seraglio, and eventually became a high-ranking diplomat and minister.

Due to his trading connections in Europe, he was able to exercise great influence on Ottoman foreign policy. Among his achievements were negotiating peace with Poland and influencing the new election of the Polish king. He was awarded the monopoly of the beeswax trade with Poland, and of the wine trade with Moldavia, and maneuvered in the latter country to keep princes favorable to his policies in power. In 1561, Nasi backed Ioan Iacob Heraclid to rule as despot, supported Alexandru Lăpușneanu's return to the throne in place of Ștefan Tomșa (1564), and ultimately endorsed Ion Vodă cel Cumplit (1572); he was himself considered a suitable choice for hospodar of either Moldavia or Wallachia in 1571, but Selim II rejected the proposal.

During the war between the Ottomans and the Republic of Venice, Nasi's negotiations with the Jewish community in Venetian-ruled Cyprus were uncovered, and, as a result, the Jewish population of Famagusta (with the exception of Jews who were natives of the city) was expelled in June, 1568 (see History of the Jews in Cyprus). It is believed that he intended parts of Cyprus to be a Jewish colony and encouraged the Ottoman annexation of Cyprus in the war to that end; he was granted a coat of arms by Selim that indicated he would be given viceregal rank in that colony. Nasi's relative Abraham Benveniste (Abraham Bene, Righetto Marrano) was arrested in 1570, on charges of having set fire to the Venetian Arsenal on Nasi's instigation.

Maintaining contacts with William the Silent, Nasi encouraged the Netherlands to revolt against Spain, a major adversary of the Ottoman Empire (the rebellion was ultimately carried out by the Union of Utrecht, as the start of the Eighty Years' War). For this and other achievements, he was appointed by Selim to become the Duke of Naxos. Represented locally by one Francesco Coronello, Nasi mainly ruled the Duchy from his palace of Belvedere near Constantinople, where he also maintained his own Hebrew printing press, founded by his aunt, Gracia Mendes Nasi, which was kept by his wife, Doña Reyna, after Joseph's death.

== Jewish settlement in Tiberias and Safed ==
Nasi is best known for his attempt to resettle the towns of Tiberias and Safed in 1561. He was the first person in modernity to attempt to settle Jews in the cities of what was then Ottoman Syria by practical means, as opposed to waiting for the Messiah. The efforts were financed together with his aunt, Dona Gracia Mendes Nasi.

Nasi secured a grant giving ruling authority from the Sultan, and, with the assistance of Joseph ben Adruth, rebuilt the walls and the town. He also attempted to turn it into a textile (silk) center by planting mulberry trees and encouraging craftsmen to move there. Arrangements were made for Jews to move from the Papal States, but, when the Ottomans and the Republic of Venice went to war, the plan was abandoned.

After Nasi's death, the lease of Tiberias was given to Solomon Ibn-Yaish (Alvaro Mendes).
