= Sheshet Benveniste =

Provençal Jewish physician and writer (f. 12th century)

Sheshet ben Isaac ben Joseph Benveniste (lived in the latter half of the 12th century) was a Provençal Jewish physician and writer. Like Isaac Benveniste, who is supposed to have been his father, he was styled "Nasi" (prince). According to one source Al-Harizi called him the "pillar of the world and the foundation-stone of all pietists".

== Biography ==
He received his education at Narbonne, his probable birthplace; afterward he lived at Barcelona, and later at Zaragoza, in which city he died about 1209. It is said that he owed his high position to his knowledge of Arabic. He practised medicine, and was the author of a medical work, manuscript copies of which are still extant at Oxford and Munich.

Such was his reputation as a physician that patients came long distances to consult him, and some are said to have journeyed even from Mainz (e.g., Solomon ben Hananel). Benveniste, whose generosity is praised by Al-Ḥarizi, was poetically gifted and composed several liturgical songs. Even in his old age he remained a friend of free investigation, as the following epigram on Meïr Abulafia shows:

You ask why 'lustrous' he is named,
Though he the light so cheaply rated;
Because the dusk we 'twilight' name:
By language-contrasts thoughts are mated.

Benveniste directed a letter to the congregation of Lunel, in answer to the epistle of Abulafia to that congregation, in which he freely expresses himself upon the value of Maimonides's "Yad ha-Ḥazaḳah," because it enabled the laity to control the judgments rendered by the Rabbis. He carried on a lively correspondence with Nasi Kalonymus ben Ṭodros and with Levi ben Moses of Narbonne, where his brother Joseph also resided. He lost his three sons in their prime.

He was also known in his day as the "elder-prophet", a man "on whom the spirit of the Lord dwelt". In one of his poems he describes a vision that came to him in a dream: "I saw an angel standing before me; his spirit came to me and I began to prophesy: Oh, you who seek visions, listen to my words--the Lord, who has embittered my soul, is now good to me; He has said that He will answer me in my time of trouble."
