= Esperanza Malchi =

Jewish Ottoman businesswoman

- Born: Italy
- Died: 1 April 1600; Constantinople, Ottoman Empire
- Cause of death: assassination
- Occupation: Kira
- Children: At least three sons

Esperanza Malchi also spelled Malk or Malkhi (died 1 April 1600) was a Jewish Ottoman businesswoman. She was the influential favorite and Kira (business agent) of the valide sultan Safiye Sultan.

== Life ==
=== Early life ===
Malchi reportedly originated from Italy, though details about her early life are unknown. She was married to a Jewish businessman and had at least three sons.

Due to the seclusion from the opposite sex and the outside world imposed upon the women of the Ottoman Imperial Harem, male merchants were not allowed into the harem, and a custom developed with merchants' wives entering the harem to act as intermediary agents, displaying the goods to the prospective clients of the harem. These women were often Jews, who, as non-Muslims, were not subjected to the same gender segregation as Muslim women, and thus could act as the intermediaries of the harem women in several other areas. Many became successful businesswomen as agents to the harem women, particularly as widows. This would have been the background of Malchi as well.

Because several kiras were working in the Imperial Harem in parallel and are seldom documented by name, it is difficult to identify individual kiras and separate them from each other. Malchi, in particular, has often been confused with Esther Handali, who had a similar position and was active simultaneously. When she first entered the harem is unknown, but her career overlaps with Esther Handali's, who was employed by Nurbanu Sultan, the mother of Sultan Murad III. Malchi, however, worked for Nurbanu Sultan's daughter-in-law, Safiye, consort of Murad III and mother of Sultan Mehmed III.

=== Kira of Safiye Sultan ===
Malchi had the same favored position to Safiye Sultan, as Esther Handali had previously had to Nurbanu Sultan. As was common for a kira, she became the trusted confidant of her client, and her tasks soon expanded from acting as intermediary for merchant goods to acting as intermediary for other money transactions, and from there to further tasks between her client and the outside world. When Safiye became the valide sultan, mother and adviser of the reigning sultan (1595-1603), Handali's own influence reached its peak, and she was entrusted with political and diplomatic correspondence between Safiye and foreign powers. In the case of Malchi, her position of favourite to Safiye Sultan was rumoured to be the result of a love affair between the two women, a rumour which was described by the English ambassador at the Ottoman court.

Reportedly, she attempted to influence Safiye (and through her the sultan) to a policy against the Republic of Venice, and by doing so came in conflict with the Venetian spy Beatrice Michiel, who had the opposite intention: the two women once came in to open conflict in front of Safiye. She acted as the intermediary between Safiye and the Queen of England, and wrote to Queen Elizabeth I of England on her mistress' behalf, mentioning discreet exchanges of diplomatic items.

=== Death ===
The position of Malchi became a cause of widespread discontent. Her influence upon the sultan's mother and through her upon the sultan himself and the policy of the Ottoman Empire was resented, as well as her influential role in the economic affairs of the court. In the spring of 1600, the Ottoman cavalry revolted because of the devaluation of the currency. Malchi became the target of their discontent, and the rebels successfully demanded of the sultan that he turn Malchi over to them. On 1 April, Malchi and her eldest son were assassinated near the house of Halil Pasha, the Kaymakam of Constantinople. Her second son escaped while her youngest son converted to Islam. Her assassination was seen as a hard blow to the Jewish community of Constantinople.
