= Esther Handali =

Ottoman-Jewish businesswoman

- Born: Jerez de la Frontera, Spain
- Died: 18/19 December 1588; Ottoman Empire
- Occupation: Kira
- Spouse: Eliya Handali

Esther Handali (died 18 or 19 December 1588 ) was a Jewish Ottoman businesswoman. She was the influential favorite and Kira (business agent) of Nurbanu Sultan, Safiye Sultan, and possibly of Hürrem Sultan.

== Life ==
=== Early life ===
Esther Handali was reportedly a Sephardic Jew from Jerez de la Frontera in Spain.

She was married to the Jewish merchant Eliya Handali, who traded in luxuries such as jewellery, expensive clothing and cosmetics to the women of the Imperial Harem. Due to the seclusion from the opposite sex and the outside world imposed upon the women of the harem, male merchants were not allowed in to the harem, and a custom developed with merchant wives entering the harem to act as intermediary agents, displaying the goods to the prospective clients of the harem. These women were often Jews, who as non-Muslims were not subjected to the same gender segregation as Muslim women, and thus could act as the intermediaries of the harem women in several other areas. Esther Handali acted as the agent of her spouse in his business with the harem, and when she was widowed, she took over his business.

Due to the fact that there were several kiras simultaneously working in the Imperial Harem, and that they are seldom documented by name (the different kiras are normally referred to only as kira, kyra, or Kyra Jewess), it is difficult to identify individual kiras and separate them from each other. Esther Handali, in particular, has often been confused with Esperanza Malchi. When she first entered the harem is unknown, but she may have been the same unidentified kira who is noted to have performed secretarial tasks for Hürrem Sultan, and has been mentioned in connection to Mihrimah Sultan (although Strongilah could also have been this kira). She was thus active in the end or not long after the career of Strongilah, while Esperanza Malchi would have arrived somewhat later, though their careers overlap.

=== Kira of Nurbanu Sultan ===
What is clearly confirmed is that Esther Handali was the kira of Nurbanu Sultan from at least 1566 onward, when Nurbanu became the favoured consort of the reigning sultan. As was common for a kira, she became the trusted confidant of her client, and her tasks soon expanded from acting as intermediary for merchant goods to acting as intermediary for other money transactions, and from there to further tasks between her client and the outside world.

When Nurbanu became the valide sultan, mother and adviser of the reigning sultan (1574-1583), Handali's own influence reached its peak, and she was entrusted with political and diplomatic correspondence between Nurbanu and foreign powers. She acted as the intermediary between Nurbanu and Catherine de' Medici.

Nurbanu Sultan was particularly sympathetic toward a pro-Venetian policy, and Esther Handali acted as the intermediary in the contact between the Republic of Venice and Nurbanu Sultan, which was conducted between the Venetian ambassador and Nurbanu with Handali as messenger from 1578 onward. She continued as the intermediary between Venice and the Imperial Harem from 1578 until 1588, after the death of Nurbanu in 1583, and her connection to Venice appears to have been used also by Nurbanu's successor, Safiye Sultan. As a reward for her service, the Republic of Venice granted Esther Handali a letter of approval to start a lottery in the Venetian Republic in 1587, which had never before been granted to a foreigner.

Due to her position, Esther Handali earned an enormous fortune. She became known as the benefactor of the Jewish community in Istanbul, especially for widows and orphans, and became particularly remembered for her relief help to the victims and homeless after the great fire of 1569.

== Portrayal in popular culture ==
- Possibly the inspiration for the character Esther in Orhan Pamuk's novel My Name is Red.
- The main character of Solmaz Kamuran's 2011 novel Kiraze.
