= Danone =

French multinational food corporation

Danone S.A.
- Formerly: Boussois-Souchon-Neuvesel (1966–1967); BSN (1967–1973); BSN-Gervais Danone (1973–1983); BSN Groupe (1983–1994)
- Type: Public company
- Traded as: Euronext Paris: BN; CAC 40 component
- ISIN: FR0000120644
- Industry: Food processing
- Founded: Company: 1966; 60 years ago (as Boussois-Souchon-Neuvesel); Brand: 1919; 107 years ago
- Founder: Isaac Carasso
- Headquarters: Rue La Fayette; 9th arrondissement, Paris, France
- Area served: Worldwide
- Key people: Franck Riboud (honorary chairman); Gilles Schnepp (chair); Antoine Bernard de Saint-Affrique (CEO)
- Products: Baby food; coffee; dairy products; dairy-free products; bottled water; dietary supplements; protein supplements
- Brands: Main brands
- Revenue: ▲€27,283 billion (2025)
- Operating income: ▲€3.665 billion (2025)
- Net income: ▲€2.461 billion (2025)
- Number of employees: 90,000 (2025)
- Website: danone.com

Danone (French pronunciation: [danɔn]) is a French multinational food-products corporation based in Paris. It was founded in 1919 in Barcelona, Spain. It is listed on Euronext Paris, where it is a component of the CAC 40 stock market index. In 2020, Danone became the first listed company to adopt the status of société à mission, as introduced by France's PACTE law of 2019.

Danone was formed through the 1973 merger of two French groups: Gervais Danone and Boussois-Souchon-Neuvesel (BSN). Gervais Danone itself resulted from the 1967 merger of Danone—founded by Isaac Carasso in Barcelona, Spain, in 1919—and Gervais. BSN was created in 1966 through the merger of the glass manufacturer Boussois and the glassworks company Souchon-Neuvesel. In 1994, the group adopted the name of its flagship fresh dairy brand, Danone. Under the leadership of Antoine Riboud, the company had become France's largest food manufacturer and the third-largest food group in Europe.

Over time the company organized its activities around three main business segments: fresh dairy and plant-based products, bottled water, and specialized nutrition, including medical and infant nutrition. Present in more than 120 markets in 2025, Danone reported sales of €27.283 billion, making it the world's tenth-largest food company. The group employs approximately 90,000 people worldwide across more than 180 production sites.

In 2025 dairy and plant-based products represented 48% of total group sales; specialized nutrition (medical and infant), 34%; and water, 18%. Danone is the 4th largest dairy processing company globally, behind Nestlé, Dairy Farmers of America, and Lactalis.

== History ==
=== Birth of Danone and creation of Gervais Danone (1919–1969) ===
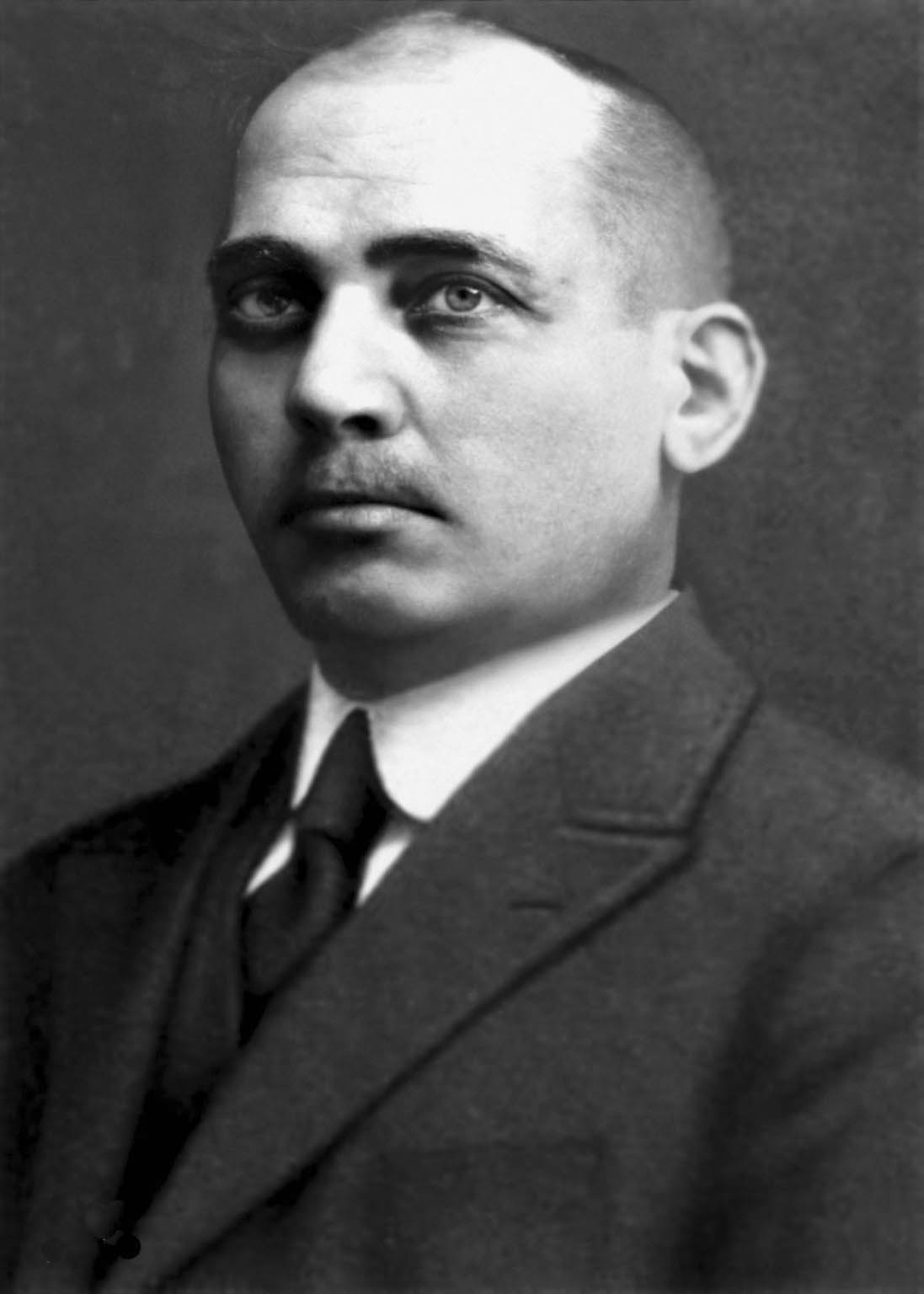
Isaac Carasso, founder of Danone

At the end of World War I in Europe, many children suffered from intestinal disorders linked to poor hygiene conditions. Isaac Carasso, a merchant, took an interest in the research of Élie Metchnikoff, a researcher at the Pasteur Institute and Nobel laureate in 1908. This research focused on the benefits of yoghurts and lactic ferments on health, highlighting in particular their use in treating intestinal disorders. Isaac Carasso was already familiar with the virtues of : in Thessaloniki, where he was from, the product was widely available and sold in the streets by the kilogram. He decided to introduce it in Spain, incorporating lactic cultures on the advice of doctors. The Pasteur Institute supplied the cultures.

In 1919 in a small workshop in Barcelona, Isaac Carasso launched yoghurt production. The yoghurts were made with fresh milk and delivered the following day. The brand was initially called "Danon", after the Catalan nickname of his son "petit Daniel". However, a proper name could not serve as a trade name under Spanish law. The founder added an "e" to register the brand, which became "Danone". In 1923, the Barcelona College of Physicians officially recognized the properties of yoghurt. The pots were sold in pharmacies on doctors' recommendations, and later in dairy shops.

After commercial studies in Marseille and a bacteriology placement at the Institut Pasteur, Daniel Carasso, then aged 20, launched the brand in France in 1929 by founding the Société Parisienne du yoghourt Danone. The first factory opened in 1932 in Levallois-Perret. The company progressively developed its distribution network in the Paris region, contributing to the spread of yoghurt into everyday consumption. The product range expanded rapidly. In 1937, Dany, the first fruit yoghurt, was launched. Fruit-flavored yoghurts were commercialized in 1953, smooth-style yoghurts in 1963, and gelled varieties in 1966.

In 1942 the occupation of France forced Daniel Carasso to take refuge in the United States. He continued developing the brand, acquired a yoghurt manufacturer, and launched Dannon Milk Products. On the advice of French publicist Raymond Loewy, the brand's spelling was Americanized to avoid mispronunciation. Dannon Inc. was incorporated in the United States.

Back in France, Daniel Carasso sold his American company to Beatrice Foods (it would be repurchased by Danone France in 1981) and sought to strengthen Danone. The company merged in 1967 with Fromageries Gervais to form Gervais-Danone.

=== From yoghurt to its jar (1970–1977) ===
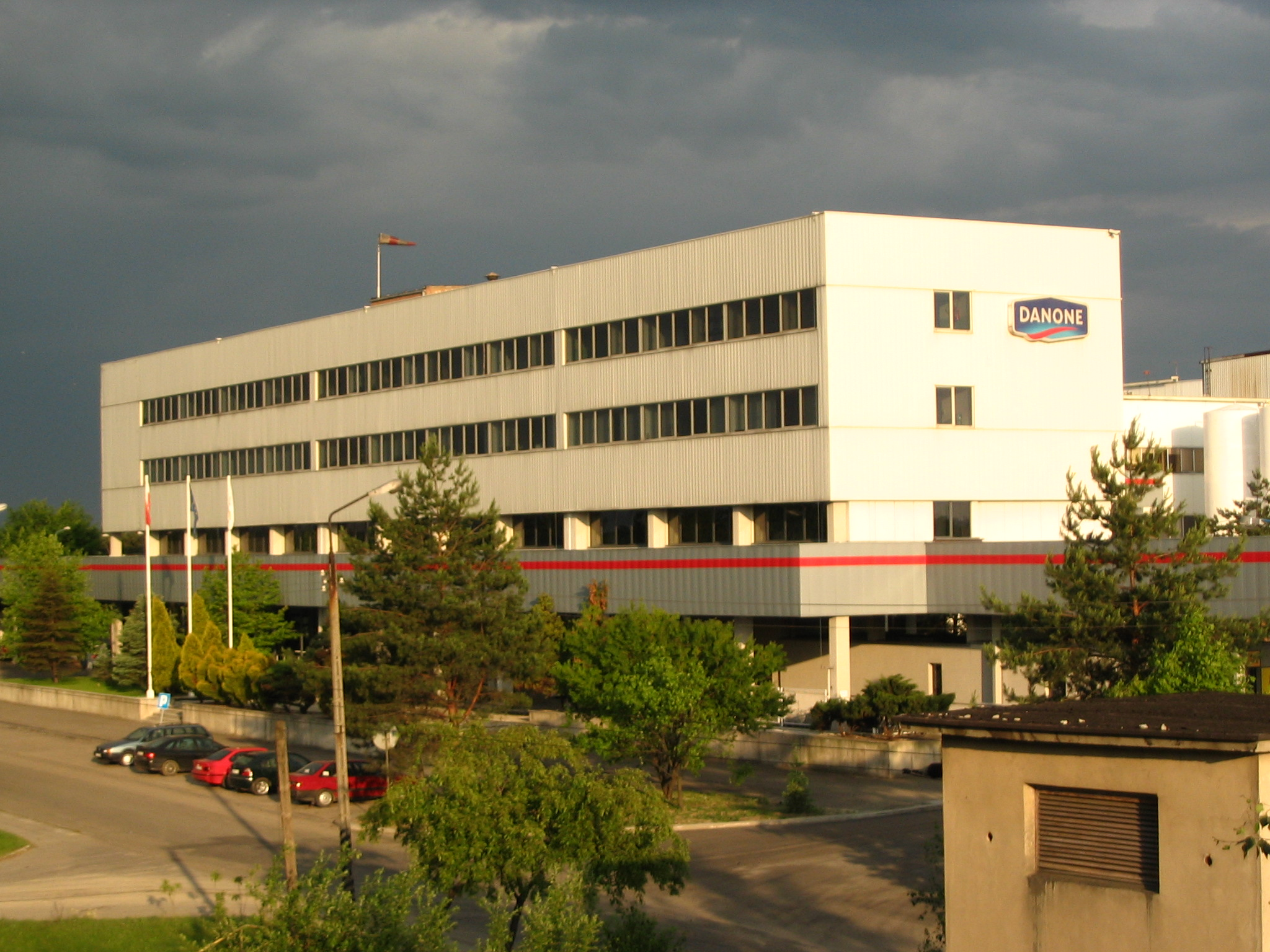
Danone's factory in Bieruń, Poland

In the early 1970s Gervais-Danone acquired numerous pasta and canned food brands: Milliat Frères, Panzani, Garbit, Petitjean, and Lhuissier, thereby becoming the leading pasta producer in France.

At the same time Boussois-Souchon-Neuvesel (BSN), initially present in the packaging market, saw its attempted takeover of glassmaker Saint-Gobain fail. Its chairman Antoine Riboud decided to reorient the company's strategy by diversifying into the food industry, with the objective of moving from packaging production to food products. BSN took control of the Évian and Badoit bottled mineral water brands, Blédina, and the Kanterbräu and Kronenbourg breweries, becoming a major player in the beer, mineral water, and infant nutrition sectors.

In 1973 BSN merged with Gervais Danone. The new entity was named BSN-Gervais-Danone. The group's main activities at that point were fresh products, beverages, pasta, and prepared meals. Antoine Riboud, who initiated the operation, took over its leadership.

=== Refocusing on food, diversification and group expansion (1978–1995) ===
In 1978 BSN-Gervais Danone acquired the Belgian brewery Alken. The following year, in the wake of the oil crisis, the company divested its flat glass activities and refocused on food. The group expanded and extended its activities across Europe. In 1980, it acquired the food branch of Générale Occidentale, specializing in grocery and confectionery, and owner of numerous brands including Carambar, Liebig, Vandamme, La Pie qui Chante, and Maille. BSN-Gervais Danone became France's leading food company.

In 1983 the group dropped the BSN-Gervais Danone name and simplified it to BSN. Despite this change, the fresh dairy products inherited from Gervais Danone remained a core activity.

In 1987 BSN entered the biscuit market by acquiring Générale Biscuit, owner of the LU brand and present in several European countries. Two years later, the group acquired several European subsidiaries of the American company Nabisco, including Belin. It thereby became the leading biscuit producer in Europe and one of the principal global players. The group's turnover at that time stood at 48.7 billion francs.

In 1993 BSN acquired Vivagel and combined its food activities with those of the Saint Louis Group group (Marie, William Saurin, La Belle Chaurienne) within a joint subsidiary named Panzalim. Following Saint-Louis's withdrawal in 1996, BSN recovered its full portfolio of brands.

As its international presence grew, the BSN name remained little-known to the general public – particularly as it was already used by a bank in Spain, a textile company in the United States, and a television channel in Japan. In a context of globalization, the group chose to leverage its most visible brand, Danone, which alone accounted for a quarter of turnover. In 1994, BSN changed its name to "Groupe Danone", represented by "the child with a star". The company at that point owned nearly 300 brands.

=== Refocusing on three areas and the beginning of internationalization (1996–2006) ===
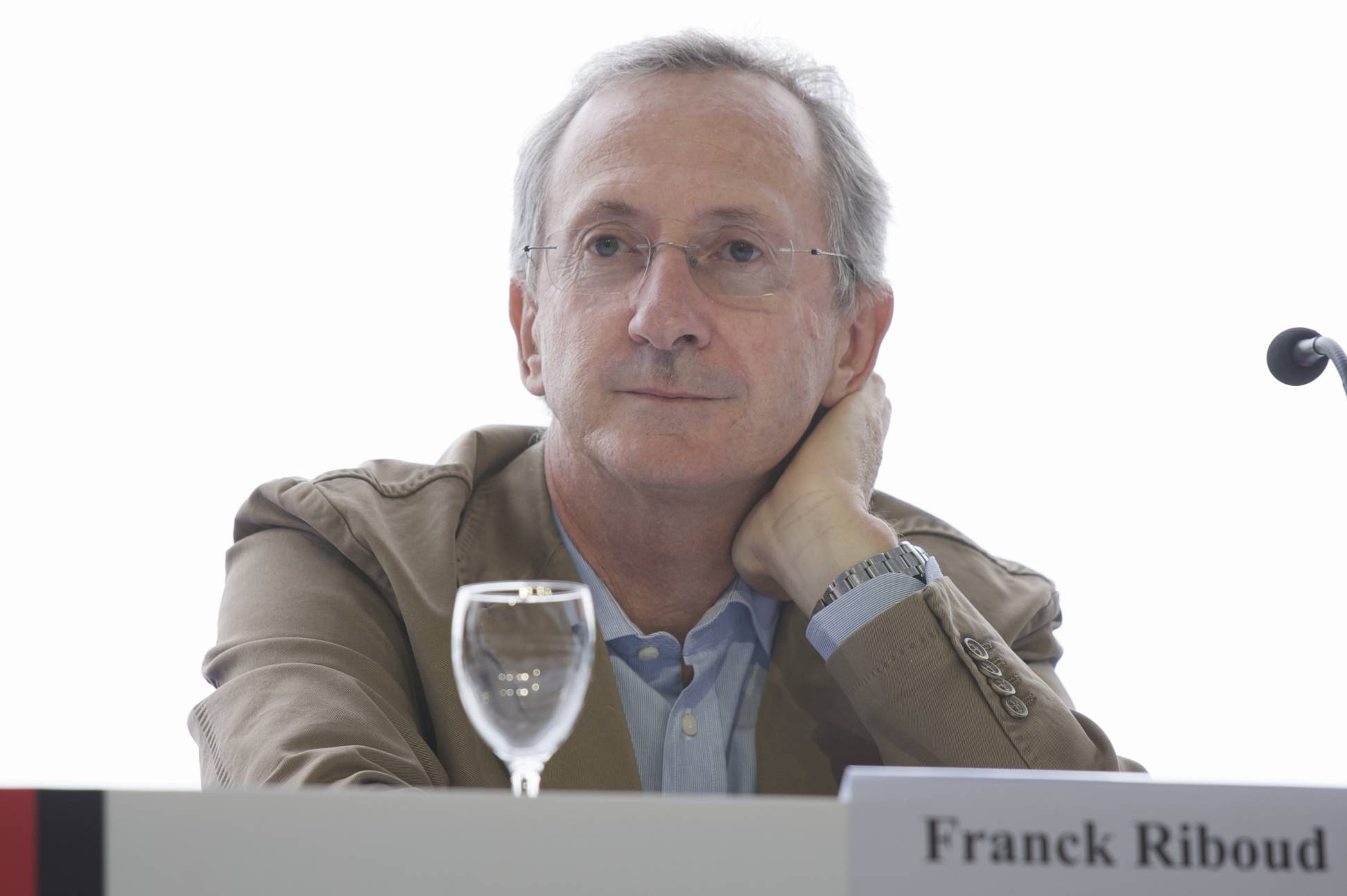
Franck Riboud, CEO of Danone from 1996 to 2014 and chairman of the board from 2014 to 2017, then honorary chairman since 2017

Franck Riboud, CEO of Danone from 1996 to 2014, chairman of the board of directors from 2014 to 2017, and honorary chairman since 2017.

In 1996 Antoine Riboud, chairman of the Danone group, retired at the age of 77 and stepped down from his position. His son Franck succeeded him. This year marked the beginning of a period of refocusing for the company around health and healthy eating, and an acceleration of its international development.

Following several acquisitions in emerging markets, the Danone group acquired 51% of Hangzhou Wahaha Group, the leading non-alcoholic beverage producer in China. Zong Qinghou, the company's founder, became chairman of Danone-Wahaha, which held nearly 39 joint ventures. All products were marketed under the Wahaha brand. Through this partnership, the Danone group generated three-quarters of its Chinese activity and 10% of its global sales.

In the years that followed, the company divested more than half of its grocery activities and all of its confectionery: Panzani, Amora Maille, and William Saurin were sold to Paribas Affaires Industrielles; Marie to Uniq plc; Liebig to Campbell's; and La Pie qui Chante, Carambar, and Vandamme to Cadbury.

At the same time the company accelerated its internationalization strategy in emerging markets and listed on the New York Stock Exchange in 1998. That same year, the group was the official supplier of dairy products at the FIFA World Cup. Three brands were highlighted: Danone, Évian, and LU. In 1999, the group divested its packaging and beer operations, including the sale of Kronenbourg and Alken-Maes breweries to Scottish & Newcastle in 2000. That same year, Danone chose to establish a research and development center in Palaiseau, in the Paris-Saclay scientific and technology cluster.

In the years that followed, Danone continued its development in emerging markets, notably in Latin America (Uruguay, Chile), Asia (China, Malaysia, Singapore, South Korea, and Vietnam), North Africa (Morocco, Algeria, Egypt), and the Middle East (Israel, Saudi Arabia), as well as in North America with the acquisition of Stonyfield Farm, a global leader in organic yoghurt.

On 10 January 2001 the newspaper Le Monde revealed the forthcoming closure of two LU factories. On 29 March, Danone announced the reorganization of its biscuit operations in Europe, aimed at rationalizing industrial capacity. The plan provided in particular for the closure of two LU factories in France, in Calais and Ris-Orangis, as well as the elimination of 1,780 jobs across Europe, including 570 in France. This decision provoked significant social and political mobilization in France, even as the company was profitable. Strikes, demonstrations, and calls to boycott Danone products were organized, relayed by certain elected officials, trade unions, and associations. The movement attracted considerable public attention, though it also generated divisions. The affair gave rise to a notable media controversy in spring 2001, affecting the group's image. It was also accompanied by legal proceedings related to the creation of critical websites against Danone: after an initial conviction, a court of appeal reaffirmed in 2003 the primacy of freedom of expression in this context.

Antoine Riboud died on 5 May 2002, aged 83.

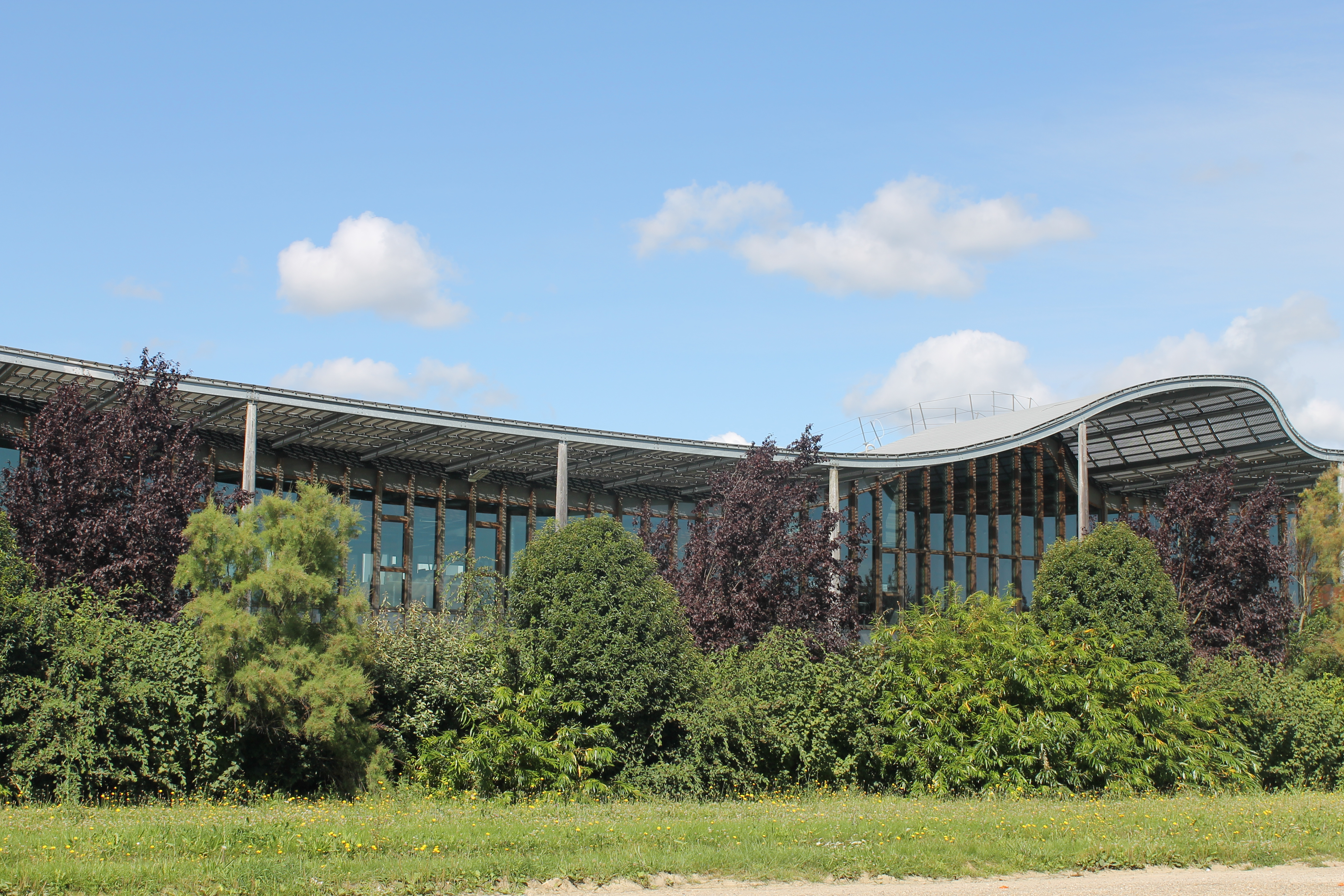
The Danone R&D center in Palaiseau (Paris-Saclay)

In July 2005 a rumor spread about a possible hostile takeover of Danone by PepsiCo. The story, broken by Challenges magazine, claimed that PepsiCo had acquired 3% of Danone's capital. Politicians from both left and right, as well as trade unions, rallied to defend the Danone group, describing it as "an industrial jewel". Pepsi denied any such intention, but the affair caused a significant stir, and the French government announced it would do everything possible to protect the Danone group. The Financial Markets Authority (AMF) announced that PepsiCo had certified on 24 July that it was not preparing a bid for the group.

At the same time Danone found that alongside the 39 joint-venture structures, some sixty factories and distribution companies were producing and selling beverages illegally under the Wahaha brand. The French group accused its Chinese partner of failing to respect the non-compete clauses. It then attempted to take control of these subsidiaries, but was rebuffed by Zong Qinghou, who denounced the intrusion of foreign companies in China. Wahaha alleged that the French company was aware of the situation and accused it of seeking too large a share in the joint ventures. Danone entered into negotiations and then took the matter to court in 2007. French President Nicolas Sarkozy even raised the case with Chinese President Hu Jintao during an official visit. In 2009, an amicable agreement was reached between the two parties. The Danone group exited the joint venture and sold its shares to its former partner. Following this separation, Danone left the non-alcoholic beverage market in China.

In 2006 Franck Riboud refocused Danone's activities on its three most promising businesses: fresh dairy products, bottled mineral water, and biscuits. These three sectors alone represented 85% of sales.

=== Continued internationalization around dairy products, water, and infant nutrition (2007–2019) ===
In 2007 Danone refocused once again and divested its biscuit activity — which included the Tuc, Belin, and LU brands – selling it to Kraft (subsequently renamed Mondelēz International). 7 July marked the end of the cooperation between Eden and Danone around the Château d'eau business.

Having divested all of the LU assets, the group launched a takeover bid for the Dutch company Numico on 8 July.

Danone thus acquired one of the global leaders in infant nutrition and medical nutrition. The transaction was completed for €12.3 billion. On 29 October, the Danone board of directors approved the sale of its Biscuits and cereal products division to Kraft Foods for €6.3 billion. From that point on, the company organized itself around four activities: fresh dairy products, water, infant nutrition, and medical nutrition.

Daniel Carasso, then honorary chairman of the company, died on 17 May 2009 at the age of 103.

On 18 June 2010 Danone partnered with Unimilk, one of Russia's leading milk producers. Together, they merged their fresh dairy product activities in Russia, Ukraine, Kazakhstan, and Belarus. This joint venture gave rise to the number one dairy products company in that region. Russia became the fifth most important market for the French company.

In 2010 the group also acquired Immédia, the third-largest smoothie producer in France, as well as the American company Medical Nutrition. With its $16 million in turnover, Medical Nutrition joined Danone's nutrition division, which that same year generated $70 million in North America. The objective was to strengthen Danone's position in health products and medical nutrition in particular, a fast-growing market. In April 2012, Danone was a candidate to acquire Pfizer's infant nutrition business, but that activity was ultimately sold to Nestlé. Like medical nutrition, infant nutrition was growing strongly in emerging markets.

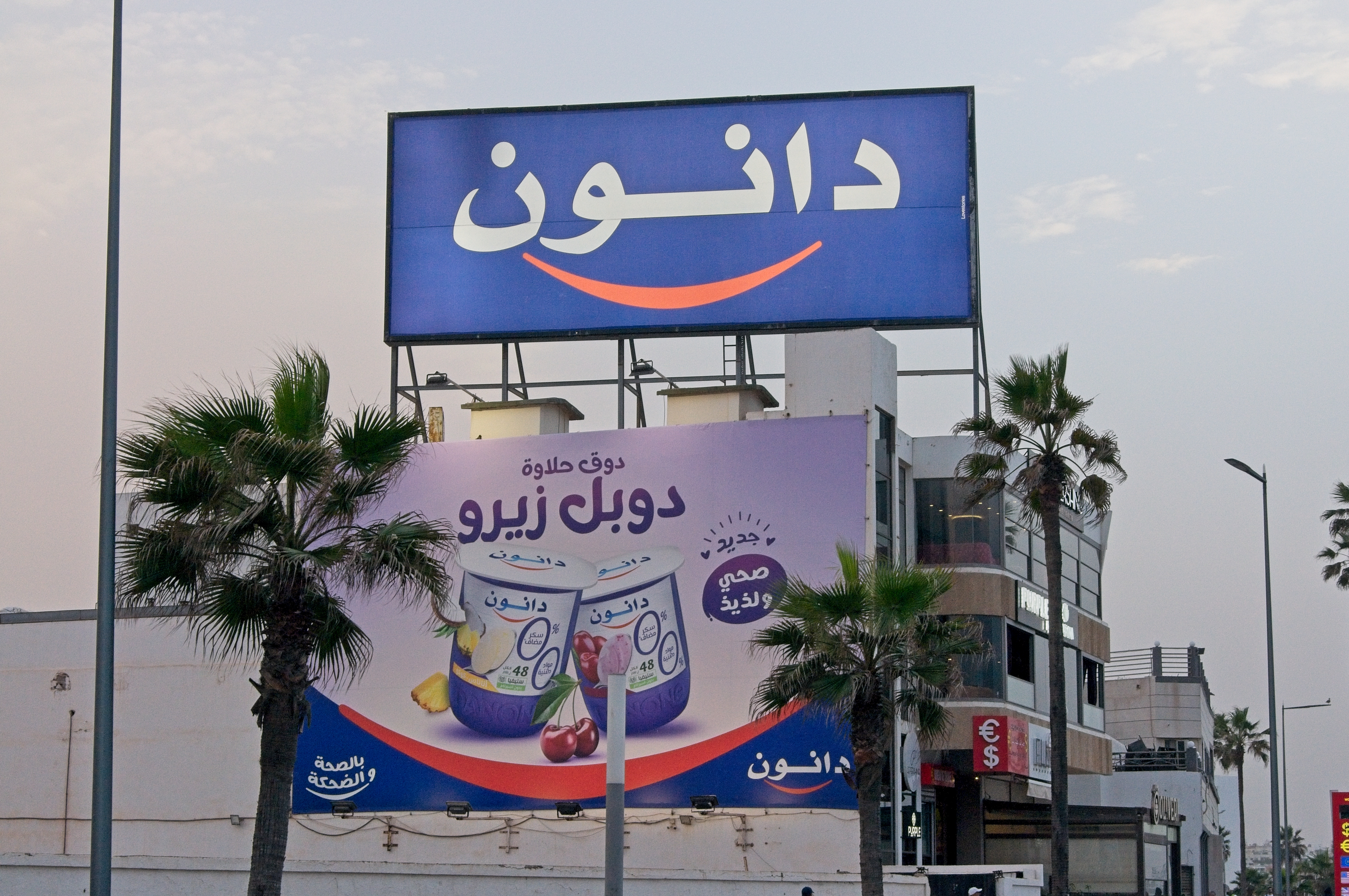
"Double zéro" advertisement on the Casablanca corniche in November 2024

In 2011 the share of sales achieved in emerging markets crossed a milestone, reaching 51%.

In June 2012 the group announced that it was raising its stake in Centrale Laitière, the Moroccan leader in dairy products – with whom Danone had worked since 1953 – to 67%.

In October 2012 Danone partnered with the Abraaj investment fund to acquire 49% of Fan Milk, a company that manufactures and distributes frozen dairy products and juices in Ghana, Nigeria, Togo, Burkina Faso, Benin, and Ivory Coast.

On 18 July 2014 Danone announced the acquisition of 40% of the capital of the Kenyan group Brookside, the leading dairy products group in East Africa.

On 20 May 2013 Danone announced a 4.0% strategic stake in Mengniu, the number one dairy products company in China, through an agreement with COFCO (China's leading state-owned food company and principal shareholder of Mengniu). In February 2014, Danone announced that it had raised its stake in Mengniu from 4.0% to 9.9%, for €486 million. Danone became the company's second largest shareholder. In parallel, in May 2013, a joint venture was created between Danone and Mengniu to develop the fresh dairy product category.

In August 2013 a false alert regarding the toxicity of ingredients in infant milks sold in Asia created a climate of panic.

In February 2014 Danone mandated investment bank JP Morgan with a view to divesting its medical nutrition division, valued at approximately €3 billion, before reaffirming its four core businesses (Fresh Dairy Products, Water, Infant Nutrition, and Medical Nutrition) in December 2014.

On 1 October 2014 Franck Riboud handed over the general management of the company to Emmanuel Faber.

On 31 October 2014 Danone, Mengniu, and Yashili announced that they had signed an agreement under which Danone participated in a reserved capital increase of the Chinese company Yashili for an amount of €437 million. Danone then held 25.0% of Yashili's capital.

In November 2015 Danone announced that it had concluded a definitive agreement with the Chinese group Yashili and its parent company Mengniu for the sale of the Dumex infant nutrition brand, for a price of €150 million. Dumex's sales in China had been significantly below their early 2013 levels, and the brand had been subject to a value write-down of €398 million.

In June 2016 Danone announced the acquisition of a 40% stake in Michel et Augustin. In July 2016, Danone announced the acquisition of WhiteWave Foods for $12.5 billion including assumed debt. This American company, specializing in organic dairy products and plant-based products, owns the Horizon Organic, Silk, and Earthbound Farm brands. In April 2017, to obtain competition authority clearance for the WhiteWave acquisition, Danone announced the sale of Stonyfield. In July 2017, Danone sold Stonyfield to Lactalis for $875 million (€768 million), to comply with requirements from US competition authorities.

In February 2018 Danone sold a 14% stake in Yakult for €1.5 billion, retaining only a 7% interest.

In April 2019 Danone announced the sale of Earthbound Farm, an American brand specializing in organic salads, to Taylor Farms.

In October 2020 Danone announced the sale of its residual 6.6% stake in Yakult Honsha for approximately €500 million, while retaining its joint ventures and partnership with the company.

=== Internal reorganization and governance crisis (2020–2021) ===
In November 2020 management announced, as part of its Local First plan, the elimination of 1,500 to 2,000 positions, including nearly 500 in France, to increase profitability and achieve €1 billion in savings by 2023. This prompted sharp criticism as the group simultaneously announced that it was highly profitable and had just returned €1.4 billion to shareholders.

In late January 2021 the arrival of investment fund Bluebell Capital as a shareholder of Danone called into question the presence of Emmanuel Faber at the head of Danone. In a letter sent to all shareholders in November 2020, Bluebell Capital deplored the "disappointing" stock market performance and argued that under Emmanuel Faber's chairmanship, "the right balance between shareholder value creation and sustainability issues" had not been respected.

In February 2021 Danone announced the acquisition of Earth Island, an American company specializing in plant-based products.

On 1 March 2021 the decision to once again separate the roles of chairman and chief executive was taken by the group's board of directors following pressure from Bluebell Capital and Artisan Partners. Both funds called on 3 March 2021 for Faber's removal from the chairmanship.

In March 2021 Emmanuel Faber was dismissed from his position, with shareholders considering that the company was becoming less profitable due to its corporate social and environmental responsibility policy.

In early April 2021 Danone's reorganization plan was launched: it provided for the elimination of 1,850 positions worldwide, including 458 in France. A few weeks later, the general meeting approved the payment of a dividend of €1.94 per share for 2020 results, representing a total of €1.3 billion returned to shareholders. By end of June 2021, the full scope of the redundancy plan was revealed: 1,200 positions were eliminated, notably among senior management, managers, sales staff, and assistants. In parallel, 770 positions were to be created.

=== Renew strategy and refocusing of the brand portfolio around health (since 2021) ===
In September 2021 Antoine de Saint-Affrique was officially appointed chief executive officer of Danone. This appointment came a few months after that of Gilles Schnepp as chairman of the board of directors. This governance change came in the context of performance deemed insufficient by a portion of shareholders and financial markets.

In March 2022 de Saint-Affrique presented his Renew Danone plan, which he intended to enable the company to return to profitable and sustainable growth. The plan rested notably on more active portfolio management, stronger financial discipline, and a refocusing on categories identified as priorities, particularly specialized nutrition, health, and certain high-value-added proteins. This strategic direction translated into several asset reallocation decisions during the year. In May in particular, Danone announced the end of its partnership with the Chinese group Mengniu, while recovering control of the Dumex Baby Food infant nutrition brand.

During the same period the group temporarily increased its deliveries of infant formula to the United States to address a national shortage, at the request of US authorities.

In February 2023 Danone inaugurated a new international research and innovation center on the Paris-Saclay plateau at a cost of €100 million. The construction of the site was part of a property and industrial project aimed at consolidating research and development activities previously spread across multiple sites.

Alongside its restructuring, the group faced major geopolitical developments. In October 2022, Danone announced its intention to disengage from Russia, where it employed more than 7,000 people, following Russia's invasion of Ukraine in 2022 and the associated sanctions. In July 2023, the Russian state took control of Danone's assets in the country, leading the group to deconsolidate these activities, which represented approximately 5% of its global turnover. In March 2024, these activities were ultimately sold to a close associate of Ramzan Kadyrov for the equivalent of €177 million. Asset write-downs related to this disposal are estimated at more than €1 billion.

Still a priority for the group, portfolio rotation accelerated in early 2024 with the announcement of the disposal of its organic dairy product activities in the United States, comprising the Horizon Organic and Wallaby brands, to the American investment firm Platinum Equity. These activities represented approximately 3% of the group's turnover. The sales of these brands was presented in the financial press as a concrete application of the Renew strategic plan, aimed at concentrating investments on segments considered more promising in terms of growth and profitability, while focusing more squarely on health and medical nutrition. In February 2024, Danone announced an investment of €43 million in the refitting of its factory in the Gers, at Villecomtal-sur-Arros, now dedicated to the production of plant-based proteins.

In June the group declared its intention to focus further on health and medical nutrition to increase its sales. This direction translated into several targeted acquisitions. In May 2025, Danone announced the acquisition of a majority stake in the American company Kate Farms, specializing in medical nutrition, for an undisclosed amount. On 25 June 2025, the group also acquired the Belgian company The Akkermansia Company, specializing in research on biotics and gut microbiota.

In March 2026 Danone announced the signing of an agreement to acquire the British company Huel, specializing in ready-to-consume meal solutions and nutritionally balanced products, marketed primarily through direct-to-consumer online sales. This acquisition is part of the group's continued recentering toward functional nutrition and health-related consumption segments. In August 2026, the deal was cleared by the Competition and Markets Authority.

== Main brands ==
Category	Brands
Water	Aqua, Badoit, Bonafont, Évian, Hayat, Font Vella, La Salvetat, Mizone, Salus, Volvic, Żywiec Zdrój
Specialized nutrition	Aptamil, Bebelac, Blédina, Cow & Gate, Dumex, Happy Family, Karicare, Laboratoire Gallia, Malyutka, Mellin, Milupa, Nutrilon, SGM
Dairy and plant-based products	Activia, Alpro, Danette, Danone, Danonino, International Delight, Les 2 Vaches, Light & Free, Oikos, Silk, YoPro

== Finances ==
	2016	2017	2018	2019	2020	2021	2022	2023	2024	2025
Total revenue (€ bn)	21.9	24.7	24.7	25.3	23.6	24.3	27.7	27.6	27.4	27.3
Net profit (€ bn)	1.7	2.5	2.4	1.9	2.0	1.9	1.0	1.0	2.0	1.9
Total assets (€ bn)	44.0	44.3	44.2	45.4	42.8	45.4	45.3	44.5	45.3	45.1
Total equity (€ bn)	13.2	14.5	16.5	17.4	16.3	17.4	18.0	16.2	17.9	17.0
Employees	99,190	105,000	106,000	102,000	98,850	98,100	96,170	88,840	89,530	88,670

== Corporate governance ==
=== Company leadership ===
From 1966 to 2014, Danone was led by a single chairman and chief executive officer:

- Antoine Riboud: 1966–1996
- Franck Riboud: 1996–2014

On 1 September 2014, Danone's governance evolved with the separation of the chairman and chief executive roles and the establishment of a strengthened chairmanship:

- chairman of the board of directors: Franck Riboud
- chief executive officer and vice-chairman of the board: Emmanuel Faber

In 2017, Emmanuel Faber was appointed chairman and chief executive officer, succeeding Franck Riboud, who became honorary chairman.

In March 2021 the board of directors of Danone decided once again to separate the roles of chairman and chief executive, on the proposal of Emmanuel Faber who was to retain the chairmanship but hand over the chief executive function. On 14 March, however, the board decided to remove Emmanuel Faber with immediate effect and to replace him on an interim basis by Gilles Schnepp, former chairman and chief executive officer of Legrand.

In May 2021 a report in Le Figaro announced the appointment of Antoine Bernard de Saint-Affrique to succeed Emmanuel Faber as the group's chief executive officer from September 2021.

=== Board of directors ===
As of 14 December 2024 the 11 members of the board of directors are as follows:

- Gilles Schnepp – chairman of the board of directors
- Valérie Chapoulaud-Floquet – Lead director, independent director
- Frédéric Boutebba – Political and social affairs, non-independent director
- Antoine de Saint-Affrique – chief executive officer, non-independent director
- Gilbert Ghostine – Chairman of the Sandoz board of directors, independent director
- Lise Kingo – Company director, chair of the CSR committee, independent director
- Patrice Louvet – President and chief executive officer of Polo Ralph Lauren, member of the nomination, remuneration and governance committee, independent director
- Sanjiv Mehta – Company director, member of the audit committee, independent director
- Géraldine Picaud – chief executive officer of SGS, chair of the audit committee, independent director
- Susan Roberts – Associate Dean for fundamental research, Professor of Medicine and Epidemiology, member of the CSR committee, independent director
- Bettina Theissig – Director representing employees and member of the CSR committee, non-independent director.

== Ownership ==
Ownership of Danone is split as follows: 43% is owned by American investors, 19% by French investors, followed by the UK (10%), Switzerland (6%), Germany (5%) and the rest of Europe (17%).

== Joint ventures ==
In some areas, Danone has adopted a strategy of growth through joint ventures, particularly in fast-growing emerging markets which represent over 50% of its sales.

Danone signed joint ventures with Al Safi in Saudi Arabia (2001), Yakult in India (2005) and Vietnam (2006), Alquería in Colombia (2007), and Mengniu in China (2013–2014).

=== Australia ===
Danone Murray Goulburn is a joint Saputo Dairy Australia venture with French food company Danone – to market yoghurt and other fresh dairy products in Australia. Danone-MG dairy foods are produced at Kiewa in north east Victoria and are sold throughout Australia.

=== Bangladesh ===
In November 2005 Franck Riboud met Muhammad Yunus, founder of the Grameen Bank and later winner of the 2006 Nobel Peace Prize. The two men discussed at length their ideas on the development of poor countries and found that their areas of expertise were complementary. As a result, in 2006, the Grameen Bank and Danone formed a company called Grameen Danone Foods, a social business in Bangladesh.

Grameen Danone Foods Ltd produces a yoghurt called Shokti Doi containing protein, vitamins, iron, calcium, zinc, and other micronutrients aimed to fill nutritional deficits of children in Bangladesh. Shokti Doi is sold for six euro cents, a price that studies found to be affordable for the poorest families. Its pursuit of profitability is based solely on criteria such as improving public health, creating jobs, reducing poverty and protecting the environment. Profits earned by the company are re-invested in expanding and running the business.

=== India ===
Danone started its nutrition business in India in 2012 through the acquisition of the nutrition portfolio from Wockhardt Group. Danone India offers a range of specialized products across life stages that includes pregnancy, infants, young children as well as adults, under Indian and global brands like Aptamil, Neocate, Farex, Protinex, Dexolac and Nusobee. Headquartered in Mumbai. In 2018, Danone reduced its product portfolio and discontinued some dairy SKUs to bring a sharper focus on its nutrition offerings.

=== Israel ===
In March 1996 Danone signed an agreement to purchase 20 percent of the Strauss Group, Israel's second largest food manufacturer. Since the 1970s, Strauss Dairies had a series of partnership and knowledge agreements with Danone.

=== Saudi Arabia ===
In 2001 Al-Safi and Danone formed a partnership.

=== China ===
Danone has invested in China since 1987 with the joint venture with Fengxing Milk in Guangzhou. It is one of Danone's top 5 markets.

==== Bright Dairy ====
In 2001 Danone acquired a 5% stake in Bright Dairy and, in March 2005, doubled its shareholding, and again, to 20%, in April 2006, becoming the third largest shareholder after Shanghai Milk Group and S.I. Food.

The parties announced in October 2007 that Danone would divest its stake by selling it to the other two main shareholders at a small profit. Bright Dairy said Danone would pay 330m yuan (€31m) to terminate the existing distribution and production agreement with it.

==== Wahaha ====
The Hangzhou Wahaha Group, the largest beverage producer in China, and Danone entered into a dairy products joint venture in 1996, in which Danone held 51%. It was hailed by Forbes magazine as a "showcase" joint venture.

Yet in 2005 Danone noted that alongside the 39 structures of the joint venture, 60 factories and distribution companies produce and sell beverages illegally under the Wahaha brand. Danone made several attempts to take a stake in the Wahaha companies external to the joint venture, but was rebuffed by Wahaha's general manager Zong Qinghou. Danone and Zong Qinghou had signed a deal in December 2006 allowing Danone to buy a majority stake in these non-JV operations. However, Zong had second thoughts about the deal and reneged, claiming the offer was underpriced and held out for a higher price from Danone.

The dispute took on the shape of a trademark dispute, and Danone filed for arbitration in Stockholm on 9 May 2007. On 4 June, Danone filed suit in Los Angeles Superior Court against Ever Maple Trading and Hangzhou Hongsheng Beverage Co Ltd, companies controlled by Zong, his wife, and daughter.

In 2009 an agreement was reached between the two parties. Danone left the Danone–Wahaha joint venture and sold its shares (51%) to its former Chinese partner.

==== Mengniu ====
On 20 May 2013 Danone announced a strategic investment (4.0%) in Mengniu, the top dairy products company in China, through an agreement with COFCO (the state-owned largest food company in China a majority shareholder in Mengniu). Later on, Danone raised its interest in Mengniu from 4.0% to 9.9%. In 2016, Danone is Mengniu's second shareholder.

In addition, in May 2013 a joint-venture was created between Danone and Mengniu to grow the fresh dairy product category.

On 31 October 2014 Danone, Mengniu and Yashili announced that they had signed an agreement allowing Danone to take part in a private placement by Yashili totalling €437 million, at a price of HK$3.70 per share. Upon completion of the subscription, Mengniu and Danone respectively held 51.0% and 25.0% equity interest in Yashili.

=== Russia ===
On 18 June 2010 Danone partnered with Unimilk, one of Russia's main milk producers. Danone and Unimilk merged their fresh dairy products activities in Russia, Ukraine, Kazakhstan and Belarus. The joint-venture gave birth to the number one dairy products company in this region. Russia became one of the five most important markets for Danone.

In October 2022 Danone announced the start of the process of transferring its Russian segment to new owners. By this point, Russia provided about 5% of the company's total revenue. The company considered about two dozen possible applicants for its assets, but as of July 2023, the "successor" has not been decided. In the meantime, Danone rebranded one of its top brands: Activia in the Russian market becoming Aktibio. The company said that this will allow renewed investment in the Russian dairy industry. In July 2023, the Russian government seized the shares in Danone Russia and placed it under the control of the Russian Federal Agency for State Property Management. On 18 July, Ibragim Zakriev, the Minister of Agriculture of Chechnya and the nephew of its President Ramzan Kadyrov, was appointed General Director of the Russian Danone. As of 26 July 2023 Danone has provided €700 million for the loss of Russian business, plus €500 million exchange loss due to the fall in the ruble.

=== Africa ===
In June 2012 Danone raised its interest in Centrale Laitière (leader of the dairy products market in Morocco) to 67.0%. Centrale Laitière is Danone's first franchise ever: the companies have worked together since 1953.

In October 2013 Danone teamed up with Abraaj Group to acquire FanMilk International, the leading manufacturer and distributor of frozen dairy products and juices in Ghana, Togo, Nigeria, Burkina Faso, Benin and Ivory Coast.

In July 2014 Danone announced the acquisition of a 40% interest in Kenya's Brookside, East Africa's leading dairy products group.

=== Philippines ===
In October 2014 Danone partnered with Universal Robina to build a beverage production and distribution business in the Philippines.

== Danone Institute ==
The Danone Institute is a nonprofit organization established to promote research, information and education about nutrition, diet and public health. One of the organization's main objectives was to increase nutrition knowledge amongst medical professionals, educators and parents.

The company set up its first Institute in 1991 in Paris, France, and officially launched as a private nonprofit organization in 1997.

The institute is led by nutrition experts and Danone company executives.

=== Danone Institutes around the world ===
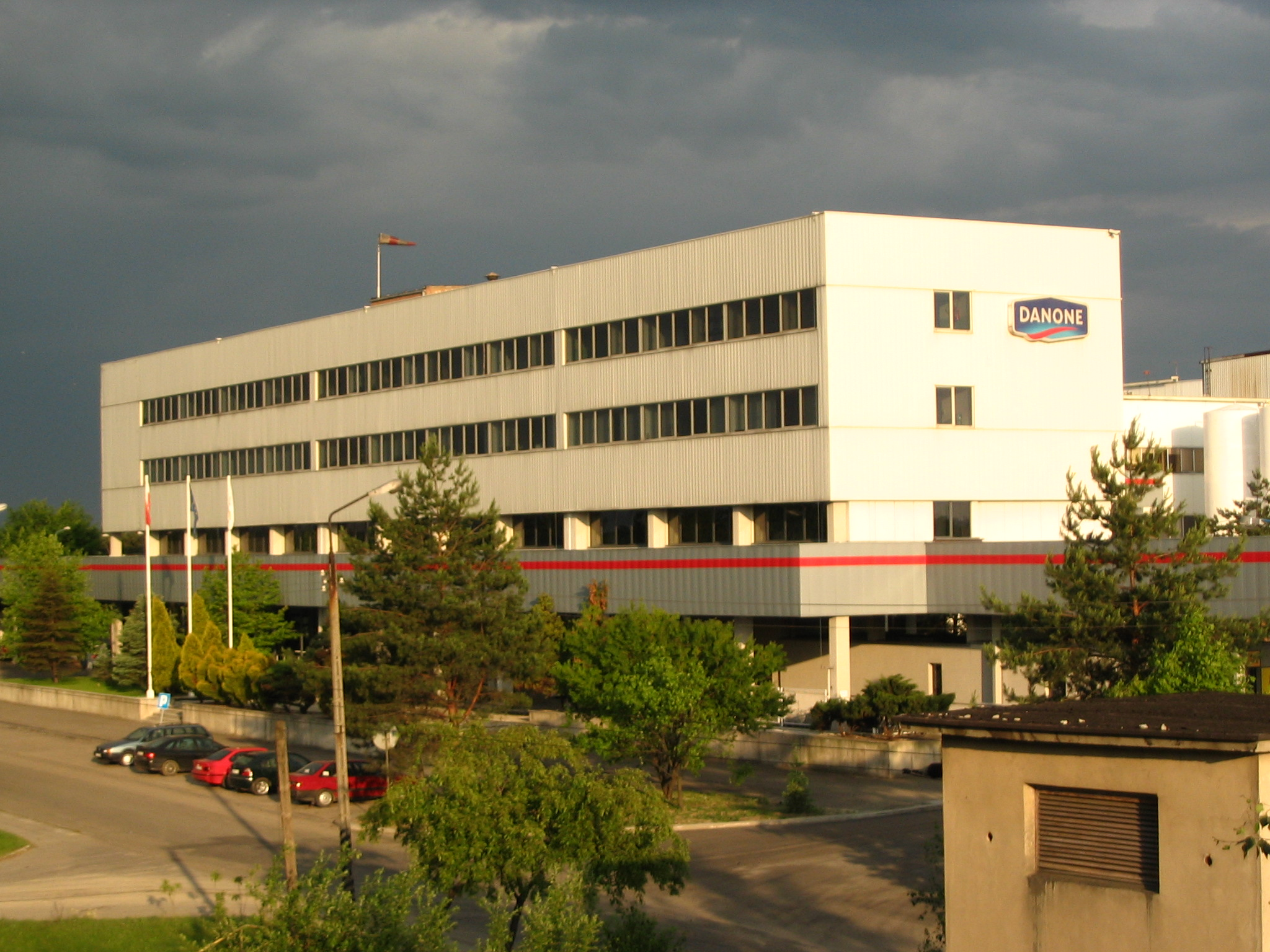
Danone factory in Bieruń, Poland, pictured in 2006

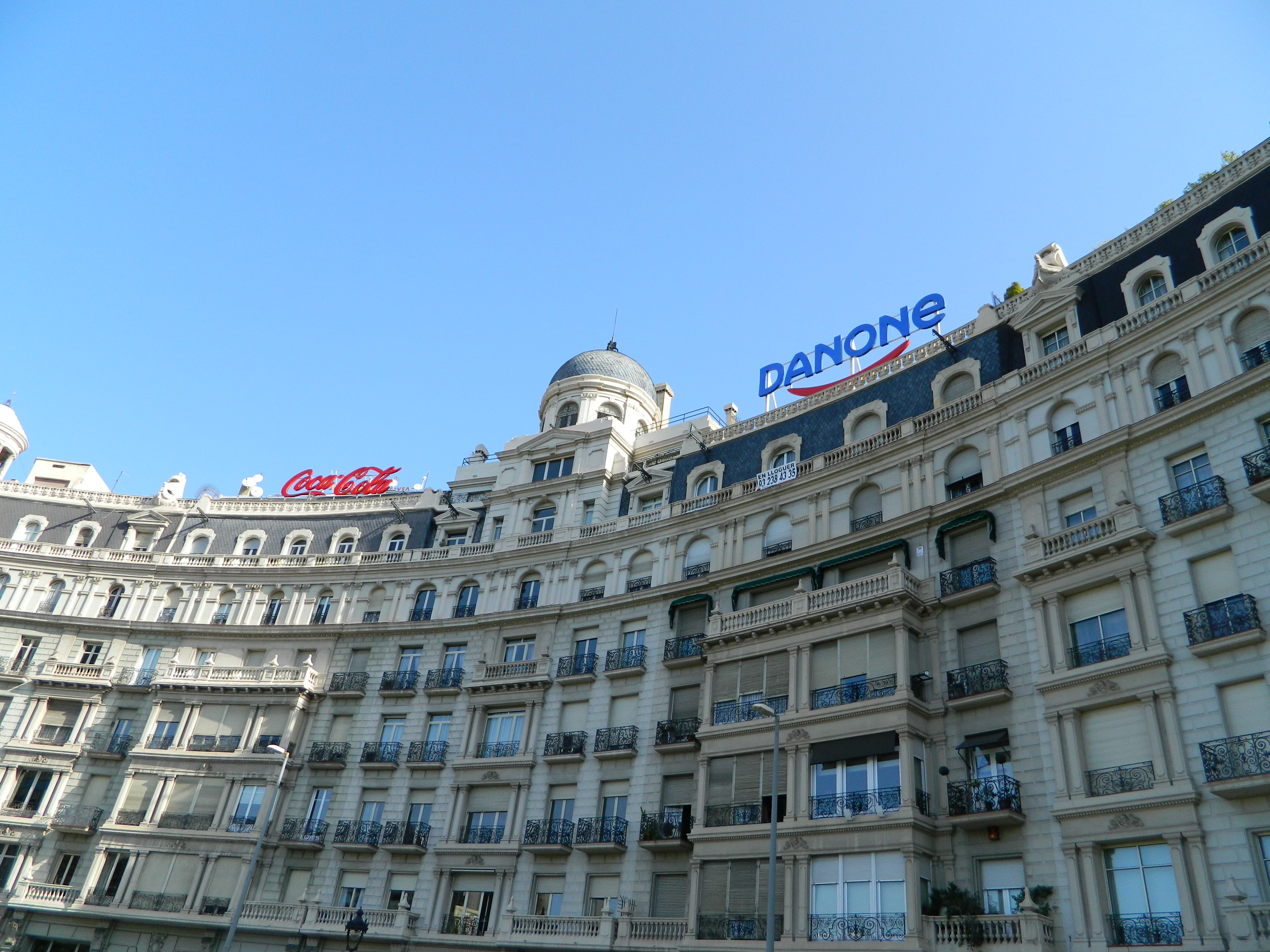
Danone advertising in Barcelona, 2012

By 2007 Danone had set up 18 institutes in countries around the world to develop programs that address local public health issues. The institutes are located in Belgium, Canada, China, the Czech Republic, France, Germany, Indonesia, Israel, Italy, Japan, Mexico, Poland, Russia, Spain, the United States, and Turkey.

They operate under the aegis of the Danone Institute International. The Danone Institute International is responsible for steering the network, and encouraging a continual exchange between the various countries.

Since 2018 more than 200 experts in diet and nutrition are involved in this international network.

Each institute is composed of a board of directors and a scientific council. Each board includes 8 members. The board members are responsible for setting the strategic direction and budget for the organization. The scientific council that is composed of from 6 to 10 members, takes future programmatic decisions.

The institutes develop educational programs in their countries to deal with local health and nutrition issues. Each institute therefore develops its own program to be relevant in their environment. For instance, the Czech Danone Institute provides a fund to support research, development and education in nutrition, and scholarships abroad.

Each local Danone Institute develops specific programs including:

- Support research programs: scholarships, grants, awards, prizes
- Publications of research findings relating to health and nutrition
- Organization of scientific conferences
- Publication of newsletters and books for professionals (e.g., health care professionals, educators, journalists)
- Organization of workshops, training and educational sessions for professionals
- Production of pedagogic material, booklets, television and radio programs, PC games for parents, children...
- Spread the knowledge to the public

Throughout the world the Danone Institutes continue to be nonprofit organizations.

The Danone Institutes gather internationally renowned scientists in diet and nutrition from independent organizations (e.g.: universities, research centers).

From 1991 to 2006 more than 40 prizes and awards have been attributed for more than €600,000. Over 140 events have gathered more than 30,000 health care professionals. And 75 publications have been published. More than 70 programs towards the public have been organized.

To date Danone Institutes have funded more than 900 research projects. This represents a global budget of €16 million. They have set up dozens of educational programs. 100 symposia have been launched.

=== Danone Institute International ===
The Danone Institute International was established in 2004 to gather together the 18 Danone Institutes. Its goal is to develop large-scale international programs. It also aims at encouraging the sharing of the knowledge between the local institutes. It facilitates cooperation, collaboration and exchange between scientists.

Danone Institute International is a nonprofit organization originally established with funding from Danone. The association promotes the exchange of information related to the relationship between diet, nutrition and health.

The Danone Institute International comprises more than 220 scientific experts, and may be considered as a think tank. This international network gathers renowned scientists from various fields such as clinical nutrition, pediatric medicine, microbiology, gastroenterology, and psychology.

The Danone Institute International produces publications, supports research via grants, programs and a prize. The DII also organizes international academic conferences and symposia.

The Danone International Prize For Nutrition is a cornerstone in the work of the Danone Institute International.

=== Danone International Prize for Nutrition ===
The Danone International Prize for Nutrition is an award established in 1997 by the Danone Institute International, presented every two years to honour individuals or teams that have advanced the science of human nutrition.

The prize aims at encouraging nutrition research and promoting the public's understanding of the importance of this field.

This award is one of the most respected awards within the field of nutritional research. Many leading scientists received this award, that recognizes their accomplishments.

The Danone International Prize for Nutrition is worth €120,000. The prize is awarded every two years by the Danone Institute International and organized with the support of the French organization Fondation pour la recherche médicale.

The Danone International Prize for Nutrition recognizes a single researcher or a research team as leading a major step in nutrition, developing novel concepts, including research fields with potential application for populations.

The jury consists of up to nine members, including one member of the Fondation pour la Recherche Médicale. 50% of the jury members come from the Danone Institute International or the Danone Institutes. The jury selects one winner by a secret vote. In case of a tie, the chair's vote counts as two votes.

Danone Institute International selected in 2007 Friedman through a process involving more than 650 applicants worldwide. Candidates must be employed by a not-for-profit institution and actively involved in research. Laureates are chosen after an independent and international selection procedure.

This prize has been renamed the Danone International Prize for Alimentation in 2018.

Prize winners: Source: Danone International

- 2016 Philip Calder, for his outstanding work on nutrition and immunity.
- 2013 Gökhan S. Hotamisligil, Harvard School of Public Health, for his outstanding research in immunology and metabolic diseases.
- 2011 Jeffery I. Gordon, Center for Genome Sciences and Systems Biology, Washington University School of Medicine, St. Louis, for his outstanding contribution to scientific research on the human gut microbiome, diet and nutritional status.
- 2009 Johan Auwerx, École Polytechnique Fédérale de Lausanne, for his research in molecular nutrition.
- 2007 Jeffrey M. Friedman, Rockefeller University and Howard Hughes Medical Institute; for research on the role of genetics and leptin, a hormone he discovered, in body-weight regulation.
- 2005 David J. P. Barker, epidemiologist at the Developmental Origins of Health and Disease Division Research Centre of Southampton University, UK and at the Heart Research Centre, Oregon Health and Science University, US, for the Barker Early Origins Hypothesis, also known as the fetal origins hypothesis or the thrifty phenotype hypothesis.
- 2003 Ricardo Bressani, for his life-time commitment to maximise the understanding of the nutritional potential and limitations of local basic foods
- 2001 Alfred Sommer and team from the School of Hygiene and Public Health at Johns Hopkins University, for his work on Vitamin A deficiency
- 1999 Leif Hallberg, for his work on iron metabolism
- 1997 Vernon R. Young, for his work on protein and amino acids metabolism

=== Global summit on the health effects of yogurt ===
In 2012 the Danone Institute International in collaboration with the American Society for Nutrition (ASN) organized an international working group to examine the health effects of yogurt. They communicated their scientific conclusion to health care professionals and the public. One year later, the ASN and the Danone Institute International joined forces to launch the first global summit on the health effects of yogurt.

This event aims at evaluating the state of science as concerns yogurt consumption and public health.

The first summit took place in 2013 in Boston. It featured international experts in medicine and nutrition. Since that time, summits have been held every year.

=== Yogurt in Nutrition Initiative for a balanced diet ===
In 2013 the Danone Institute International, the American Society for Nutrition (ASN) and the Nutrition Society (NS) launched the Yogurt in Nutrition Initiative for a balanced diet. This program aims at examining the health effects of yogurt, encouraging research around yogurt as part of a healthy diet and communicating scientific information toward health care professionals and the public.

Through this project, the Danone Institute International plans to organize worldwide conferences to share researchers' findings. From 2013, the Yogurt in Nutrition Initiative for a balanced diet co-organizes every year Global Summit on the Health Effects of Yogurt.

The Danone Institute International in collaboration with the American Society for Nutrition and the International Osteoporosis Foundation also organizes the Yogurt in Nutrition Award. This prize is offered by the Yogurt in Nutrition Initiative for a balanced diet. This award, valued at US$30,000, supports projects focused on the role of yogurt in the prevention and management of diseases. It finances research programs for two years. It recognizes individuals or research teams from public organizations, universities or hospitals.

== Corporate social responsibility ==
Danone operates several funds including: danone.communities, created in 2007 to finance social business, the Danone Ecosystem Fund, created in 2009 to provide support to Danone partners including farmers, subcontractors, and vendors, and Livelihoods, created in 2011 to finance environment-related projects (such as peasant agriculture, deforestation, access to energy in emerging countries) and in return provide investors with carbon credits with strong social intensity.

Danone's corporate social responsibility programs were influenced by former CEO, Antoine Riboud, and a speech he gave on 25 October 1972 known as the "Marseilles speech".

In this speech he stated that growth should not take place without corporate social responsibility. He was the first CEO to publicly state that human and environment aspects of a company should be taken into account. These ideas laid the ground to Danone's dual project (economic and social).

Danone has set a target to reduce its methane emissions from fresh milk by 30% by 2030, including by increasing its plant milk portfolio. However, it has been criticized by environmental researchers for overstating its progress and overrelying on greenhouse gas removal.

In 2020 Danone announced that it would source 100% of its eggs from cage-free suppliers by 2025.

== Controversies ==
=== 2005–2008 ===
==== PepsiCo acquisition case ====
Due to its narrow focus and relatively small size, Danone was an attractive takeover target for its competitors, namely Nestlé and Kraft Foods. In mid-July 2005, the share price of Danone rose 20% within two weeks on rumours of a bid approach by PepsiCo, although this intention was denied. Upon realising that a takeover of a national treasure such as Danone by a foreign company was indeed possible in the capital markets, the "economically patriotic" French government stepped in by drafting a law to protect companies in "strategic industries" such as Danone from takeover. This has been dubbed the "Danone Law".

Speculation was renewed once again in mid-2006, when PepsiCo declared its intention to grow significantly in France through a sizeable non-hostile acquisition, and Kraft was also reported in Le Figaro, a French daily newspaper, as not having ruled out an acquisition in France. The stock market apparently marked down the possibility of a bid by PepsiCo following Danone's acquisition of Numico.

==== Skeletons controversy ====
In 2008 Skeletons, a Danone owned yoghurt product marketed towards Russian children, was removed from sale after complaints about the use of skeleton characters in its marketing materials causing children psychological trauma.

=== 2010–2013 ===
In the 2010s reports indicated that Danone engaged in unethical marketing of infant formula in China, Indonesia, Turkey and India.

==== India ====
In the early 2010s Nutricia India (Danone) purchased Wockhardt's nutrition business, which thereby provided Danone with an entry to India's infant nutrition market. Nutricia later ordered and scheduled an external audit of payments made and invoices received from March through August 2013 and found no payments to doctors. However, critics contended the company directed the course of the audit, and more importantly, scheduled the audit so that it did not cover the crucial handover period. In fact, it was scheduled nearly a year after the purchase. A policy director for Baby Milk Action stated that Nutricia "seems to be using the audit as a cover".

India passed a law pertaining to Infant Milk Substitutes (IMS) in 1992 and strengthened this law in 2003. These prohibit any kind of advertisement of infant formula for children 0–2, as well as prohibit monetary benefits to doctors for recommending formula. Still, major companies including Danone have been criticized for sponsoring such things as nutritional conferences and web platforms for doctors. (Other companies include Nestle, Abbott, and Mead Johnson.)

Dexolac is the name of Danone's infant milk substitute product. Overall in India, approximately 50% of infants under six months of age are exclusively breastfed, and 50% are not.

==== China ====
In October 2012 a Save the Children survey was conducted in the cities of Hohhot, Beijing, Jinan, Shanghai, Nanjing, and Shenzhen. Sixty mothers of infants 0–6 months were interviewed in each city. 40% of the mothers interviewed said they had received formula samples. Of these, 60% were provided by company representatives, and over one-third by healthcare workers. The mothers reported that samples were provided by (in order of frequency): Dumex (Danone, and since May 2016 Yashili), Enfamil (Mead Johnson), Wyeth, Abbott, Nestlé, Friso, Ausnutria and Bei-yin-mei. The overall 2013 Save the Children report which includes this 2012 survey states, "If new mothers are given free samples to feed to their babies it can start a vicious circle that undermines their own ability to breastfeed. An infant satiated with formula may demand less breast milk, so the mother produces less, and that can result in her losing confidence in her ability to breastfeed."

==== Indonesia subsidiary ====
In February 2013 The Guardian reported that up until 2011, Danone subsidiary Sari Husada had midwives sign contracts to receive financial payments for selling a certain number of boxes of baby formula. According to Danone, this no longer happens, and has been replaced by a scheme which runs training for midwives. However, the main difference appears to be a change from cash to merchandise such as televisions or laptops, and often including items which are needed in the midwives' practices, such as oxygen canisters, TENS machines, and nebulisers. The Guardian has seen a spreadsheet detailing the number of new mothers contacted, the amount of 0–6 months formula sold, and the proportion of their target this represents. Danone commented: "That may still be happening, that's something we need to address."

This same article reported that Sari Husada (Danone) had links throughout the Indonesian medical system. For example, Sari Husada sponsored professional associations, paid doctors for running seminars for midwives, and even sponsored midwifery awards which were then presented by the Indonesian Minister for Women's Empowerment and the Protection of Children.

There are two potential harms to promoting infant formula in poorer communities: (1) the parents and families may not have dependable access to clean water, and (2) the ongoing cost is such a significant part of the family budget that parents are highly motivated to attempt to "stretch" the product, with risk of malnourishment to infant or child. An Indonesian paediatrician stated, "Selling formula is like the killing fields, in my opinion. The babies will die of diarrhoea and they will die of malnutrition."

==== Turkey marketing campaign ====
In June 2013 the organisation was accused in Turkey of "misleading mothers with a marketing campaign that warned they might not be providing enough breast milk to their babies [and suggesting] mothers use its powdered baby milk to make up any shortfall". Danone responded that it "based its advice on WHO guidance" and claimed that both the WHO and UNICEF "endorsed the campaign." The WHO said Danone did not have permission to use its logo and asked Danone to remove its name from the company's marketing materials within 14 days while Ayman Abulaban, the UNICEF representative for Turkey, said: "The Unicef Turkey office has not endorsed this campaign." UNICEF also requested that their name be removed from marketing materials.

=== Fonterra New Zealand alert ===
Following a statement by the New Zealand government and Fonterra on 2 August 2013 warning that batches of ingredients supplied by Fonterra to four Danone plants in Asia-Pacific might be contaminated with Clostridium botulinum bacteria, Danone recalled selected infant formula products from sale in eight markets (New Zealand, Singapore, Malaysia, China, Hong Kong, Vietnam, Cambodia and Thailand) as a precautionary measure.

The alert was lifted on 28 August when New Zealand Ministry for Primary Industries concluded after several weeks of tests that there was no Clostridium botulinum in any of the batches concerned. None of the many tests conducted by Danone before and after this period showed any contamination.

On 8 January 2014 Danone announced its decision to terminate its existing supply contract with Fonterra and make any further collaboration contingent on a commitment by its supplier to full transparency and compliance with the food safety procedures applied to all products supplied to Danone. Danone won damages of €105 million from Fonterra.

=== Price fixing ===
In 2019 the Spanish regulator Comisión Nacional de los Mercados y la Competencia fined Danone 929,644 euros for forming a cartel with other dairy companies to avoid competition when buying milk from Spanish farmers between 2000 and 2013. In February 2024, the Spanish Audiencia Nacional annulled the fine as the statute of limitations has passed for Danone.

=== False advertising ===
In October 2025 it was discovered that Aqua, a bottled water brand from Danone in Indonesia, actually sources its water from drilled groundwater wells, contrary to its advertising claims of using mountain spring water. This revelation came to light during a surprise inspection by West Java Governor Dedi Mulyadi at Aqua's facility in the Subang Regency area. The news quickly went viral, prompting widespread shock and disapproval among netizens. In response, Danone released a statement asserting that Aqua water is safe for consumption.

== Gallery ==
Danone products

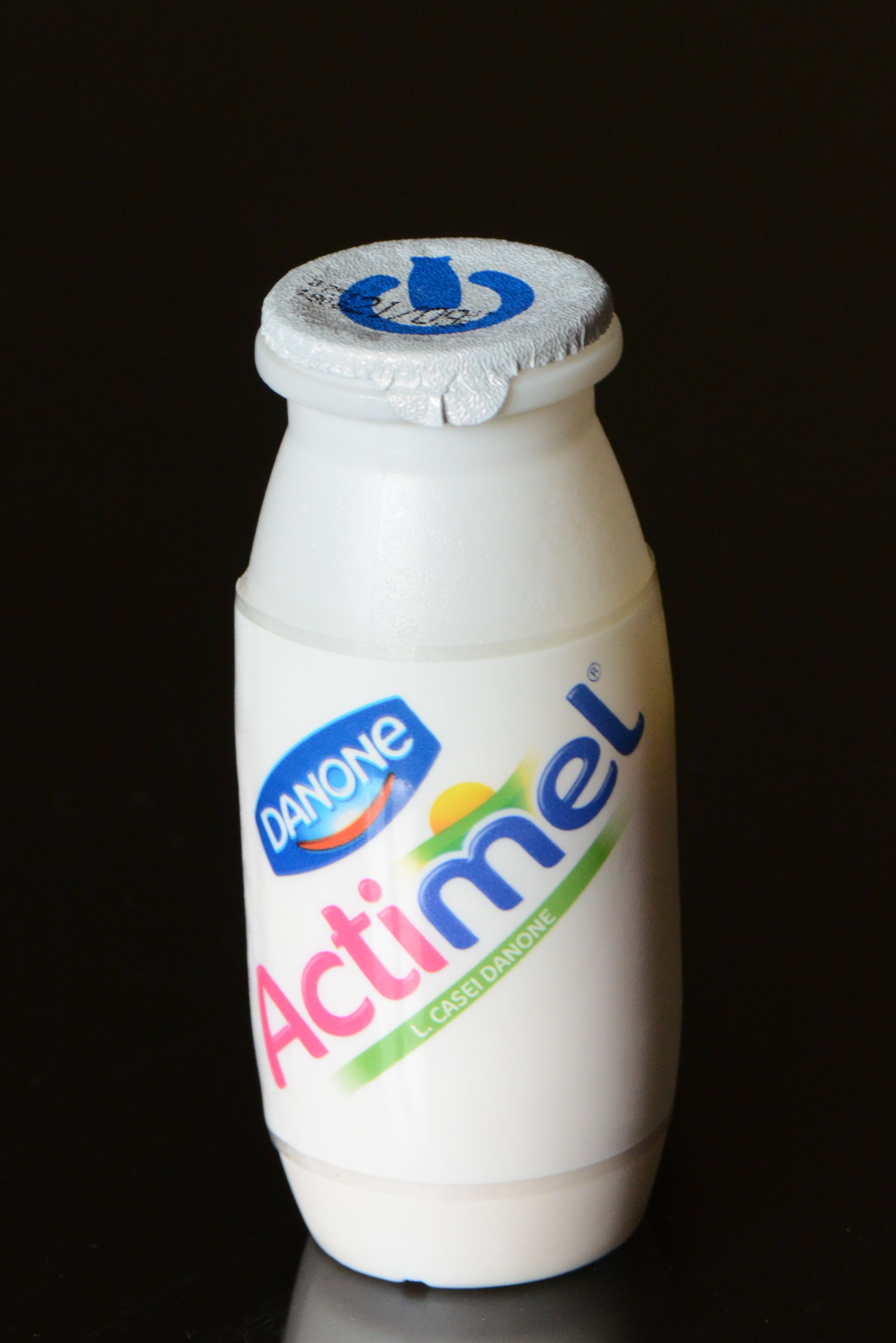
Actimel

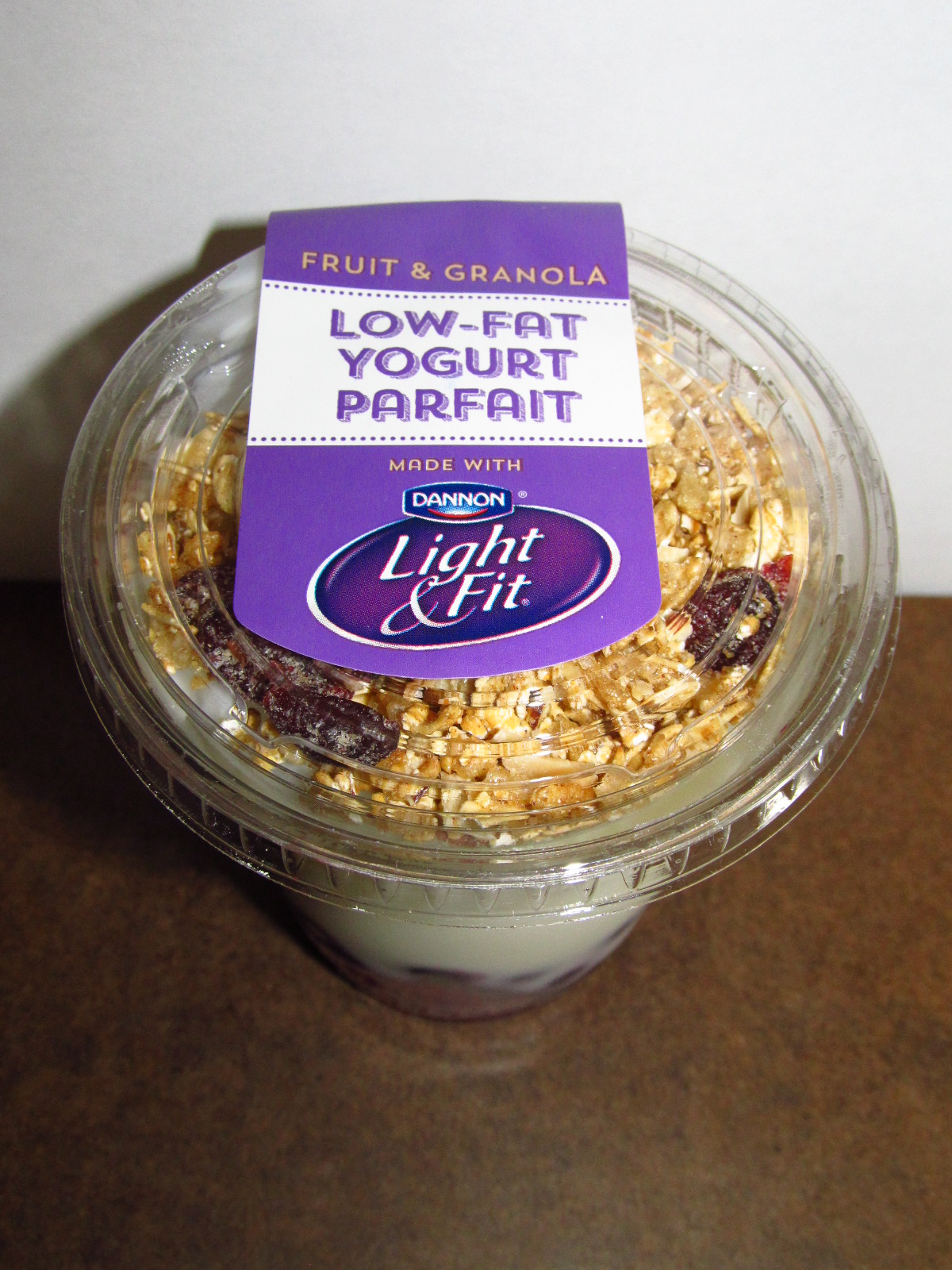
Yogurt parfait

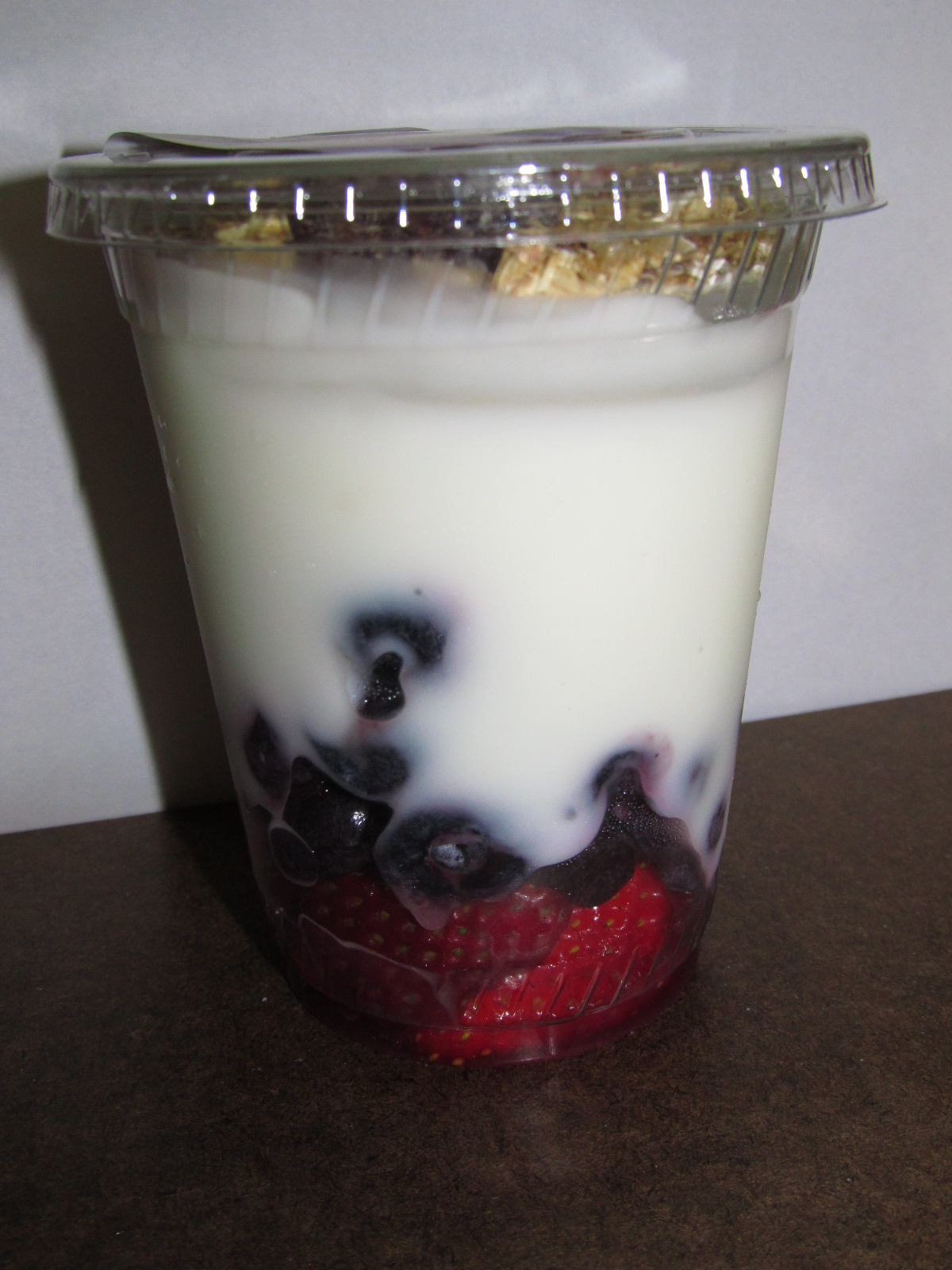
Yogurt parfait

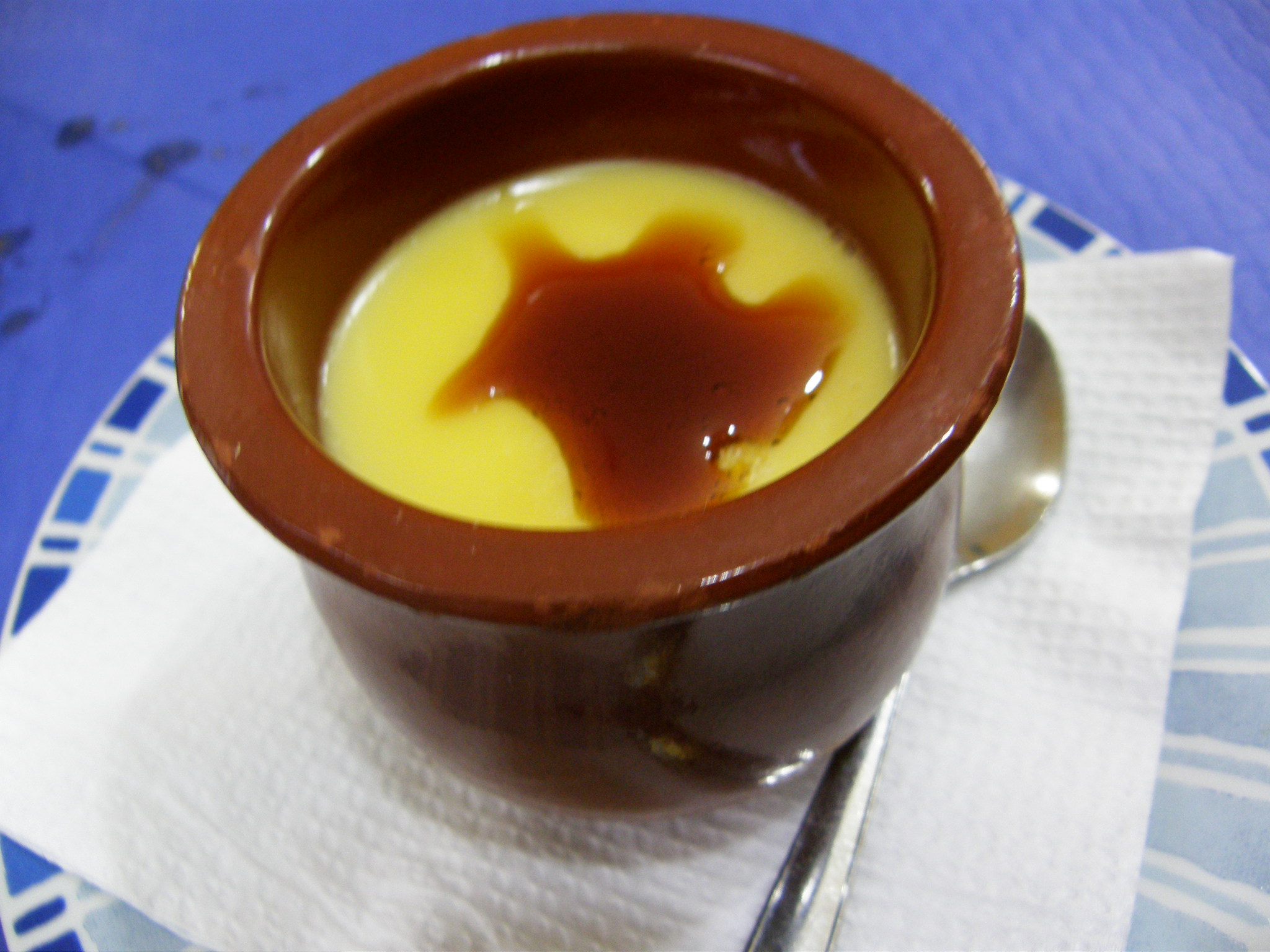
Natillas

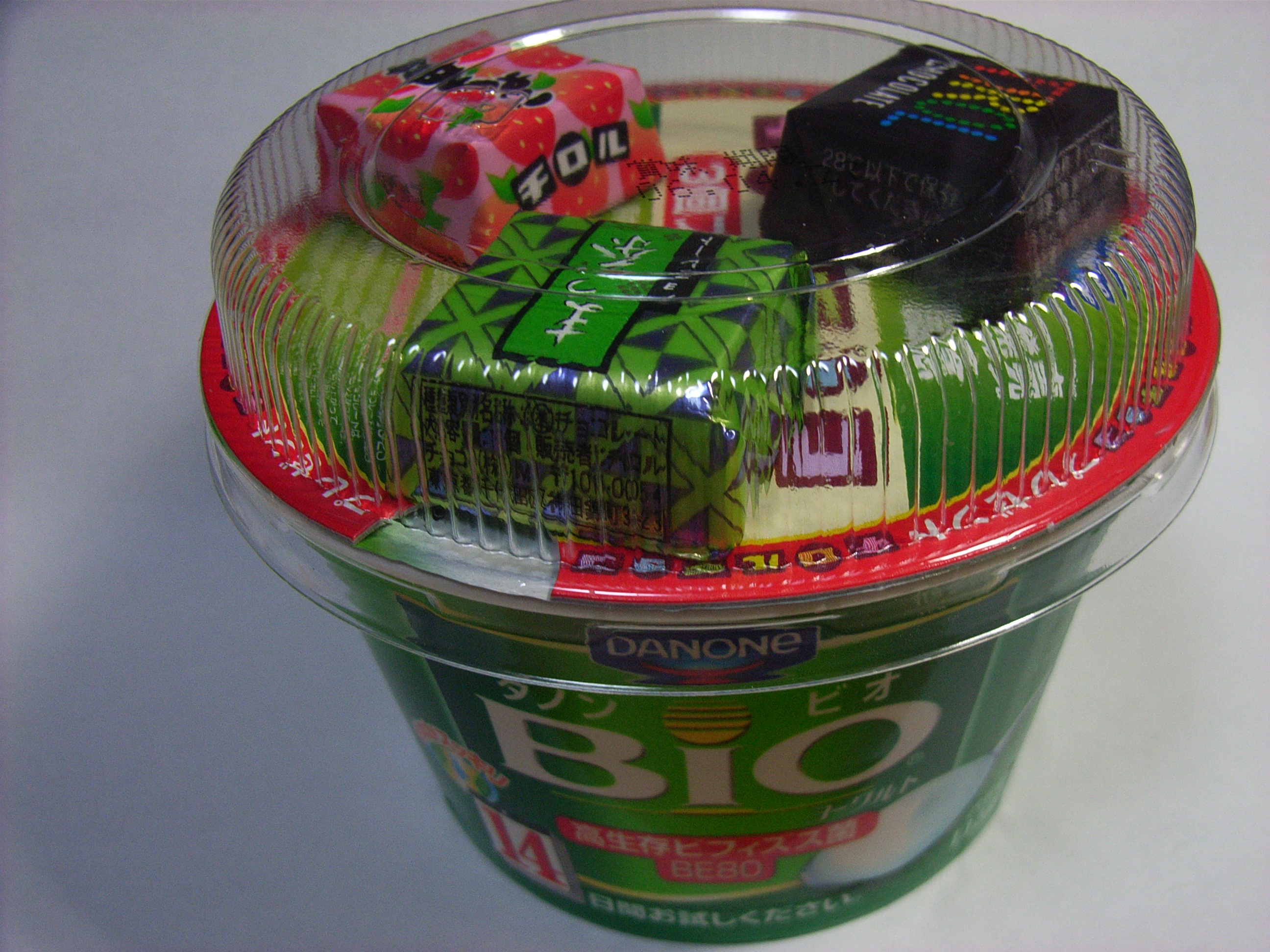
Yogurt with confections (Japan)

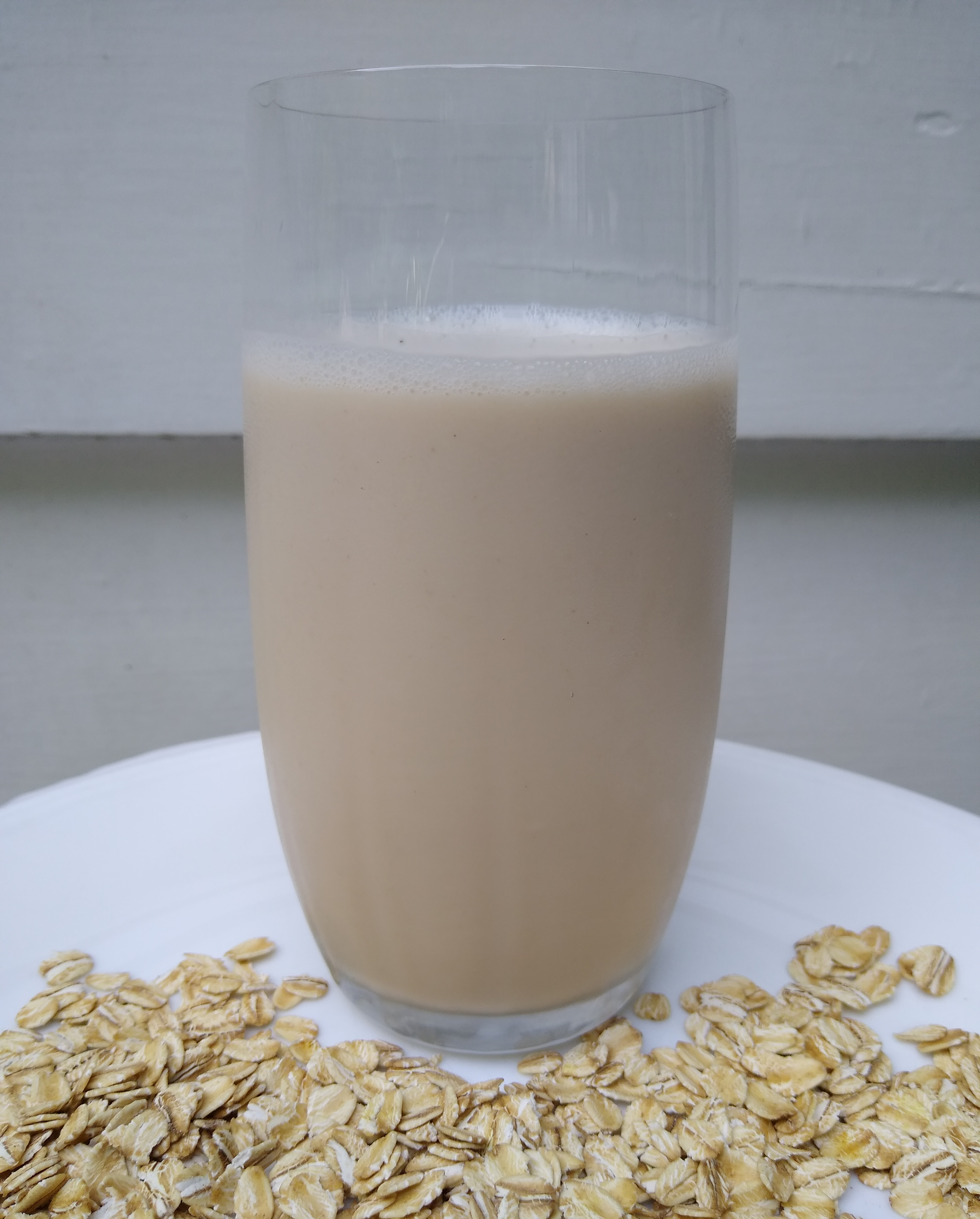
Silk oat milk

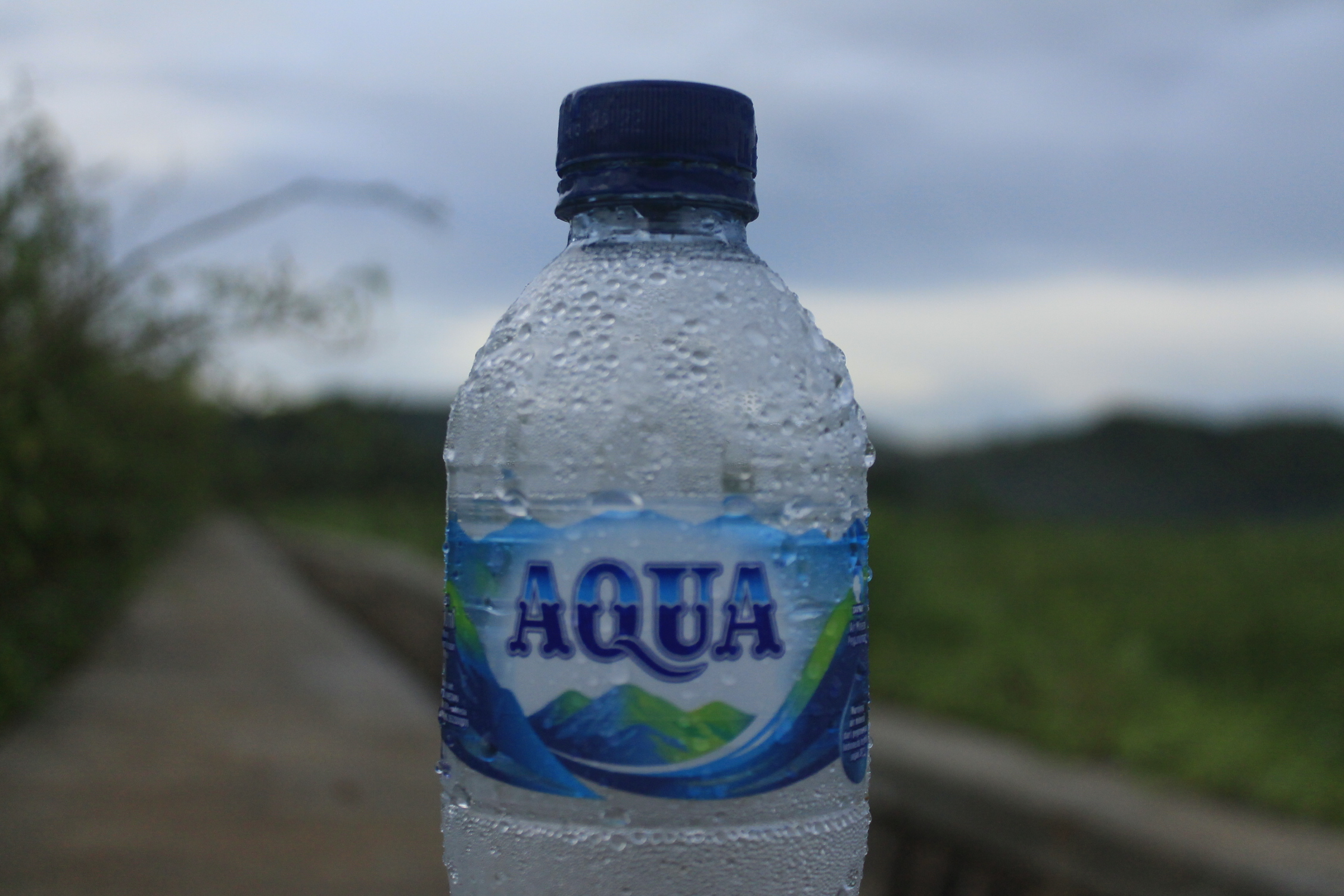
Aqua (Indonesia) bottled water

== See also ==
- Danone Nations Cup
