= Amanda Sourry =

British business executive (born 1963)

Judith Amanda Sourry (born 16 July 1963) is a Unilever senior executive, and a former Chairman of Unilever UK & Ireland.

== Early life ==
She was born Judith Amanda Knox in Northallerton, now the county town of North Yorkshire, then in the North Riding of Yorkshire.

She went to Dame Allan's School, Newcastle upon Tyne in Fenham.

She went to the University of Cambridge from 1981–85, gaining an MA in Modern and Medieval Languages (French, German and Italian). In her year abroad she went to the Loire Valley in France.

== Career ==
=== Unilever ===
She joined Unilever as a graduate trainee brand manager.

From May 2010 until June 2014 she was Chairman of Unilever UK & Ireland.

On 1 October 2015, she became Head of Unilever Foods (worldwide). At this point, she became the first female to be appointed to the main Unilever worldwide board (Unilever Leadership Executive).

== Personal life ==
She has lived in the UK, USA, Australia and Belgium. She is married and had children in 1994 and 1996.

== See also ==
- Fiona Kendrick, Chief Executive and Chairman of Nestlé UK & Ireland, since October 2012

Business positions
| Preceded by Antoine de Saint-Affrique | Head of Unilever Foods; October 2015 - | Succeeded by Incumbent |
| Preceded by | Chairman of Unilever UK & Ireland; May 2010 - June 2014 | Succeeded by Graeme Pitkethly |
