= Skeletons (trademark) =

Russian yogurt brand (2004–2008)

- Product type: Dairy products
- Current owner: Danone
- Country: Russia
- Introduced: 2004; 22 years ago
- Discontinued: 2008
- Markets: Russia, CIS, Germany and Czech Republic

Skeletons was a trademark of Russian yogurt (and later a whole range of dairy products) produced by the company Danone, sold in Russia in 2004–2008. Despite extensive advertising, large funding, originality and popularity among the population, Skeletons became one of the biggest commercial failures in the history of Russian marketing.

== Brand ==
Yogurt from the company Danone was aimed at children aged 9 to 14, who were beyond the target age of consumers of yogurt Rastishka. "Skeletons" were yogurts with candy under the lid that could be mixed together or eaten separately. The idea was borrowed from the Prince and Pokemon yogurts (which had been discontinued even earlier). The main characters of the Skeletons advertising campaign were a group of four teenage skeletons - DJ, Zhorik, Styuli, Basta and their pet turtle Raketa. In the commercials, they found themselves in situations that in real life happen to ordinary teenagers. Unlike the Rastishka yogurt, Skeletons appealed directly to children. The skeletonized teenagers emphasized the purpose of the yogurt (to strengthen the bones of those who eat it), and the product's slogan is: "Take care of your skeleton, children!".

The yogurt was launched in the fall of 2004 and immediately became quite popular, overtaking the sales of the yogurt Rastishka. Following the yogurt, glazed curds, drinking yogurts, curds with pieces of jelly and other products appeared. The characters of "Skeletons" began to appear on caps and stickers with text messages (e.g. "My phone rang, who's speaking? Skeleton!"). Based on these products, mobile games (DJ: Awesome Skate,"Treasures of Basta and Commotion in the Refrigerator), as well as one computer game (Skeletons. Rocket Theft) were created.

=== Reception ===
However, over time, the reception became mixed. According to the program Vesti, many parents claimed that the skeleton characters frighten their children, and that the packaging resembles bottles of poison. There were several appeals to the court and expert examinations, and the Russian Orthodox Church and NTV joined the protests against the yogurt. As a result, the expert commission on ethics of social advertising and socially significant information in the Northwestern Federal District recognized the campaign as harmful and traumatic to children's psyche.

To solve this problem, Danone had to release several advertisements for its parent, explaining the basic concept and proving the presence of beneficial substances.

Amid the accusations, the brand's popularity fell, but people still bought yogurt. In the fall of 2008, Danone removed Skeletons from Russian sales, as most consumers were attracted by the concept of Skeletons, not the products themselves. Thus, the Skeletons brand became one of the biggest commercial failures in the history of marketing in Russia.

=== Now ===
In the Czech Republic and Slovakia, Danone launched a similar yogurt called Kostíci before Skeletons closed. The concept of the main characters in the yogurt advert was slightly modified to avoid a similar marketing failure.
