= Kowloon Dairy =

Dairy producer in Hong Kong

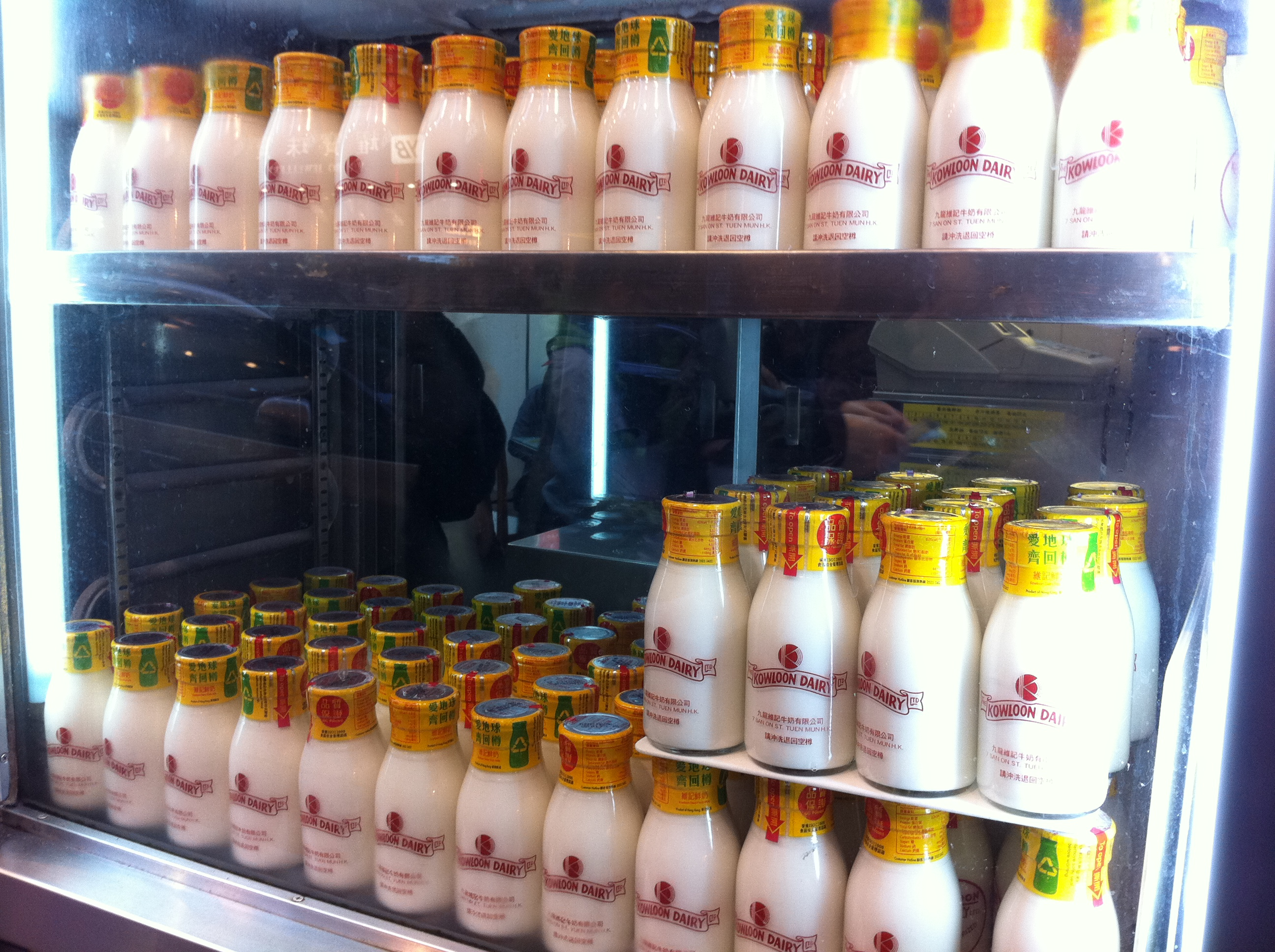
Kowloon Dairy milk

Kowloon Dairy Limited (traditional Chinese: 九龍維記牛奶; simplified Chinese: 九龙维记牛奶) is a dairy producer in Hong Kong. It was established by George Ahwee and Rudy Choy in 1940.

== History ==
The Kowloon Dairy was incorporated on 21 March 1940. Initially there were only 30 employees and the company could only supply fresh milk to the northern part of the Kowloon Peninsula. The company expanded following additional investment by Li Lan Sang, prominent racehorse owner and member of the influential Li family banking dynasty in Hong Kong. During World War II, the company had 100 cows imported from Australia

In the early years, the Kowloon Dairy Limited's factory was located where the Choi Wan Estate is presently situated. In 1972, the Hong Kong government decided to reclaim the land in order to build public estates for its citizens and Kowloon Dairy decided to move its factory to Tuen Mun and the Farm to Yuen Long. The farm expanded to 21,000 square foot with more than 300 cows.

Since about 1975, the Kowloon Dairy’s operation and business are managed by the family of Li Lan Sang.

In 2013, there were almost 500 employees working for the Kowloon Dairy Limited, with distribution across Hong Kong and Macau. At that time the company was producing different varieties of dairy products, including milk and ice cream. In 1992, Kowloon Dairy Limited entered the Chinese market and formed a joint company named the Kowloon Dairy (Guangzhou) Limited with local dairy company Fengxing Milk. Production in China started in 1994; now, dairy products from Kowloon Dairy Limited can be found in Guangdong, Hainan, Fujian, Heilongjiang and Yunnan.

The Southern Metropolis Daily said of Kowloon Dairy, "many Hong Kong people drink it from childhood to adulthood and are loyal fans of it".

== Award ==
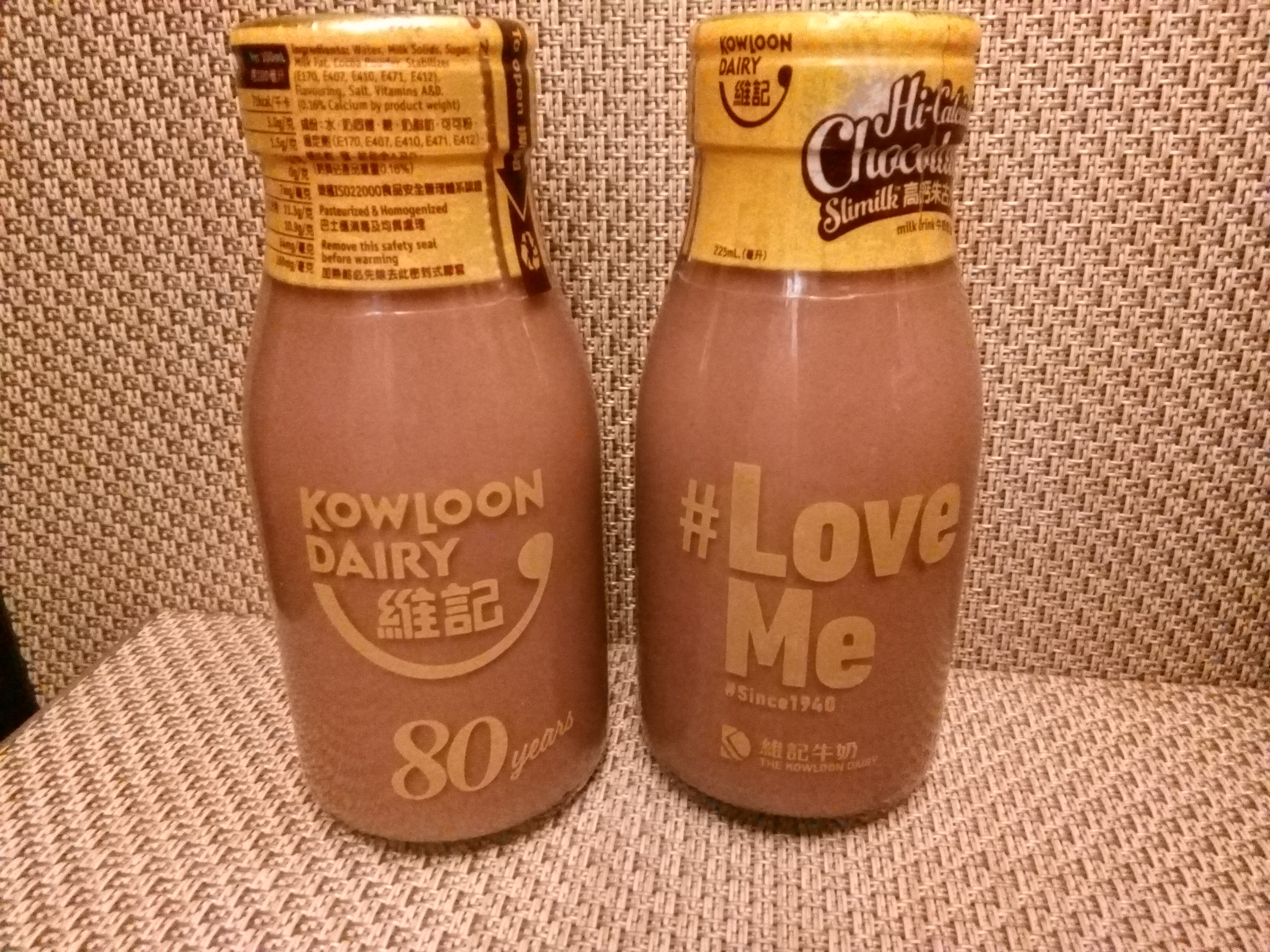
Chocolate milk in anniversary bottles, 2020

In January 2007 and 2009, Kowloon Dairy Limited was awarded certification from HACCP Food Safety Management and the ISO 22000 Certification by the British Standards Institution. This was the first time a Hong Kong Dairy Product company was recognized and awarded. Furthermore, in September 2011, Kowloon Dairy Limited was granted HACCP Food Safety Management and ISO 22000 Certification from the SGS.

== See also ==
- Dairy Farm International Holdings Limited
- List of food companies
- Trappist Dairy
- The Garden Company
- Manufacturing in Hong Kong
