= Panzani =

French pasta brand

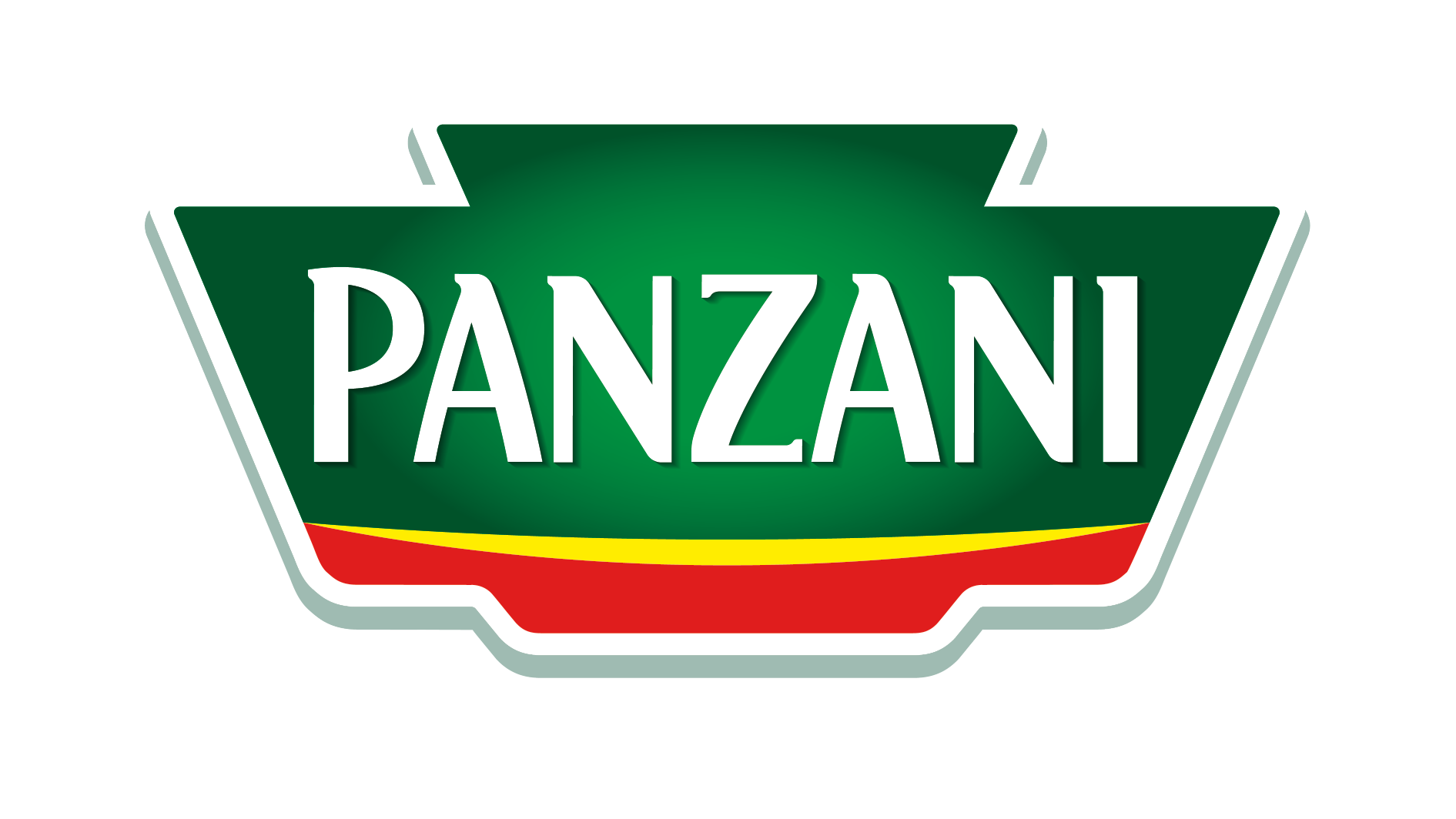
- Industry: Food
- Founded: 1950
- Headquarters: Lyon, France
- Revenue: €578 million (2019)
- Net income: €48 million (2019)
- Number of employees: 745
- Website: www.panzani.com

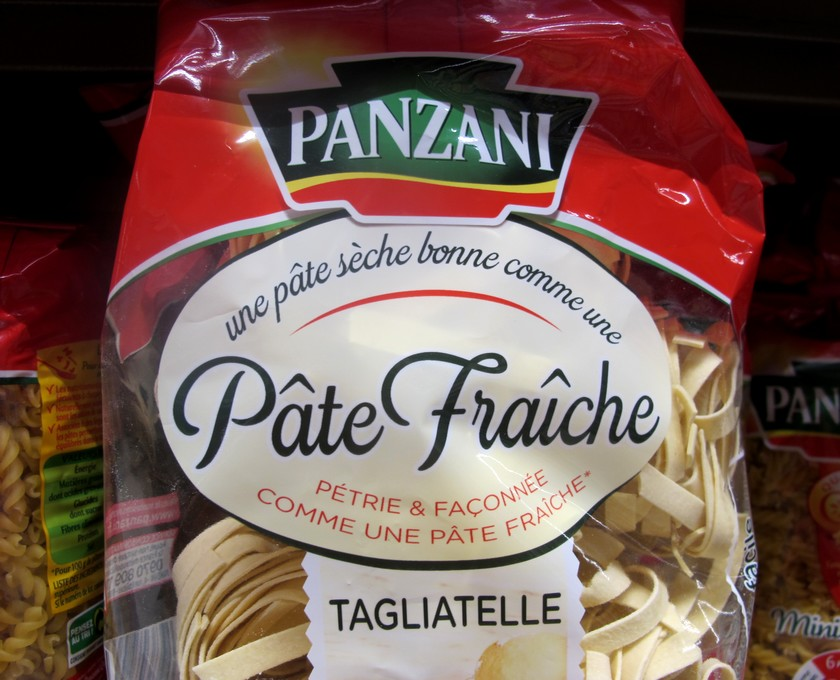

Panzani is a French brand of pasta. Since 2021, it has been owned by CVC Capital Partners. Since Tuesday, October 20, 2026, the Portuguese manufacturer Cerealis — owner of the brands Nacional, Milaneza, and Napolitania — has been in negotiations to acquire the French pasta manufacturer Panzani, following its successful acquisition of the Spanish group Cerealto.

== Overview ==
The brand was started by Jean Panzani in Parthenay in 1950. In the 1950s, he sold pasta in cellophane whereas other companies used cardboard. From 1960 to 1964, it merged with La Lune and Régia Scaramelli. It was in the 1960s that it became the market leader in pasta wholesalers in France. In 1964, Roland Barthes analysed a commercial by Panzani in his essay entitled 'The Rhetoric of the Image', suggesting Panzani was trying to come across as Italian.

In 1973, it was bought by Groupe Danone. Its TV commercials featured André Aubert as Don Patillo, a namesake for Don Camillo, made famous by Fernandel.

In 1997, it was bought by Paribas Affaires Industrielles. In 2002, it bought Lustucru, another French brand of pasta.

In April 2005, it was bought by Ebro Foods.

In 2013, a horse meat fraud was discovered in Panzani ravioli produced by William Saurin.

At the end of 2021, it was acquired by CVC Capital Partners.
