= Fengxing Milk =

Chinese dairy company

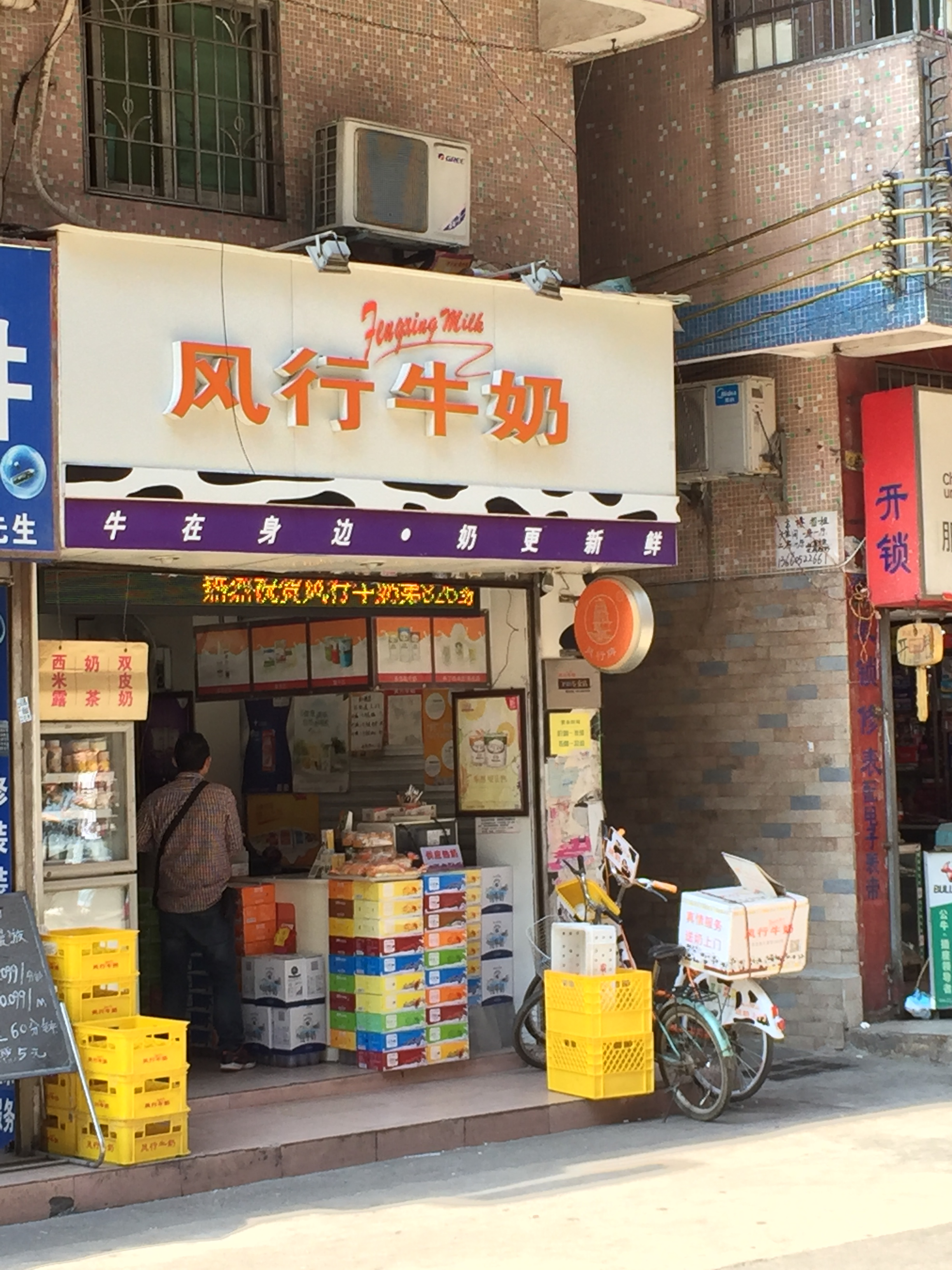
A Fengxing Milk store in Guangzhou(2016)

Fengxing Milk Co. (simplified Chinese: 风行牛奶; traditional Chinese: 風行牛奶; Jyutping: Fung1hang4 Ngau4naai5) is a Chinese dairy company located in Guangzhou, Guangdong Province. The company was established in 1952, with roots dating back to 1926, and is the first dairy company in the city. Fengxing owns numerous dairy farms in Guangzhou and produces milk supplied to schools across Guangdong province.

== History ==
- In 1927, the company started as Sheng Kee Dairy (勝記牛奶公司).
- In 1952, Fengxing Condensed Milk Factory was established.
- In 1968, it had the largest dairy farm in southern China, combining the Sheng Kee Dairy.
- In 1984, the company signs contract with Hong Kong's Kowloon Dairy, continuously providing milk to Hong Kong from that year. A joint venture company between the two companies, Kowloon Dairy (Guangzhou) Limited, is launched in 1994.
- In 1987, it helped to set up a joint venture with Danone, which was later sold to Bright Dairy.
- In 2020, the company was acquired by Yuexiu Holdings, and gained Five Rams Ice Cream assets from Nestlé one year later.

== Products ==
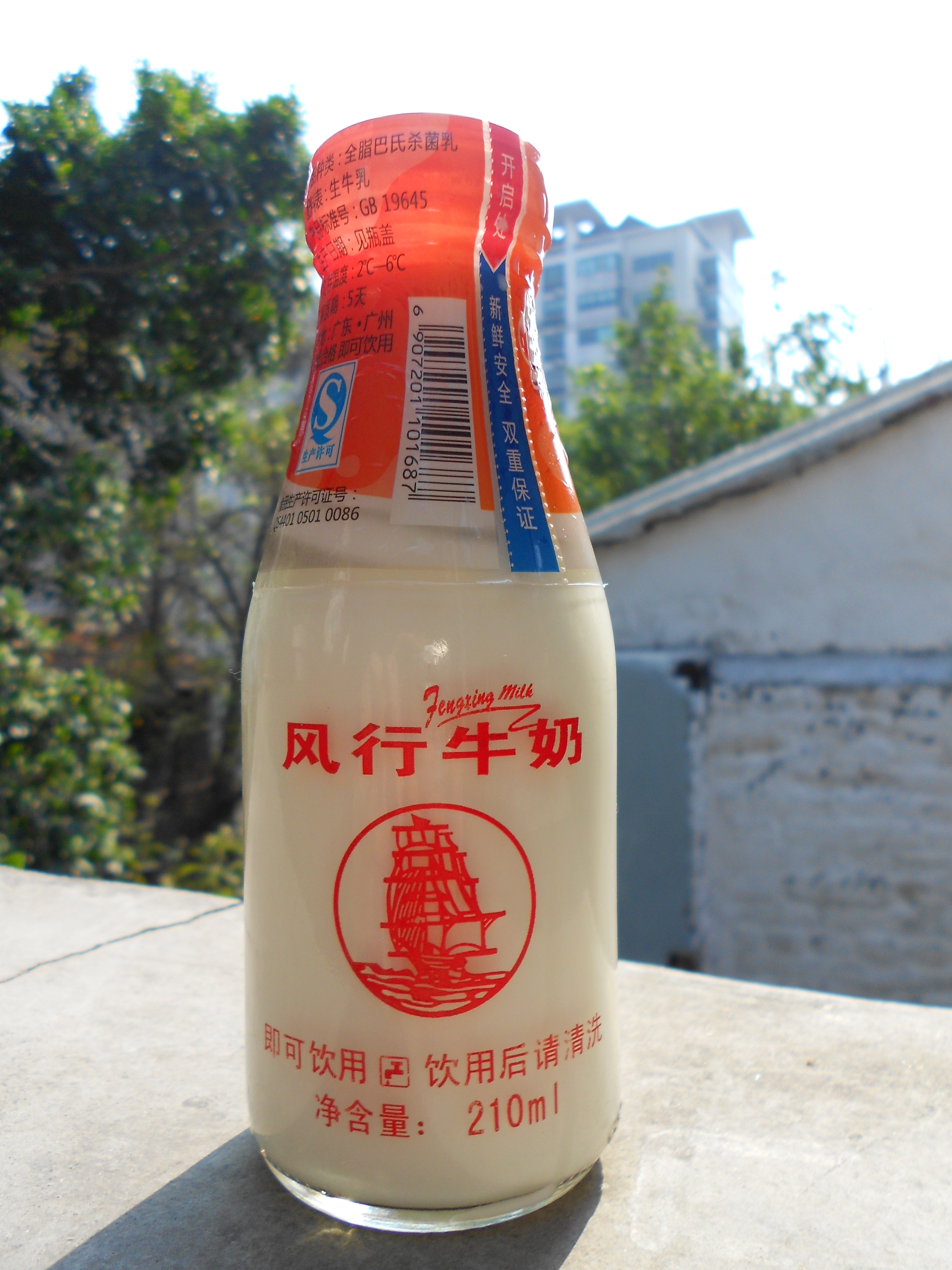
Pasteurized milk

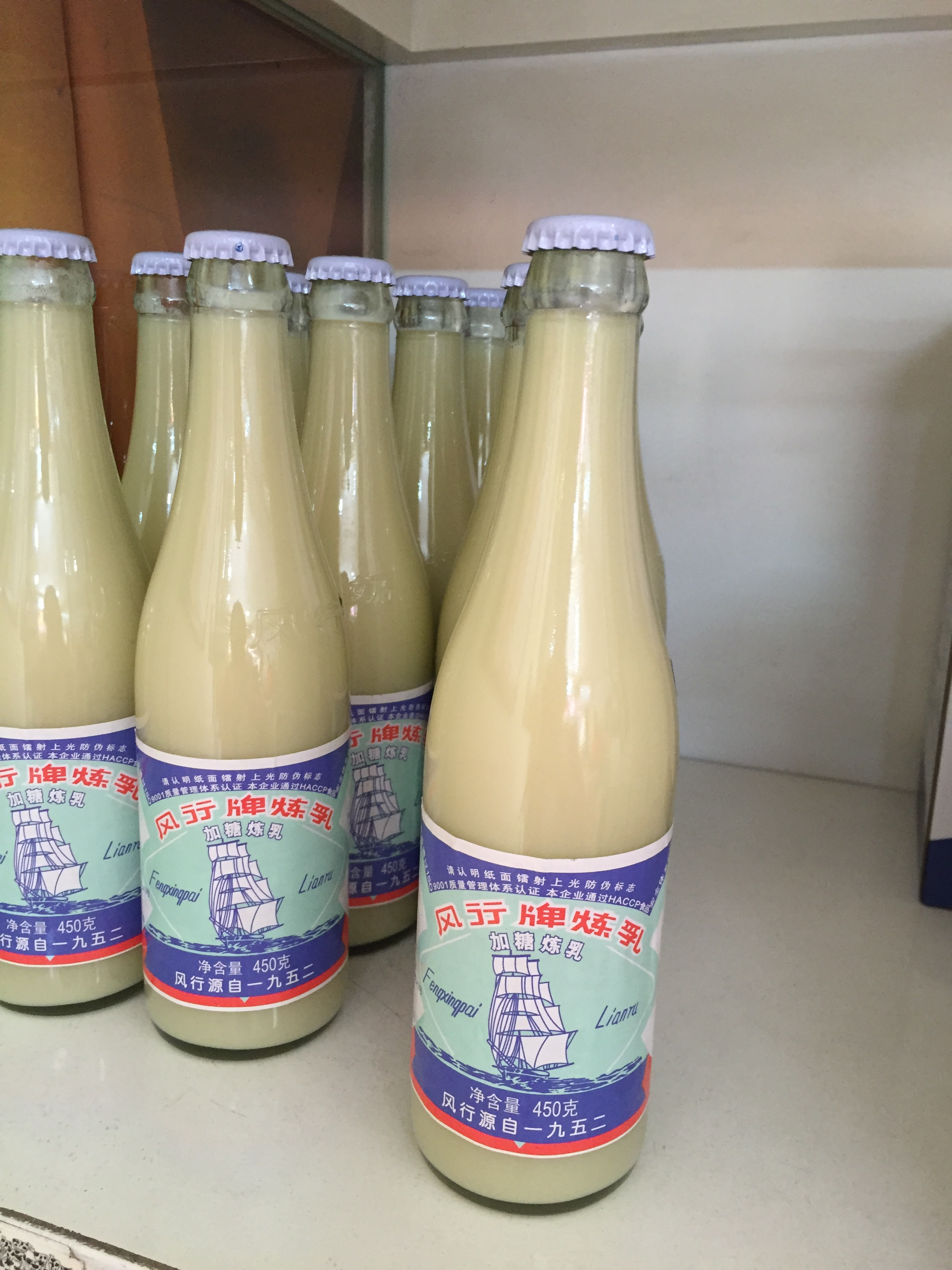
Condensed milk

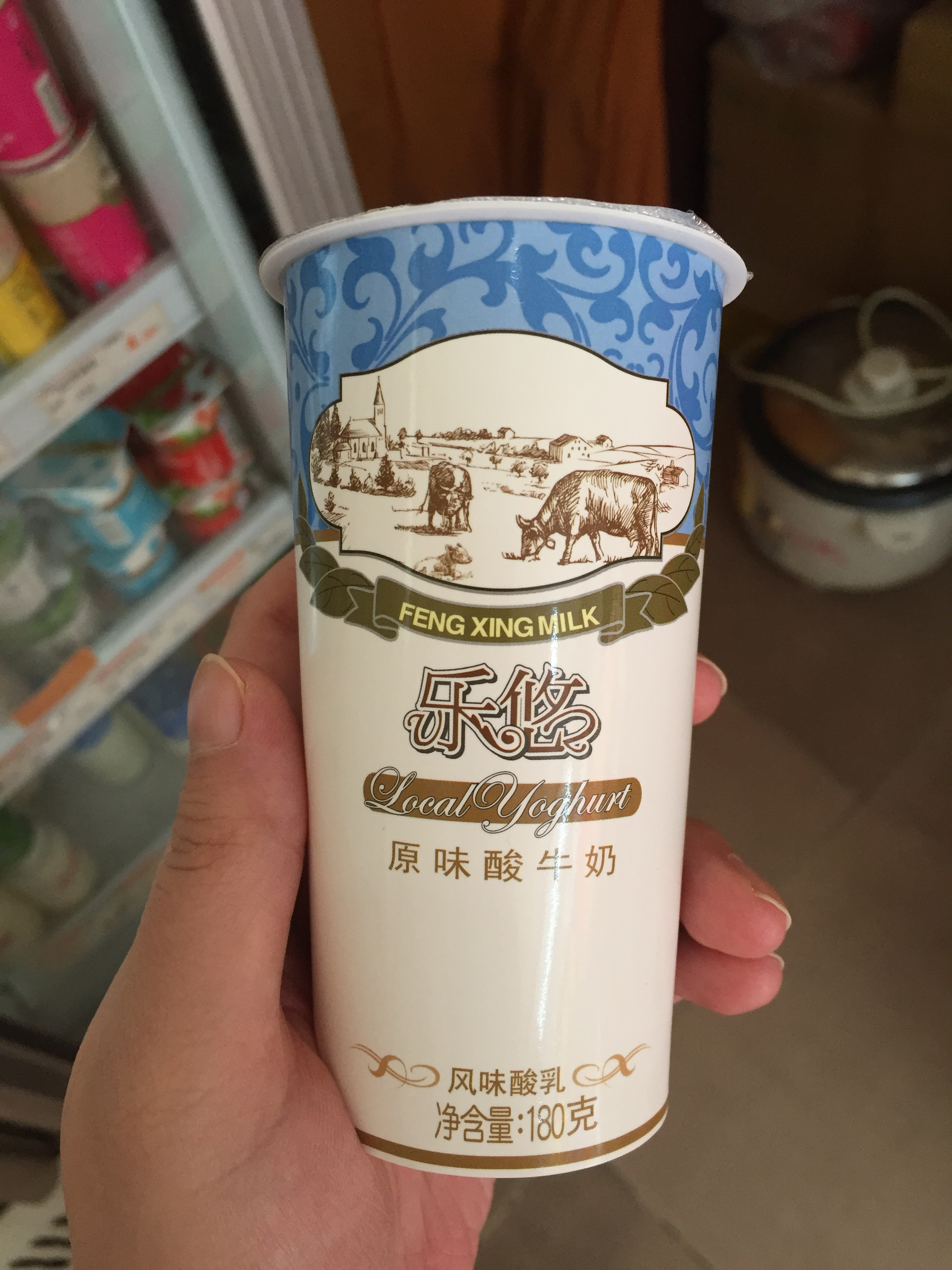
Yoghurt

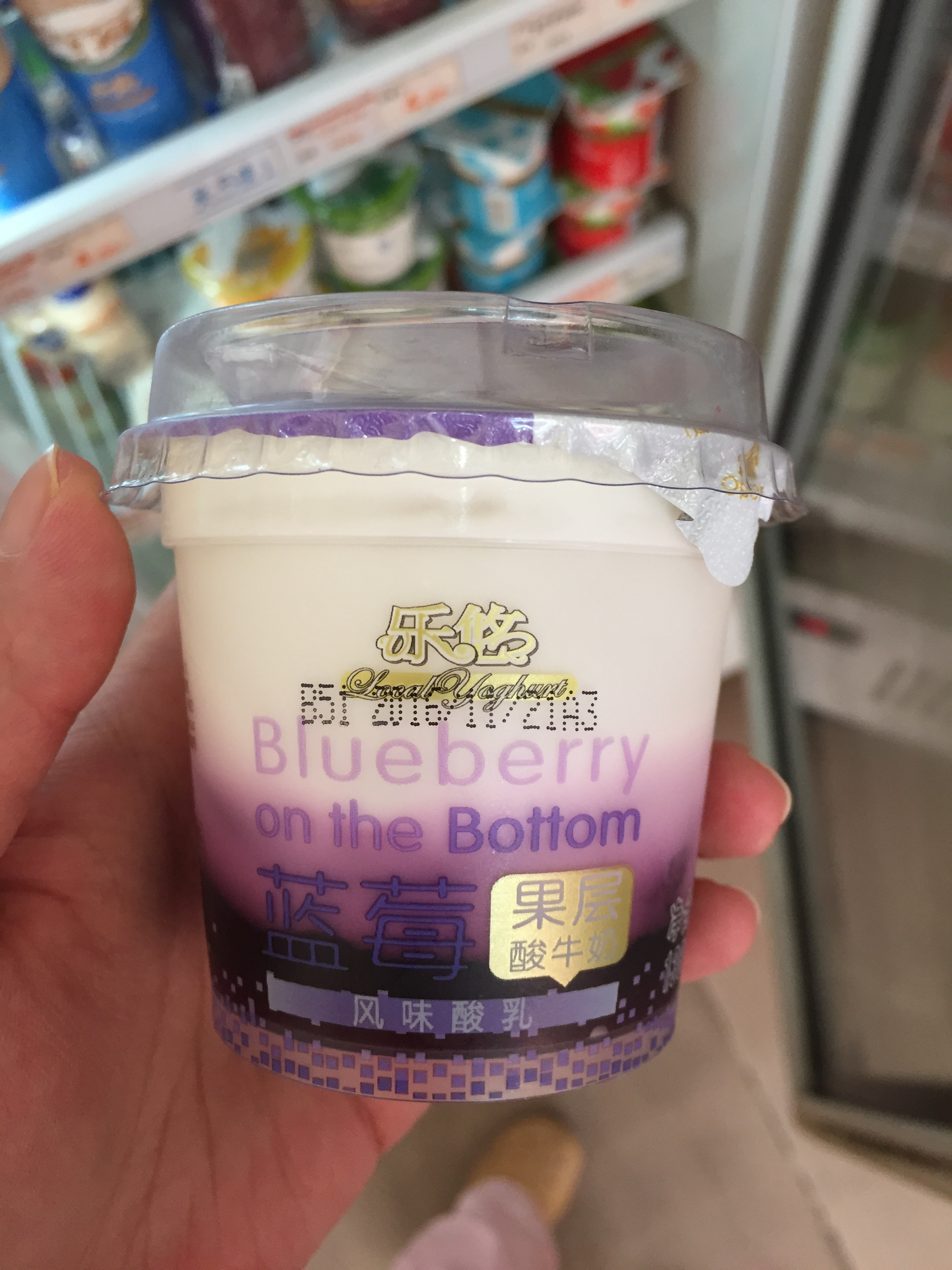
Yoghurt
