= Gilles Schnepp =

French corporate senior executive (born 1958)

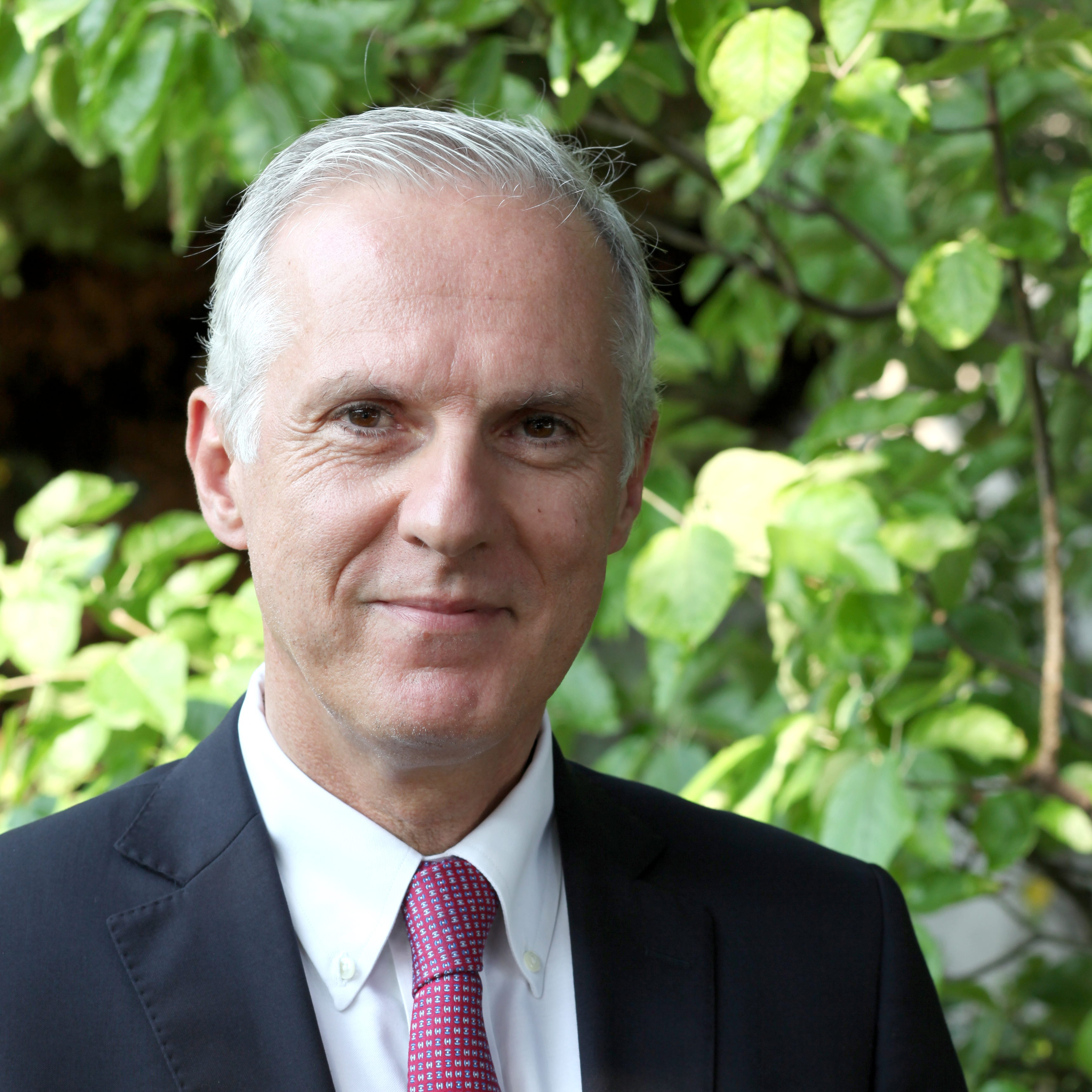
- Schnepp in 2015
- Born: 16 October 1958 (age 67); Lyon, France
- Education: HEC Paris
- Occupation: Business executive
- Known for: Former CEO of Legrand
- Spouse: Blandine Favre-Gilly
- Children: 3
- Awards: Legion of Honour

Gilles Schnepp (born 16 October 1958 in Lyon, France) is a French business executive. He was the Chairman and chief executive officer of the Legrand Group between March 2006 and February 2018, and then chairman until 2020.

In March 2021, he was appointed chairman of Danone's board of directors.

== Career ==
Having graduated from HEC Paris in 1981, Gilles Schnepp began his career in 1983 at Merrill Lynch France. He was appointed vice president in 1986 and senior vice president in 1989.

He left the world of finance in 1989 to join Legrand. Having served as deputy chief financial officer and later as CFO, he became vice-chairman and chief executive officer of Legrand in 2004, succeeding François Granite. In 2006, he took on the role of chairman and CEO. Schnepp continued to develop the company by increasing the number of takeovers and enabled Legrand to re-enter the CAC 40 in 2011.

In 2015, 2016 and 2017, Schnepp was ranked among the top 100 CEOs by Harvard Business Review.

In 2018, he handed over part of the management of the Legrand Group to Benoît Coquart, while retaining the position of chairman of the board of directors.

He stepped down as chairman of the company in July 2020, but remained a member of the Strategy and Corporate Responsibility Committee.

In December that year, he joined the board of directors of the Danone Group and was appointed Chairman on 14 March 2021.

Since 2020, he has been an operating advisor for Clayton, Dubilier & Rice.

== Other positions ==
- Member of the board of directors of Saint-Gobain since June 2009.
- Member of the board of Sanofi since 2020.
- Chairman of the Fédération des Industries Electriques, Electroniques et de Communication (FIEEC) between July 2013 and 2019.
- Chairman of Medef’s Ecological and Economic Transition Commission and a member of the executive council from 2018 to 2021.
- Vice-chairman and member of the supervisory board of Peugeot S.A between April 2019 and December 2020.

== Recognition ==
In 2007, Gilles Schnepp was awarded France's Legion of Honour, receiving the title of Chevalier de la Légion d’honneur. In 2012, he received the title of officer in the French National Order of Merit (France).

== Personal life ==
Gilles Schnepp is married to Blandine Favre-Gilly, a psychologist, and has three children: Paul, Adrien, and Marie. He enjoys playing tennis.

== Income ==
In 2009, Gilles Schnepp's income of one million euros was ranked 75th among the main French senior executives.
