= William Saurin (French food company) =

William Saurin Production is a French food processing company founded in 1898, specializing in the production of ready meals.

The William Saurin brand has been owned by Financière Cofigeo and the Arterris cooperative since 2017.

== History ==
In 1898, William Saurin (1872–1937) opened a grocery store in Saint-Mandé, a suburb of Paris. The company expanded rapidly by using appertization (named after the inventor of food canning, Nicolas Appert) for the production of canned stews and jams.

In 2016, the death of founder and CEO Monique Piffaut brought to light a massive accounting fraud, triggering a race against time to prevent the liquidation of 21 industrial sites and the layoff of 3,000 employees.

On June 12, 2017, the William Saurin company was placed in receivership. On October 3, 2017, the sale plan was implemented.
