= Antoine Bernard de Saint-Affrique =

French businessman (born 1964)

- Born: 26 December 1964 (age 61); Boulogne-Billancourt, France
- Education: ESSEC, Harvard Business School
- Occupation: CEO of Danone

Antoine Bernard de Saint-Affrique is a French businessman. He was appointed CEO of the Danone group in May 2021. His family name is Bernard de Saint-Affrique, sometimes abbreviated to de Saint-Affrique, and his given name is Antoine.

== Family name origin ==
His ancestor Louis Bernard, born in Valleraugue in 1771 and the son of a protestant pastor, held positions in the military administration under the First French Empire: he was military intendant of the guard of the Kingdom of Naples in 1806, and inspector of reviews in 1815. He was made Baron of the Empire by Joseph Bonaparte, King of Naples, in 1807, and this title was confirmed under the Bourbon Restauration in 1819 and 1821. He was authorized in 1819 to "regularly join to his name that of "de Saint-Affrique".

== Life ==
=== Youth ===
Antoine de Saint-Affrique was born in December 1964. He graduated from the ESSEC business school. In 1987-1988, he did his military service in the French Navy, of which he became a Reserve Officer.

=== Career ===
Most of his career was spent at Unilever, where he held various marketing positions from 1989 to 1997. One of his first assignments was to increase sales of Sanogyl and Signal toothpaste brands.

He then spent three years at Danone, where he was marketing director of Liebig Maille-Amora.

Back at Unilever from 2000 to 2003, he was European Director of the sauces and condiments business, then from 2003 to 2005 the CEO of the Unilever subsidiary covering Hungary, Croatia and Slovenia.

In 2005 he was appointed Vice President of the Unilever Group, member of the Executive Committee for Europe and responsible for all of the Group's activities in Eastern Europe. In 2009 he was appointed Executive Vice President of Unilever and in 2011 President of Unilever's food business. These various positions led him to reside in the Netherlands and then in England, where Unilever's offices and headquarters are located.

In 2015, he was appointed chairman and CEO of Barry Callebaut, Europe's leading cocoa processor and chocolate manufacturer. During his tenure, the Swiss chocolate maker's share price almost doubled, a success he attributes to Barry Callebaut's strategy of sustainability.

In May 2021, he was appointed Chief Executive Officer of the Danone Group, effective in September 2021.

=== Other responsibilities ===
Antoine Bernard de Saint-Affrique is an independent director of Essilor International. He is also a member of the Board of Directors of Burberry Group Plc and the Swiss-American Chamber of Commerce.

== Family ==
Antoine Bernard de Saint-Affrique is married to Carole and has four children.

== Compensation ==
In 2021, as the CEO and member of the executive committee of Barry Callebaut AG, the total compensation of Antoine Bernard de Saint-Affrique was $7 million.
