= History of the Jews in the Ottoman Empire =

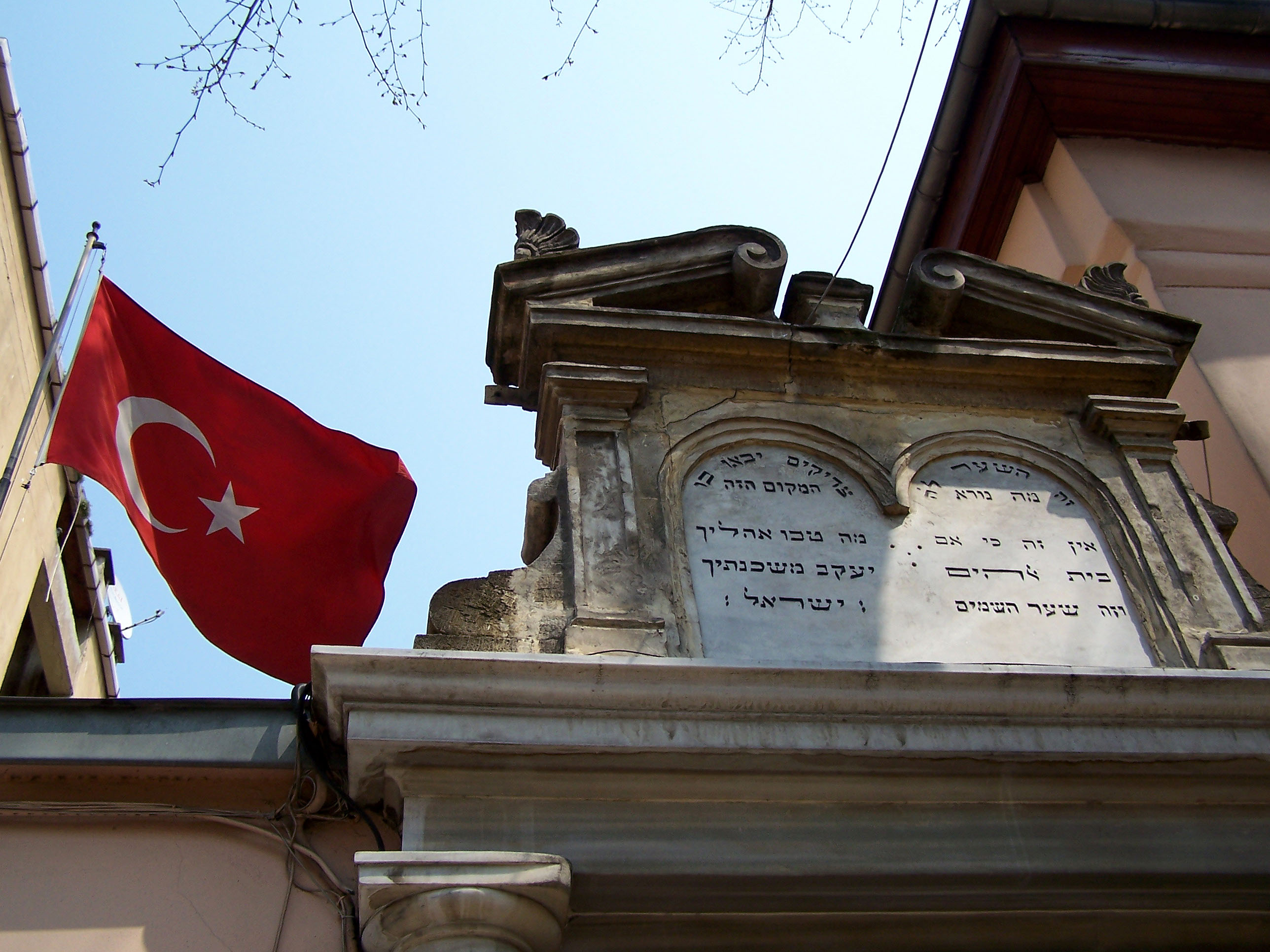
Bet Yaakov Synagogue was built in 1878 at the Kuzguncuk district of Istanbul

By the time the Ottoman Empire rose to power in the 14th and 15th centuries, Jewish communities had been established throughout the region. The Ottoman Empire lasted from the early 14th century until the end of World War I and covered parts of Southeastern Europe, Anatolia, and much of the Middle East. The experience of Jews in the Ottoman Empire is particularly significant because the region "provided a principal place of refuge for Jews driven out of Western Europe by massacres and persecution," according to Tahir Kamran.

Jews and Christians were considered dhimmi by the majority-Muslim population of the Ottoman Empire. Muslims in the Ottoman Empire used the Qur'anic concept of dhimmi to place certain restrictions on Jews living in the region. For example, some of the restrictions placed on Jews in the Ottoman Empire were, but not limited to, a special tax, a requirement to wear special clothing, and a ban on carrying guns, riding horses, building or repairing places of worship, and having public processions or public worship.

At the time of the Ottoman conquests, Anatolia had already been home to communities of Byzantine Jews. The Ottoman Empire became a haven for Jews fleeing persecution in the Iberian Peninsula following the Alhambra Decree. By the end of the 16th century, the Ottoman Empire had the largest Jewish population in the world, with 150,000 compared to Poland's and non-Ottoman Ukraine's combined figure of 75,000.

The First and Second Aliyahs brought an increased Jewish presence to Ottoman Palestine. The Ottoman successor state of modern Turkey continues to be home to a small Jewish population today.

== Overview ==
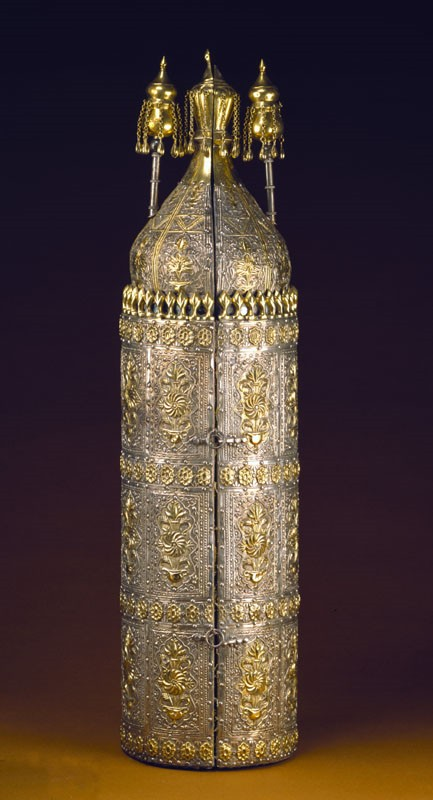
Jewish leader Abraham Salomon Camondo's silver Torah case, Constantinople, 1860 – Musée d'Art et d'Histoire du Judaïsme

At the time of the Battle of Yarmuk, on 15–20 August 636, when the Levant passed into Muslim rule, thirty Jewish communities existed in Haifa, Shechem, Hebron, Ramla, Gaza, Jerusalem, as well as many other cities. Safed became a spiritual centre for Jews, and the Shulchan Aruch was compiled there, as were many Kabbalistic texts.

In addition to the already existent Jewish population in the lands the Ottomans conquered, many more Jews were given refuge after the expulsion of Jews from Spain under the reign of Bayezid II. Although the reported positive status of the Jews in the Ottoman Empire may have been exaggerated, it is undeniable that some tolerance was enjoyed. Under the millet system, non-Muslims were organized as autonomous communities based on religion (e.g., the Orthodox millet, Armenian millet, etc.). Within the framework of the millet, Jews had considerable administrative autonomy and were represented by the Hakham Bashi, the Turkish term for "Chief Rabbi". There were no restrictions in the professions Jews could practice, in contrast to the extensive restrictions common in Western Christian countries. There were restrictions, however, regarding the areas Jews could live in or work, which were similar to the restrictions placed on Ottoman subjects of other religions. Like all non-Muslims, Jews had to pay the haraç ("head tax") and faced other restrictions in clothing, horse riding, army service, slave ownership, etc. Although many of these restrictions were decreed, they were not always enforced. Jizya collected from Christian and Jewish communities was among the main sources of tax income of the Ottoman treasury.

Some Jews who reached high positions in the Ottoman court and administration include Mehmed II's minister of finance (Defterdar) Hekim Yakup Pasha; his Portuguese physician, Moses Hamon; Murad II's physician, Ishak Pasha; and Abraham de Castro, who was the master of the mint in Egypt.

== Classical Ottoman period (1300–1600) ==
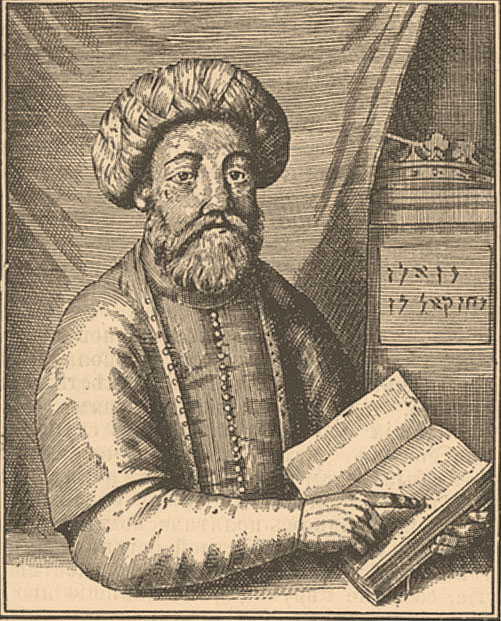
Illustration of Sabbatai Tzvi from 1906 (Joods Historisch Museum)

The first Jewish synagogue linked to Ottoman rule is Etz ha-Hayyim (Hebrew: עץ החיים) in Bursa which passed to Ottoman authority in 1324. The synagogue is still in use, although the modern Jewish population of Bursa has shrunk to about 140 people.

During the Classical Ottoman period, the Jews, together with most other communities of the empire, enjoyed a certain level of prosperity. Compared with other Ottoman subjects, they were the predominant power in commerce and trade as well as diplomacy and other high offices. In the 16th century especially, the Jews rose to prominence under the millets, the apogee of Jewish influence could arguable be the appointment of Joseph Nasi to Sanjak-bey (governor, a rank usually only bestowed upon Muslims) of the island of Naxos. Also in the first half of the 17th century, the Jews were distinct in winning tax farms. Haim Gerber describes it as: "My impression is that no pressure existed, that it was merely performance that counted."

An additional problem was the lack of unity among the Jews themselves. They had come to the Ottoman Empire from many lands, bringing with them their own customs and opinions, to which they clung tenaciously, and had founded separate congregations. Another tremendous upheaval was caused when Sabbatai Zevi proclaimed himself to be the Messiah. He was eventually caught by the Ottoman authorities and when given the choice between death and conversion, he opted for the latter. His remaining disciples also converted to Islam. Their descendants are today known as Donmeh.

=== Resettlement of the Romaniotes ===
Paths of Jewish immigration to Salonika

The first major event in Jewish history under Ottoman rule took place after the Empire gained control over Constantinople. After Sultan Mehmed II's conquest of Constantinople, he found the city in a state of disarray. After suffering many sieges, a devastating conquest by Catholic Crusaders in 1204, and the outbreak of the Black Death in 1347, the city was a shadow of its former glory. As Mehmed wanted the city as his new capital, he decreed the rebuilding of the city. And in order to revivify Constantinople he ordered that Muslims, Christians and Jews from all over his empire be resettled in the new capital. Within months most of the Empire's Romaniote Jews, from the Balkans and Anatolia, were concentrated in Constantinople, where they made up 10% of the city's population. But at the same time the forced resettlement, though not intended as an anti-Jewish measure, was perceived as an "expulsion" by the Jews. Despite this interpretation however, the Romaniotes would be the most influential community in the Empire for several decades, until that position would be lost to a wave of new Jewish arrivals.

=== Influx of Sephardic Jews from Iberia ===
The number of native Jews was soon bolstered by small groups of Ashkenazi Jews that immigrated to the Ottoman Empire between 1421 and 1453. Among these new Ashkenazi immigrants was Rabbi Yitzhak Sarfati (Hebrew: צרפתי, lit. 'French'), a German-born Jew whose family had lived in France. He became the Chief Rabbi of Edirne and wrote a letter inviting the European Jewry to settle in the Ottoman Empire, in which he stated "Turkey is a land wherein nothing is lacking" and asked "Is it not better for you to live under Muslims than under Christians?" Many had taken the Rabbi up on his offer, including the Jews who were expelled from the German Duchy of Bavaria by Louis IX, Duke of Bavaria in 1470. Even before then, as the Ottomans conquered Anatolia and Greece, they encouraged Jewish immigration from the European lands from which they were expelled. The Ashkenazi Jews mixed with the already large Romaniot Jewish communities that had become part of the Ottoman Empire as they had conquered lands from the Byzantine Empire.

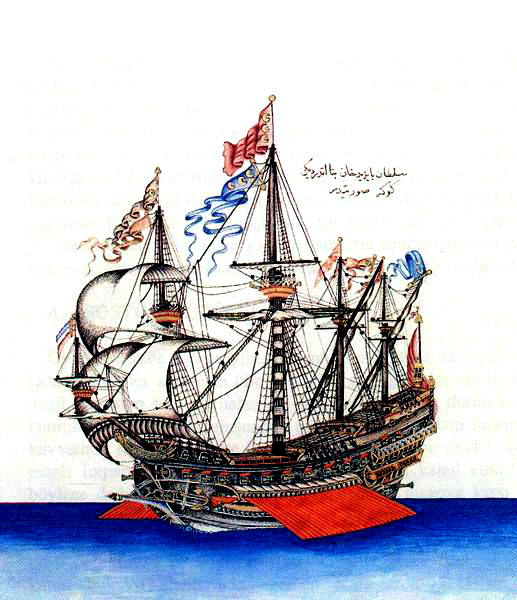
Sultan Bayezid II sent Kemal Reis to save the Sephardic Jews of Spain from the Spanish Inquisition in 1492 and granted them permission to settle in the Ottoman Empire.

An influx of Jews into Asia Minor and the Ottoman Empire, occurred during the reign of Mehmed the Conquerors's successor, Beyazid II (1481–1512), after the expulsion of the Jews from Spain and Portugal. The expulsion came about as a result of the Alhambra Decree in 1492, declared by the Spanish King and Queen Ferdinand II and Isabelle I as part of a larger trend of antisemitism resurging throughout Europe that the Ottomans would exploit. The Sephardic Jews were allowed to settle in the wealthier cities of the empire, especially in the European provinces (cities such as Istanbul, Sarajevo, Salonica, Adrianople and Nicopolis), Western and Northern Anatolia (Bursa, Aydın, Tokat and Amasya) but also in the Mediterranean coastal regions (such as Jerusalem, Safed, Damascus and Egypt). İzmir was not settled by Spanish Jews until later. The Jewish population at Jerusalem increased from 70 families in 1488 to 1,500 at the beginning of the 16th century, and that of Safed increased from 300 to 2,000 families. Damascus had a Sephardic congregation of 500 families. Istanbul had a Jewish community of 30,000 individuals with 44 synagogues. Bayezid allowed the Jews to live on the banks of the Golden Horn. Egypt, especially Cairo, received a large number of the exiles, who soon outnumbered the pre-existing Musta'arabi Jews. Gradually, the chief centre of the Sephardic Jews became Salonica, where they soon outnumbered the pre-existing Romaniote Jewish community. In fact, the Sephardic Jews eclipsed and absorbed the Romaniot Jews and changed the culture and the structure of Jewish communities in the Ottoman Empire. In the centuries that followed, the Ottomans reaped the benefits of the Jewish communities that they adopted. In exchange for Jews contributing their talents for the benefit of the empire, they would be rewarded well. Compared to European laws, which restricted life for all Jews, that was a significant opportunity, which drew Jews from across the Mediterranean.

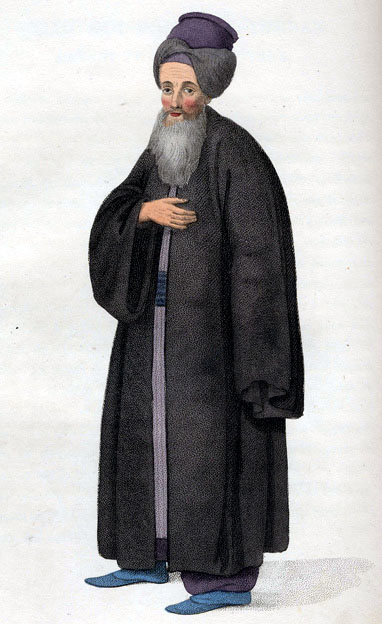
Painting of a Jewish man from the Ottoman Empire, 1779.

The Jews satisfied various needs in the Ottoman Empire. The Muslim population of the Empire was largely uninterested in business enterprises and accordingly left commercial occupations to members of minority religions. Additionally, since the Ottoman Empire was engaged in a military conflict with the Christian nations at the time, Jews were trusted and regarded "as potential allies, diplomats, and spies". There were also Jews that possessed special skills in a wide range of fields that the Ottomans took advantage of, including David and Samuel ibn Nahmias, who established a printing press in 1493. That was then a new technology and accelerated production of literature and documents, which was especially important for religious texts and bureaucratic documents. Other Jewish specialists employed by the empire included physicians and diplomats that emigrated from their homelands. Some of them were granted landed titles for their work, including Joseph Nasi, who was named Duke of Naxos.

Although the Ottomans did not treat Jews differently from other minorities in the country, the policies seemed to align well with Jewish traditions, which allowed communities to flourish. The Jewish people were allowed to establish their own autonomous communities, which included their own schools and courts. Those rights were extremely controversial in other regions in Muslim North Africa and absolutely unrealistic in Western Europe. The communities would prove to be centers of education and trade because of the large array of connections to other Jewish communities across the Mediterranean.

=== Ottoman–Mamluk War (1516–1517) ===
Two violent incidences took place in Safed and Hebron after the Ottomans had ousted the Mamluks and taken Levant during the Ottoman–Mamluk War in 1517. Accounts of the attack against the Jews in Safed were recorded by historian Rabbi Elijah Capsali of Candia, (Crete) and Rabbi Joseph Garson, who was living in Damascus at the time. The Safed attack may have been initiated by retreating Mamluk soldiers who accused the Jews of treacherously aiding the Turkish invaders, with Arabs from the surrounding villages joining the melee. In Hebron, Jews were attacked, beaten and raped, and many were killed as their homes and businesses were looted and pillaged. An account of the event, recorded by Japheth ben Manasseh in 1518, mentions how the onslaught was initiated by Turkish troops led by Murad Bey, the deputy of the Sultan from Jerusalem.

=== Banking and finance ===
In the sixteenth century, the leading financiers in Istanbul were Greeks and Jews. Many of the Jewish financiers were originally from Iberia and had fled during the period leading up to the expulsion of Jews from Spain. Many of these families brought great fortunes with them. The most notable of the Jewish banking families in the 16th-century Ottoman Empire was the Marrano banking house of Mendès, which moved to and settled in Istanbul in 1552 under the protection of sultan Suleiman the Magnificent. When Alvaro Mendès arrived in Istanbul in 1588, he is reported to have brought with him 85,000 gold ducats. The Mendès family soon acquired a dominating position in the state finances of the Ottoman Empire and in commerce with Europe.

=== Taxation ===
Ottoman Jews were obliged to pay special taxes to the Ottoman authorities. These taxes included the cizye, the ispençe, the haraç, and the rav akçesi ("rabbi tax"). Sometimes, local rulers would also levy taxes for themselves, in addition to the taxes sent to the Sublime Porte.

=== Textiles ===
The Jews of Salonica were well known for the spinning wool for the manufacture of broadcloth. However, the city was also served by large port, making it easily susceptible to infectious agents from abroad. Incidents of plague often affected the production of broadcloth as residents of Salonica repeatedly became ill, died or fled during outbreaks.

== 17th century ==
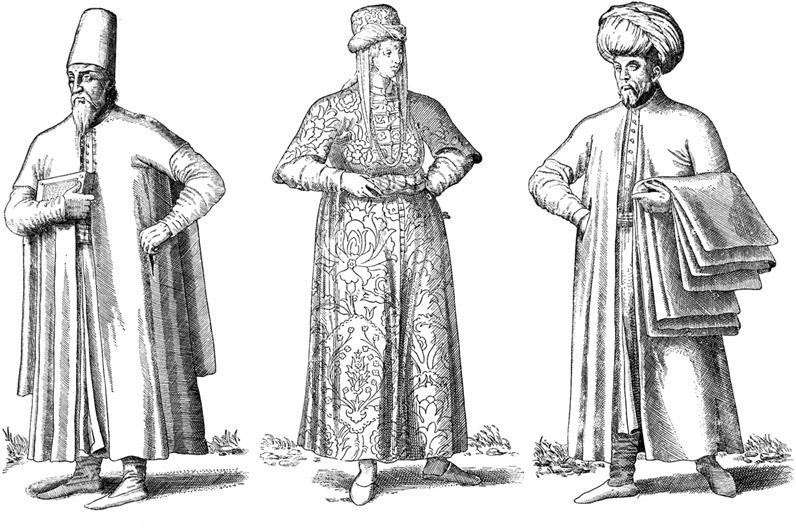
Jewish subjects of the Ottoman Empire, seventeenth century. From the 1901-1906 Jewish Encyclopedia

Friction between Jews and Turks was less common than in the Arab territories. Some examples: In 1660 or 1662, under Mehmet IV (1649–87), the city of Safed, with a substantial Jewish community, was destroyed by Druzes over a struggle for power.

== 18th and 19th centuries ==
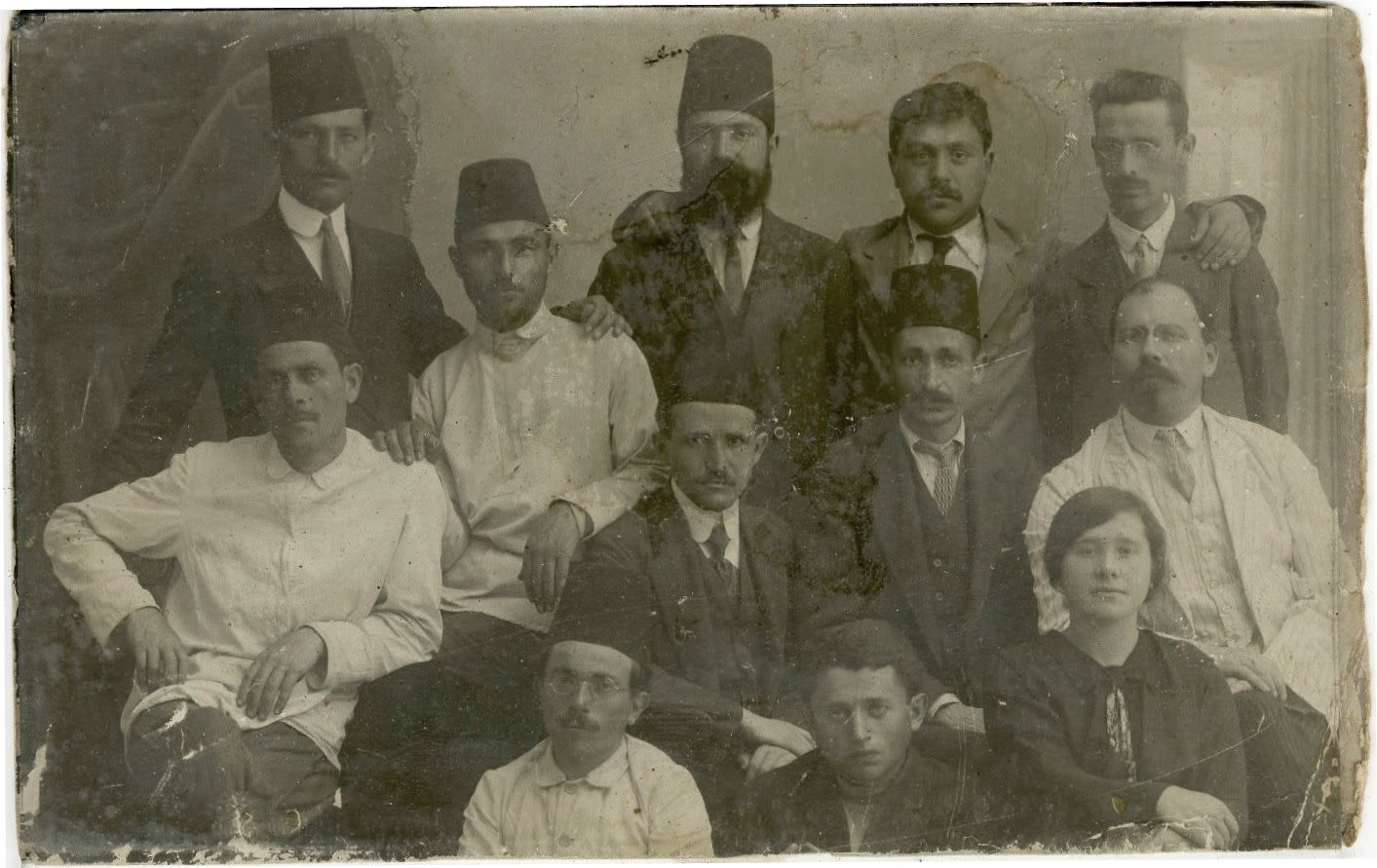
A group portrait of Jewish Ottoman men, among them, Istanbul University Law Students David Ben-Gurion (sitting row, third from right) and next to him Yitzhak Ben-Zvi (sitting row, second from right), İstanbul ("Kushta"), c. 1912

The history of Jews in the Ottoman Empire in the eighteenth and nineteenth centuries is principally a chronicle of decline in influence and power. They lost their influential positions in trade mainly to the Greeks, who were able to "capitalize on their religio-cultural ties with the West and their trading diaspora". An exception to this is Daniel de Fonseca, who was chief court physician and played a political role. He is mentioned by Voltaire, who speaks of him as an acquaintance whom he esteemed highly. Fonseca was involved in negotiations with Charles XII of Sweden.

Ottoman Jews held a variety of views on the role of Jews in the Ottoman Empire, from loyal Ottomanism to Zionism. Emanuel Karasu of Salonika, for example, a Young Turk, and believed that the Jews of the Empire should be Turks first, and Jews second.

Some Jews thrived in Baghdad, performing critical commercial functions such as money-lending and banking.

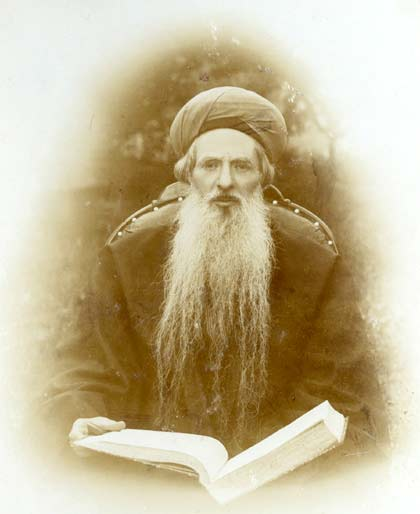
A Krymchak, a Turkic-speaking Crimean Jew (Crimean Khanate, Ottoman Empire)

Prior to the creation of the Yemen Vilayet in 1872, the Zaydi Imam of Yemen had implemented more restrictions on Jews than had been present in the Ottoman Empire, such as the Orphans' Decree, which required orphans of Jewish parents to be raised as Muslims. Once Ottoman rule began, the Orphan's Decree was revoked, although a "Dung-Gatherers' Decree," which tasked Jews with cleaning sewers, remained in effect. Also, the Ottoman authorities raised the jizya tax burden on Jews and often did not respect Jewish holidays. Starting around 1881, many Yemeni Jews began to move to Jerusalem.

In 1881, in response to rising antisemitism in mainland Europe, as well as a number of proposals made by various parties regarding the potential settlement of Jews within the empire, the Council of Ministers declared that "[Jewish] immigrants [would] be able to settle as scattered groups throughout Turkey, excluding Palestine."

=== Constitution of the Jewish millet ===
The Jewish millet agreed upon a constitution which was enacted in 1865, Konstitusyon para la nasyon yisraelita de la Turkia or the Hahamname Nizamnamesi, originally written in Judaeo-Spanish (Ladino). Writer M. Franco stated that Ottoman government employee and translator Yehezkel Gabay (1825–96) wrote the Ottoman Turkish version of this constitution.

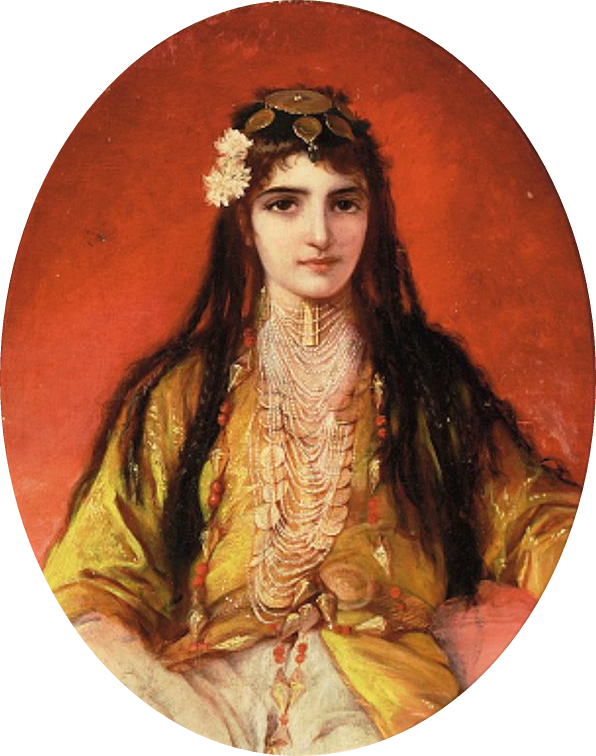
Zarina, a Jewish woman from Smyrna, 19th-century painting by Elisabeth Jerichau-Baumann

This constitution was the culmination of a struggle between progressive lay bourgeoisie and conservative rabbis over leadership in the Jewish community, as well as pressure from the Porte to codify Jewish affairs in the empire. The constitution was ultimately a temporary victory for the laity, as the constitution was quickly eroded by renewed rabbinical control and corruption. This state of affairs continued until Abdul Hamid II's accession.

The hahambaşı, or Grand Rabbi, was still the civil and spiritual ethnarch of Ottoman Jews, and he was now constrained by the creation of two councils, one spiritual (meclis-i umumi-ruhani) and one civil. These councils were elected by a general assembly (meclis-i cismani) of 80 deputies, composed of 20 rabbis and 60 laymen, themselves elected by Istanbul Jews. The hahambaşı was now an elected position, whereupon 40 extra deputies from the provinces were added to the assembly.

The Jewish millet constitution is noted for its similarity with the Armenian millet constitution. A key difference was the lack of clergy; The hahambaşı still held absolute spiritual authority over Jews of Istanbul, but provincial Jews were free to organize their local affairs as they wished. Istanbul was also the only city represented in the chamber.

=== Antisemitism ===
Historian Martin Gilbert writes that it was in the 19th century that the position of Jews worsened in Muslim countries. According to Mark Cohen in The Oxford Handbook of Jewish Studies, most scholars conclude that Arab anti-Semitism in the modern world arose in the nineteenth century, against the backdrop of conflicting Jewish and Arab nationalism, and was imported into the Arab world primarily by nationalistically minded Christian Arabs (and only subsequently was it "Islamized").

There was a massacre of Jews in Baghdad in 1828.

In 1865, when the equality of all subjects of the Ottoman Empire was proclaimed, Ahmed Cevdet Pasha, a high-ranking official observed, "whereas in former times, in the Ottoman State, the communities were ranked, with the Muslims first, then the Greeks, then the Armenians, then the Jews, now all of them were put on the same level. Some Greeks objected to this, saying: 'The government has put us together with the Jews. We were content with the supremacy of Islam.'"

Throughout the 1860s, the Jews of Libya were subjected to what Gilbert calls punitive taxation. In 1864, around 500 Jews were killed in Marrakesh and Fez in Morocco. In 1869, 18 Jews were killed in Tunis, and an Arab mob looted Jewish homes and stores, and burned synagogues, on Djerba Island. In 1875, 20 Jews were killed by a mob in Demnat, Morocco; elsewhere in Morocco, Jews were attacked and killed in the streets in broad daylight. In 1891, the leading Muslims in Jerusalem asked the Ottoman authorities in Constantinople to prohibit the entry of Jews arriving from Russia. In 1867, 1870, and 1897, synagogues were ransacked and Jews were murdered in Tripolitania.

An important instance of anti-Semitism around this time was the Damascus affair, in which many Jews in Damascus (which was then under the leadership of Muhammad Ali of Egypt) were arrested after being accused of murdering the Christian Father Thomas and his servant in an instance of blood libel. While the authorities under Sharif Pasha, Egyptian governor of Damascus, tortured the accused until they confessed to the crime, and killed two Jews who refused to confess, prominent European Jews such as Adolphe Crémieux demanded the release of the condemned.

Benny Morris writes that one symbol of Jewish degradation was the phenomenon of stone-throwing at Jews by Muslim children. Morris quotes a 19th-century traveler:

I have seen a little fellow of six years old, with a troop of fat toddlers of only three and four, teaching [them] to throw stones at a Jew, and one little urchin would, with the greatest coolness, waddle up to the man and literally spit upon his Jewish gaberdine. To all this the Jew is obliged to submit; it would be more than his life was worth to offer to strike a Mohammedan.

The overwhelming majority of the Ottoman Jews lived in the European provinces of the Empire. As the empire lost control over its European provinces in the late nineteenth and early twentieth centuries, these Jewish communities found themselves under Christian rule. The Bosnian Jews for example came under Austro-Hungarian rule after the occupation of the region in 1878. The independence of Greece, Bulgaria and Serbia further lowered the number of Jews within the borders of the Ottoman Empire.

== Jewish life ==
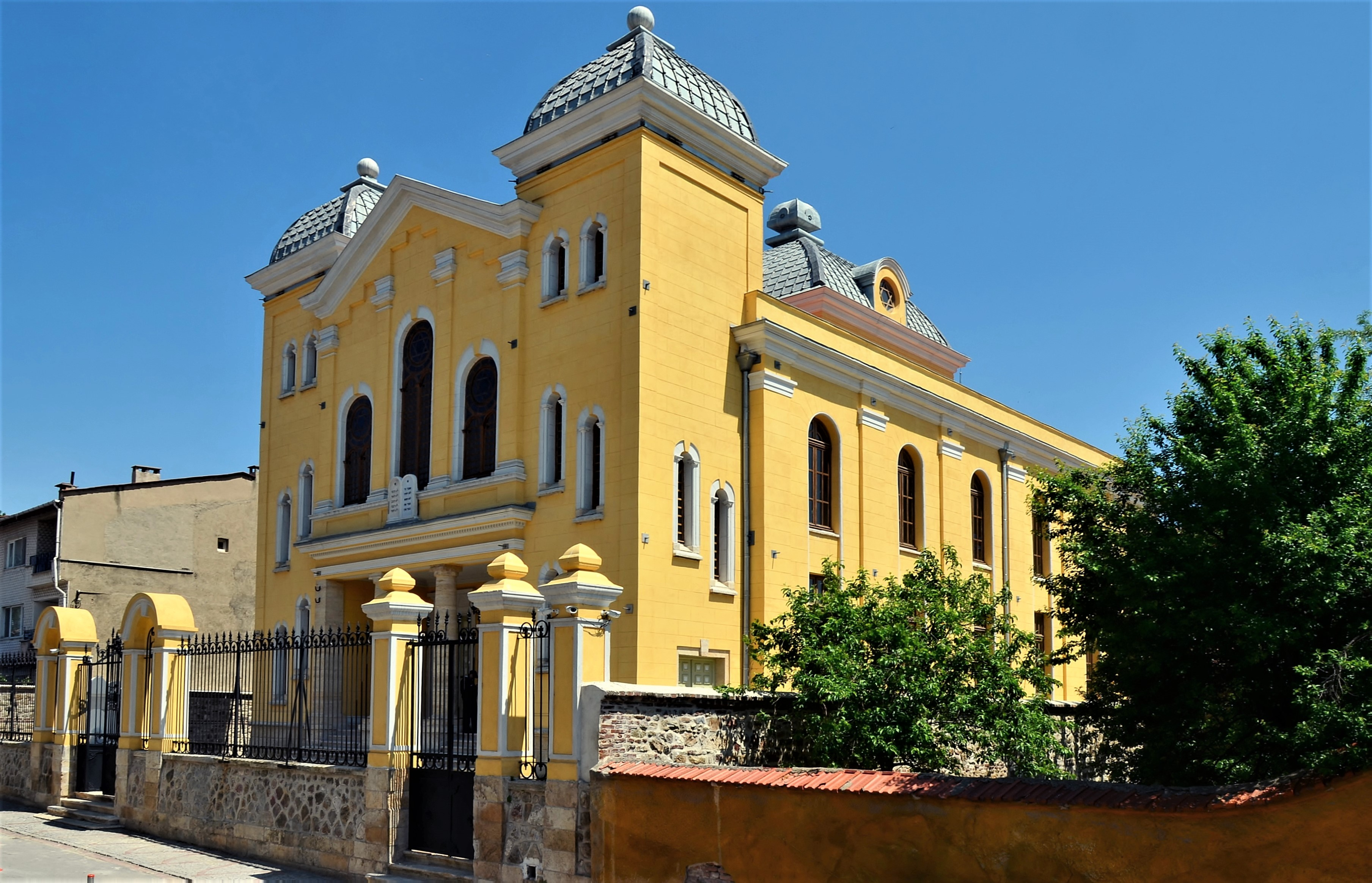
Grand Synagogue of Edirne

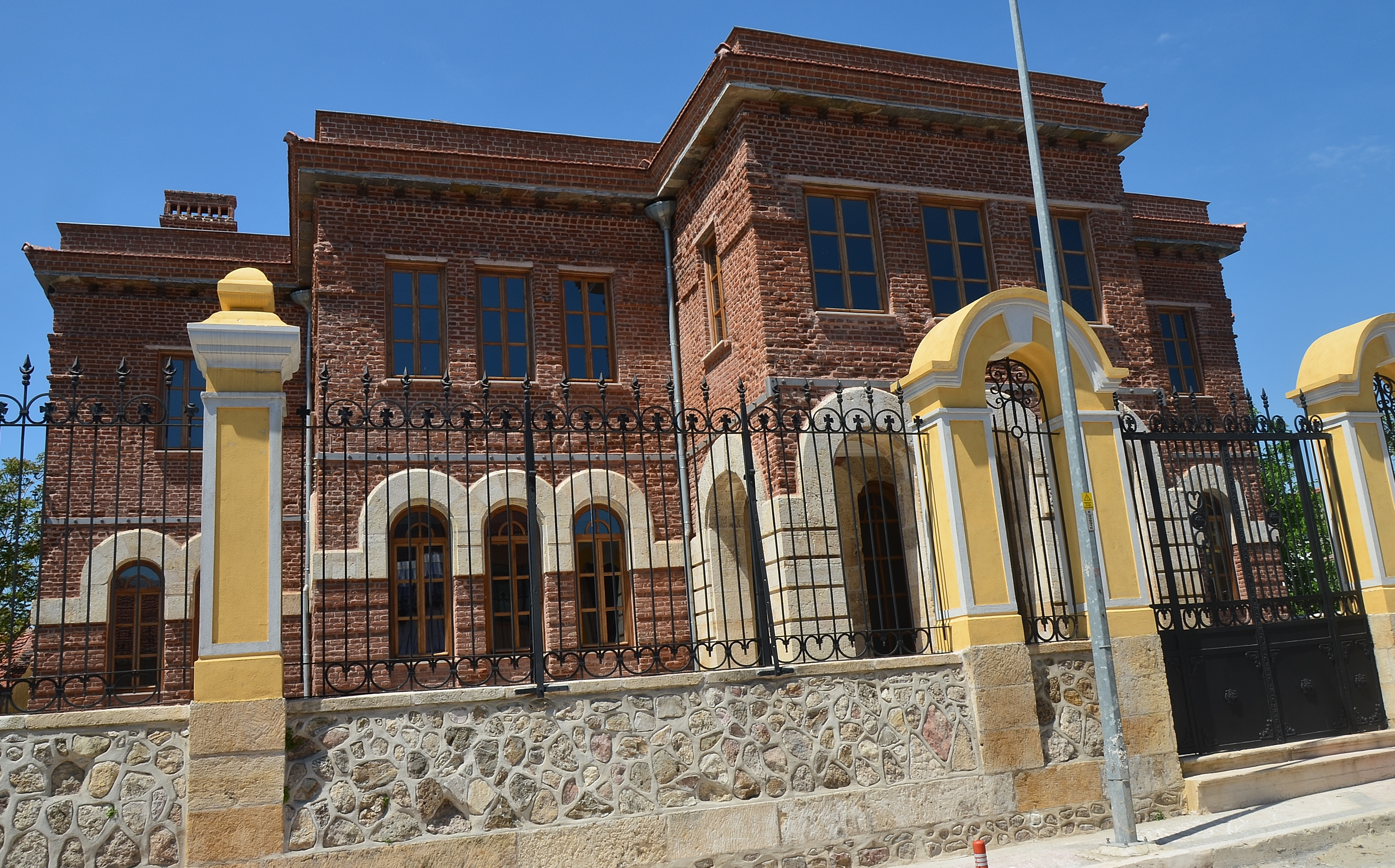
Administrative building backside of the Grand Synagogue of Edirne

Even though Jews were placed under special restrictions in the Ottoman Empire, there was still a vibrant Jewish culture in certain regions of the Empire. This was especially true for the Sephardic Jews, who had large amounts of political and cultural influence in the Ottoman Empire. The Sephardim in the Ottoman Empire had political and cultural influence because they "were perceived as Westerners who had extensive contacts with Europe, who knew European languages, and brought new knowledge and technologies". Additionally, some Sephardic Jews "were...prominent merchants with European markets" who were even regarded as "potential allies, diplomats, and spies" during times of war against Christians. Throughout the 16th century, the Ottoman Empire saw an increased Jewish influence on the economy and commerce. There is no doubt among historians that "Spanish Jews contributed significantly to the development of the capital in the Ottoman Empire in the sixteenth century".

Although many Sephardic Jews had large amounts of political and cultural capital, the Jewish community in the Ottoman Empire was decentralized for most of the region's history. This changed, however, when the Sultan appointed a Hakham Bashi or a chief rabbi to exercise jurisdiction in the community regarding issues of "marriage, divorce, engagement, and inheritance" in addition to delivering "his community's share of the taxes and keeping order" in the community.

=== Life in Salonica ===
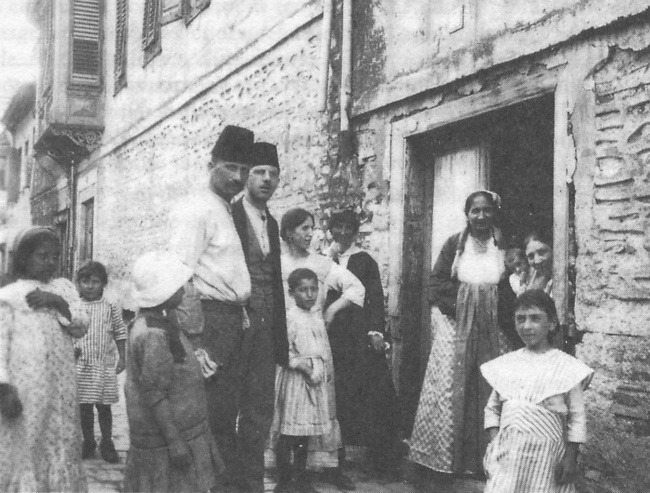
Jewish family of Salonica in 1917

Although Jews were spread throughout the Ottoman Empire, the cities of Constantinople (Istanbul) and Salonica, also called Thessaloniki, had Jewish populations of about 20,000 Jewish people by the early 16th century. Salonica was considered the main center of Jewish life in the Ottoman Empire. Jewish people maintained a strong presence in Salonica until the outbreak of World War II and the Holocaust, when "there were around 56,000 Jews living in" the city.

Salonica became the Jewish center of the Ottoman Empire after 1492. At this time, the Spanish Inquisition began in Spain and Portugal and Jews were forced to convert to Christianity or emigrate. Religious persecution caused many Sephardic Jews to immigrate to Salonica and make up a majority of the city's population. In Salonica, Jews lived in communities around synagogues in which "Jewish organizations provided all the religious, legal, educational and social services". The concentration of Jews in the city as well as the binding social capital provided by Jewish organizations allowed Salonica to become an "almost autonomous" zone for Jews to flourish in.

The strength of the Jewish community in Salonica can even be seen after the collapse of the Ottoman Empire. After the Ottoman Empire fell, the city of Salonica was not depicted as a Greek or Turkish city, but instead was considered a Jewish city.

Additionally, some historians claim Salonica was seen as the "New Jerusalem" and has been named the "Mother of Israel" where the Jewish Sabbath "was most vigorously observed". Also, there were many international organizations that considered creating a Jewish state in Salonica before the state of Israel was created in Palestine.

Sephardic Jews did not envision Palestine as the seat of Jewish governance and autonomy in the immediate aftermath of World War I. Sa'adi Levy, who lived in Salonica, owned a printing press in Amsterdam that published newspapers in Ladino and French covering the rival ideological claims and intellectual controversies of the day: Ottoman nationalism, Zionism and socialism. The family were merchants and central figures in the textile trade between Salonica and Manchester, England. In 1919, one of his sons proposed Jewish autonomy and self-governance in Salonica to the League of Nations.

== Media ==
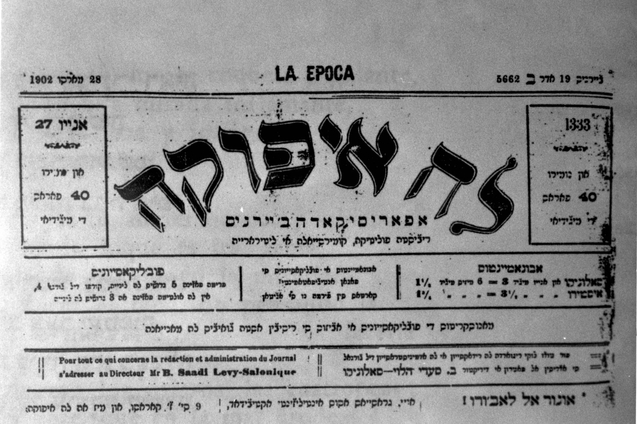
A 1902 Issue of La Epoca, a Ladino newspaper from Salonica (Thessaloniki) during the Ottoman Empire

During the Ottoman Empire, the following newspapers served Jewish communities:

- Ottoman Turkish with Hebrew characters:
  - Ceridei Tercüme ("Translation Journal"), began in 1876 and edited by Jozef Niego, published in Istanbul
  - Şarkiye ("The East"), began in 1867, edited by an anonymous person, published in Istanbul
  - Zaman ("Time"), began in 1872, edited by an anonymous person, published in Istanbul
- Ottoman Turkish and Ladino (Judeo-Spanish):
  - Ceride-i Lisan ("Language Journal"), began in 1899, edited by Avram Leyon
  - El Tiempo, a Ladino language newspaper published by David Fresco in Constantinople/Istanbul in the years 1872–1930
- French:
  - L'Aurore, published beginning in 1908, by Thessaloniki-born Lucien Sciuto; started in Istanbul then moved to Cairo
  - Le Jeune Turc ("The Young Turk")
  - Le Journal d'Orient ("The Journal of the Orient"), 1918–1977, by the political scientist Albert Carasso (Karasu)
  - La Nasion ("The Nation"), October 1919 to 17 September 1922, edited by Jak Loria
- Hebrew:
  - Hamevasser, 1909–1911, published by Nahum Solokoff

== Notable Ottoman Jews ==
- Maurice Abravanel (1903–1993), Ottoman-born American classical music conductor
- Hayyim Isaac Algazi (d. c. 1819), Chief Rabbi of Smyrna
- Hayyim ben Jacob Alfandari (1558–1640), Ottoman Talmudic educator and writer
- Yom Tov Algazi (1727–1782), Ottoman Chief Rabbi of Jerusalem (1773-1782)
- Solomon Eliezer Alfandari (c. 1826–1830), Ottoman rabbi, kabbalist and rosh yeshiva of Istanbul
- Albert Antébi (1873–1919), Ottoman public activist and community leader born in Ottoman Syria, who worked for the old and new Jewish settlement in Palestine
- Solomon Ashkenazi (c. 1520–1602), Ottoman-Venetian physician and businessman active in Ottoman, Venetian and Polish–Lithuanian politics
- Amalia Bakas (1897–1979), Ottoman-born Greek singer and performer in the United States
- Asenath Barzani (1590–1670), Ottoman-Kurdish female rabbinical scholar and poet
- Maír José Benardete (1895–1989), Ottoman-born American scholar of Sephardic studies; professor at Brooklyn College
- Joshua ben Israel Benveniste (c. 1590 – 1668), Ottoman rabbi at Constantinople and physician
- Abraham Salomon Camondo (1781–1873), Ottoman financier and philanthropist; patriarch of the House of Camondo
- Isaac de Camondo (1851–1911), Ottoman-born French businessman and art collector
- Moïse de Camondo (1860–1935), Ottoman-born French banker and art collector
- Elijah Capsali (c. 1485–1550), Ottoman rabbi and historian
- Moses Capsali (1420–1495), Ottoman rabbi; first Hakham Bashi (Chief Rabbi) of the Ottoman Empire
- Elia Carmona (1869–1931), Ottoman author and journalist; founder of El Jugueton (Hebrew: איל ג'וגיטון)
- Mordecai Comtino (d. c. 1485), Ottoman Talmudist and scientist
- Emanuel Karasu (1862–1934), Ottoman lawyer and politician; member of the Ottoman Chamber of Deputies, member of the Young Turks
- Isaac Carasso (1874–1939), Ottoman-born Spanish businessman; founder of Groupe Danone; member of Carasso family
- Elia Carmona (1869–1931), Ottoman author and journalist; founder of El Jugueton (Hebrew: איל ג'וגיטון)
- Mehmed Cavid (1875–1926), Ottoman–Dönme Minister of Finance, economist, newspaper editor and liberal politician
- Tobias Cohn (1652–1729), Polish-Ottoman physician to Ottoman Sultan Mehmed IV, Suleiman II, Ahmed II, Mustafa II and Ahmed III
- Moses Hamon (1490–1554), Ottoman physician and patron Jewish learning
- Abraham Danon (1857–1925), Ottoman rabbi, Hebraist, writer and poet
- Vitalis Danon (1897–1969), Ottoman-Tunisian writer and educator at Alliance Israélite Universelle
- Amram ben Diwan (died in 1782), Ottoman rabbi
- Roza Eskenazi (1890–1980), Istanbul-born Greek dancer and singer of rebetiko
- Eve Frank (1754–1817), Ottoman mystic cult leader
- Naftaly Frenkel (1883–1960), Ottoman-born Soviet security officer and member of the Soviet secret police
- Bohor Hallegua (d. c. 1926), Ottoman chess player
- Aaron ben Isaac Hamon (d. c. 1700s), Ottoman physician to the Ottoman royal court and printer
- Esther Handali (d. c. 1588), Ottoman businesswoman; Kira of Nurbanu Sultan, Safiye Sultan, and possibly of Hürrem Sultan
- Albert Karasu (1885–1982), Ottoman journalist
- Karolos Koun (1908–1987), Ottoman-born Greek theater director
- Shabtai Levy (1876–1956), first Jewish mayor of Haifa
- Esperanza Malchi (died in 1600), Ottoman businesswoman and Kira (business agent) of the valide sultan Safiye Sultan
- Gracia Mendes Nasi (1510–1569), Ottoman-Portuguese philanthropist, businesswoman, and member of the Mendes Benveniste family; one of the wealthiest and most influential women of Renaissance Europe; known for securing a long-term lease of Tiberias in the Safed sanjak (modern day Israel) from Suleiman the Magnificent
- Elijah Mizrachi (c. 1455–1525), Ottoman Talmudist and posek; authority on Halakha and mathematician
- Chaim Nahum (1872–1960), Ottoman rabbi; Grand Rabbi of the Ottoman Empire; jurist, and linguist; member of the Turkish delegation for the Lausanne Treaty
- Joseph Nasi (1524–1579), Ottoman diplomat and administrator; influential figure in the Ottoman Empire during the rules of both Sultan Suleiman I and Selim II
- Doctor Nâzım (1870–1926), Ottoman–Dönme physician, politician, and a Young Turk revolutionary; founding member of the Committee of Union and Progress
- Joseph Niego (1863–1945), Ottoman-born Jewish activist
- Emin Pasha (1840–1892), Ottoman physician, naturalist, and governor of the Egyptian province of Equatoria on the upper Nile
- Halil Pasha (fl. 1560s – fl. 1599), Ottoman admiral, Sultan Murad III's favourite, spy, adviser, and confidant
- Mosè Piccio (d. c. 1576), Ottoman lexicographer; compiled Zikhron Torat Moshe (Hebrew: זכרון תורת משה)
- Germaine Poliakov (1918–2020), Ottoman-born French music teacher and Holocaust survivor
- Sinan Reis (c. before 1533–1546), Ottoman corsair; second in command of the Ottoman admiral Hayreddin Barbarossa
- Moshe Sardines (1917–1984), Ottoman-born Israeli politician who served as a member of the Knesset
- Yitzhak Sarfati (d. c. 1400s), French-Ottoman rabbi; Chief Rabbi of Edirne
- Morris Schinasi (1855–1928), Ottoman-born American businessman in the tobacco industry
- Joseph Taitazak (d. c. 1529), Ottoman Talmudic authority and Kabbalist; member of the Taitazak family
- Yakup Yahya (fl. 1450–1475), Ottoman scholar and spiritual leader of all Ottoman Jews
- David Yellin (1864–1941), Ottoman educator, Hebrew researcher, politician; one of the leaders of the Yishuv, the founder of the first Hebrew College for Teachers; one of the founders of the Hebrew Language Committee and the Israel Teachers Union, and the Zikhron Moshe in Jerusalem
- Shlomo Yellin (fl. 1890–1912), Ottoman lawyer
- Sarraf Mültezim Yosef ben Shmul (1660-1729), Ottoman banker and tax farmer
- Sabbatai Zevi (1926–1676), Ottoman former Jewish mystic and rabbi from Smyrna; founder of the Sabbatean movement

== See also ==
- Labor Zionism in the Ottoman Empire
- History of the Jews in Thessaloniki
- History of the Jews in Turkey
  - Antisemitism in Turkey
  - Racism and discrimination in Turkey
- History of the Jews in Istanbul
- History of the Jews in İzmir
- Romaniotes
- Urfalim
- Jews in Palestine under Ottoman rule
- History of the Jews under Muslim rule
- Conspiracy theories in Turkey

== Sources ==
- Ben-Ami, Shlomo; Mishal, Nissim (2000). Those Were the Generations. Yedioth Ahronoth. ISBN 978-9-6544-8745-0.
- Davison, Roderic (1963), Reform in the Ottoman Empire: 1856-1876, Princeton, New Jersey: Princeton University Press
- Fine, Lawrence (2003). Physician of the Soul, Healer of the Cosmos: Isaac Luria and His Kabbalistic Fellowship. Stanford University Press.
- Finkelstein, Louis (1970). "Eretz Yisrael Under Ottoman Rule, 1517-1917". The Jews: Their History. Schocken Books. ISBN 9780805202717.
- Shmuelevitz, Aryeh (1999). Ottoman history and society: Jewish sources. Isis Press.
