= List of Thessalonians =

The lists below contain notable people who are from the city of Thessaloniki, listed alphabetically.

== Notable Thessalonians ==
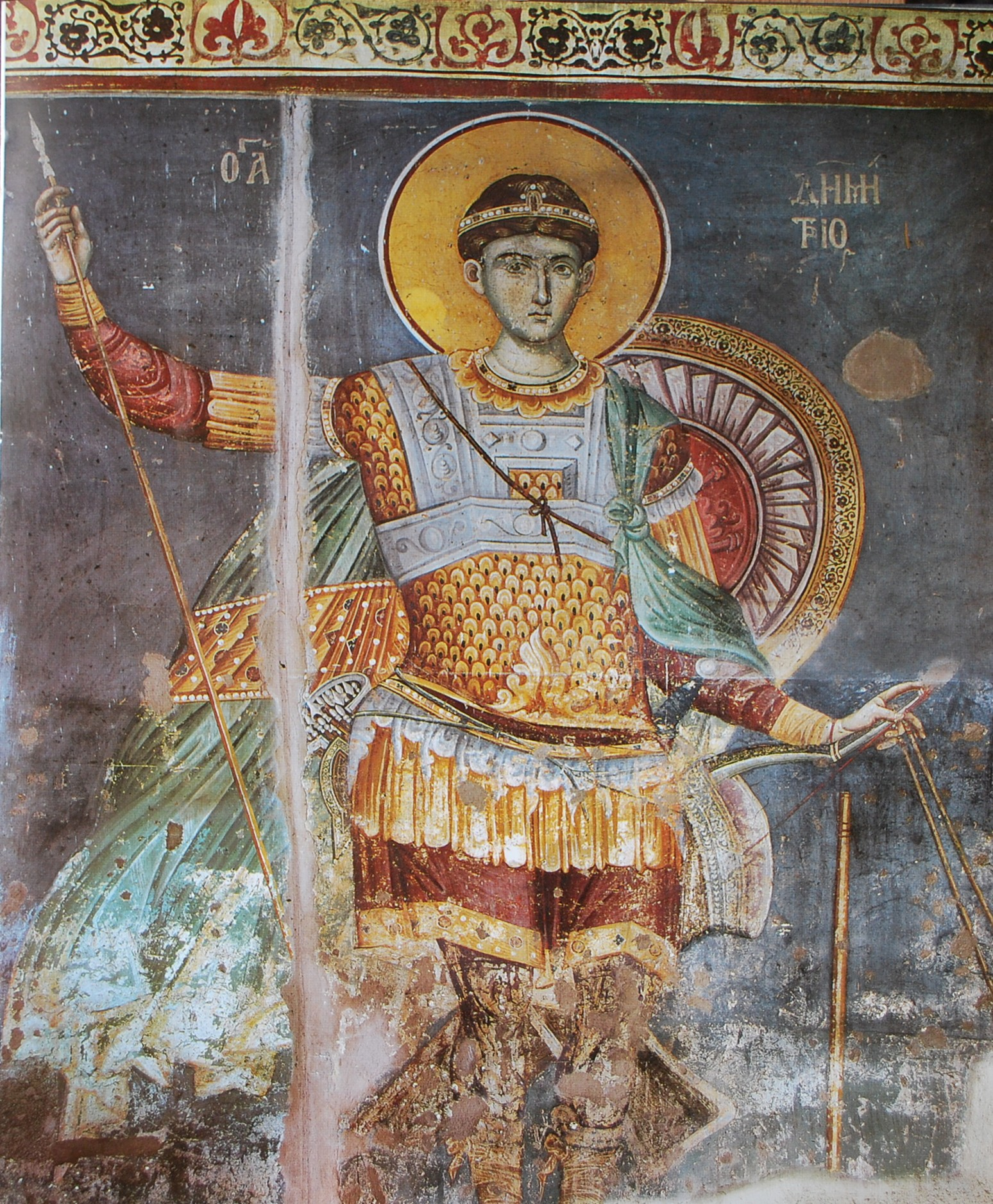
Demetrius of Thessaloniki

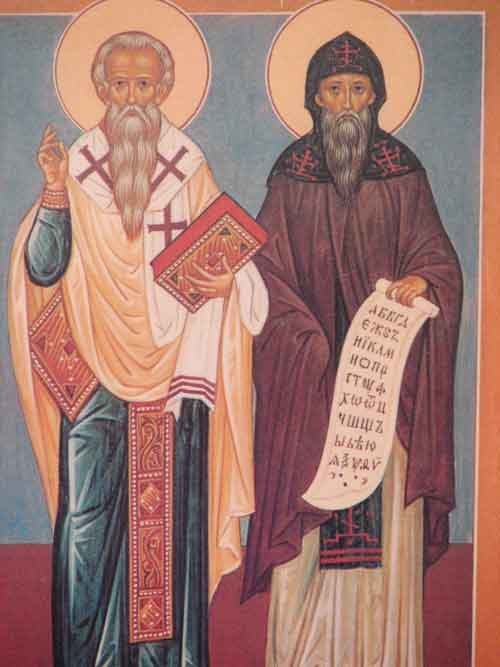
Saints Cyril and Methodius

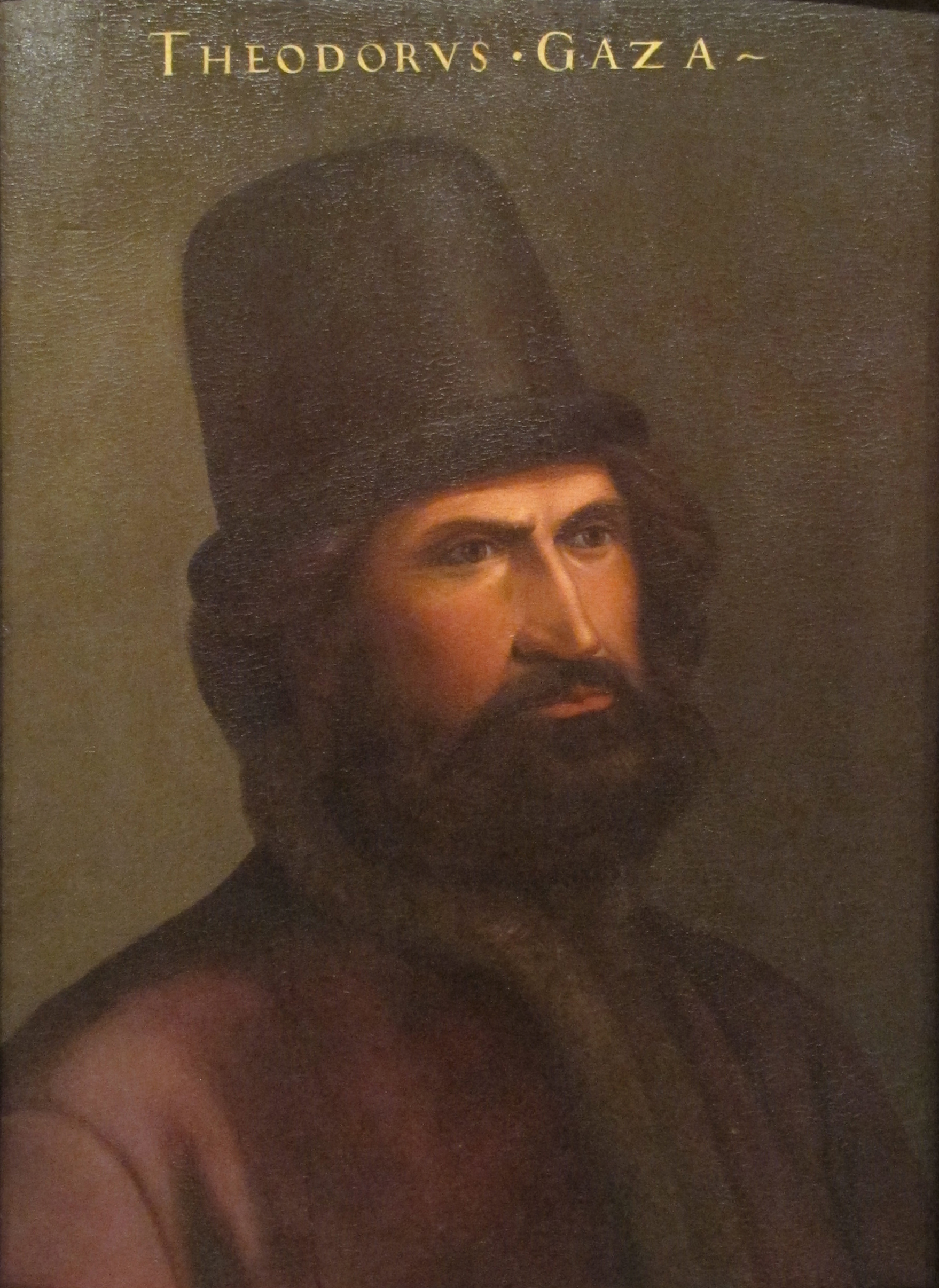
Theodorus Gaza

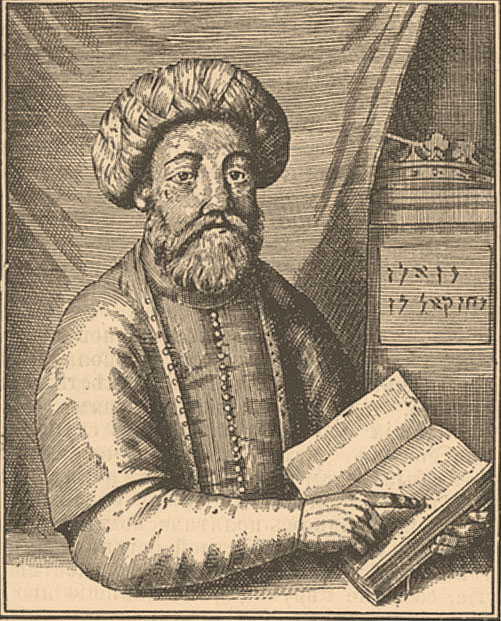
Sabbatai Zevi

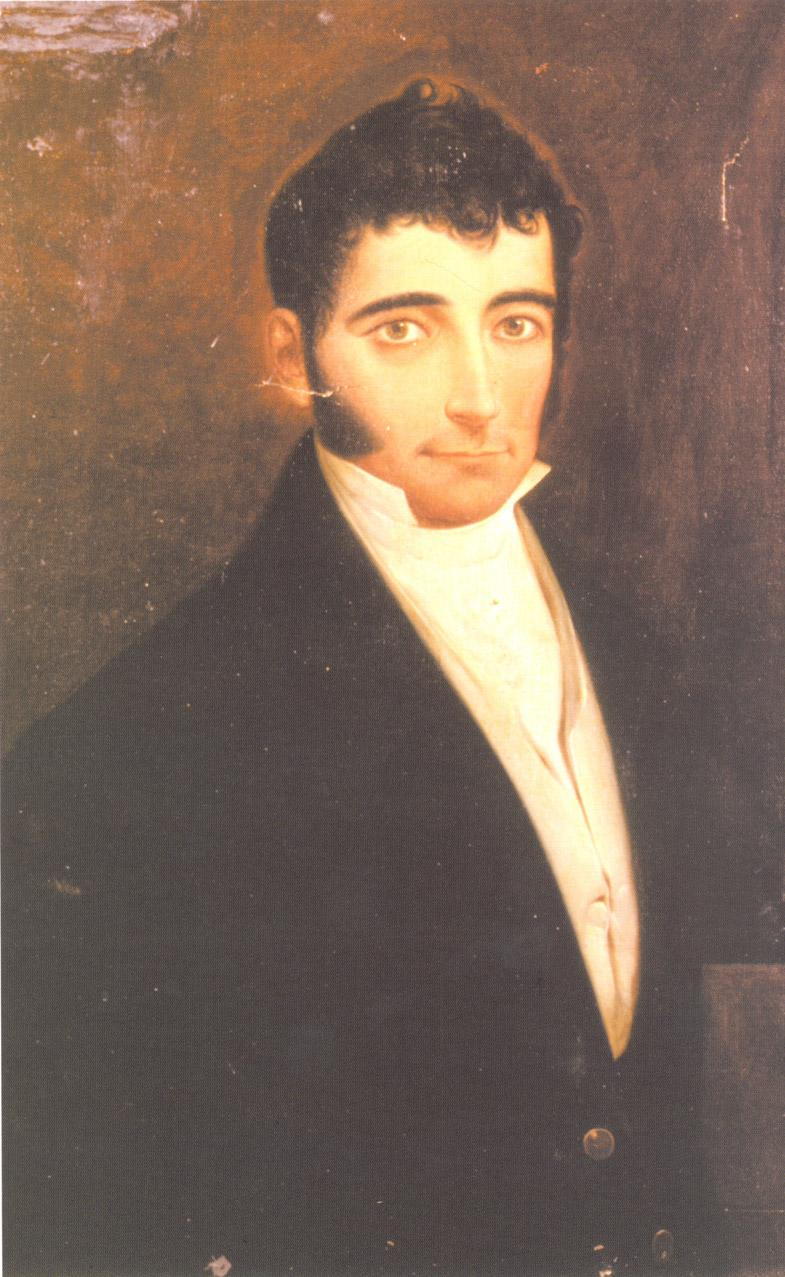
Ioannis Papafis

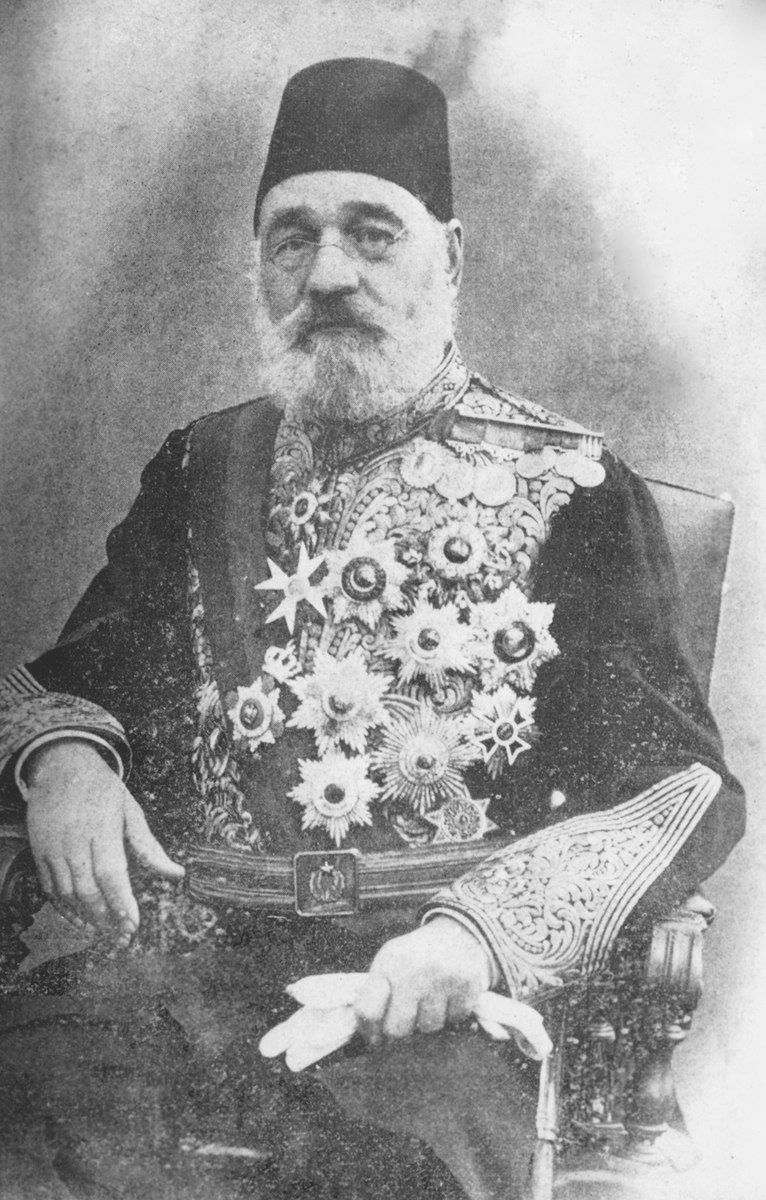
Halil Rifat Pasha

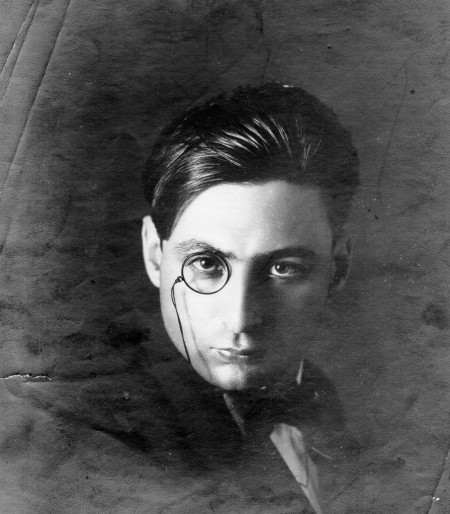
Emilios Riadis

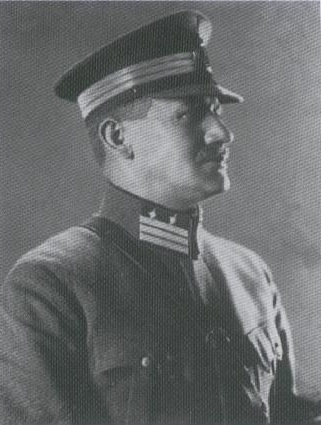
Şükrü Naili Gökberk

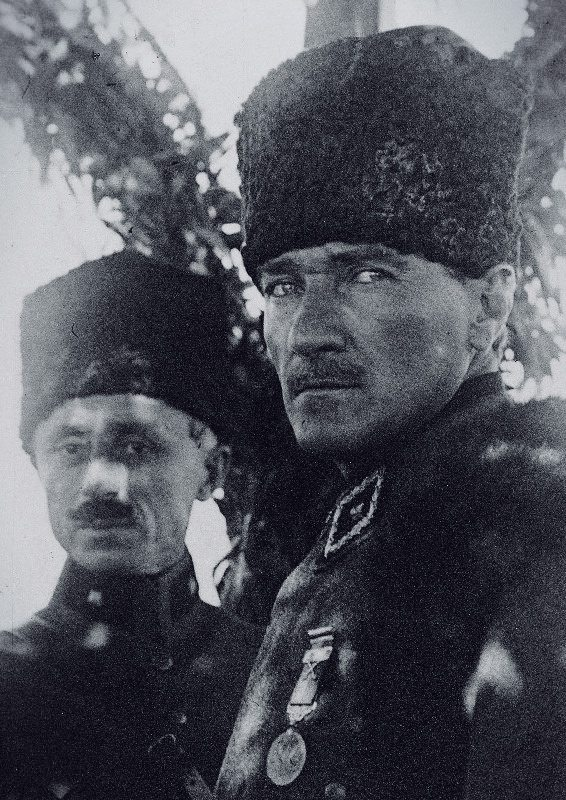
Refet Bele and Kemal Atatürk

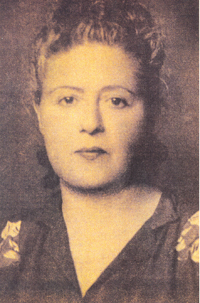
Sabiha Sertel

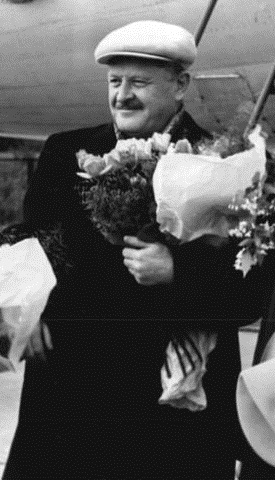
Nâzım Hikmet

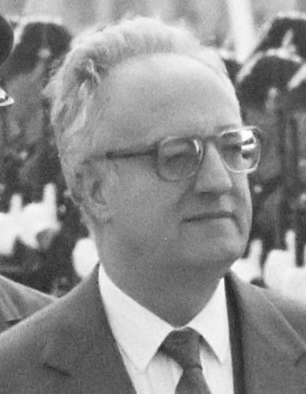
Christos Sartzetakis

The following were born in or associated with Thessaloniki. Some became famous after they moved away.

=== A ===
- Aaron Abiob (1535–1605), rabbi
- Maurice Abravanel (1903–1993), conductor
- Isaac Adarbi (c. 1510 – c. 1584), casuist
- Nikolaos Aggelakis (1905–1986), footballer
- Mary Akrivopoulou (born 1975), actress
- Shlomo Alkabetz (1505–1584), poet, kabbalist and rabbi
- Moses Almosnino (c. 1515 – c. 1580), rabbi
- Moses Alpalas (16th century), rabbi
- Saul Amarel (1928–2002), pioneer of artificial intelligence
- Moses Amarillo (18th century), rabbi
- Manolis Anagnostakis (1925–2005), poet
- Anthimos Ananiadis (born 1985), actor
- Georgios Anatolakis (born 1974), footballer
- Antipater of Thessalonica (c. 10 BCE – c. 38), epigrammatist
- Cahit Arf (1910–1997), mathematician
- Aristarchus, saint
- Konstantinos Armenopoulos (1320 – c. 1385), Byzantine jurist whose book, the Hexabiblos, influenced Byzantine, Ottoman and Modern Greek civic code
- Salamo Arouch (1923–2009), boxer
- Ḥayyim Asahel (d. before 1746) rabbi, author
- Nikolas Asimos (1949–1988), composer, singer and performance artist
- Michael Astrapas and Eutychios (flourished 1294 to 1317), painters
- Kemal Atatürk (c. 1881 – 1938), founder of the Republic of Turkey

=== B ===
- Loukas Barlos (1920–1999), businessman
- Refet Bele (1881–1963), an officer of the Ottoman Army and the Turkish Army
- Rene Ben Sussan, illustrator
- Isaak Benrubi, philosopher
- Albert Bourla
- Yiannis Boutaris
- Salih Bozok, an officer of the Ottoman Army, later the Turkish Army and a politician of the Republic of Turkey
- Fuat Bulca, an officer of the Ottoman Army and the Turkish Army

=== C ===
- Nicholas Cabasilas, Byzantine mystic
- Andronicus Callistus, scholar, pioneer of the Renaissance
- David Samuel Carasso, 19th-century Jewish traveler and writer
- Emmanuel Carasso, freemason, Young Turk, anti-Zionist, and proponent for internationalization of Thessaloniki
- Isaac Carasso, founder of Groupe Danone (Dannon yogurt)
- Manolis Chiotis, composer and musician
- Nuri Conker, politician and an officer of the Ottoman Army and the Turkish Army
- Auguste Corteau, pen name of the Greek author Petros Hadjopoulos
- Demetrius Cydones, prime minister of the Byzantine Empire
- Prochorus Cydones, monk, theologian, and linguist
- Saint Cyril, co-creator of the Cyrillic alphabet

=== D ===
- Atanas Dalchev, poet
- Traianos Dellas, footballer
- Saint Demetrius, patron saint of the city

=== E ===
- Epigonus of Thessalonica

=== F ===
- Byron Fidetzis, cellist and conductor

=== G ===
- Gus G., guitarist
- Artemi Gavezou, rhythmic gymnast and Olympic silver medalist in 2016
- Theodorus Gaza, humanist and translator of ancient Greek texts
- Katerina Georgiadou
- Philippe Gigantès, Canadian politician
- Evi Gkotzaridis, historian
- Şükrü Naili Gökberk, military officer in the Ottoman and Turkish armies
- Demetris Th. Gotsis
- Robert Guérin du Rocher, a Jesuit priest, who was beatified by Pope Pius XI in October 1926 was a pastor in the city.
- Aka Gündüz, poet, composer, and politician

=== H ===
- Costas Hajihristos
- Nâzım Hikmet, poet
- Olympia Hopsonidou, model

=== I ===
- Afet İnan, historian and sociologist
- Giannis Ioannidis, Greek basketball coach
- Isidore of Kiev, patriarch of Russia

=== K ===
- Eva Kaili, Member of Parliament and newscaster
- Giannis Kalatzis, singer
- Andronikos Kallistos, teacher of Greek literature
- Takis Kanellopoulos, director
- Christos Karipidis, footballer
- Harry Klynn, comedian
- Dimitrios Konstantopoulos, footballer
- Mary Kostakidis, Australian news anchor
- Christos Kostis, footballer
- Georgios Koudas, footballer
- Dinos Kouis, footballer
- Stavros Koujioumtzis, composer

=== L ===
- Zoe Laskari, actress
- George-Emmanuel Lazaridis, pianist
- Leo the Mathematician
- Moshe Levy, chemist

=== M ===
- Macedonius of Thessalonica
- Thomas Magister, scholar and grammarian
- Dionysis Makris, singer
- Markos Mamalakis, economist
- Mordechai Mano
- Marinella, singer
- Marsheaux, synthpop duo
- Margalit Matitiahu
- Rabbi Samuel de Medina, Talmudist and author
- Mehmed Cavid (1875–1926), Ottoman Sabbatean economist and politician who was executed for alleged involvement in an assassination attempt against Kemal Atatürk
- Saint Methodius, co-creator of the Cyrillic alphabet

=== N ===
- Doctor Nazım (1870–1926), politician and physician who was executed for alleged involvement in an assassination attempt against Kemal Atatürk
- Nicolaus Cabasilas, Byzantine mystic
- Nightrage, metal band

=== O ===
- Salih Omurtak, fourth Chief of the General Staff of the Turkish Armed Forces
- Clio-Danae Othoneou, actress, musician, and pianist
- Hatice Özgener, school teacher, politician, and one of the first 18 female members of the Turkish parliament

=== P ===
- Alketas Panagoulias
- Dimitrios Pandermalis
- Ioannis Papafis
- Vassilios Papageorgopoulos, champion sprinter
- Stelios Papathemelis
- David Pardo, Dutch rabbi, born at Salonica
- Joseph Pardo, rabbi
- Halil Rifat Pasha, Ottoman statesman and a Grand Vizier
- Natasa Pazaïti
- Aaron Hakohen Perahyah, rabbi and writer
- Philippus, epigrammatist
- Patriarch Philotheus I of Constantinople, Ecumenical Patriarch of Constantinople
- Philippus of Thessalonica
- Pyrrhus of Thessalonica, fortificator (ca. 620–630 AD)
- Evangelia Psarra, archer

=== Q ===
- Jacob Querido

=== R ===
- Emilios Riadis, classical composer
- Georgios Roubanis

=== S ===
- Sabiha Sertel, professional journalist and publisher in Turkey
- Raphaël Salem, mathematician
- Dimitris Salpingidis, footballer
- Victoria Samanidou, analytical chemist and professor
- Christos Sartzetakis, President of the Hellenic Republic
- Dionysis Savvopoulos, composer
- Ioannis Sfairopoulos (born 1967), basketball coach in the Israeli Basketball Premier League and EuroLeague
- Solomon Sirilio, rabbi and Talmud commentator
- Ahmet Zeki Soydemir, officer of the Ottoman Army and a general of the Turkish Army
- Anthoula Stathopoulou-Vafopoulou, poet and playwright
- Yannis Stavrou, contemporary artist
- Damaskinos Stouditis, patriarchal exarch of Aitolia
- Nathanael Symeonides, Greek Orthodox Metropolitan of Chicago

=== T ===
- Hasan Tahsin, Ottoman patriot of Jewish Dönmeh descent who was resisted to Greek invasion of Smyrna (İzmir) after World War I
- Calliope Tatti, socialite
- Natassa Theodoridou, singer
- Dimo Todorovski, sculptor and artist
- Makis Triantafyllopoulos
- Demetrius Triclinius, scholar
- Dimosthenis Tampakos, gymnast who won gold medal in 2004 Olympic Games
- Theodoros Tsorbatzoglou, businessman and FIDE Master (chess)

=== U ===
- Hasan Tahsin Uzer, bureaucrat

=== V ===
- Shlomo Venezia
- Evangelos Venizelos
- Kostas Voutsas, actor

=== Y ===
- Ahmet Emin Yalman, journalist and author

=== Z ===
- Grigorios Zalykis, scholar, writer, and diplomat
- Anastasia Zampounidis, German TV personality
- Nikos Zisis, basketball player
