= Karasu =

Karasu, Kara-su, Kara su or Qarasu means 'black water' or 'black river' in Turkic languages. In Japanese, karasu means 'raven' or 'crow'. It may refer to:

== Rivers ==
=== The Balkans ===
- A former name of the Struma River (Struma Karasu) in Bulgaria and Thrace, northern Greece
- A former name of the Mesta/Nestos River (Mesta Karasu) in Bulgaria and northern Greece, forming the border between Greek Macedonia and Thrace
- A former name of the Haliacmon (İnce Karasu) in western Macedonia, northern Greece
- Karasu (Istanbul), a river in the greater Istanbul area of Turkey

=== Central Asia ===
- Qarasu River, a small river in northeast Iran feeding into the southeast corner of the Caspian Sea
- Kara-Suu (Aksy), a right tributary of the river Naryn in Aksy District, Kyrgyzstan
- Kara-Suu (Kara-Köl), a left tributary of the river Naryn near Kara-Köl, Kyrgyzstan
- Karasu, name of the last stretch of river Shiderti, Kazakhstan
- Karasu (Koybagar), a river in Kostanay Region, Kazakhstan
- Karasu (Karasor), a river in Karaganda Region, Kazakhstan

=== Japan ===
- Karasu River (Gunma) in Gunma Prefecture, Japan

=== Turkey ===
- Karasu (Euphrates), the western of the two major sources of the Euphrates in Eastern Anatolia
- Karasu (Hatay), a tributary of the Orontes River (formerly of Lake Amik) in Hatay Province, southeastern Turkey, bordering Syria
- A small river in northwest Anatolia, a tributary of the Sakarya River

== Town and villages ==
=== Azerbaijan ===
- Qarasu, Hajigabul
- Qarasu, Kurdamir
- Qarasu, Qabala
- Karasu Kumlakh or Qarasuqumlaq, Agdash Rayon

=== China ===
- Karasu, Xinjiang, a place at the foot of the Kulma Pass

=== Crimea ===
- Karasubazar

=== Japan ===
- Karasu, Mie

=== Kazakhstan ===
- Karasu District, Kostanay Region
- Karasu (village), administrative center of Karasu District

=== Kyrgyzstan ===
- several places, see Kara-Suu (disambiguation)

=== Tajikistan ===
- Karasu, Tajikistan, Vahdat District

=== Turkey ===
- Karasu, Sakarya, a town in Sakarya Province
- Karasu, Karacabey, a village in Bursa Province
- Karasu, Yenice, a village in Çanakkale Province
- Karasu, Refahiye, a village in Erzincan Province
- Karasu, Aşkale, a mahalle in Erzurum Province
- Karasu, Karayazı, a mahalle in Erzurum Province

=== Uzbekistan ===
- Karasu or Qorasuv, Andijan Province, adjacent to Kara-Suu, Kyrgyzstan

== Fictional characters ==
- Karasu, a character from the manga and anime series Yu Yu Hakusho
- Karasu, a Noein character
- Karasu, a ninja puppet in Naruto
- Tabito Karasu, a character in Blue Lock

== Other uses ==
- Karasu, an album in the 13 Japanese Birds series by Merzbow
- Karasu, or Ravens, or The Solitude of Ravens, a photo book by Masahisa Fukase
- Karasu Bay, a fictional bay in the air combat video game The Sky Crawlers: Innocent Aces
- Karasu relief, a rock relief in Turkey, near where the Karasu River, the western branch of the Euphrates, joins the eastern branch of the Euphrates
- Karasu, a species of giant beaked whale

== People with the surname ==
- Carasso family, a Sephardic Jewish family of Salonika, often spelled Karasu
  - Emmanuel Carasso (1862–1934), lawyer and politician
  - Isaac Carasso (1874–1939), Emanuel's nephew, founder of Groupe Danone
  - Daniel Carasso, Isaac's son, co-founder of Dannon in the U.S.
- Albert Karasu, Jewish-Turkish journalist
- Bilge Karasu (1930–1995), Turkish writer
- Oğuzhan Karasu (born 1995), Turkish volleyball player
