= Hamevasser =

Zionist Hebrew-language weekly newspaper

- Type: Weekly
- Editor: S. Hochberg
- Founded: 1910
- Ceased publication: 1911
- Political alignment: Zionist
- Language: Hebrew
- Headquarters: Constantinople
- Sister newspapers: Courier d'Orient/Jeune Turc, l'Aurore, El Judeo

Hamevasser ('The Herald') was a Zionist Hebrew-language weekly newspaper published from Constantinople 1909-1911. As the number of Hebrew literates was limited at the time, the circle of readership of the newspaper was rather limited. However, the publication of the newspaper contributed to enhancing the status of Hebrew in the Jewish community. Hamevasser was distributed in various parts of the Ottoman Empire and beyond, reaching Greece, Bulgaria, Tunisia and Morocco. Hamevasser was produced by a small circle of Zionist journalists, and was edited by S. Hochberg.

Hamevasser had three sister newspapers, the French weekly L'Aurore, the Judeo-Spanish weekly El Judeo and the French daily Courier d'Orient/Le Jeune Turc (which was not an explicitly Jewish publication, but directed to a broader readership). Vladimir Jabotinsky functioned as the key organizer of this Zionist media network. A press committee for the four newspapers consisted of Jabotinsky, Hochberg and Jacobson. Jabotinsky contributed with several articles to Hamevasser.

Generally, the news-coverage in Hamevasser were concentrated around Jewish and Turkish affairs, the affairs of the Ottoman empire and Jewish-Turkish-Ottoman relations.

Politically, Hamevasser was generally supportive of the constitutionalist rule established after the Young Turks revolution of 1908 and its liberal-oriented reforms. Hamevasser welcomed the introduction of conscription of non-Muslims into the Ottoman army, and argued that Jewish youth should enroll as a means to improve Jewish-Turkish relations. Regarding Palestine, it argued that Zionist settlement to Palestine was economically favourable for the development of the Ottoman empire. Hamevasser rebutted claims circulated by other contemporary press outlets (such as Alemdar), which stated that Zionism was anti-Turkish.

Regarding the language question Hamevasser argued in favour of having Hebrew as the first language in Jewish schools, stating that Hebrew was the Jewish national language. It consciously favoured Hebrew over Judeo-Spanish. Turkish or Arabic (depending on which part in the empire the school would be located) were proposed as secondary languages. French was proposed as a third language, being a language of importance for international communication.
