= Rena Molho =

Greek historian (born 1946)

- Born: 1946 (age 79–80); Thessaloniki, Central Macedonia, Greece
- Education: Hebrew University of Jerusalem; Aristotle University of Thessaloniki; University of Strasbourg
- Occupation: Historian
- Years active: 26

Rena Molho (born 1946) is a Greek historian who focuses on the different aspects of Ottoman and Greek Jewish history and culture and more specifically that of the Jews of Salonika.

== Early life and education ==
She was born in Thessaloniki, Greece, the original and official name of Salonika.

Molho studied European history at the Hebrew University of Jerusalem, the Aristotle University of Thessaloniki and received a Doctor of Philosophy with distinctions from the University of Strasbourg.

== Career ==
She has taken part in many symposiums, television and radio programs, in Greece and abroad and has published her research in Greek and international scientific books, encyclopedias and journals. Her research has been supported with grants by the Memorial Foundation for Jewish Culture in New York City and by the Survivors of the Shoah Visual History Foundation in Los Angeles.

In 1996, she acted as senior interviewer and coordinator in Greece for the Survivors of the Shoah Visual History Foundation and has videotaped seventy Greek Holocaust survivors' personal accounts.

Molho has taught the history of the Jewish presence in Greece in seminars organized by the International Study Groups, and since 1991 with a group of other historians she co-founded the Society for the Study of Greek Jewry. For eight years, as of 1999, she taught the history of Greek Jewry at Panteion University in Athens, the first and only Greek academic institution to include the course of Jewish history in its curriculum in Greece until today. Her book The Jews of Thessaloniki, 1856–1919: A Unique Community received the Athens Academy Award in December 2000 and in 2001 it was published in Greek by Themelion Publishing. After this, it became a university handbook distributed to Greek students of Jewish history. This book has been translated and will be soon published in Turkish.

From 2005 to 2007, she was the Greek coordinator for Centropa(), a Vienna, Austria-based Jewish historical institute which conducted a new series of audio interviews of Thessaloniki-born survivors who after 1945 returned and settled in Greece.

She has published a great number of academic articles in all the major European languages as well as in Greek, Hebrew and Turkish.

In 2010, she was decorated with the medal of the order of Ordre des Palmes Académiques for her contribution to the French academia.

Among her latest books, Salonica-Istanbul: Social, Political and Cultural Aspects of Jewish Life (2005) comprises a collection of eighteen studies in English and French and was published by Isis Press.

Her book Jewish Sites in Thessaloniki: Brief History and Guide (2009), published by Lycabettus Press in Athens, became a best seller, and was also published in Greek (2010) and in German (2011).

== Selected publications ==
- (1986). "Venizelos and the Jewish Community of Salonica, 1912-1919" Archived 2012-04-25 at the Wayback Machine. Journal of the Hellenic Diaspora. XIII/34 pp. 113–123.
- (1988). "The Jewish Community of Thessaloniki and Its Incorporation into the Greek State, 1912–1919". Middle Eastern Studies. Vol. 24. pp. 39–403.
- (1992). "Salonique après 1912: Propagandes étrangères et communauté juive". Révue historique. CCLXXXVII/1. pp. 127–140.
- (1992). "Le Renouveau...", in Gilles Veinstein (editor), Salonique 1850–1918: La "ville des Juifs" et le réveil des Balkans. Paris: Autrement. pp. 64–78. ISBN 978-2-86260-356-8.
- (Summer–Fall 1998/1993). "Popular Antisemitism and State Policy in Salonica During the City's Annexation to Greece". Jewish Social Studies. Vol. L, nos. 3–4. pp. 253–264.
- (1993). "Events and Prominent Figures", στο Yannis Megas (επιμέλεια), Souvenir, Images of the Jewish Community, 1897-1917 Athens. pp. 158–181.
- (1993). "Education in the Jewish Community of Thessaloniki in the Beginning of the 20th Century", Balkan Studies. 34/2. pp. 259–269.
- (June 1993). "50 Years of the Holocaust of the Greek Jewry in Salonika". Demos: The Pasok Review. τεύχος. pp. 28–31.
- (1997). "The Zionist Movement in Thessaloniki up to the A'Panhellenic Zionist Congress". Proceedings of the International Jewish Communities of Southeastern Europe from the 15th Century to the End of World War II – October 30 – November 3, 1997, Thessaloniki. pp. 327–350.
- (November 1997). "Le développement culturel du début du XXème siècle". Les cahiers de l'Alliance Israélite Universelle / Dossier : Les Juifs de Salonique. number 17, pp. 32–34.
- "Los sefardies en tiempos modernos :el cavso de los judios de Salonica". Actas del Encuentro sobre la cultura sefardi, Fundacion Duques de Soria, universitad de Salamanca, Salamanca, 24-26 Ιουνίου 2002, pp. 1–15.
- "Jewish Working-Class Neighborhoods Established in Salonica Following the 1890 and 1917 Fires", in Minna Rozen, editor, The Last Ottoman Century and Beyond: The Jews in Turkey and the Balkans, 1808–1945, Vol.II. (Proceedings of the International Conference on The Jewish Communities in the Balkans and Turkey in the 19th and 20th Centuries through the End of World War II, the Goldstein-Goren Diaspora Research Center, Tel Aviv University 5–8 June 1995), Tel Aviv University, Tel Aviv 2002, pp. 173–194.
- "The Jewish Press in Salonica", in Christ. Herzog, Raoul Motika et Michael Ursinus, (επιμέλεια) Querelles privées et contestations publiques : le rôle de la presse dans la formation de l'opinion publique au Proche Orient, Isis, Istanbul, 2003, pp. 209–220. (proceedings of the International conference for the press in the Near and Middle East (XIX & XX αιώνες): Querelles privées et contestations publiques: le rôle de la presse dans la formation de l'opinion publique au Proche et au Moyen Orient, Aix en Provence, 2–4 July 1996).
- "Le theatre judeo-espagnol de Salonique: une source de l'histoire sociale des juifs locaux". in press in the Proceedings of Ecole Normale Superieure Visages de Salonique, in Paris, in 22–23 May 2003.
- (July–September 2003). "Les juifs en Grèce au XXème siècle". Matériaux. no.71, pp. 39–48.
- (2004). "Digital Autobiographical Biographies: Centropa's Method in Reconstructing and Sharing the History and Culture of Annihilated Jewish Communities", in The Library of Rescued Memories. Centropa: Witness to a Jewish Century. Annual Report 2004, p. 2.
- "Judeospanish Theatre Plays on the Themes of Tradition and Change in the Early Twentieth Century", Proceedings of the Twelfth British Conference on Judeo-Spanish Studies 24–26 June 2001, Brill, 2004, pp. 141–147.
- (2005). Salonica and Istanbul: Social, Political and Cultural Aspects of Jewish Life. Istanbul: Isis Press. ISBN 978-975-428-278-8. A collection of various articles and includes:
  1. Part I: Historical Overview
    - Les Juifs en Grèce au XXème siècle
    - The Jewish Presence in Salonica
    - Germany's Policy Against the Jews of Greece: The Annihilation of the Jewish Community of Thessaloniki, 1941–1944
  2. Part II: Social and Institutional Organisation
    - Etat de la recherche
    - Le renouveau de la communauté juive de Salonique entre 1856 et 1919
    - Les Juifs d?Istanbul avant et après les Tanzimat
    - Jewish Working-Class Neighborhoods Established in Salonica Following the 1890 and 1917 Fires
    - Education in the Jewish Community of Salonica in the Beginning of the Twentieth Century
    - Female Jewish Education in Salonica at the End of the 19th Century
    - Le Cercle de Salonique 1873–1958 : Club des Saloniciens
  3. Part III: The Political Role of the Jews from 1908 to 1936
    - The Zionist Movement in Salonica up to the A' Panhellenic Zionist Congress
    - The Jewish Community of Salonica and Its Incorporation into the Greek State 1912–1919
    - Salonique après 1912. Les propagandes étrangères et la communauté juive
    - Popular Antisemitism and State Policy in Salonica during the City's Annexation to Greece, 1912–1919
    - La législation anti-juive de Venizélos entre les deux guerres ou comment la République peut venir au secours de l'antisémitisme
  4. Part IV: Judeo-Spanish Language and Culture
    - The Judeo-Spanish, a Mediterranean Language in Daily Use in 20th Century Salonica
    - Le théâtre judéo-espagnol à Salonique: une source de l'histoire sociale des Juifs locaux
    - Judeo-Spanish Theatre Plays on the Themes of Tradition and Change in the Early Twentieth Century
- (July–December 2006). "La politique de l'Allemagne contre les juifs de Grèce", in George Bensoussan, Revue d'histoire de la Shoah: Les conseils juifs dans l'Europe Allemande. no. 185. pp. 355–377.
- "Digital Autobiographical Biographies: Centropa's Method in Reconstructing and Sharing the History and Culture of Annihilated Jewish Communities". [Web]
- (2007). "Jews in Salonika within the Cultural Change of the 19th Century". New Jewish Time – Jewish Culture in a Secular Age – An Encyclopedic View, Editor in Chief: Yirmiyahu Yovel, Initiator, director and editor: Yair Tzaban, General Editor: David Shaham, Israel: Keter Publishing House. vol. C.
- (2008). "Salonica, la Jérusalem de los Balcanes", in Elena Romero[editora], El camino de la lengua castillana y su expansion en el mediterráneo. Las rutas de Sefarad, Itinerario cultural europeo del consejo de Europa, Longrono. pp. 131–161.
- (December 2008). "The Moral Values of the Alliance Israélite Universelle and their Impact on the Jewish School World of Salonika and Morocco", in El Presente, Estudios sobre la cultura sefardi:La cultura Judeo-Española del Norte de Marruecos, vol. 2. Universidad ben Gurion del Negev y Sentro Moshe David Gaon de Kultura Djudeo-Espanyola, pp. 127–137. (Proceedings of the International Research Workshop: The Judeo-Spanish Proverb from Northern Morocco (Haketia), June 3–6, 2007).
- (January 2008). "Die Juden Salonikis im kulturellen Wandel des 19. Jahrhunderts-oder: Das Jerusalem des Balkans". in Transversal. pp. 75–94.
- "Le patrimoine culturel des juifs de Grèce, confronté à a grécisation". De Selaniklis juifs en victimes de la Shoah », in press, in the proceedings of the conference: Patrimoines immatériels et identités communautaires à l'heure de l'Etat-Nation. Formation et transmission des héritages culturels dans le monde turc et les pays successeurs de l'Empire ottoman (Turquie, sud-est européen, Proche-Orient), journées d'études, 14 et 15 février 2008.
- "Salonika: Female Education at the End of the Nineteenth Century". Encyclopedia of Jewish Women.
- "The Young Turk Movement and Its Impact on the Jews of Salonika" in press in the Proceedings of an International Conference on the Centenary of the Young Turks' Revolution 1908–2008 : The Young Turks and Their Legacy, οrganized by the Department of Balkan, Slavic and Oriental Studies at the University of Macedonia in collaboration with CIEPO, 10–11 October 2008, Thessaloniki, Greece.
- (2011). Los Souvenires del Dr. Yoel': "An Autobiographical Account of Educational, Professional, and Social Change in Salonika at the Turn of the 20th Century".
- "Jewish Communities in Greece, 1492–1945". Encyclopedia of Jewish Diaspora.
- «La destruction des Juifs de Grèce», Larousse de la Shoah, in September 2009.
- (2008). Book review on Elena Romero, Entre dos (o más) fuegos: Fuentes poéticas para la historia de los sefardíes de los Balcanes. Madrid: Spanish National Research Council, Madrid.
- "Visual History and Centropa's Digital Archives in Retrieving Holocaust Memory" in press in the proceedings of the conference Oral History And Memory Studies: An Uneasy Relationship, International Workshop, 24–25 April 2009, Athens
- (2009). With Vilma Chastaoglou. Jewish Sites in Thessaloniki: Brief History and Guide. Athens: Lycabettus Press. ISBN 978-960-7269-49-2.

== See also ==
- Academy of Athens (modern)
- List of historians
- List of Strasbourg people
- List of Thessalonians
- List of women writers
