= Kara-Suu (disambiguation) =

Kara-Suu may refer to the following places in Kyrgyzstan:

- Kara-Suu, capital of Kara-Suu District, Osh Region
- Kara-Suu, Batken, a village in Leylek District, Batken Region
- Kara-Suu, Chuy, a village in Jayyl District, Chuy Region
- Kara-Suu, Aksy, a village in Aksy District, Jalal-Abad Region
- Kara-Suu, Toguz-Toro, a village in Toguz-Toro District, Jalal-Abad Region
- Kara-Suu, Toktogul, a village in Toktogul District, Jalal-Abad Region
- Kara-Suu, At-Bashy, a village in At-Bashy District, Naryn Region
- Kara-Suu, Kochkor, a village in Kochkor District, Naryn Region
- Kara-Suu, Talas, a village in Talas District, Talas Region

== See also ==
- Karasu (disambiguation)
