= Carasso family =

Sephardic Jewish family

The Carasso family (also spelled Karasu, Karaso, Karassu, Karsu, Karso, Carrasco and Karasso) was a prominent Sephardic Jewish family in Ottoman Selanik (modern Thessaloniki, Greece). In the early 20th century, some members of the family were active in the Young Turks and others went on to found the modern yogurt industry.

Notable members of the family include:

- David Samuel Carasso (fl. 1874–1880), writer and traveler
- Emmanuel Carasso or Emanuel Karasu (1862–1934) was a lawyer and politician, and prominent member of the Young Turks. His name was Turkified as Emanuel Karasu, meaning 'black water'.
- Isaac Carasso (1874–1939) emigrated to Barcelona, where he founded the yogurt company that became Groupe Danone.
  - Daniel Carasso (1905–2009), Isaac's son, took over the family business in Spain and established Danone in France and the United States and built the company up to Groupe Danone.
- Albert Karasu or Carasso (1885–1982), founder of the French-language Istanbul newspaper Le Journal d'Orient.
