= Yakup Yahya =

Ottoman–Jewish figure

Personal details
- Born: 1475 Lisbon, Portugal
- Died: Unknown Ottoman Empire

Yakup ben David Tam ibn Yahya (Hebrew: יאקופ יחיא) was born David into a Marrano family in Lisbon, Portugal, in 1475. He later moved to Istanbul to practice his religion (Judaism) more freely, and was regarded as the spiritual leader of all Ottoman Jews, until his death.

== Life and career ==
Yahya immigrated to Istanbul in 1496 with his father to practice their religion (Judaism) more freely. As he soon became famous for his extensive knowledge on the Talmud, he was selected as a member of Bet-Din by the then Hakham Bashi of Istanbul, Eliyahu Mizrahi, and was accepted as the spiritual leader of the Ottoman Jews after Mizrahi's death.

In the debate about whether the Karaites were Jewish or not, he vehemently rejected the thesis that they were not. Also, although he knew Kabbalah well, he objected to its teaching.

Although most of Ibn Yahya's responsas, which were written in Ottoman Turkish, Arabic, and Spanish (languages he spoke), were destroyed in the great fire of Istanbul in 1541, those which managed to survive were published in 1542 under the name Oholei Tam. His most well-known work is Dereh Tamim.
