= Mosè Piccio =

Ottoman lexicographer

Mosè Piccio (Hebrew: משה בן יוסף פיגו, Moshe ben Yosef Figu; d. 1576) was an Ottoman lexicographer. Piccio compiled Zikhron Torat Moshe (Hebrew: זכרון תורת משה), which is a dictionary of aggadic terminology first published in Constantinople in 1552. The dictionary's content reflects the impact of the massive migrations taking place at that time around the Mediterranean Basin.
