= Elijah Capsali =

Cretan rabbi and historian

Elijah ben Elkanah Capsali (Hebrew: אליהו בן אלקנה קפשאלי; c. 1485 – after 1550) was a notable rabbi and historian. Capsali, an important historian of Muslim and Ottoman history, has a medieval historical approach, with early modern subject matter. Capsali's chronicle may be the first example of a diasporic Jew writing a history of their own location (Venice).

== Biography ==
Born c. 1485 in Crete, into a distinguished Romaniote family, the Capsalis had served as heads of the Jewish community on several occasions and distinguished themselves in the study of the Torah and Talmud. His father Elkanah Capsali, served as the head of the Cretan Jewish community, and taught Elijah in his early years. In 1508 Elijah went to Padua, to study in the yeshivah of Judah Minz, who soon died after Capsali's arrival. His studies were interrupted by the occupation of Padua by German troops in 1509, after which he moved to Venice. In 1510 Capsali returned to Crete, where he studied under Isaac Mangelheim. In c. 1528 he became the Chief Rabbi of Crete, during which he associated himself with several great scholars of his time such as Jacob Berab and Joseph Karo. Additionally he wrote several notable historical works, which were praised for their vivid and detailed descriptions of Ottoman Jewry, many of which provide interregnal accounts used by modern historians.

== Works ==
Some of his most famous works are as follows:

- Seder Eliyahu Zuta - a short history of the Ottoman Empire up to his lifetime, with special reference to the Jews. (Note: A partial English translation by Rabbi Dr Shmuel Himmelstein was published in The Expulsion 1492 Chronicles (1992), edited by Dr David Raphael.)
- Divrei ha-Yamim le-Malkhut Venezia - a contemporary account of Venice and the condition of Venetian Jews.
- No'am Ḥoblim - a contemporary account of the ongoings and lives of the great rabbis of his lifetime.
