= Lucien Sciuto =

Ottoman Jewish journalist and Zionist activist (1868–1947)

- Born: 1868; Thessaloniki, Ottoman Empire
- Died: 1947 (aged 78–79); Alexandria, Kingdom of Egypt
- Occupation: Journalist
- Years active: 1890s–1930s
- Known for: founder of L'Aurore

Lucien Sciuto (1868–1947) was a Jewish educator, writer and journalist. Born in Thessaloniki, Ottoman Empire, he worked for various publications in Istanbul and founded a magazine-turned-newspaper L'Aurore which was published in Istanbul and then, in Cairo between 1909 and 1941 with five-year hiatus.

== Early life and education ==
Sciuto was born in Thessaloniki in 1868 into a religious family. He attended the Alliance Israélite Universelle school which he left at age 14.

== Career and activities ==
Sciuto worked for the newspapers in his hometown, including Le Journal de Salonique and Le Moniteur Oriental. His literary career began in 1884 when he published a poetry book entitled Poèmes misanthropiques. He published another poetry book in French and in 1894 he published another book in Paris in 1894, Paternité. Sciuto worked as the editor of a satirical magazine entitled Kalem in Istanbul. In 1909 he founded a French language newspaper, L'Aurore, which was published in Istanbul until 1919.

Sciuto left Istanbul due to his problems with local Jewish leaders and settled in Palestine. There he contributed various Hebrew newspapers. In 1924 he began to live in Cairo and relaunched L'Aurore as a weekly magazine. In Cairo he joined the Société d’Études Historiques Juives d’Égypte and published poems in the literary magazine, including L’Égypte Nouvelle.

Due to financial problems Sciuto left L'Aurore which had been started as a magazine in Cairo to his friend, Jacques Maleh, in 1931. Sciuto died in Alexandria in 1947.
