= Moses Alpalas =

16th-century rabbi and writer

Rabbi Moses Alpalas
- משה אלפלס
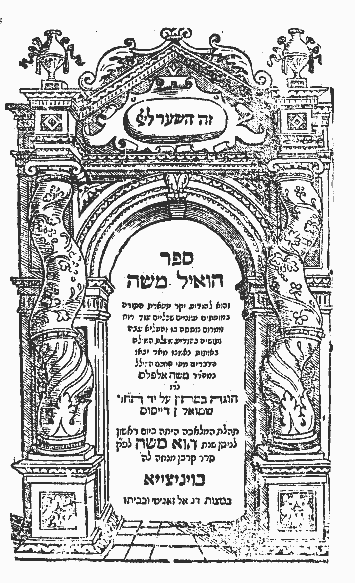
- Title page of "Hoyl Mosheh", Venice, 1597

Personal life
- Occupation: rabbi

Religious life
- Religion: Judaism

Moses Alpalas (also spelled Moses Alfalas; Hebrew: משה אלפלס) was a rabbi and maggid (preacher) who lived at Salonica about the middle of the sixteenth century.

The name Alpalas is probably the same as the Arabic "al-Fallas" (The Money-Dealer).

== Writings ==
Of his many homiletic and theological writings, there have appeared in print, "Wayaḳhel Mosheh" (And Moses Collected), a collection of sermons (Venice, 1597), and "Hoyl Mosheh" (Moses Was Content), apologetic essays on Judaism and the excellence of the Mosaic law (Venice, 1597).
