= Andronikos Kallistos =

Byzantine Greek scholar

Andronikos Kallistos (Greek: Ἀνδρόνικος Καλλίστος; c. 1400 – c. 1476) was a Greek scholar in the Renaissance and a teacher of literature in Bologna, Rome, Florence, Paris and London. He was one of the most able Greek scholars of the 15th century and cousin of the distinguished scholar Theodorus Gaza.

== Biography ==
Kallistos may have been connected with Thessaloniki by birth, but his intellectual formation is better placed in Constantinople.

After the fall of Constantinople in 1453, Kallistos went to Italy where he joined Basilios Bessarion. He taught in Bologna (1464), Rome (1469), Florence, Paris and London (1476). He began the systematic teaching of Greek literature in France. He communicated the principles of Aristotelian thought to many of his students, whose learning won them distinction in Europe. He possessed a large collection of Greek manuscripts. He traveled extensively in northern Europe and died in c. 1476 in London, England.

Among his works is a defence of Theodore of Gaza's positions against the criticisms of Michael Apostolius (Andronicus Callistus Defensio Theodori Gazae adversus Michaelem Apostolium).

== Bibliography ==
- G. Cammelli, 'Andronico Callisto', La Rinascita, 5 (1942), 104-21, 174-214
- Jonathan Harris, Greek Émigrés in the West, 1400-1520 (Camberley: Porphyrogenitus, 1995). ISBN 1-871328-11-X
- John Monfasani, ‘A philosophical text of Andronicus Callistus misattributed to Nicholas Secundinus’, Renaissance Studies in Honour of Craig Hugh Smyth (Florence, 1985), pp. 395-406, reprinted in John Monfasani, Byzantine Scholars in Renaissance Italy: Cardinal Bessarion and other Emigres (Aldershot, 1995), no. XIII
- J. E. Powell, ‘Two letters of Andronicus Callistus to Demetrius Chalcondyles’, Byzantinisch-Neugriechische Jahrbücher 15 (1938), 14-20
