= Ḥayyim Asahel =

- Died: before 1746 Smyrna, Asia Minor, Ottoman Empire

Religious life
- Religion: Judaism
- Residence: Salonica, Macedonia, Ottoman Empire

Ḥayyim Asahel (Hebrew: חיים עשאל; d. before 1746) was a rabbi and author who lived in Salonica during the first half of the eighteenth century.

He was the son of Benjamin Asahel, the chief rabbi of that city. Ḥayyim Asahel was the author of a Hebrew work entitled Sam ḥayyai (Hebrew: סם חיי) ('Spice of My Life'), a collection of addresses and responsa, which was published after his death by his son Benjamin (Salonica, 1746). He lived for some years at Jerusalem, and was commissioned to collect subscriptions throughout Asia Minor for the poor of Palestine. He died at Smyrna while on this mission.

== Bibliography ==
- Asahel, Ḥayyim (1746). Sam ḥayyai [Spice of My Life]. Salonica: Defus Betzalel ha-Levi Ashkenazi.
