= El Jugueton =

Defunct Ladino language magazine

El Jugueton was a Ladino-language satirical journal published from Istanbul. The journal, edited by the Ladino novelist Elia Carmona, was launched after the 1908 Young Turks revolution. El Jugueton was the longest-running satirical Ladino newspaper in the city, and the second longest-running Ladino publication in the city overall after El Tiempo. The magazine folded in 1931.
