= Daniel Carasso =

French businessman (1905–2009)

- Born: 16 December 1905; Salonica, Ottoman Empire
- Died: 17 May 2009 (aged 103); Neuilly-sur-Seine, France
- Education: École supérieure de commerce de Marseille; Pasteur Institute
- Parent: Isaac Carasso

Daniel Carasso (December 16, 1905 – May 17, 2009) was a French member of the prominent Sephardic Jewish Carasso family and the son of Isaac Carasso, founder of the (now) multinational Danone.

== Biography ==
Carasso, son of Isaac Carasso, was born in Salonica, Ottoman Empire (modern Thessaloniki, Greece), where his family had lived for four hundred years following Spain's expulsion of its Jews. In 1916, after the Balkan Wars, the family moved to Barcelona. In 1919, Carasso's father began marketing a yogurt that he named 'Danone' after Daniel, whose nickname was Danon.

In 1923, Carasso enrolled in business school in Marseille, France, and studied bacteriology at the Pasteur Institute. He took over the family business. In 1939, he opened a branch in France.

He settled in the United States in 1941 after fleeing France when it was invaded by the Nazis. Carasso returned to France in 1951.

== Death ==
He died at his home in Paris at the age of 103.

== Dannon Yogurt ==
In 1942, he formed a partnership with two family friends, Joe Metzger, a Swiss-born Spanish businessman, and his son Juan. They bought a small Greek yogurt company, Oxy-Gala, and founded Dannon Milk Products in Bronx, New York. In 1947, Dannon added jam to its yogurt as a concession to American tastes and succeeded in growing sales to a broad market. He expanded the business into cheeses and other foodstuffs, and bought the American company from Beatrice Foods in 1981, changing the name to Groupe Danone.
