= Elia Carmona =

Ladino Turkish author

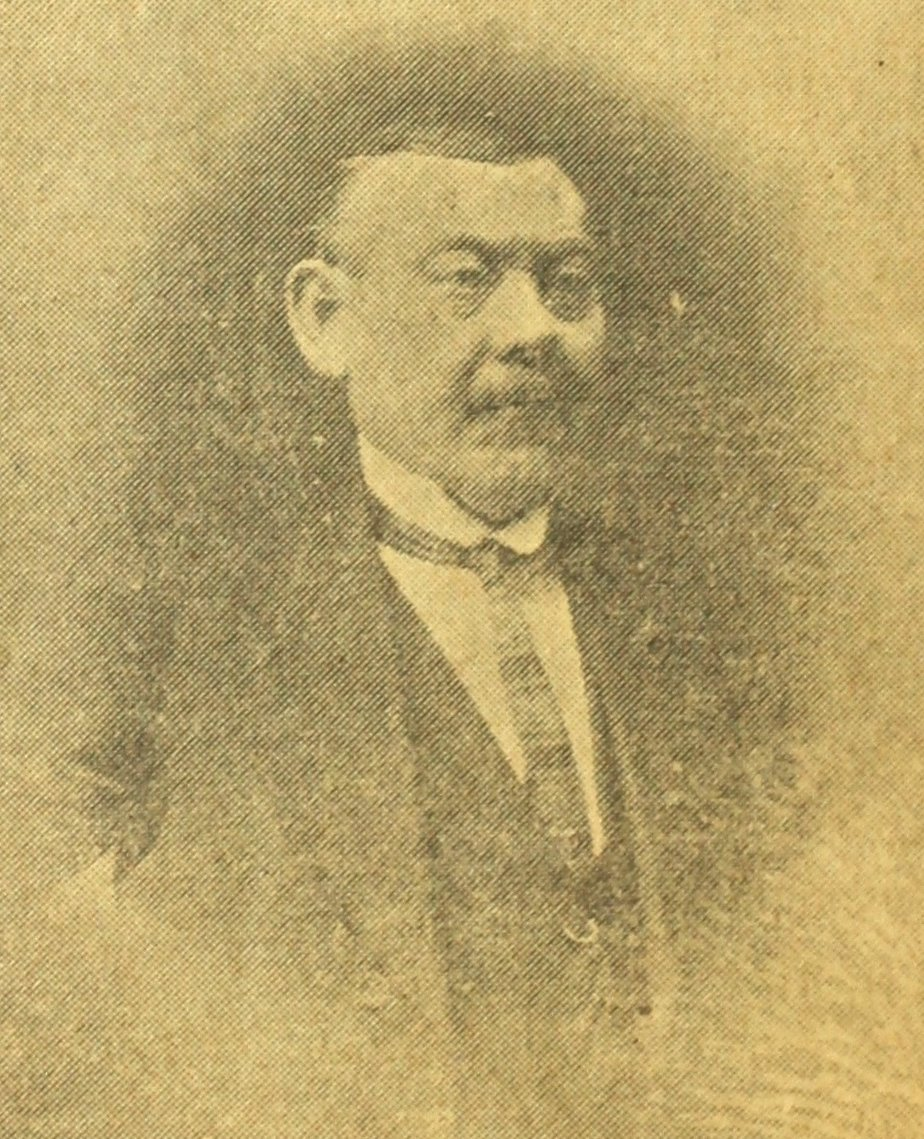
- Carmona in 1926
- Born: October 21, 1869; Constantinople
- Died: 1931 (aged 61–62)
- Occupations: Ladino language author and journalist
- Known for: Founder and editor of El Jugueton

Elia Rafael Carmona (Ladino: אליה רפאל קארמונה; October 21, 1869 – 1931) was a Ladino language author and journalist from the Ottoman Empire. A native of Constantinople, Carmona was the most prolific known author of original novels in Ladino (also known as Judeo-Spanish), writing dozens of novels and novellas (romansos) throughout his lifetime. Carmona was also the founder and editor of El Jugueton (איל ג'וגיטון), a periodical dedicated to humor and satire. His prolific corpus of work is representative of the emerging interest in secular literature among the Sephardic Jews of the Ottoman Empire in the late 19th and early 20th centuries.

== Life and career ==
Elia Carmona was born in Constantinople (now Istanbul) in 1869, to a privileged Sephardic Ottoman Jewish family. Despite the family's relatively prominent status, his parents suffered financial hardships throughout his childhood. In his youth, he received a traditional Jewish education and then studied briefly at an Alliance Israélite Universelle school until his parents had to remove him from school due to their financial difficulties. Over the following years, he worked in various professions, including working as a French tutor for wealthy families and peddling cigarettes and matches. In 1893, he became engaged to a woman named Rachel, the daughter of his neighbors. According to his memoir, however, if his parents had not persuaded him to continue the engagement, he would have chosen to marry another young woman named Rosa, the daughter of a wealthy merchant.

In 1895, Carmona traveled to Thessaloniki hoping to find a livelihood there and to save money for a trip to Paris. He was forced to cancel his plans and return to Constantinople after receiving word that his father had contracted a serious illness. It was during this period that he probably began, with the encouragement of his mother, literary writing. His first writings are folk tales (consejas), but he soon began composing original romances and novels. Ottoman censorship in Constantinople imposed restrictions on the publication of some of his books, and, in order to evade censorship, he traveled to cities such as Rhodes and Edirne in the hopes that he could publish there. Eventually, however, he returned to Constantinople after learning of his father's death. In 1901, he married his fiancée after an engagement of almost a decade. About a year later, following the decision of the Ottoman censors to completely ban the publication of books dealing with topics such as love, romance, and crime, Carmona decided to travel to Egypt, where there was a thriving and free press at the time. He arrived in Alexandria on March 23, 1902, and in the following months tried to publish a number of his books. He also met with other Ottoman Jewish writers and intellectuals living in Egypt at the time.

During his months in Egypt, he lived in great poverty and was reduced to homelessness and begging. He used his family ties to try to earn money, and more than once solicited funds from his relatives on the pretext that he intended to travel back to Constantinople, but instead used the money to finance his continued stay in Egypt. Eventually he returned to Constantinople and began working as a typist for the journalist and Ladino writer David Fresco and his important newspaper El Tiempo (איל טיימפו - "Time"). In parallel with his work as a typist from 1903 to 1908, he continued to compose literary works, sending them for publication in printing houses in Jerusalem and in Egypt to overcome censorship.

After the Young Turk Revolution in 1908, most of the Ottoman censorship restrictions were lifted, which allowed for greater freedom of publication for literature and journalism in the Ottoman Empire. In the same year, Carmona founded a satirical magazine called El Jugueton ("The Joker"), which gained popularity and was published for over two decades (1908-1931), making it one of the longest-running Ladino magazines. Carmona published many romances and stories in his journal and wrote editorials promoting modern education and the learning of Hebrew and other foreign languages. Unlike other writers and journalists of the time, Carmona for the most part refrained from political activity. Before 1908, the Ottoman government interrogated him on suspicion of ties with the Young Turks but found him innocent. One of the only public political steps he took was his satirical critique of Rabbi Chaim Nahum, who was the Grand Rabbi of the Ottoman Empire at the time. Carmona later wrote that Rabbi Nahum's attempt to silence him attracted more readers to the journal in those few months of struggle than he had accumulated in all its previous years of publication.

Throughout his literary career, Carmona wrote dozens of novels. His books gained popularity among Ladino-speaking Jewish communities, and his work is considered one of the most important symbols of the golden age of modern Ladino literature.

Carmona died childless in 1931 and was buried in the Jewish cemetery in Constantinople. Several details in his biography remain controversial among scholars to this day, such as the year he published his first work (between 1893 and 1901) and the number of books attributed to him. Over the years, some of his books have been translated into other languages, including an English translation of his novel La mujer onesta (לה מוז׳יר אוניסטה) as The Chaste Wife.
