= Aaron ben Isaac Hamon =

18-century doctor and printer

Aaron ben Isaac Hamon was an 18th-century doctor and printer. He served as physician to the Ottoman royal court.
