= Qarasuqumlaq =

- Municipality
- Location within Azerbaijan
- Coordinates: 40°39′14″N 47°22′46″E
- Country: Azerbaijan
- Rayon: Agdash

Population
  - Total: 652
- Time zone: UTC+4 (AZT)
  - Summer (DST): UTC+5 (AZT)

Qarasuqumlaq (also, Qarasugumlag, Karasukumlak and Karasu-Kumlakh) is a village and municipality in the Agdash Rayon of Azerbaijan. It has a population of 652.
