= Theodorus Gaza =

Greek Renaissance humanist scholar

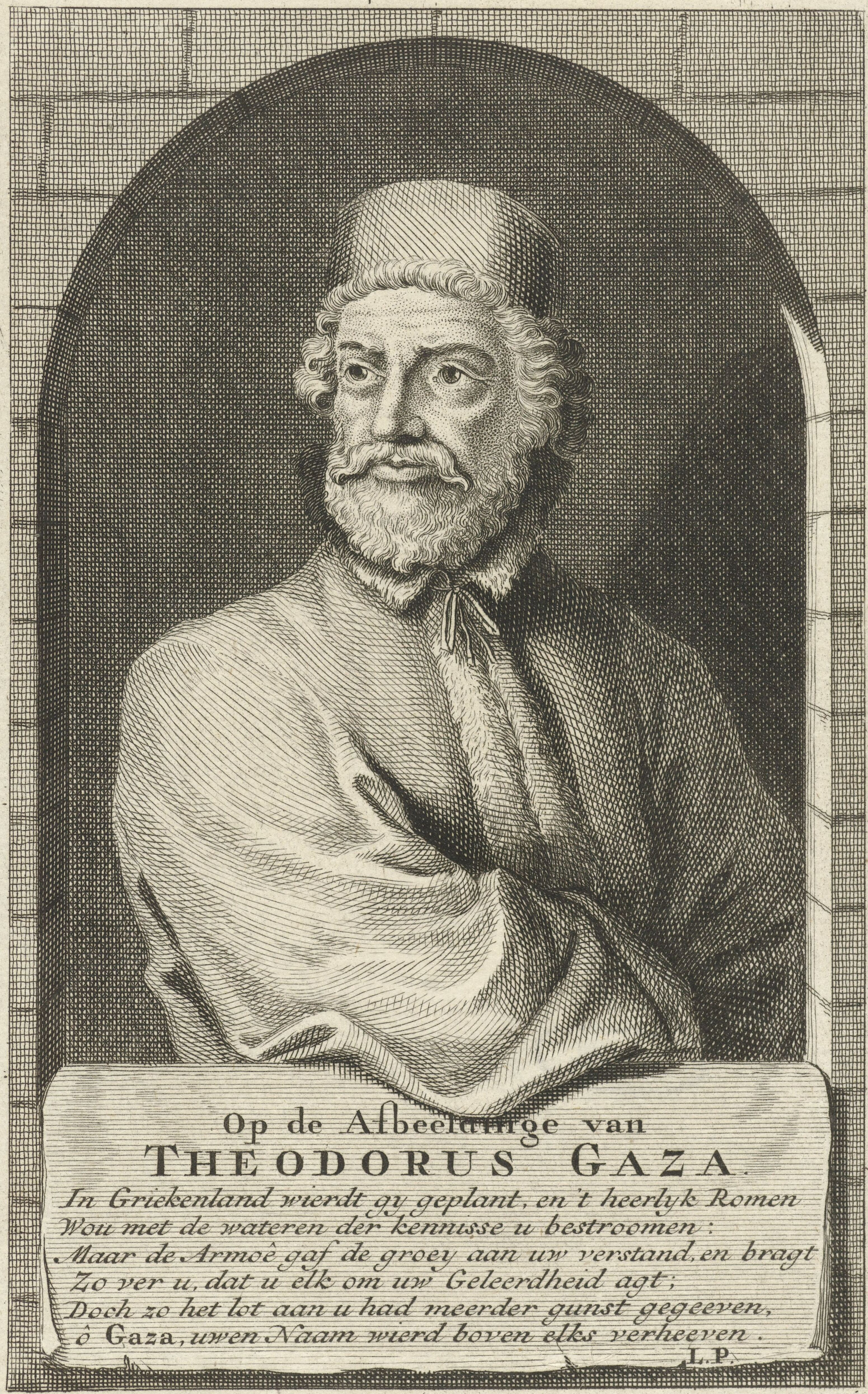
- A portrait of Theodore Gaza
- Born: c. 1398; Thessaloniki, Eyalet of Rumelia, Ottoman Empire
- Died: c. 1475; San Giovanni a Piro, Campania, Kingdom of Naples
- Occupations: Greek literature, philosophy and humanism
- Writing career
- Movement: Italian Renaissance

Theodorus Gaza (Greek: Θεόδωρος Γαζῆς, Theodoros Gazis; Italian: Teodoro Gaza; Latin: Theodorus Gazes), also called Theodore Gazis or by the epithet Thessalonicensis and Thessalonikeus (c. 1398 – c. 1475), was a Greek humanist and translator of Aristotle, one of the Greek scholars who were the leaders of the revival of learning in the 15th century (the Palaeologan Renaissance).

== Life ==
Theodorus Gaza was born a Greek in an illustrious family in Thessaloniki, Macedonia in about c. 1400 when the city was under its first period of Turkish rule (it was restored to Byzantine rule in 1403). On the final capture of his native city by the Turks in 1430 he escaped to Italy. In December 1440 he was in Pavia, where he became acquainted with Iacopo da San Cassiano, who introduced him to his master Vittorino da Feltre. During a three years' residence in Mantua where Vittorino held the celebrated humanistic school "La Giocosa", he rapidly acquired a competent knowledge of Latin under his teaching, supporting himself meanwhile by giving lessons in Greek, and by copying manuscripts of the ancient classics.

In 1447 he became professor of Greek in the newly founded University of Ferrara, to which students in great numbers from all parts of Italy were soon attracted by his fame as a teacher. His students there included Rodolphus Agricola. He had taken some part in the councils which were held in Siena (1423), Ferrara (1438), and Florence (1439), with the object of bringing about a reconciliation between the Greek and Latin Churches; and in 1450, at the invitation of Pope Nicholas V, he went to Rome, where he was for some years employed by his patron in making Latin translations from Aristotle and other Greek authors. In Rome, he continued his teaching activities: it was reported that on one occasion Pope Sixtus IV commissioned Gaza to translate Aristotle's works into Latin, with the pay of a number of gold pieces; however on receiving the pay Gaza was insulted at the amount paid, and furiously cast the money into the Tiber river. Amongst his students were fellow Byzantine Greeks Demetrius Chalcondyles, a leading scholar of the Renaissance period and Andronicus Callistus, a cousin of Theodore Gaza's.

After the death of Nicholas (1455), being unable to make a living at Rome, Gaza moved to Naples, where he enjoyed the patronage of Alphonso the Magnanimous for two years (1456–1458). Shortly afterwards he was appointed by Cardinal Bessarion to a benefice in Calabria, where the later years of his life were spent, and where he died about 1475 and was buried in the Basilian monastery of San Giovanni a Piro.

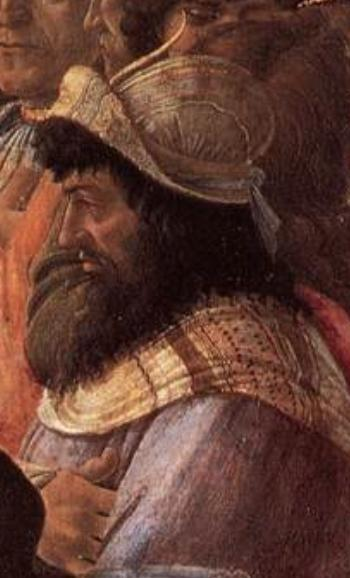
Theodorus Gaza as depicted by Botticelli in the "Adoration of the Magi" in the Uffizi Gallery of Florence, Italy.

After Gaza's death he was remembered by renaissance writers and praised for his skills; a letter written to Pope Sixtus IV by Ermolao Barbaro in 1480 includes a detailed appraisal of Gaza's translating abilities:

Not long ago, Your Holiness, we suffered a great and incomparable loss in the person of Theodore Gaza. That Greek man outdid all Latins in the task of writing and translating. If he had lived longer, he would have enriched the Latin language in this field as well. He did that indeed in those most perfect books of Aristotle’s On Animals and Theophrastus’ On Plants. In my view, he is the only one to challenge antiquity itself. I have set myself to honour and imitate this man. I admit and I confess that I was helped by his writings. I read him with no less curiosity than I read M. Tullius, Pliny, Columella, Varro, Seneca, Apuleius, and the others that one needs to examine in this kind of study

— Ermolao Barbaro letter to Pope Sixtus IV, 1480

In the campaign waged by Plethon against Aristotelianism he contributed his share to the defence. His influence on humanists was considerable, in the success with which he taught Greek language and literature. At Ferrara he founded an academy to offset the influence of the Platonic academy founded by Plethon at Florence.

== Works ==
His translations were superior, both in accuracy and style, to the versions in use before his time. He devoted particular attention to the translation and exposition of Aristotle's works on natural science.

Gaza stood high in the opinion of most of his learned contemporaries, but still higher in that of the scholars of the succeeding generation. His Greek grammar (in four books), written in Greek, first printed at Venice in 1495, and afterwards partially translated by Erasmus in 1521, although in many respects defective, especially in its syntax, was for a long time the leading textbook. His translations into Latin were very numerous, including:

- Problemata, De partibus animalium and De generatione animalium of Aristotle
- the Historia Plantarum of Theophrastus
- the Problemata of Alexander of Aphrodisias
- the De instruendis aciebus of Aelian
- the De compositione verborum of Dionysius of Halicarnassus
- some of the Homilies of John Chrysostom.

He also turned into Greek Cicero's De senectute and Somnium Scipionis with much success, in the opinion of Erasmus; with more elegance than exactitude, according to the colder judgment of modern scholars. He was the author also of two small treatises entitled De mensibus and De origine Turcarum.

The flowering plant genus Gazania, of southern Africa, is named after him.

== See also ==
- Byzantine scholars in Renaissance
- List of Macedonians (Greek)
