= David Samuel Carasso =

David Samuel Carasso (Greek: Δαβίδ Σάμιουελ Καράσσο) was a nineteenth-century Jewish merchant, traveler, and writer. He was a member of the Carasso family, a prominent Sephardic Jewish family in Ottoman Salonica.

On the occasion of a business trip to Yemen, Arabia in 1874, he studied the situation of the Jews of that region. He published an account of his travels in a volume written in Judæo-Spanish, entitled Zikron Teman ó el Viage en el Yémen (Constantinople, 1875). He traversed the whole of the interior of Arabia, including Sada, Aseer, Sanaa, etc., and was especially interested in the last-named community. In order to ameliorate the condition of the Jews of Yemen, he wrote to the Anglo-Jewish Association and to the chief rabbi of Constantinople, Moses Halévy, whereupon the latter sent Isaac Saul, a rabbi of Constantinople, to Sanaa as chief rabbi.
