= Emmanuel Carasso =

Ottoman-Jewish lawyer (1862–1934)

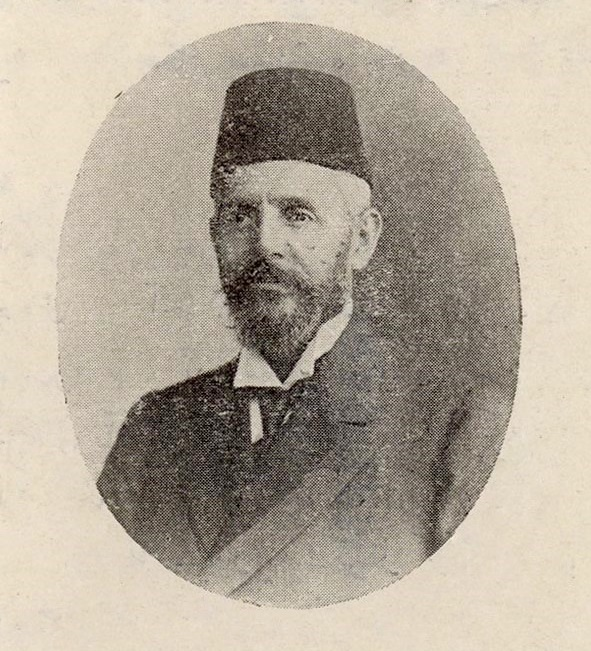

Member of the Chamber of Deputies
- In office 1908–1912
- Constituency: Salonica

Personal details
- Born: 1862 Salonica, Sanjak of Salonica, Salonica Eyalet, Ottoman Empire
- Died: 1934 (aged 71–72) Trieste, Italy
- Resting place: Jewish cemetery in Arnavutköy
- Party: Committee of Union and Progress
- Relations: Isaac Carasso (nephew)
- Occupation: Politician

Emmanuel Carasso or Emanuel Karasu (1862 in Salonica – 1934 in Trieste) was an Ottoman lawyer and a member of the prominent Sephardic Jewish Carasso family of Ottoman Salonica (now Thessaloniki, Greece). He was a prominent member of the Young Turks. The name is also spelled Karaso, Karassu, Karso, Karsu and Karasso. The form Karasu is a Turkification of his name, meaning literally 'dark water'.

Emmanuel's nephew Isaac Carasso, also born in Ottoman Salonica, was a physician who created Danone yogurt in Barcelona in 1919.

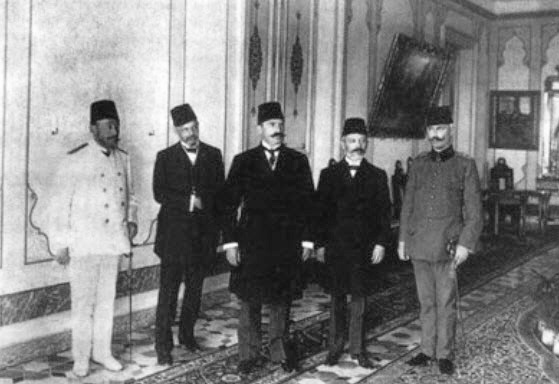
Delegation of the Ottoman parliament to inform Sultan Abdul Hamid II of his deposition. Left to right: Rear-admiral Arif Hikmet Pasha, Emmanuel Carasso (Emanuel Karasu Efendi), Esad Pasha Toptani, Aram Efendi and Colonel Galip Bey (Pasiner), April 1909.

Karasu was a member (some sources say founder) and later president of the Macedonia Risorta Masonic Lodge in Thessaloniki and pioneered the masonic movement within the Ottoman Empire. Masonic lodges and other secret societies in Salonica were meeting places for sympathizers of the Young Turks, including Talat Pasha. Karasu was one of the first non-Muslim members of the Ottoman Freedom Society, which later became part of the Committee of Union and Progress (CUP); when the CUP came to power, he became the Salonica deputy in the Ottoman parliament. He was offered various positions in the Ottoman government, but turned them down. Karasu was one of the four men who told Sultan Abdul Hamid II of his deposition in April 1909. He worked for the cooperation of various Jewish organizations in the Ottoman Empire, including B'nai B'rith, and insisted that Ottoman Jews were Ottoman first and Jews second. He was a member of the committee which negotiated the treaty ending the Italo-Turkish War and of the committee to internationalize the city of Salonika.

Karasu contributed money to Minber, the newspaper of Mustafa Kemal Atatürk and Fethi Okyar. Atatürk held Carasso in high regard, delivering speeches that appreciated his work enhance humanity and spiritual elevation in Freemasonry.

== Death ==
He died in 1934, and is buried in the Jewish cemetery in Arnavutköy, Istanbul.
