= Le Jeune Turc =

Le Jeune Turc (The Young Turk in French) was a French language pro-CUP Zionist newspaper published in the late Ottoman Empire. It was one of two leading Zionist publications in Istanbul. The other one was L'Aurore which was also published in French. However, the circulation of Le Jeune Turc was much higher than that of L'Aurore, 15,000 copies and 1,500 copies, respectively. The newspaper had Vladimir Jabotinsky, a prominent member of the Zionist Organization, as editor-in-chief, and included the participation of such important Jewish figures as the revolutionary Alexander Parvus.

Le Jeune Turc sympathized with the revolution of 1908 for its liberal and secular principles, seeing it as an opportunity for the emancipation of Jews and other minorities. However, with the outbreak of World War I, Jabotinsky aligned himself with the Entente and sought support from the British Empire for the establishment of a Jewish Legion against the Ottomans. This caused Le Jeune Turc to be banned in 1915 and the Zionists to be perceived as traitors and subversives and persecuted by the authorities.
