= L'Aurore (1909–1941) =

Jewish publication (1909–1941)

- Categories: Political magazine
- Frequency: Weekly
- Founder: Lucien Sciuto
- Founded: 1909
- Final issue: 1941
- Country: Ottoman Empire; Egypt
- Based in: Istanbul; Cairo
- Language: French

L'Aurore (French for 'The Dawn'; IPA: [loʁɔʁ]) was a French language publication which was launched by a Thessaloniki-born Jewish journalist Lucien Sciuto in Istanbul in 1909 and published there until 1923. Sciutto restarted L'Aurore as weekly magazine in Cairo in 1924 which appeared until 1941.

== History ==
L'Aurore was published first in Istanbul as a newspaper and then, in Cairo as a weekly magazine. All issues of the publication were archived by the National Library of Israel.

== Istanbul (1909–1923) ==
L'Aurore was established by Lucien Sciuto as a newspaper in Istanbul in 1909 following the Young Turk Revolution. He was a Jewish and Zionist activist from Thessaloniki. The paper was edited by Lucien Sciuto and was one of two leading Zionist publications in Istanbul. The other one was Le Jeune Turc which was also published in French. However, the circulation of Le Jeune Turc was much higher than that of L'Aurore, 15,000 copies and 1,500 copies, respectively.

L'Aurore ceased publication in 1919 when Sciuto left Istanbul for Palestine. The reason for the closure of the paper and Sciuto's leaving Istanbul was his disputes with the leaders of the local Jewish community. In 1921 the license of L'Aurore was bought by the British authorities and was managed by a retired British Army captain. It was renamed as Turquie Nouvelle in November 1922 and existed until the end of the occupation of Istanbul in 1923.

== Cairo (1924–1941) ==
Sciuto settled in Cairo in 1924 and relaunched L'Aurore as a weekly magazine which became one of the most read magazines among Jewish Cairene readers of Greek and Turkish origins and was the contender of another Cairo-based weekly magazine entitled Israël. There was an Alexandria edition of L'Aurore.

L'Aurore was supported by the United Palestine Appeal based in London from October 1924 to 1931. When the support ended, the magazine experienced financial difficulty, and Sciuto's colleague, Jacques Maleh, took charge of the publication. A funding commission was formed which was led by Simon Mani to save the publication. This attempt was a success and made it possible for the magazine to continue. Leon Castro, a Jewish lawyer and public figure who had emigrant from the Ottoman Empire, acquired some shares of the magazine. He was among the founders of the League for the Struggle against Anti-Semitism, an organization established after the increase of Adolf Hitler's power in 1933. Castro made the magazine an organ of this organization. In 1941 L'Aurore closed down due to the problems resulted from World War II.
