= Le Journal d'Orient =

Weekly French language newspaper in Ottoman Empire and Turkey (1918–1971)

- Type: Weekly newspaper
- Founder: Albert Karasu
- Founded: 1918
- Ceased publication: 1971
- Language: French
- Headquarters: Constantinople; Istanbul
- Country: Ottoman Empire; Turkey

Le Journal d'Orient (French: The Gazette of the East) was a long-term weekly newspaper that existed between 1918 and 1971 with a two-year interruption first in the Ottoman Empire and then in Turkey.

== History and profile ==
Le Journal d'Orient was established by Albert Karasu in 1918 in Constantinople, Ottoman Empire. He was a Jewish journalist from Thessaloniki. Karasu also edited the paper which came out weekly in Istanbul. It ceased publication in 1924, but was restarted in 1926. Le Journal d'Orient permanently folded in 1971.

Major contributors of the paper included Angele Loreley, Willy Sperco, Lea Zolotarevsky, Marsel Shalom, Moshe Benbasat (Benbasan) and Aaron Zonana. The paper had a Zionist political stance at the initial period, but it later faded. Instead, Le Journal d'Orient had a cultural Levantine approach. Following the liberation of İzmir from the Greek invasion in September 1922 and the Treaty of Lausanne on 24 July 1923, the paper began to support Mustafa Kemal's movement which would establish the Republic of Turkey on 29 October 1923.

As of 1923 the paper sold nearly 4,000 copies.

In 2018 a book was published about the newspaper in relation to the social life of minorities in Turkey.
