= Albert Karasu =

Albert Karasu or Carasso (1885–1982) was a Jewish-Turkish journalist born in Ottoman Salonica.

== Biography ==
He studied political science at the Paris Institute of Political Studies and went on to found the French-language Istanbul newspaper Le Journal d'Orient in 1918. In 1922–23 he covered the Lausanne Treaty negotiations in Lausanne, Switzerland.

The newspaper was closed down in 1971.
