= Isaac Carasso =

Spanish founder of Groupe Danone

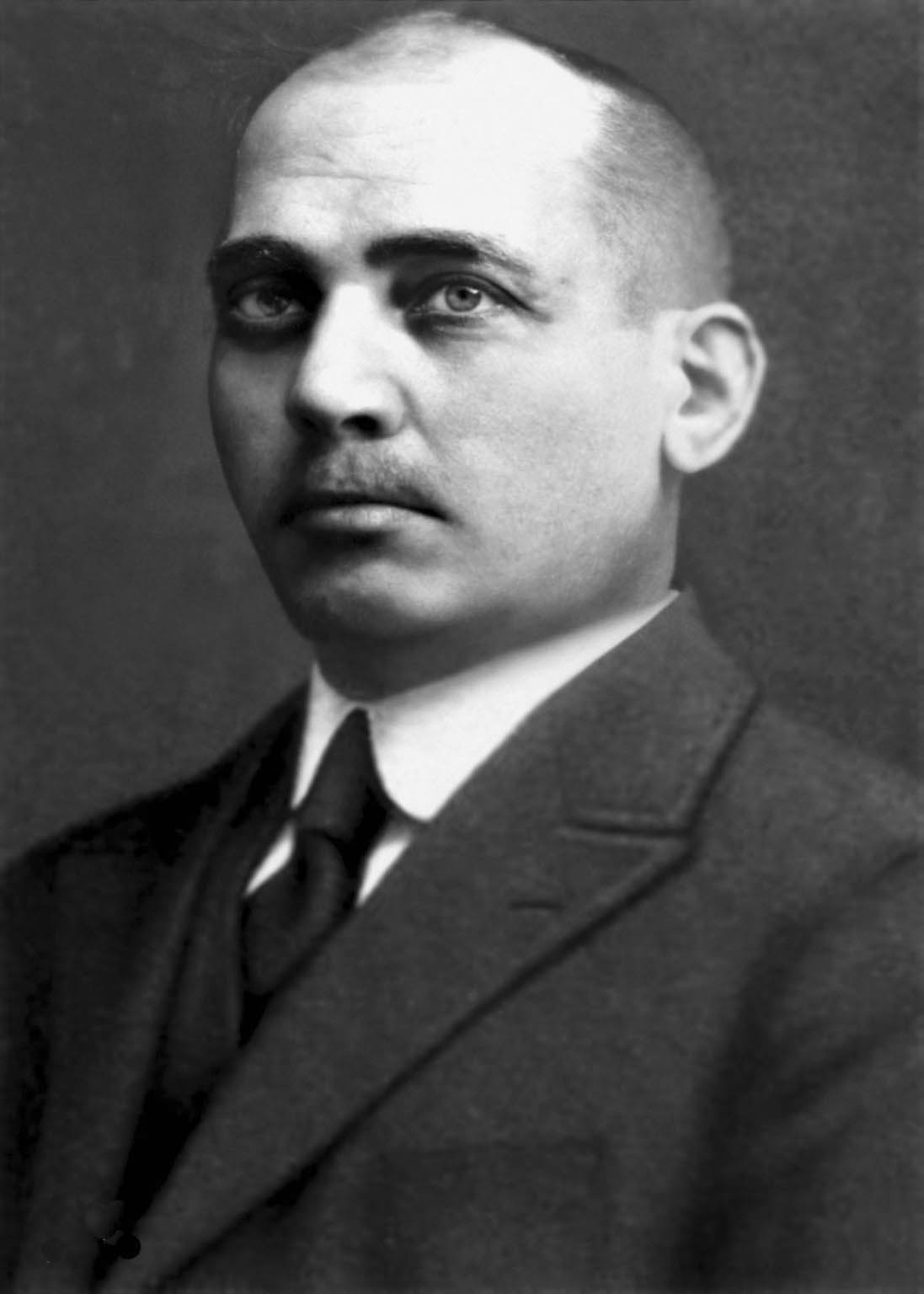
- Born: 1874; Thessaloniki, Ottoman Empire
- Died: April 19, 1939 (aged 64–65)
- Occupation: Entrepreneur
- Known for: Founder of Danone
- Children: Daniel Carasso
- Relatives: Emmanuel Carasso (uncle)

Isaac Carasso (1874 – 19 April 1939) was a member of the prominent Sephardic Jewish Carasso (Karasu) family of Ottoman Salonica (modern Thessaloniki, Greece). After immigrating to Barcelona, he started a yogurt factory which later became Groupe Danone.

== Biography ==
Carasso was born in Salonica in 1874. In 1916, after the Balkan Wars, he moved his family to Barcelona.

He noticed that many young children suffered from digestive and intestinal problems. Inspired by the work of Ilya Ilyich Mechnikov, who had popularized sour milk as a health food, and recalling that such health conditions were treated with yogurt in the Balkans, he imported cultures from Bulgaria or used "pure cultures that had been isolated in Paris" at Mechnikov's laboratory at the Institut Pasteur. Since yogurt was not well known then in Western Europe, he initially sold it as a medicine, through pharmacies.

In 1919, he founded the company which would later become Groupe Danone in Barcelona when he opened a small yogurt business named "Danone", a variation on the nickname of his son, Daniel. Carasso perfected the first industrial process for making yogurt.

His son Daniel Carasso took over the family business in Spain and established Danone in France and later in the United States (as Dannon).

Carasso died in France in 1939.
