= Seasongood =

Seasongood is a surname. Notable people with the surname include:

- Jacob Seasongood (c. 1812–1884), American merchant and banker
- Murray Seasongood (1878–1983), American lawyer and politician
