= Avenue d'Iéna =

Tree-lined avenue in the 16th arrondissement of Paris

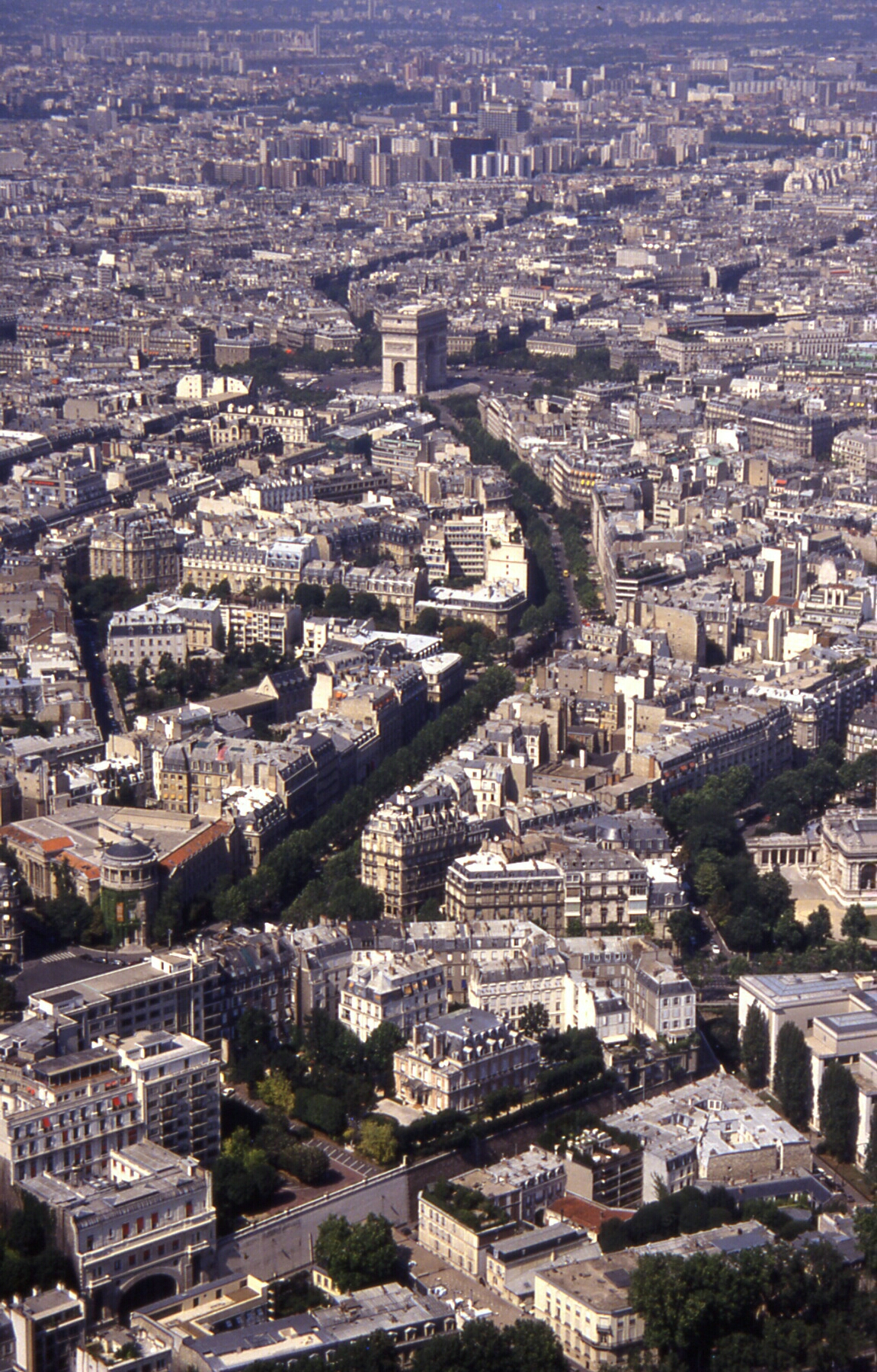
- View from the third floor of the Eiffel Tower

- Location within Paris
- Length: 1,140 m (3,740 ft)
- Width: 36 m (118 ft)
- Arrondissement: 16th
- Quarter: Chaillot
- Coordinates: 48°52′06.00″N 2°17′44.50″E
- From: 6 avenue Albert De Mun
- To: place Charles de Gaulle (place de l'Etoile)

Construction
- Completed: 6 March 1858
- Denomination: 2 March 1864

The Avenue d'Iéna (French pronunciation: [avny djena]) is a tree-lined avenue in the 16th arrondissement of Paris, running from the Trocadéro (Avenue Albert-de-Mun) to the Place de l'Étoile. Passing through the Place d'Iéna, the Place de l'Amiral de Grasse, the Place de l'Uruguay and the Place Richard de Coudenhove Kalergi on the way. It is named after the neighbouring bridge across the Seine, the Pont d'Iéna (itself named after the Battle of Iena). It has a length of 1,150 metres (0.71 mi) and an average width of 35 metres (115 ft).

The avenue is intersected by:

1. At the Place d'Iéna: Avenue du Président Wilson, Rue de Longchamp, Rue Boissière, Avenue Pierre 1er de Serbie;
2. At the Place de l'Amiral de Grasse: Rue de Lubeck, Place des États-Unis/Square Thomas Jefferson, Rue de Bassano, Rue Georges Bizet, Rue Freycinet;
3. At the Place de l'Uruguay: Rue Galilée, Rue Jean Giraudoux;
4. At the Place Richard de Coudenhove Kalergi: Rue Auguste Vacquerie, Rue Jean Giraudoux;
5. Rue Newton;
6. Rue Dumont d'Urville;
7. Rue De la Perouse;
8. Rue De Presbourg.

The closest metro stations are:

- Iéna near the southern end of the Place d'Iéna.
- Charles de Gaulle–Étoile at the northern end of the Place Charles de Gaulle - Étoile.

== History ==
On 2 March 1864, the Avenue d'Iéna replaced the former Rue des Batailles, which ran between the Avenue Albert-de-Mun and the Place d'Iéna.

The Rue des Batailles had been a street in the village of Chaillot, engulfed by the expanding Paris in 1786. For some years afterwards, two town boundaries of Chaillot could be seen at the wall of sieur Lélu and the house of sieur Jamard. The street housed several hospitals and a private lunatic asylum was set up in the house once occupied by the Chevalier Pierre Bayard du Terrail. The chemist Charles Derosne (1779–1846), worked in 7 rue des Batailles at the extraction of sugar from sugarbeet.

On 20 December 1961, the name Place de l'Uruguay was given to the intersection of the Rue Galilée and the Rue Jean Giraudoux with the avenue.

== Composition ==
- n° 1 : Palais d'Iéna, a classified monument partly constructed by Auguste Perret including a rotunda.
- n° 2 (corner of the Avenue d'Iéna and the Avenue Albert-de-Mun): Site where the mansion of politician Daniel Wilson was erected. It then became then the private residence of the ambassador of the United States. This was subsequently demolished, giving place to a modern building, leaving only the enclosing wall surmounted by grilles. This building is currently the Cultural Centre of the Korean Embassy (in French and Korean).
- n° 4: Hôtel Sanchez de Larragoiti was built in 1897-1898 by architect Xavier Schoellkopf for Joaquim Sanchez de Larragoiti. The original architect was Édward Georgé who died in 1897. The house was probably the first masterpiece of Art Nouveau architecture in Paris. It was sold in 1907 and transformed by architect Gustave Rives who removed almost all the Art Nouveau decorations and replaced them with Louis XV style, replacing Schoellkopf's signature with his own. The house was featured with illustrations in La Construction Moderne, 12, 20 and 27 January 1900, available to view at the library of the Cité de l'Architecture in Paris.
- n° 6: Hôtel de Cambacérès: I retain a very exact memory , wrote André Becq de Fouquières, of the balls held in this beautiful residence during the spring of 1913 and I still see the Count of Jarnac, the host's uncle, receiving the masked ladies, in their periwinkle-coloured dominos, handing their personal invitation cards to him and dissimulating anonymity under velvet and silk. On the terrace, the countess Stanislas de Montebello helped her brother do the honors for the evening. There was all the nobility of France, many diplomats; and I remember that this night I saw for the last time before the war, in which they were to play such a part, the princes Sixte and Xavier of Bourbon-Parma. (Mon Paris et ses Parisiens, 1953, p. 144). This building is currently the Iranian Embassy.
- n° 8: Ex mansion of the Philippe family. It also was the Paris residence of the baron Philippe de Rothschild who used to rent the first floor. It is now part of The Shangri-La Hotel.
- n° 10: Mansion of Prince Roland Bonaparte. Sir Charles Mendl and Lady Mendl occupied an apartment there. The painter Jean-Gabriel Domergue had his studio here. This is probably the site No. 12, rue des Batailles in which Balzac had a flat in 1834. Today this building is the head office of Ubifrance, the French agency for the international development of companies. In 2009 it reopened as a luxury five-star hotel: The Shangri-La Hotel Paris.
- n° 11: A building on the site of the mansion of Charles Ephrussi.
- n° 17: Houses the German Goethe Institute (in French and German).
- n° 19: A private mansion built in 1913, in the neo-classic style, by René Sergent for Alfred Heidelbach which currently houses the galleries of the Japanese and Chinese Panthéon Bouddhique of the Guimet Museum.
- n° 30: Houses the Union Équestre d'Île de France, the equestrian union. Also in the building are Fédération Internationale de Tourisme Équestre, Fédération Française d'Équitation (FFE), Délégation Nationale au Tourisme Équestre (DNTE) and Ligue Française pour la Protection du Cheval et du Poney
- n° 38: An interesting mansion in the Renaissance style built for the politician George Cochery, erected by the architect Charles Letrosne and transformed into a residential building.
- n° 40: Is the Centre Félix-Grat one of the centres of the IRHT (Institut de recherche et d’histoire des textes) the French research centre for texts, a branch of the CNRS (Centre national de la recherche scientifique).
- n° 49: A private mansion constructed in 1897 by Ernest Sanson for Maurice Kann on the site of a stone-built house which belonged to the Doctor Samuel Jean de Pozzi. The building remains to this day, though divided among several companies.
- n° 50: This building is currently the Embassy of the Sultanate of Oman.
- n° 51: A private mansion constructed in 1897 by Ernest Sanson for Rodolphe Kann, transformed for the businessman Calouste Gulbenkian by the architect Emmanuel Pontremoli and the firm of Mewes and Davis. It houses the Portuguese Fondation Calouste Gulbenkian (in French).
- n° 56: Mansion of Rochefoucauld (corner of the Avenue d'Iéna and the Rue Georges Bizet): This building is currently the Egyptian Embassy.

== Fiction ==
- Christopher Newman in The American by Henry James dined with Mr. and Mrs. Tristram at their apartment on the avenue.
- In the James Bond book, Thunderball, commenting on the wealth of the street Ian Fleming writes that "too many of the landlords and tenants in the Avenue d'Iéna have names ending in 'escou,' 'ovitch,' 'ski,' and 'stein'".
