= Panthéon Bouddhique =

Wing of Guimet Museum in Paris

Coordinates: 48°51′59″N 2°17′40″E

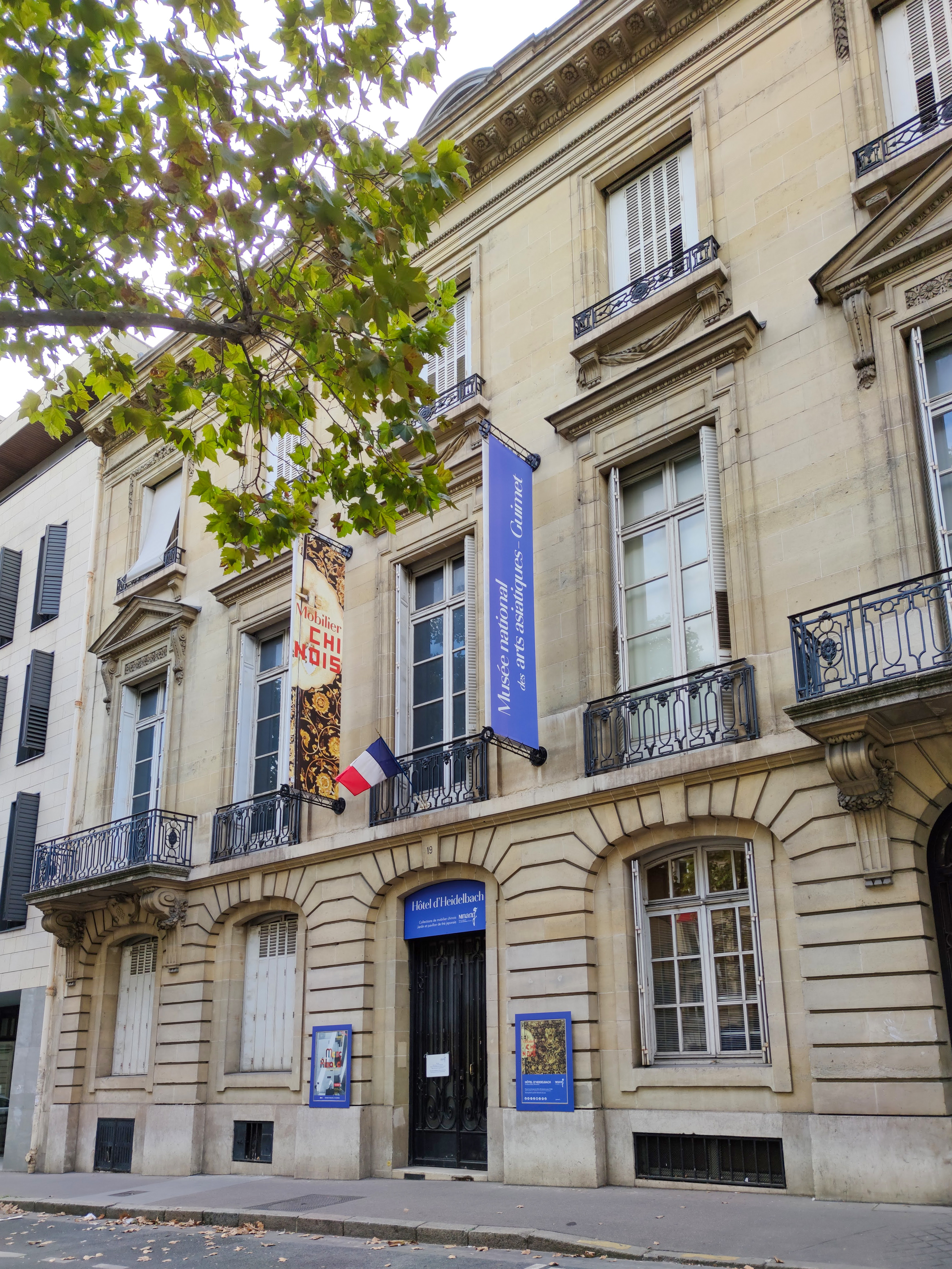
Hôtel d'Heidelbach

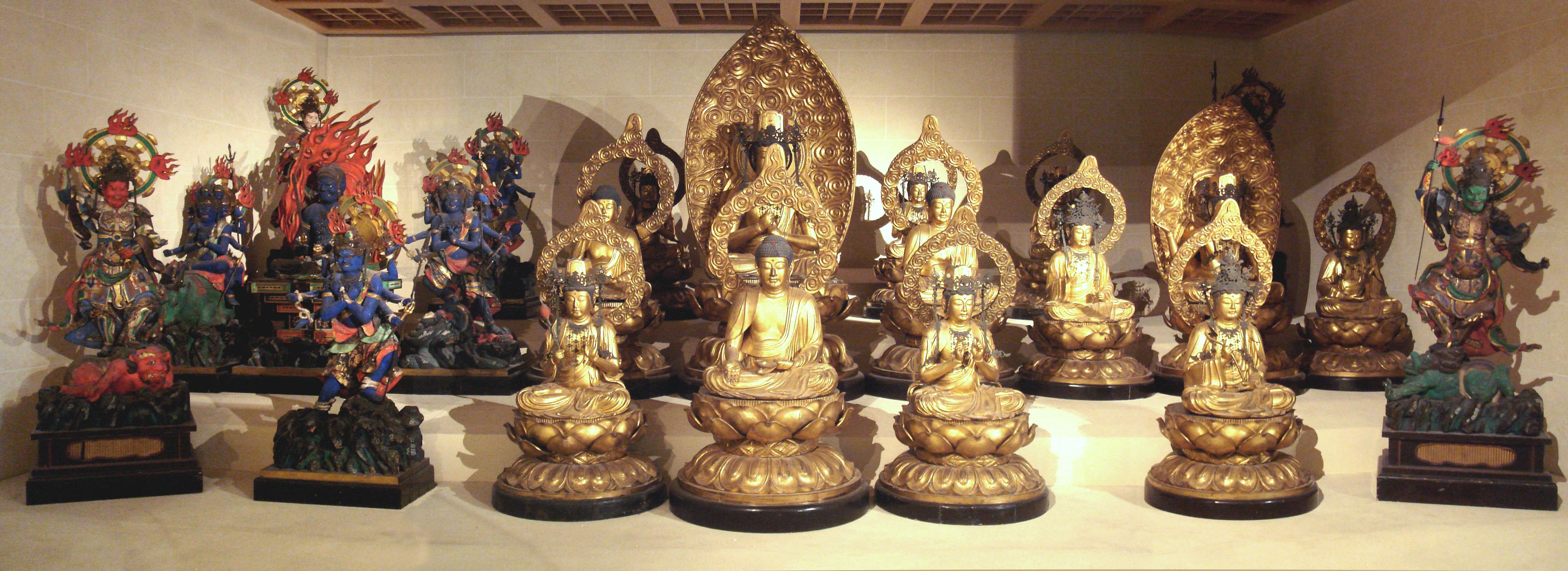
Some of the main representatives of the Japanese Buddhist pantheon, in Musée Guimet, Paris.

The Panthéon Bouddhique, also known as the Galeries du Panthéon Bouddhique or the Galerie du Pantheon Bouddhique du Japon et de la Chine, is a collection of Japanese and Chinese art works. It is a wing of the Guimet Museum, located within the Hôtel Heidelbach at 19, Avenue d'Iéna in the 16th arrondissement of Paris, France.

The museum is located within a former private mansion of banker Alfred Heidelbach (1851–1922), built in 1913 by René Sergent. The building was purchased by the French Ministry of Education in 1955 and renovated in 1991. In 2001, a Japanese-style tea pavilion was built in the garden, in which tea ceremonies are now performed.

Its collection includes some 250 Japanese works of art, plus Chinese artefacts, gathered in 1876 by Émile Étienne Guimet. They are presented as they would appear in Buddhist temples, within a hierarchy of six categories ranging from saints, Shinto and Hindu divinities, kings of science, bodhisattvas, and buddhas.

== See also ==
- List of museums in Paris
- Japanese Buddhist pantheon
