= Alfred Heidelbach =

Alfred S. Heidelbach
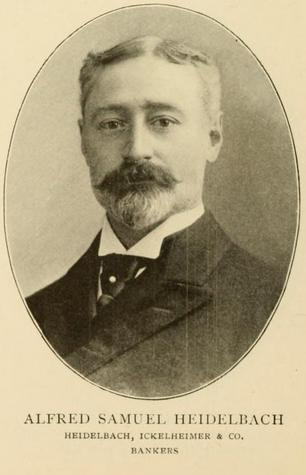
- Born: November 17, 1851; New York City
- Died: February 1, 1922 (aged 70)
- Occupations: Banker, stock broker
- Spouse: Julie Picard (m. 1879)
- Family: Philip Heidelbach (uncle)

Alfred Samuel Heidelbach (November 17, 1851 – February 1, 1922) was an American banker and stock broker.

== Biography ==
He was, until 1867, a New York member of Heidelbach, Seasongood & Co., dry goods merchants of Cincinnati. From Columbia grammar school, Heidelbach went to the University of Zurich in Switzerland, and after finishing his studies, returned to New York. In 1870, he entered the stock brokerage firm of Frank & Garss, known after 1871 as Heidelbach, Frank & Co. In 1873–74, he spent a year in Berlin in the German Empire, and after having looked after the interests of the firm in London during the panic of 1873, returned to New York late in 1874.

His father, Max Heidelbach, died in 1875, and in 1876, Alfred joined his uncle Philip Heidelbach at the firm of Heidelbach, Ickelheimer & Co. which had been established after the marriage of Isaac Ickelheimer to Philip Heidelbach's daughter. This firm made a specialty of foreign exchange and specie and were able to secure valuable connections abroad. He was a director of the United States Life Insurance Company. In 1893, the firm admitted Henry R. Ickelheimer, who represented the interest of his father, Isaac, one of the founders of the concern.

Heidelbach was married, October 1879, in Paris, to Julie Picard. He was a prominent member of the Manhattan, Reform and Lawyers clubs. Heidelbach died on February 1, 1922.

In 1913, he commissioned René Sergent to build a private mansion at 19, avenue d'Iéna in Paris. Purchased by the French state in the 1950s and renovated in 1991, the “Hôtel Heidelbach” has since become an annex of the Musée Guimet, housing the famous “Panthéon bouddhique”, as well as a small garden and a Japanese-style pavilion.

== See also ==
Panthéon Bouddhique
