= Xavier Schoellkopf =

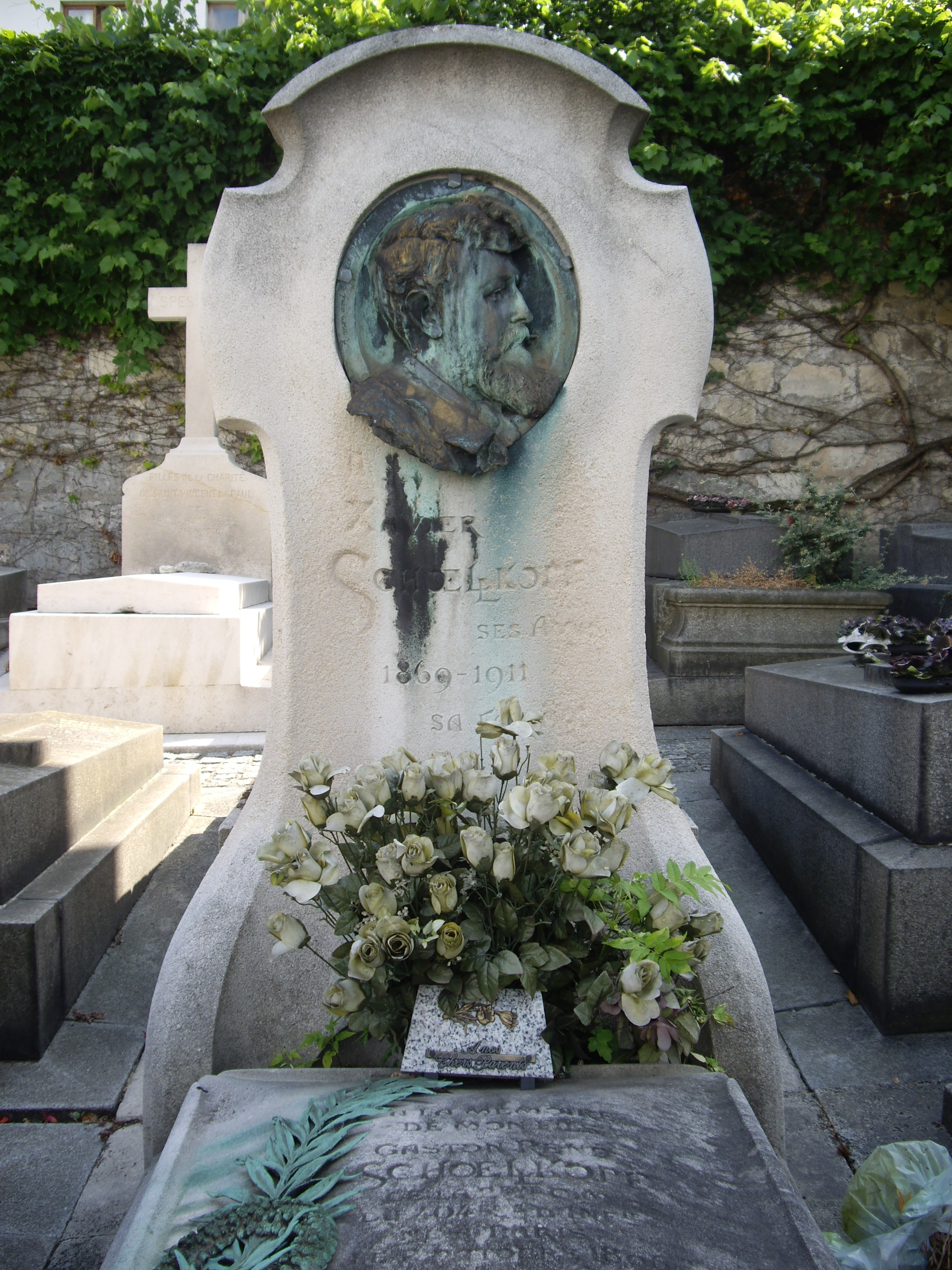
Schoellkopf's tomb in Paris.

Xavier Schoellkopf (1870 Serpukhov, Russian Empire – 1911 Paris, France), was a Russian-born French architect, now recognized as one of the handful of Parisian masters of Art Nouveau at the turn of the twentieth century.

== Education ==
Schoellkopf was born in Serpukhov in 1870 to French parents. He matriculated to the Ecole des Beaux-Arts in Paris, where he trained under the patrons Julien Guadet and then Edmond Paulin when the latter took over Guadet's atelier in 1895. These men were traditional classicists; in 1863–64 Guadet had been one of the students who led a successful revolt against the medievalist Eugène-Emmanuel Viollet-le-duc when the latter had been appointed to head the school. Beginning his studies in 1889 in the entry-level second class, he distinguished himself with four medals there and was promoted to the first class in 1892, receiving medals for his work submitted to the salons of 1895 and 1896. he left the Ecole that year without a degree to begin his own practice.

== Career ==
Although Guadet and Paulin had distinguished themselves as rather conservative designers, Schoellkopf became one of the leading practitioners of the upstart new style that took hold in Paris during the 1890s, Art Nouveau, which was characterized by its asymmetry, emphasis on line, whiplash and irregular curves, movement, and in many cases its frank use of iron, glass, and modern, non-traditional materials. Schoellkopf's career virtually paralleled that of Art Nouveau's existence in Paris, as he launched his practice at almost exactly the same time that the style arrived in the city, and died just as the fad's popularity had expired, just before the outbreak of the First World War.

Schoellkopf's buildings mostly consisted of speculative apartment houses that were populating the fashionable western 16th and 17th arrondissements as well as private town houses. Very little survives of Schoellkopf's own words about architecture. In one, published in the review L'Art décoratif in 1901, he disclosed that he hoped to create a new kind of building adapted to modern needs that might be able to capture the building's "raw character" that he claimed was lost upon its completion. That same year, he completed probably his best-known work, the townhouse on the avenue d'Iéna for the singer and cabaret performer Yvette Guilbert (now demolished), whose façade might be described as a wedding cake of arabesques and contours translated into stone.

Schoellkopf's opportunity for creativity seems to have declined as the popularity of Art Nouveau quickly vanished for a variety of reasons, chiefly political, over the first decade of the twentieth century. He only produced a handful of works, and only a portion of those actually survive to the present day. The Hôtel Sanchez de Larragoiti, a private townhouse in the 16th arrondissement of Paris, now serves as the Iranian embassy to France.

Schoellkopf died in Paris in 1911. He is interred at the cemetery of St-Vincent de Montmartre in northern Paris, where his small tomb is ornamented with a copper medallion by the sculptor of many of his façades, Marcel Rouillère.

== Works ==
- 1897–1898: apartment building at 4 avenue d'Iéna, Paris (now the embassy of Iran)
- 1898: apartment building at 92–94 avenue de la République et 60 rue Servan, Paris
- 1900–1901: townhouse for Yvette Guilbert, 28bis boulevard Berthier, Paris
- 1901: apartment building at 29 boulevard de Courcelles, Paris
- 1908: apartment building at 90 avenue Parmentier, Paris
