= Murray Seasongood =

American politician (1878–1983)

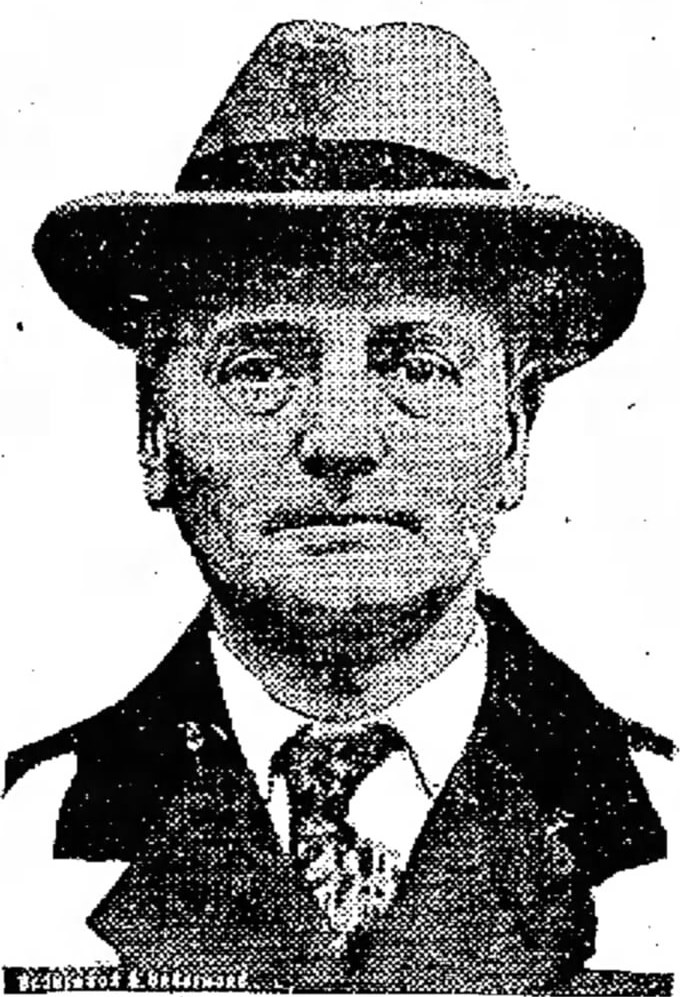
- Seasongood circa 1925

36th Mayor of Cincinnati
- In office January 1, 1926 – January 2, 1930
- Preceded by: George Carrell
- Succeeded by: Russell Wilson

Personal details
- Born: October 27, 1878 Cincinnati, Ohio
- Died: February 21, 1983 (aged 104) Cincinnati, Ohio
- Party: Charter Party
- Education: Harvard University; Harvard Law School
- Profession: Lawyer, Politician

Murray Seasongood (October 27, 1878 – February 21, 1983) was an American lawyer and politician. He led a government reform movement in Cincinnati, founding the Charter Party and served as the Mayor of Cincinnati, Ohio from 1926 to 1930. He was the first mayor under the city's 1925 charter. He remains the longest lived mayors of Cincinnati as well as one of the longest lived mayors in the United States.

== Early life and career ==
He was born in Cincinnati on October 27, 1878, the son of Emily (née Fechheimer) and Alfred Seasongood. He had three siblings, Martha, Rose, and Edwin. His father was a wealthy clothing merchant who worked for Heidelbach, Seasongood & Co., co-founded by his great-uncle Jacob Seasongood and Philip Heidelbach (later J. & L. Seasongood after the departure of Heidelbach and then Seasongood, Menderson & Co after the retirement of Jacob). He graduated from Harvard University and Harvard Law School and began a career in the law with Warrington & Paxton.

== Mayor of Cincinnati ==
Cincinnati had a notoriously corrupt government under George B. Cox, also known as “Boss” Cox. Lincoln Steffens called Cincinnati of the two worst governed cities in the United States. In 1905, then-Secretary of War William Howard Taft delivered a speech in Akron that attacked the corruption under Cox.

Although Cox's candidate was defeated in that election, his political machine continued to dominate the city. In 1921, Republicans controlled 31 out of 32 seats on the city council. Seasongood, himself a Republican, founded the City Charter Committee and placed a reform agenda to break the bosses' control of city politics.

The new Charter passed in 1924 and reorganized the city council from 32 members to nine with non-partisan elections. It created a civil service system to eliminate political patronage and made Cincinnati the first large city with a council-manager administration. With the new charter in place, Seasongood was elected to the Cincinnati City Council. His colleagues on the council elected him as the first mayor under the new system.

As Mayor, Seasongood was instrumental in the establishment of a county park board, after visiting and admiring the Emerald Necklace that is Cleveland Metroparks. He is the namesake of the Murray Seasongood Pavilion in Eden Park, Cincinnati.

== Later life ==
After leaving the mayor's office, he continued his legal practice and was appointed as a law professor at Harvard Law School. In the 1930s he founded a committee to end Republican control of Hamilton County. He fought against attempts to reverse his reforms and wrote articles on municipal governance. When once asked what his hobby was, he responded by saying, "Good government."

He maintain his legal practice at Paxton & Seasongood even at the age of 100. Seasongood died February 21, 1983, at the age of 104. He was survived by his wife, Agnes Senior, whom he married in 1912, and their daughter, Janet Seasongood Hoffheimer.

Political offices
Preceded by George Carrel	Mayor of Cincinnati, Ohio; 1926 - 1929	Succeeded by Russell Wilson
Non-profit organization positions
Preceded by Richard S. Childs	President of the National Municipal League; 1931–1934	Succeeded by Harold W. Dodds
