= Philip Heidelbach =

American businessman (1814–1885)

- Born: 1814; Bavaria
- Died: November 29, 1886 (aged 71–72); Manhattan
- Spouse: Hannah Heidelbach
- Family: Alfred Heidelbach (nephew)

Philip Heidelbach (1814 – November 29, 1885) was an American businessman who co-founded dry goods merchant Heidelbach, Seasongood & Co. in Cincinnati and the private bank Heidelbach, Ickelheimer & Co. In New York City.

== Biography ==
Heidelbach was born on 20 June 1814 in the village of Pfarrweisach in Bavaria, where he was learning the butcher trade. In 1837, he immigrated to the United States first settling briefly in New York City where he invested all his money in $8 of merchandise which he converted into $150 after three months. In the same year, he moved to Cincinnati where he continued to peddle, increasing his capital to $2,000 after a year. In the early 1840s, he went into business with another Jewish peddler, Jacob Seasongood, founding dry good store Heidelbach, Seasongood & Co. By 1860, they had a large clothing factory which prospered making clothing and blankets for the Union Army with $1.2 million in sales by 1864 becoming the largest clothing manufacturer in the Mississippi Valley. In 1861, he co-founded the bank Espy, Heidelbach & Co with a gentile partner. In 1865, he moved to New York City and set up his own private bank. In 1876, his firm was renamed Heidelbach, Ickelheimer & Co. after his son-in-law, Isaac Ickelheimer (married to Jennie Heidelbach Ickelheimer), became a partner.

Heidelbach was one of the first trustees of the Cincinnati Southern Railroad. He served as president of the School Board of B'nai Israel and was active in the Hebrew Benevolent Society. He was married to Hannah Heidelbach née Leeser. The couple had six children together.
