= Jacob Seasongood =

American businessman

- Born: c. 1812; Burgkunstadt, Bavaria
- Died: February 5, 1884
- Spouse: Lena Keiffer/Kiefer
- Children: 5
- Family: Murray Seasongood (great-nephew)

Jacob Seasongood (born c. 1812 – February 5, 1884) was an American businessman who co-founded dry goods merchants Heidelbach, Seasongood & Co. and J. & L. Seasongood & Co.; and banking firms Seasongood, Netter, & Co and Seasongood Sons & Co. in Cincinnati.

== Biography ==
Seasongood was born to a Jewish family in Burgkunstadt, Bavaria where he studied to be a weaver's apprentice. In 1837, he immigrated to the United States arriving in New York City with a sum of $75. He used his money to peddle goods and after two months, moved to Cincinnati. While en route in Chillicothe, Ohio, he met Philip Heidelbach, a fellow Jew from Bavaria with a similar immigrant story. In 1837, they partnered and pooled their resources and in 1840, founded a dry goods store, Heidelbach, Seasongood & Co. In 1850, his nephew, Lewis Seasongood, joined the firm; and in 1860, his nephew, Alfred Seasongood (father of Murray Seasongood), joined the firm. By 1860, they had a large clothing factory which prospered making clothing and blankets for the Union Army with $1.2 million in sales by 1864 becoming the largest clothing manufacturer in the Mississippi Valley. In the 1860s, the partnership was dissolved; and in 1865, Heidelbach moved to New York City. In 1969, Jacob and his nephews Lewis and Alfred partnered with Elias Moch to form the dry goods retailer J. & L. Seasongood & Co. In 1870, Jacob and Lewis partnered with Jacob Netter and formed a bank, Seasongood, Netter, & Co.; the firm was dissolved in 1875 after the death of Netter and Jacob formed a new bank, Seasongood Sons & Co. with his son, Adolph J. Seasongood; his nephews, Lewis Seasongood and Alfred Seasongood; and another investor, Charles Mayer. In 1877, Jacob Seasongood retired and J. & L. Seasongood & Co. was dissolved.

== Personal life ==
Seasongood served as an officer of B'nai Israel, as a director of the Jewish Hospital, and as director of the Hebrew Benevolent Association. He died on February 5, 1884. He had five children: Emma Seasongood (married to his nephew Lewis Seasongood); Jennie Seasongood Bohm (married to Joseph Bohm); Julia Seasongood Reis (married to Julius Reis); Adolph J. Seasongood; and Charles Seasongood.
