= Guimet Museum =

National museum of Asian arts in Paris, France

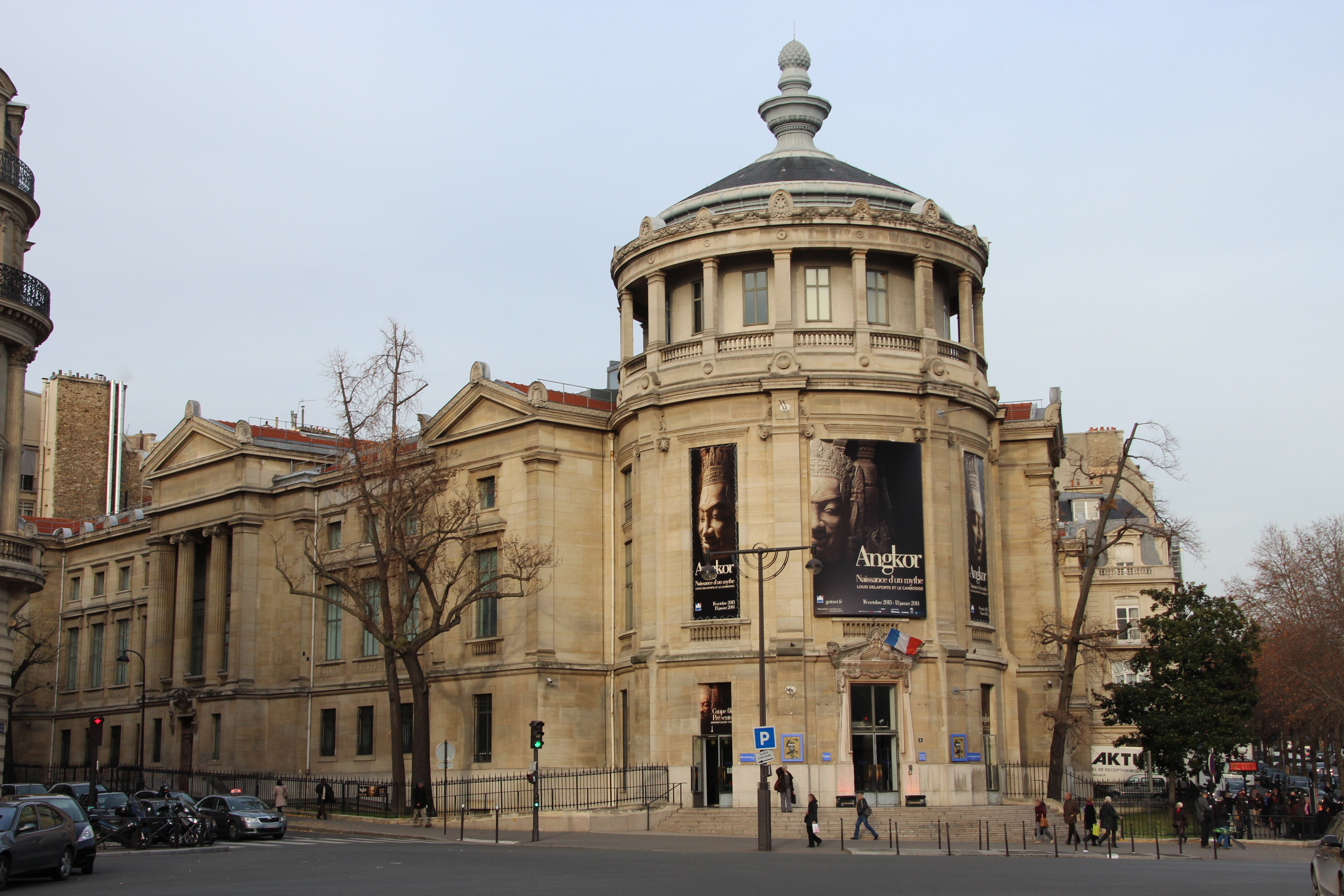
- The museum in December 2013

- Location within Paris
- Established: 1879; 147 years ago
- Location: 6, Place d'Iéna, 16th arrondissement of Paris
- Coordinates: 48°51′55″N 2°17′38″E
- Type: Asian art
- Website: www.guimet.fr/en

The Guimet Museum (full name in French: Musée national des arts asiatiques-Guimet, MNAAG; abbr. Musée Guimet, [myze ɡimɛ]) is a Parisian art museum with one of the largest and most comprehensive collections of Asian art outside of Asia which includes items from Cambodia, Thailand, Vietnam, Tibet, India, and Nepal, among other countries.

Founded in the late 19th century, it is located in the 16th arrondissement of Paris, at 6, Place d'Iéna. Its name literally translated into English is the National Museum of Asian Arts-Guimet, or Guimet National Museum of Asian Arts.

== History ==
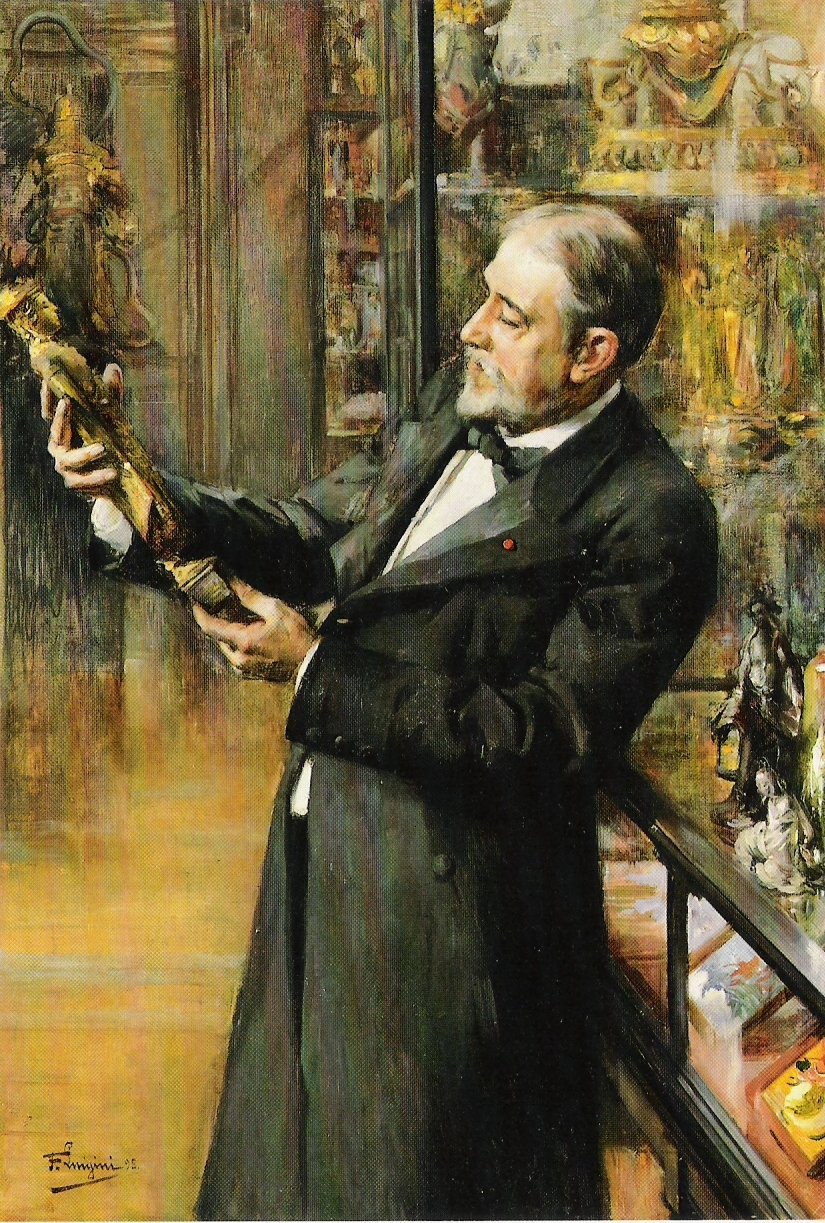
Émile Guimet in his Museum, by Ferdinand Jean Luigini, 1898

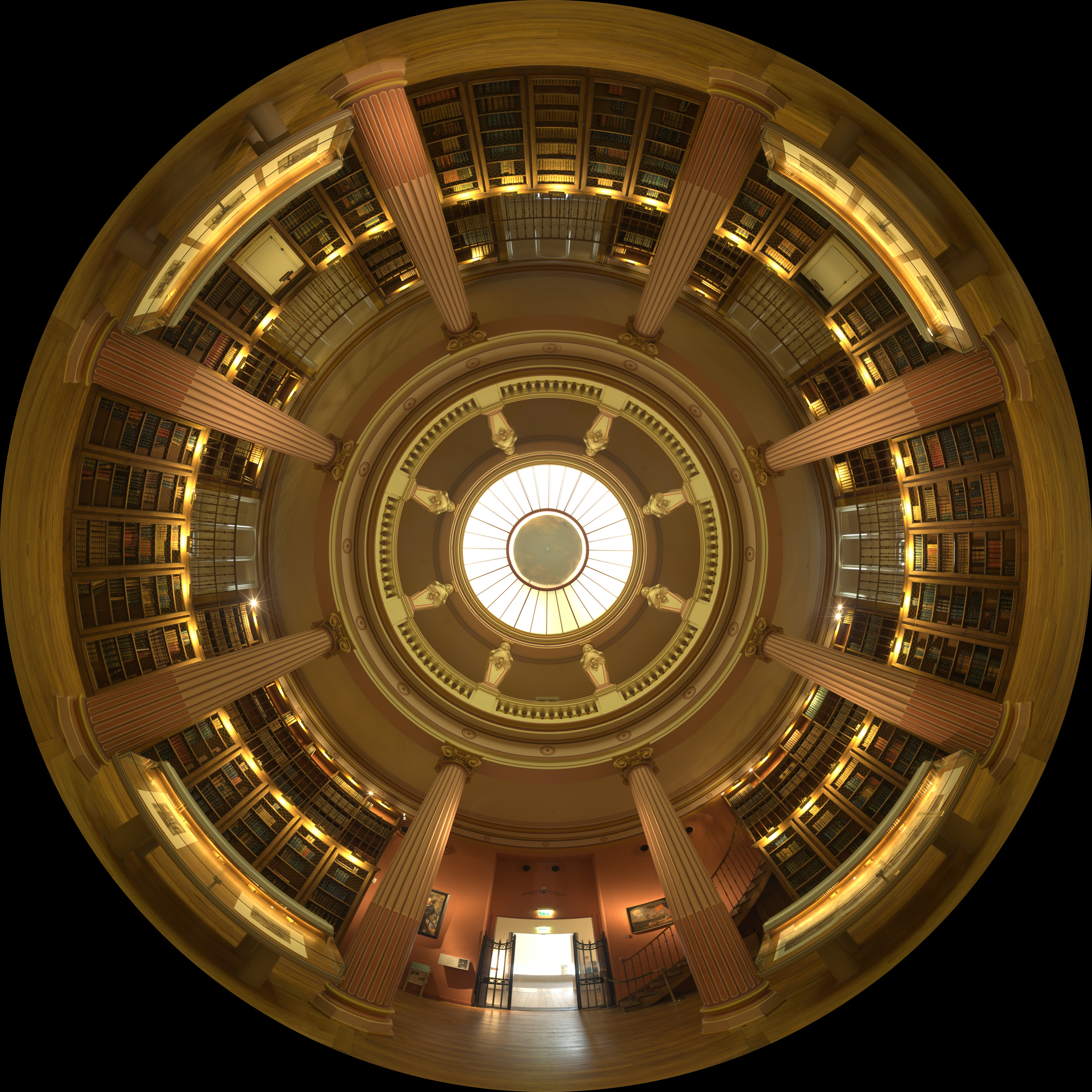
Panoramic view of the library in the Guimet Museum

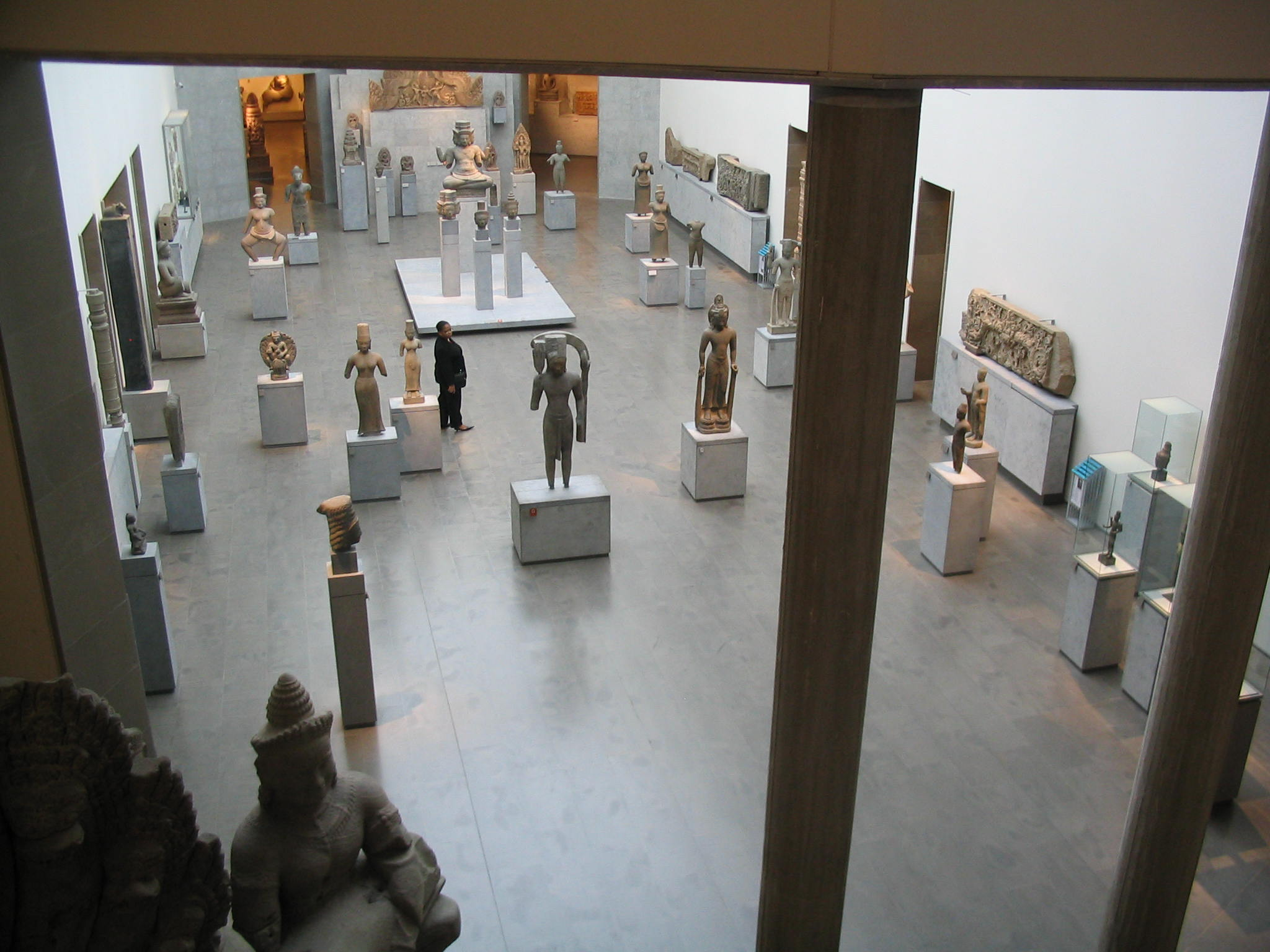
Ground floor of the museum in September 2006

Founded by Émile Étienne Guimet, a French industrialist and traveler, the museum first opened in Lyon in 1879 but was later transferred to Paris, opening on the Place d'Iéna in 1889. Devoted to travel, Guimet was in 1876 commissioned by the minister of public instruction to study the religions of the Far East, and the museum contains many of the fruits of this expedition, including a fine collection of Chinese and Japanese porcelain and objects relating not merely to the religions of the East, but also to those of ancient Egypt, Greece and Rome. One of its wings, the Panthéon Bouddhique, displays Buddhist artworks.

Some of the museum's artifacts, originating from Cambodia, are connected with the studies conducted by the first scholars to be interested in Khmer sculpture, Louis Delaporte and Etienne Aymonier. They sent examples of Khmer art to France at a time when museums were not existing in Southeast Asia, with the agreement of the King of Cambodia, to show to Europe the high level of the ancient Khmer culture.

From December 2006 to April 2007, the museum harboured collections of the Kabul Museum, with archaeological pieces from the Greco-Bactrian city of Ai-Khanoum, and the Indo-Scythian treasure of Tillia Tepe.

== Works of art of the museum ==
=== Greco-Buddhist art ===
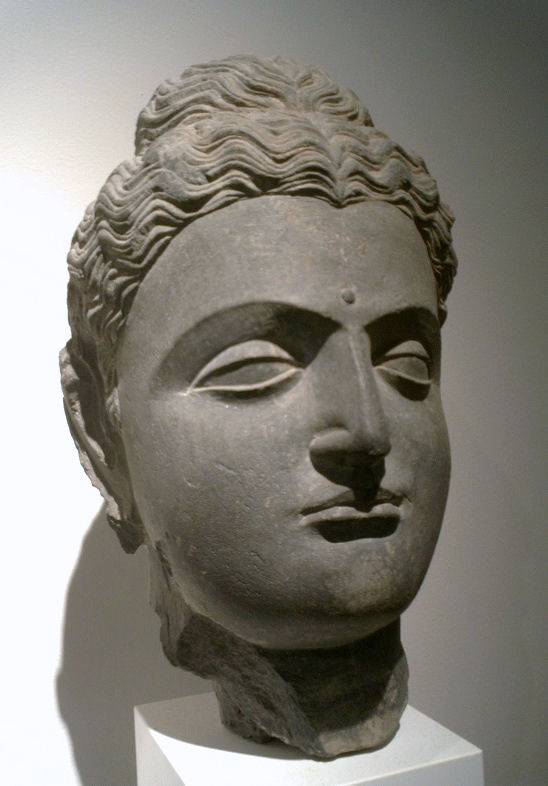
Gandhara Buddha, 1st–2nd century CE

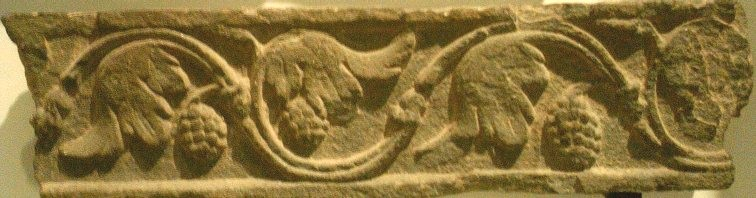
Hellenistic decorative scrolls from Hadda, northern Afghanistan

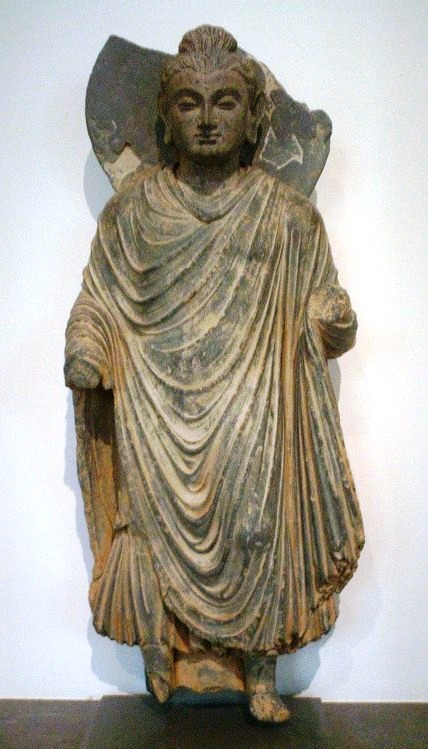
Standing Buddha, ancient region of Gandhara, northern Afghanistan, 1st century

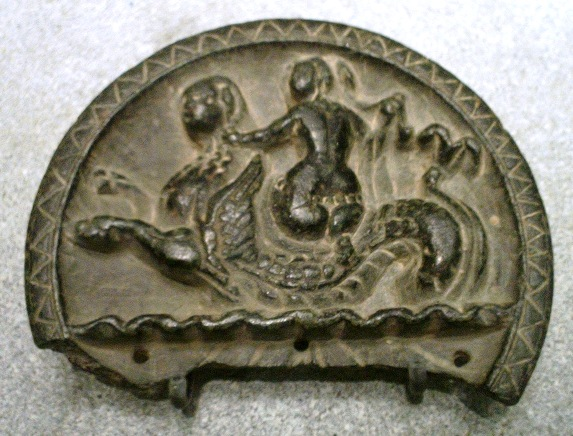
Stone palette of a Nereid sea-goddess riding a Ketos sea-monster, Sirkap, 2nd century BCE

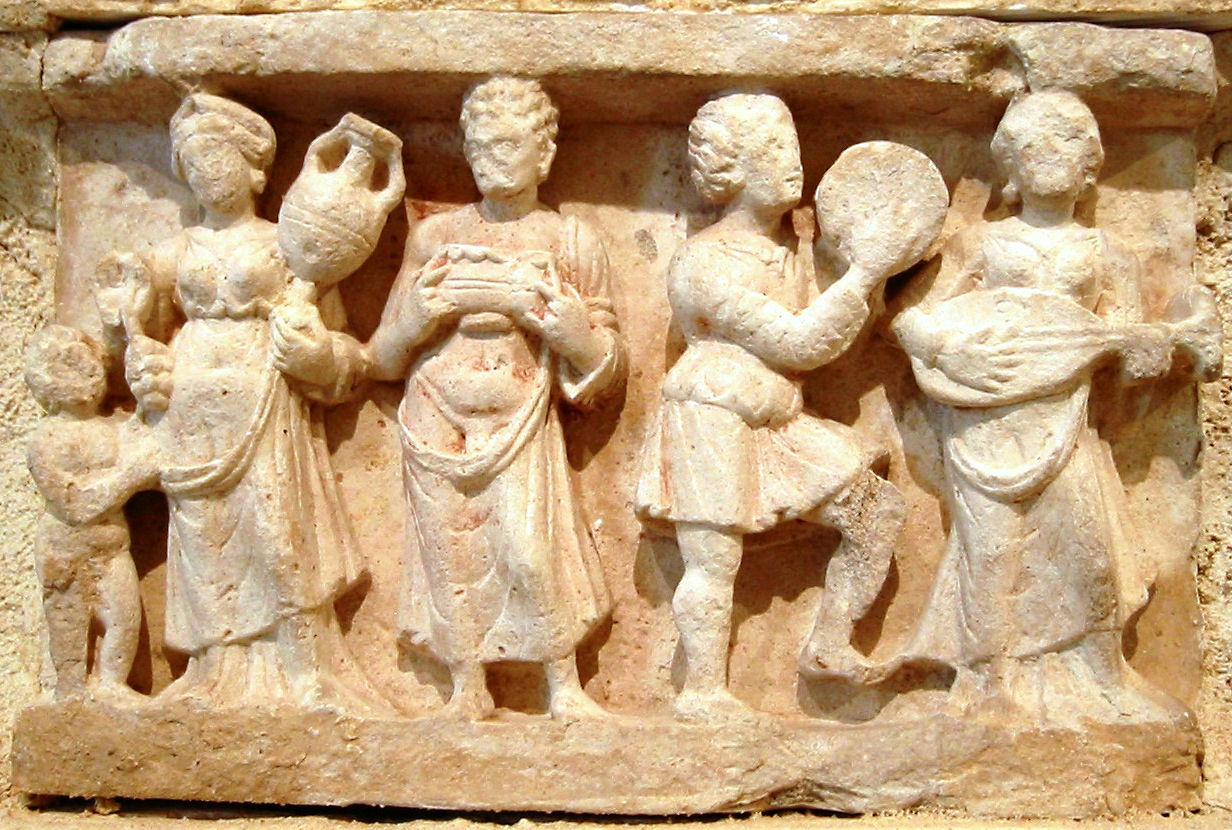
Wine-drinking and music, Hadda, 1st–2nd century CE

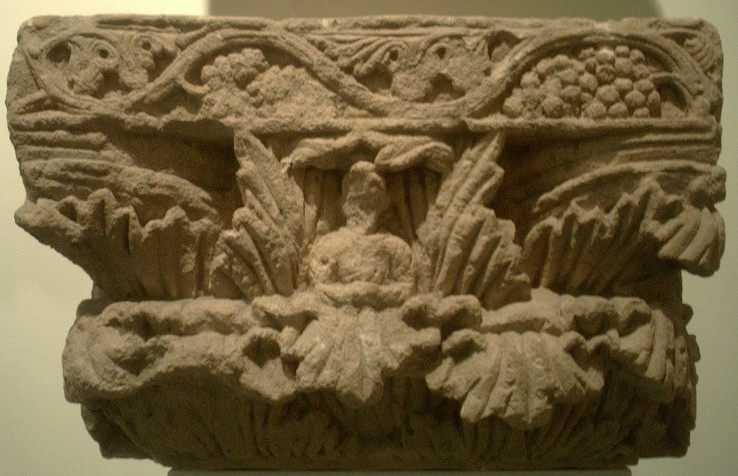
A Corinthian capitol with a Buddha at its center, 2nd century, Surk Kotal, Afghanistan

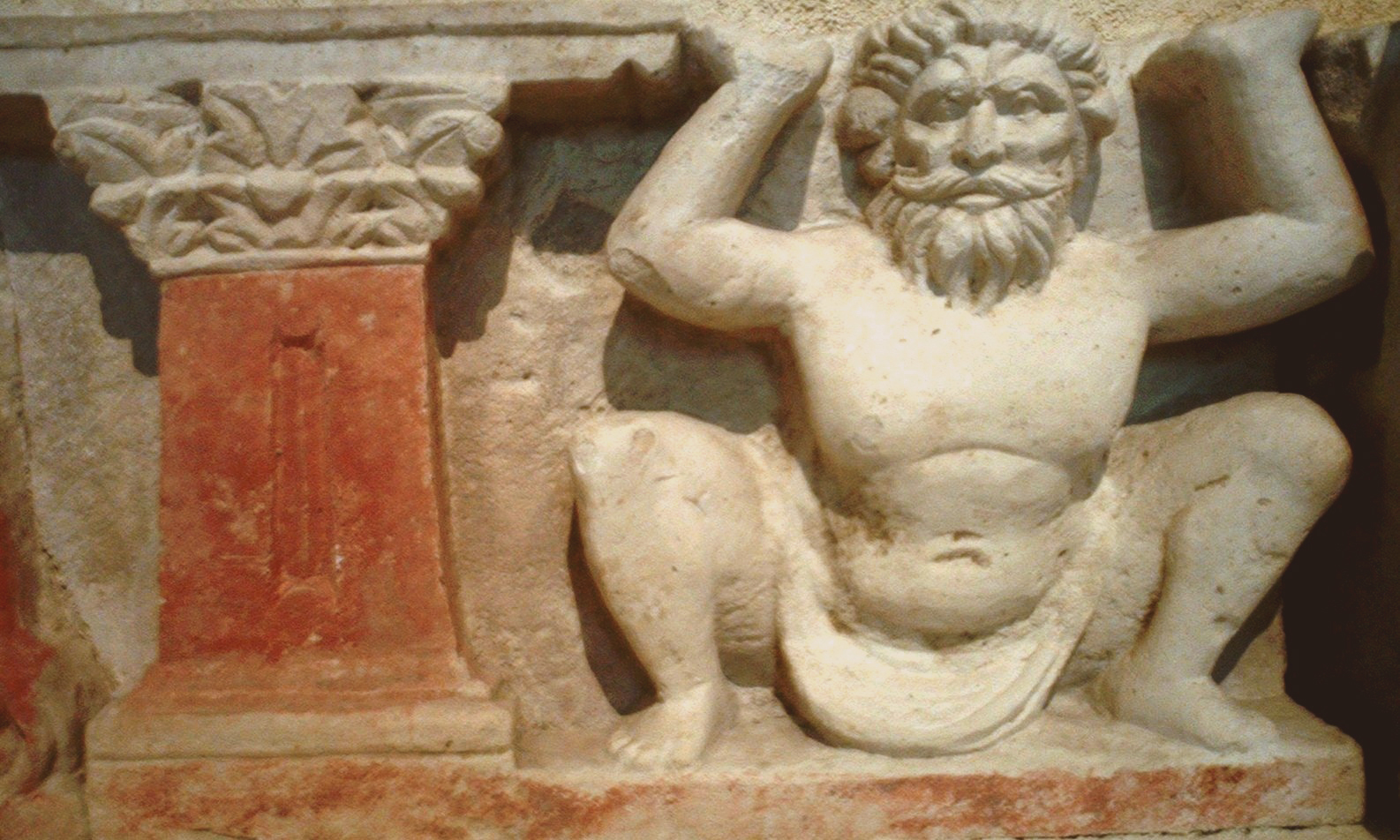
The Greek god Atlas, supporting a Buddhist monument, Hadda

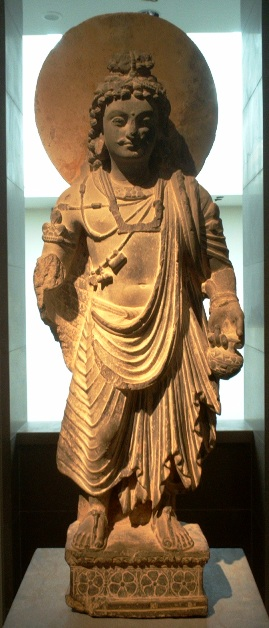
The Bodhisattva Maitreya, 2nd century, Gandhara

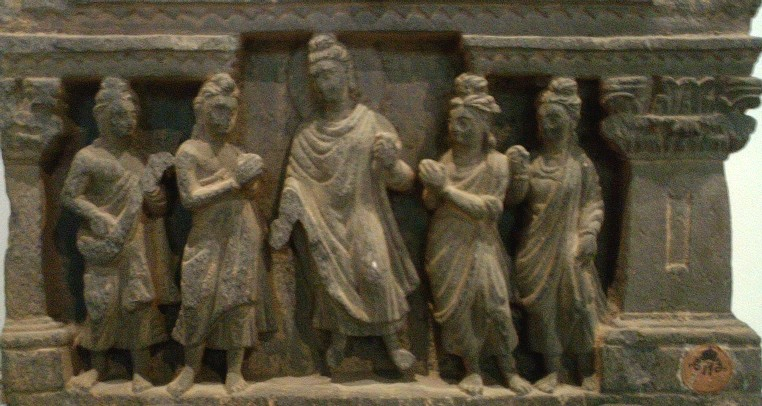
Scene of the life of the Buddha. 2nd–3rd century. Gandhara

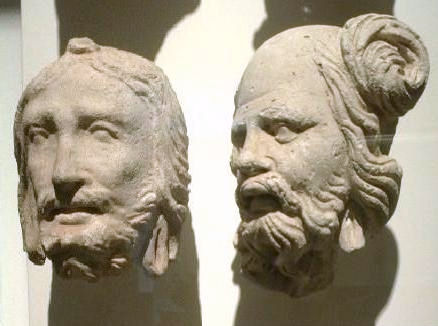
Portraits from the site of Hadda, 3rd century

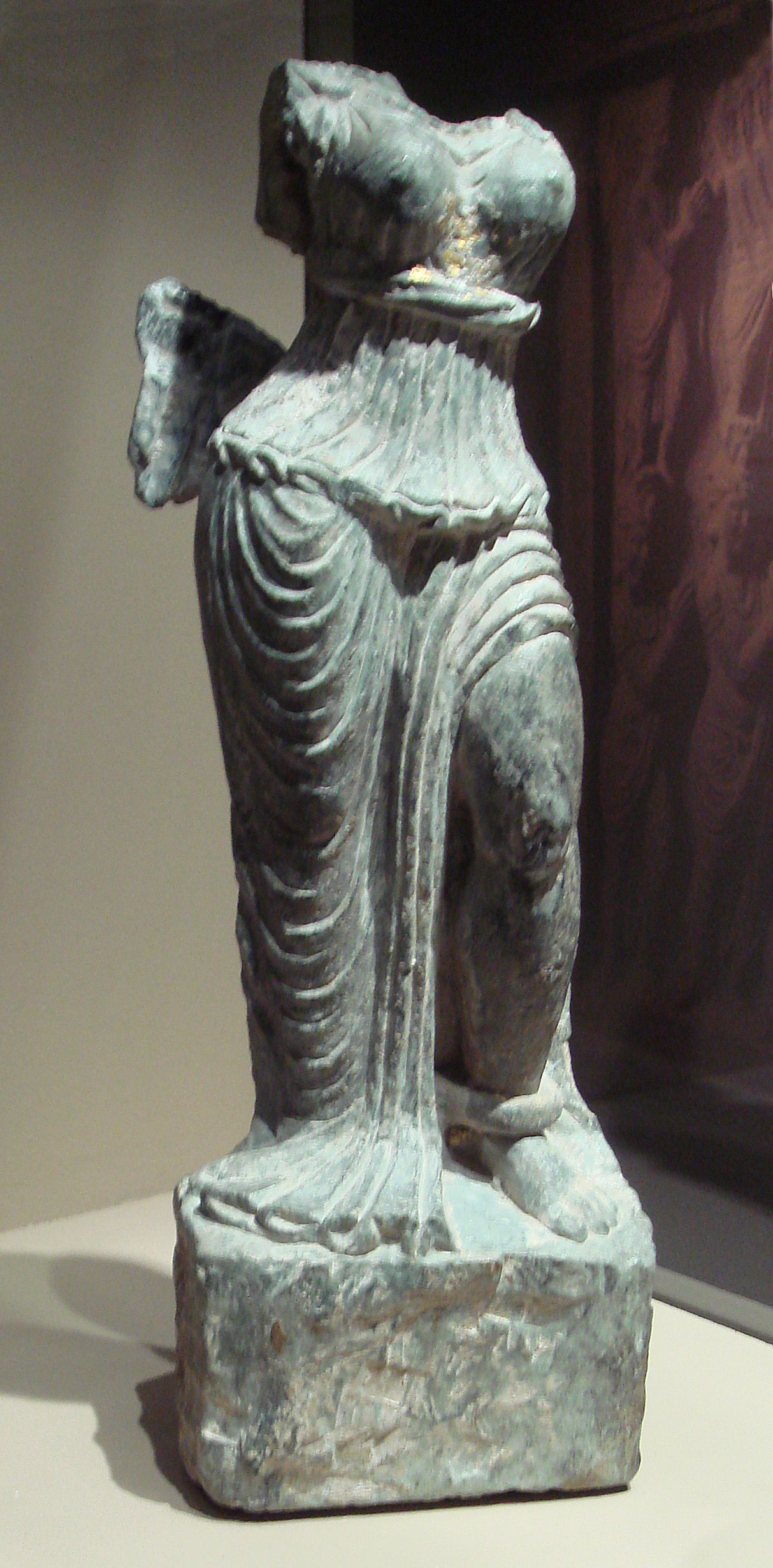
Statuette excavated from the Dharmarajika Stupa site at Sirkap, Pakistan

=== Serindian art ===
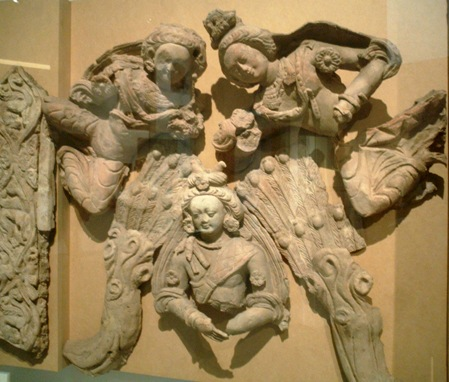
"Heroic gesture of the Bodhisattva", 6th–7th century terracotta, Tumshuq (Xinjiang)

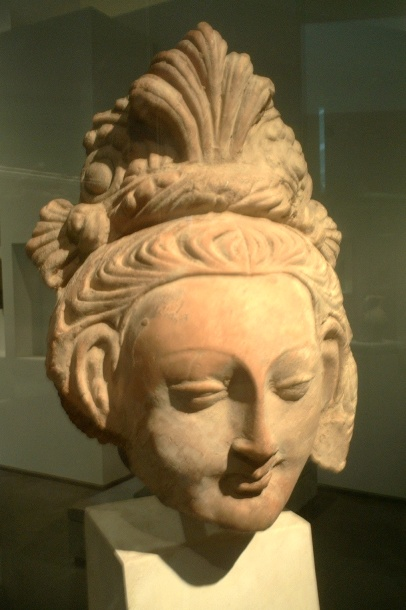
Head of a Bodhisattva, 6th–7th century terracotta, Tumshuq (Xinjiang)

=== Chinese art ===
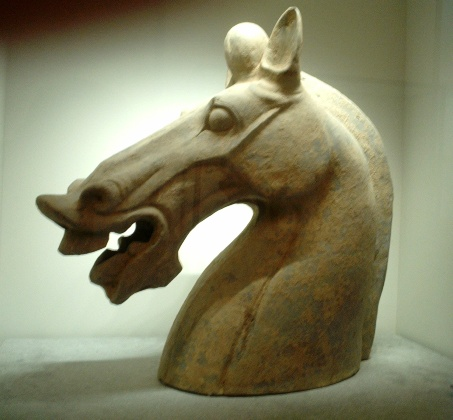
Han dynasty Horse (1st–2nd century)

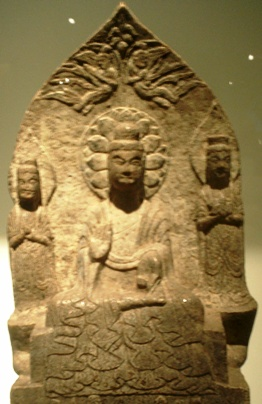
Buddha triad, Eastern Wei (534–550), China

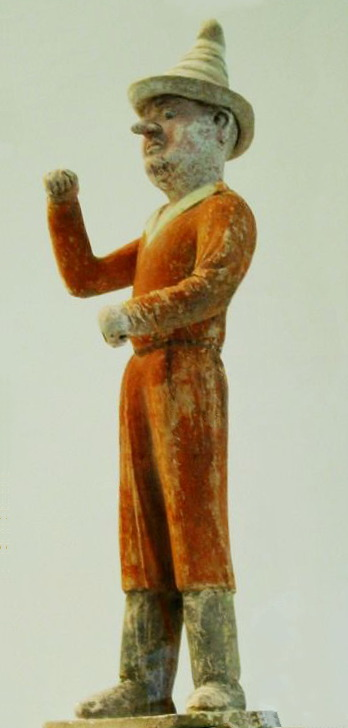
Tang dynasty Foreign Merchant

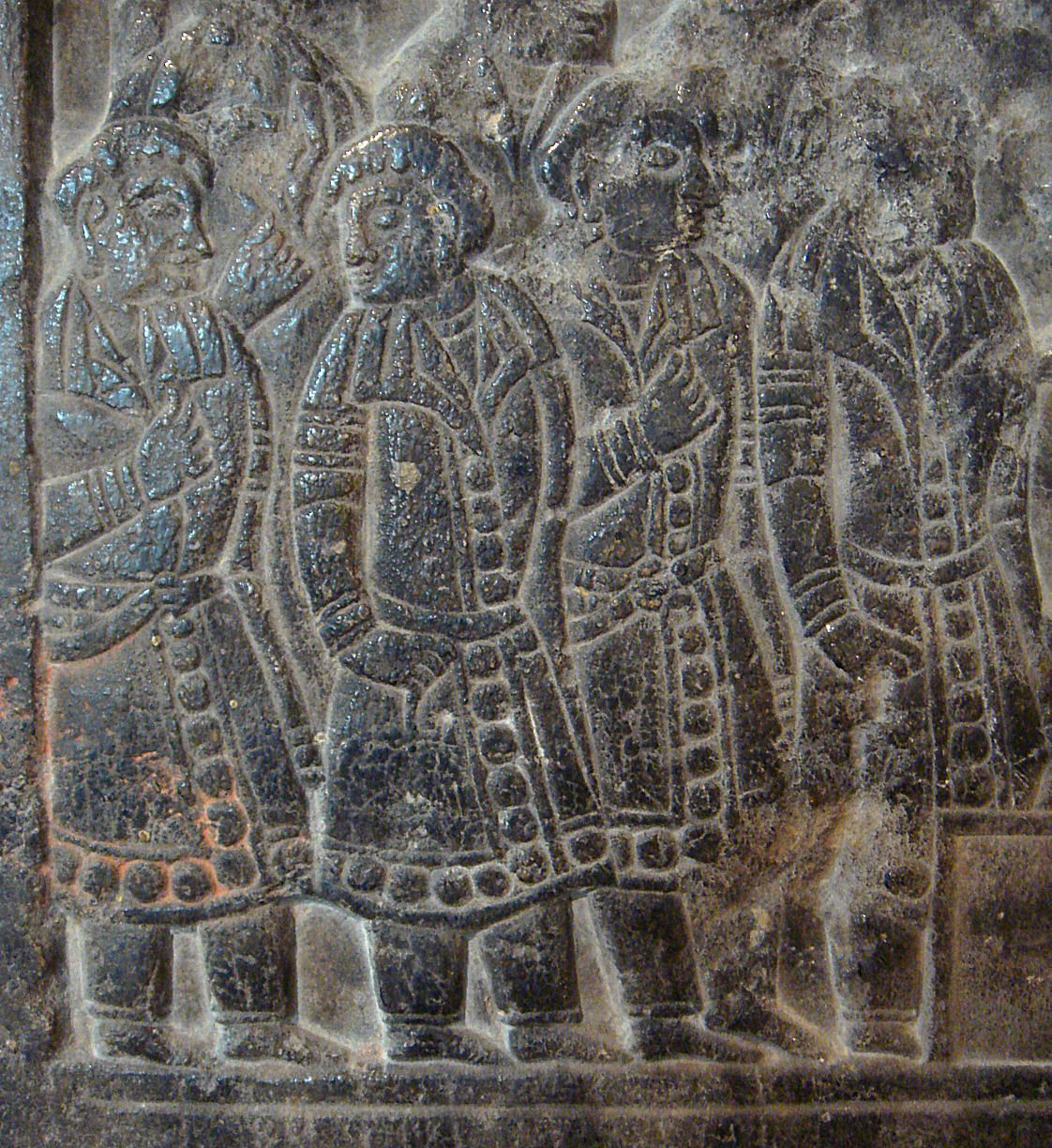
Northern Qi depiction of Sogdians

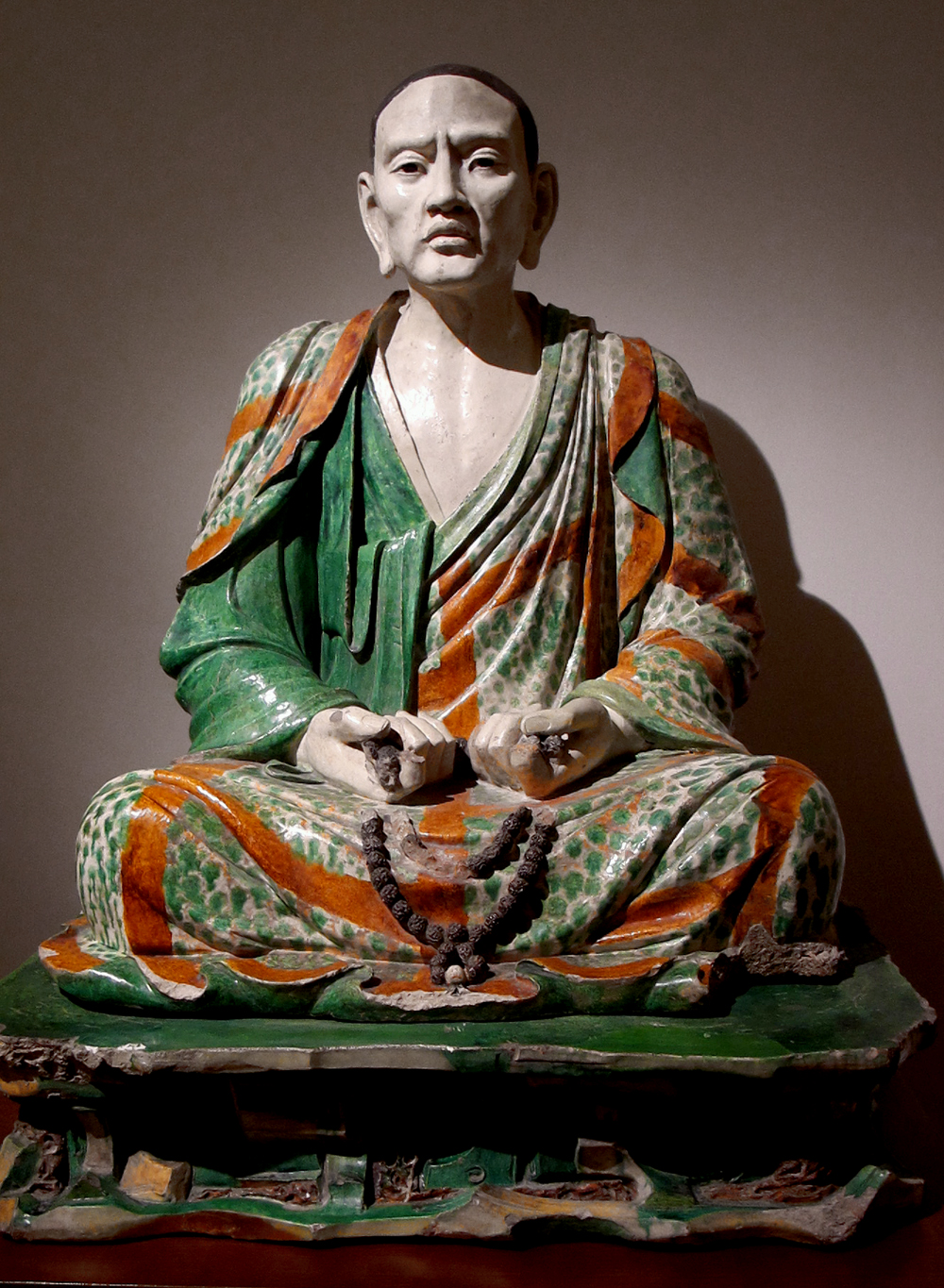
One of the Group of glazed pottery luohans from Yixian, c. 1000

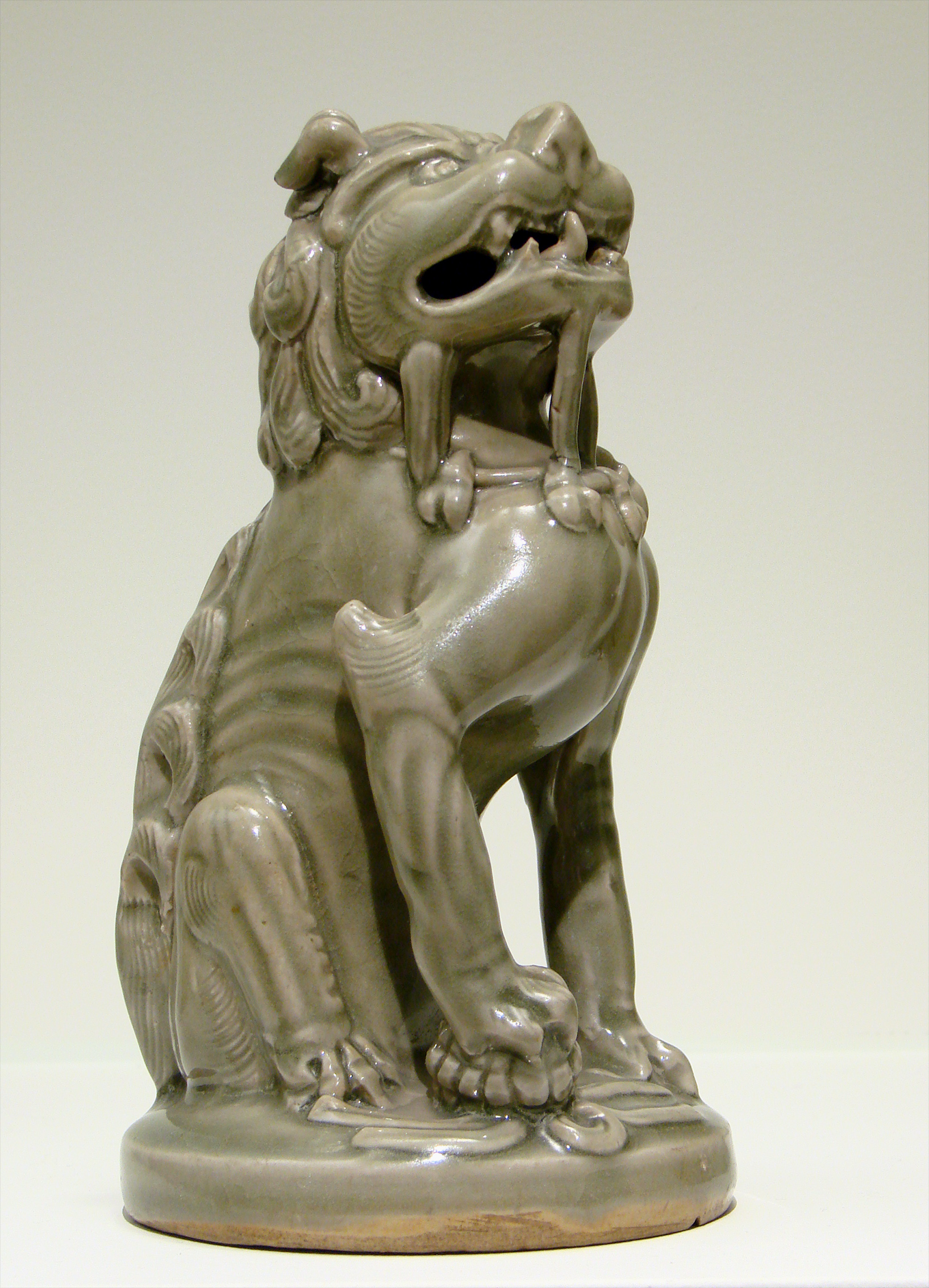
A sitting celadon lion, dated 11th to 12th century, Song dynasty

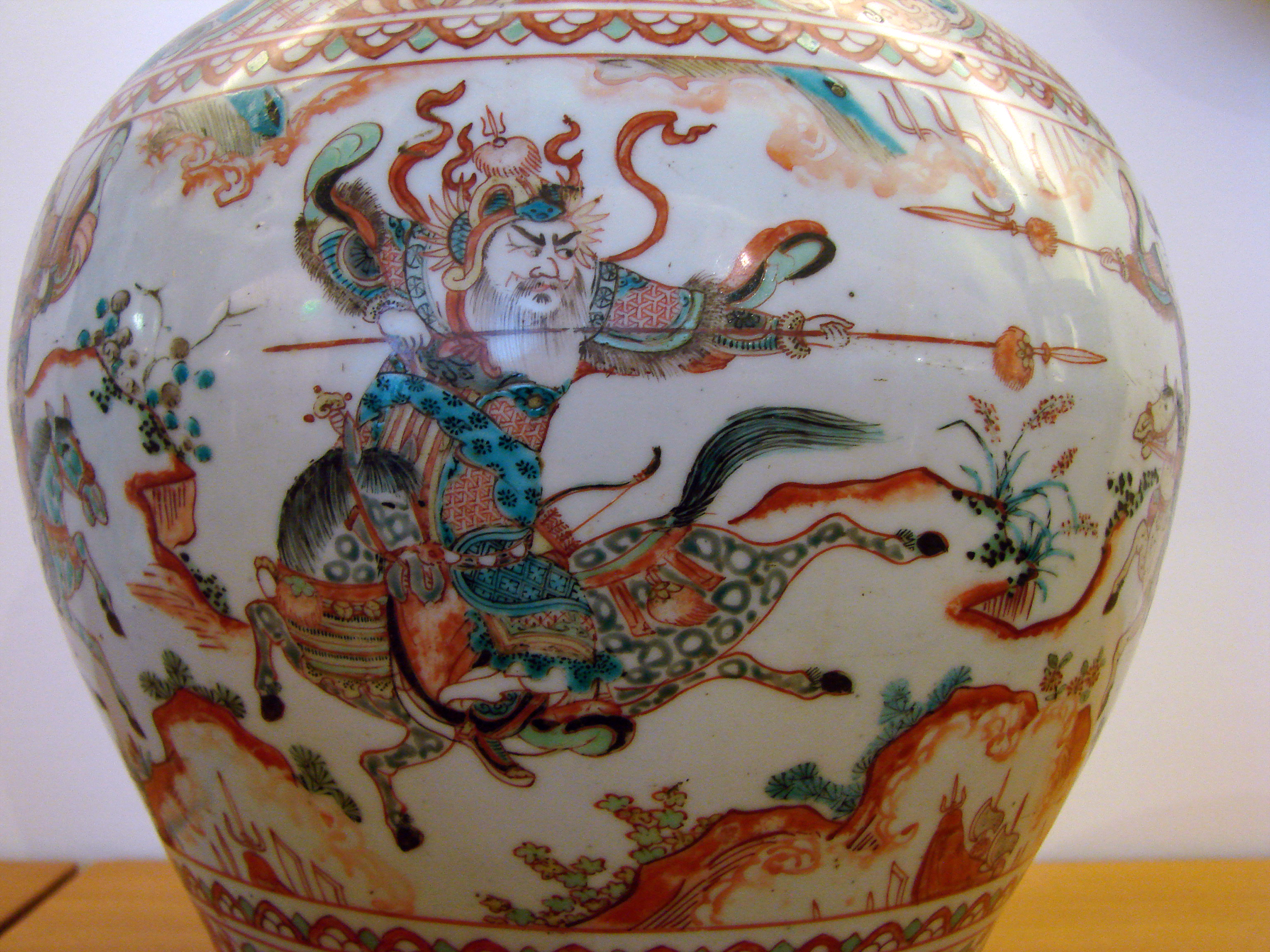
A porcelain vase with design of men fighting on horseback, from the Jiajing reign period (1521–1567), Ming dynasty

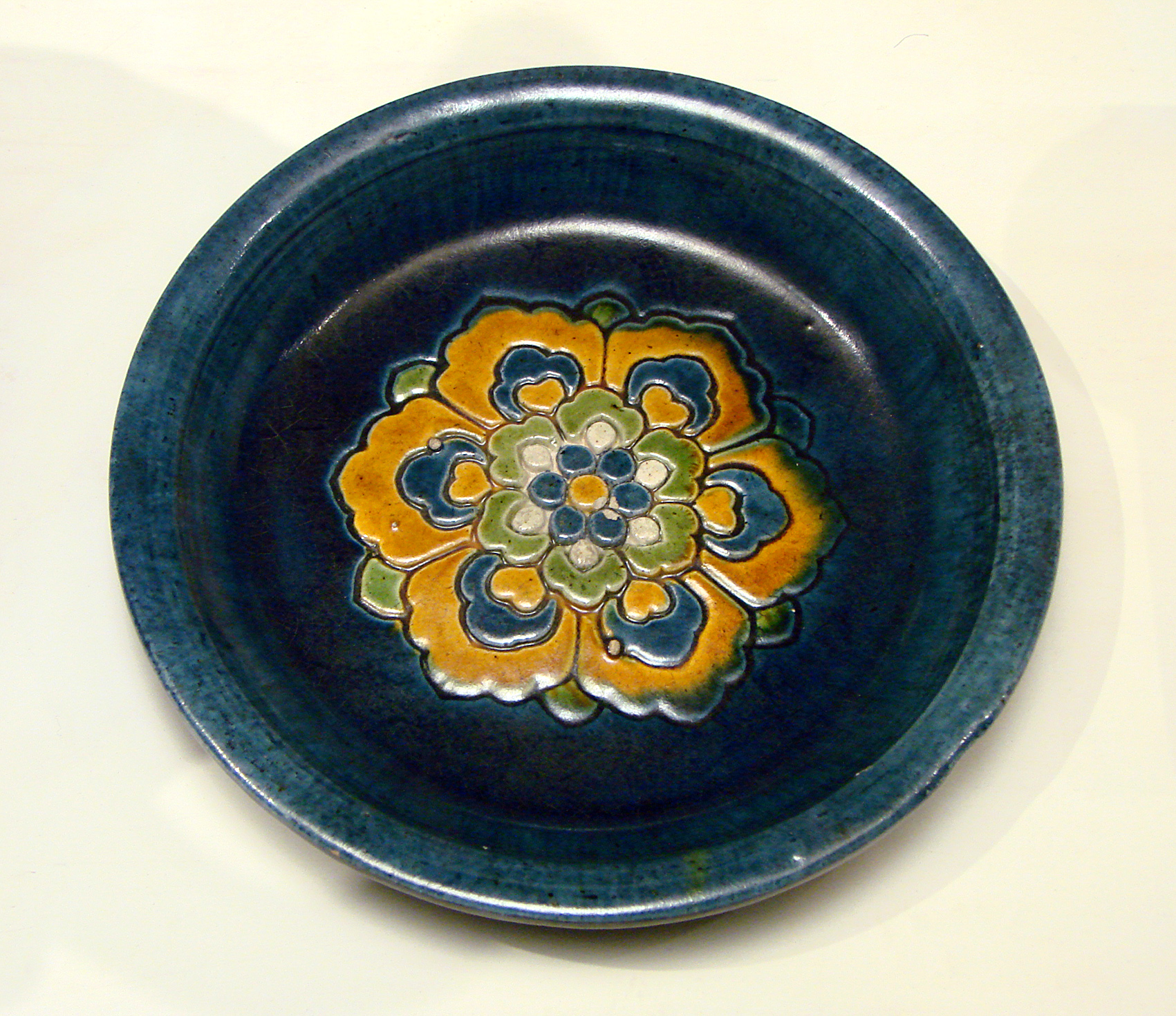
A round sancai dish from the Tang dynasty, 8th to 9th century

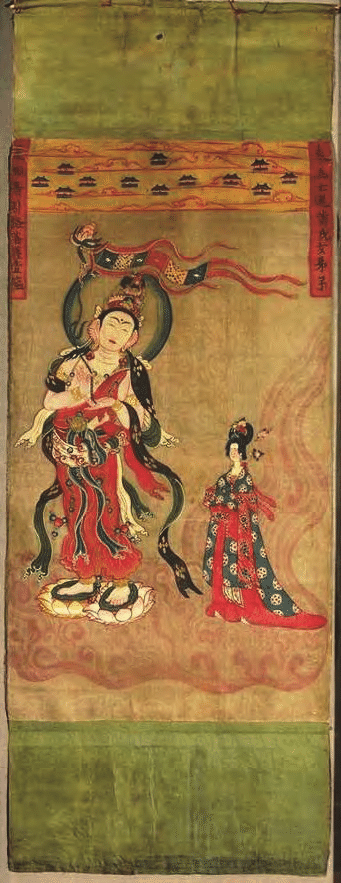
Painting Bodhisattva Who Leads the Way from Mo-kao caves, 900–950 A.D.

=== Indian art ===
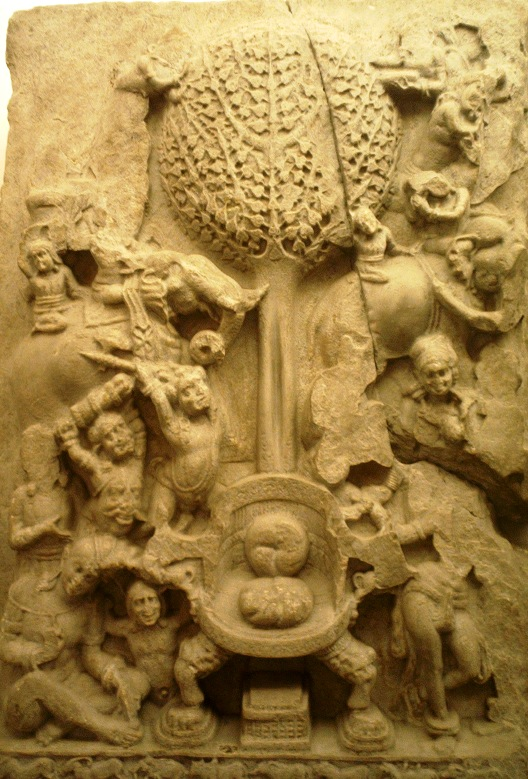
An aniconic representation of Mara's assault on the Buddha, 2nd century, Amaravati style, eastern India

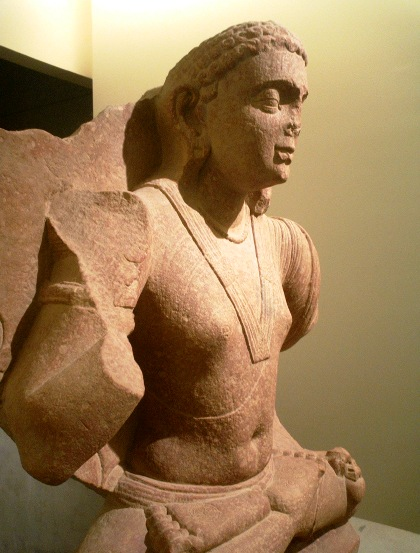
The Bodhisattva Maitreya, 2nd century, Mathura

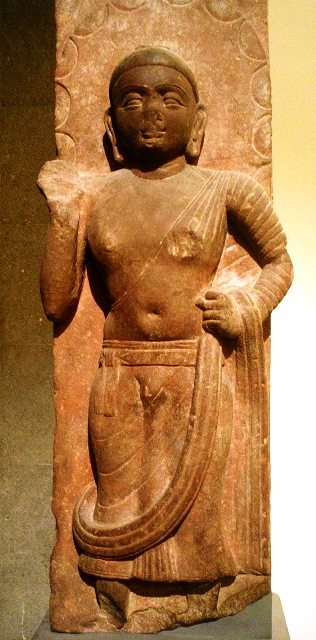
A Buddha, 2nd century, Mathura

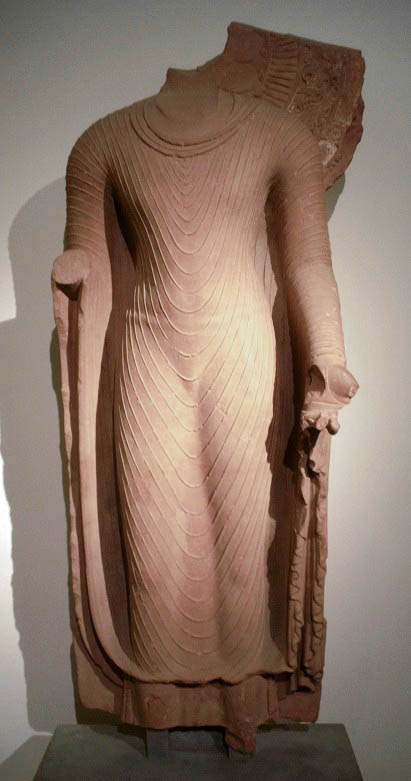
Buddha of the Gupta period, 5th century, Mathura

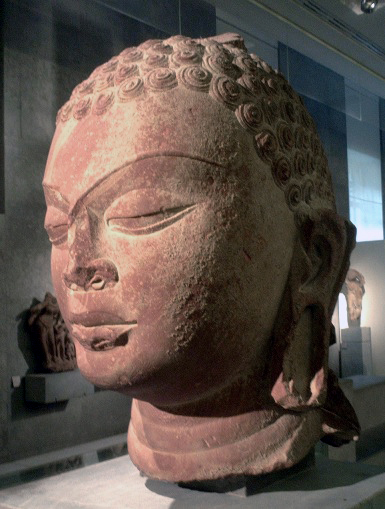
Head of a Buddha, Gupta period, 6th century

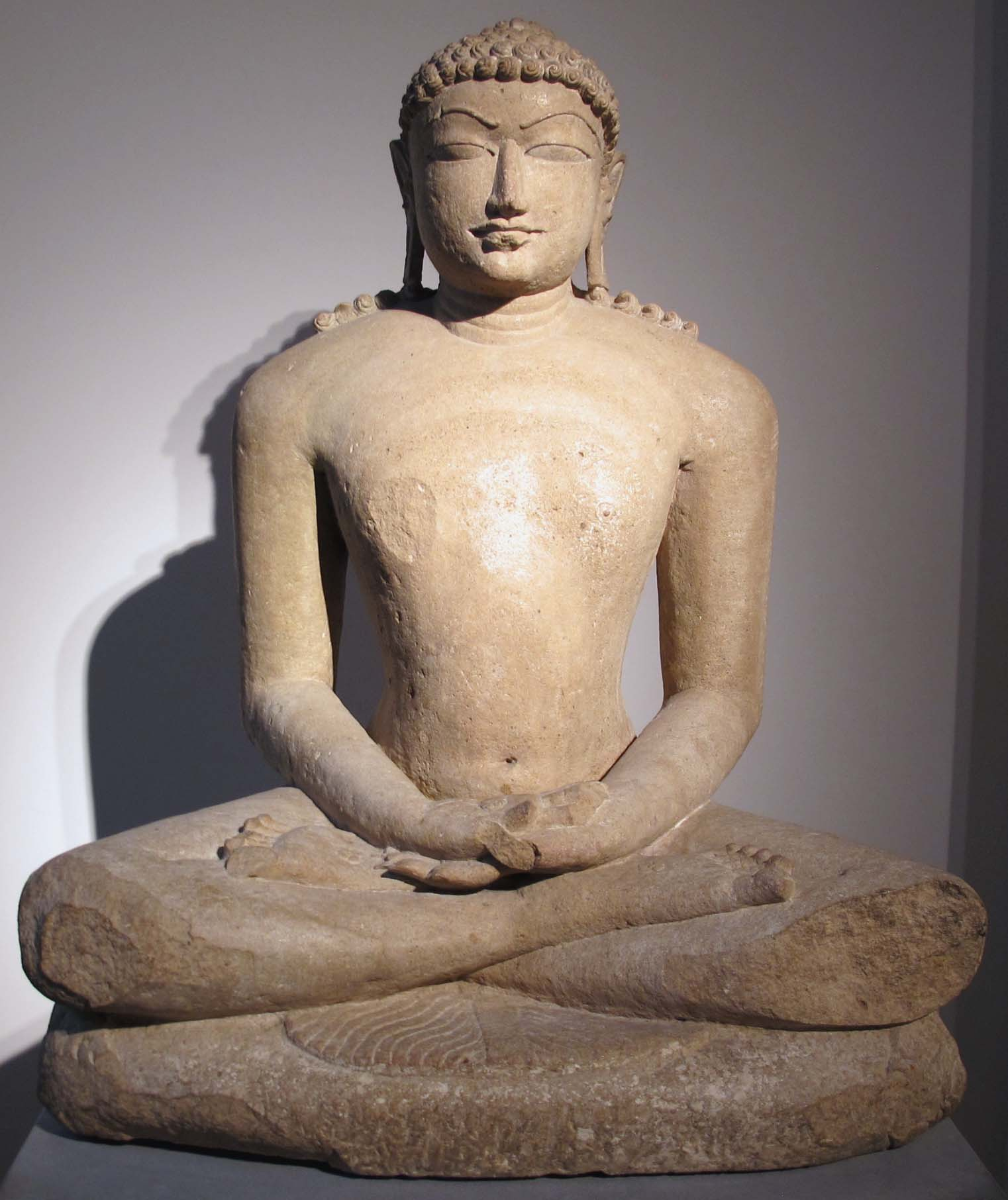
Rishabhanatha, sandstone, Madhya Pradesh, Chandela period, 10th–11th century

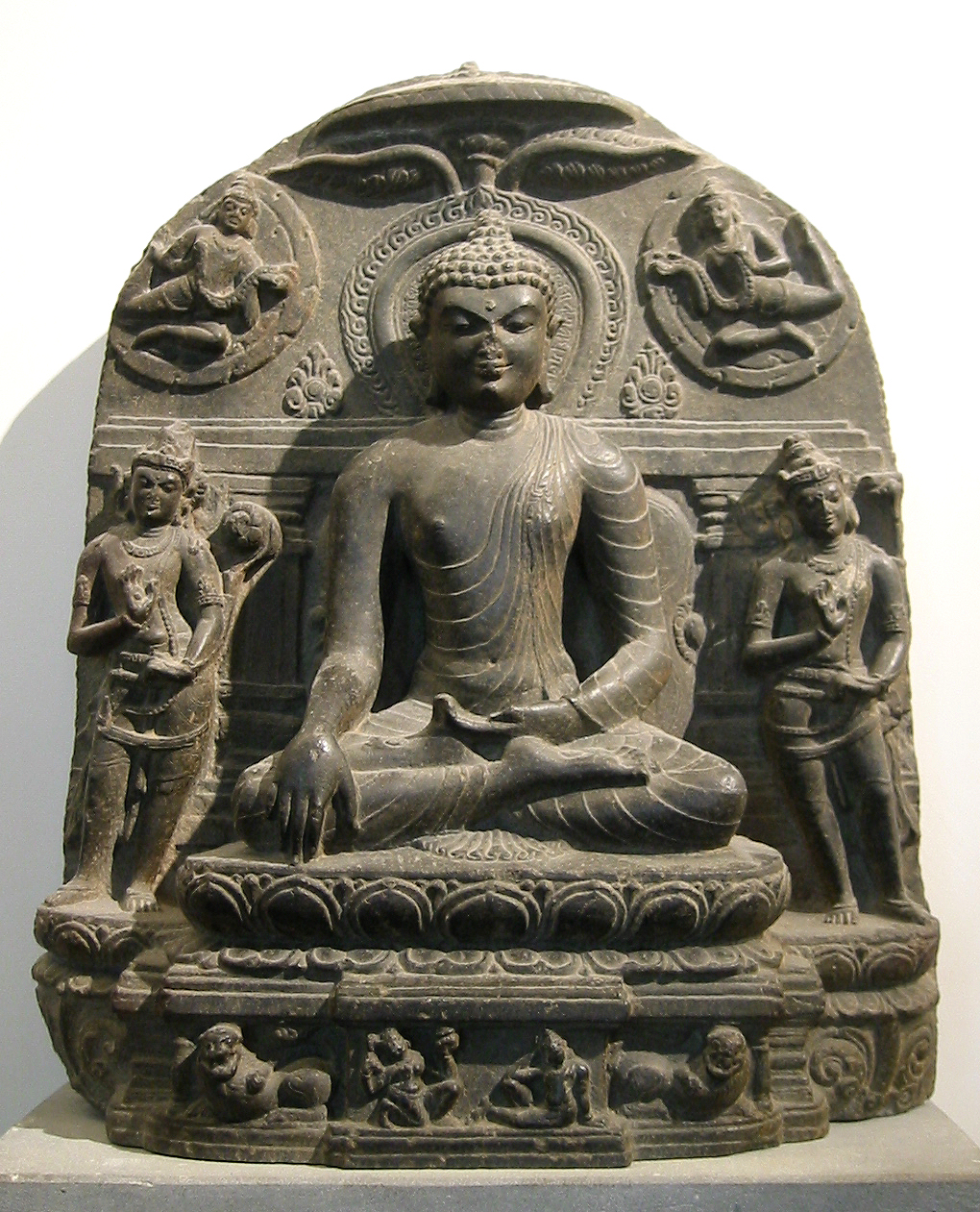
Buddha and Bodhisattvas, 11th century, Pala Empire

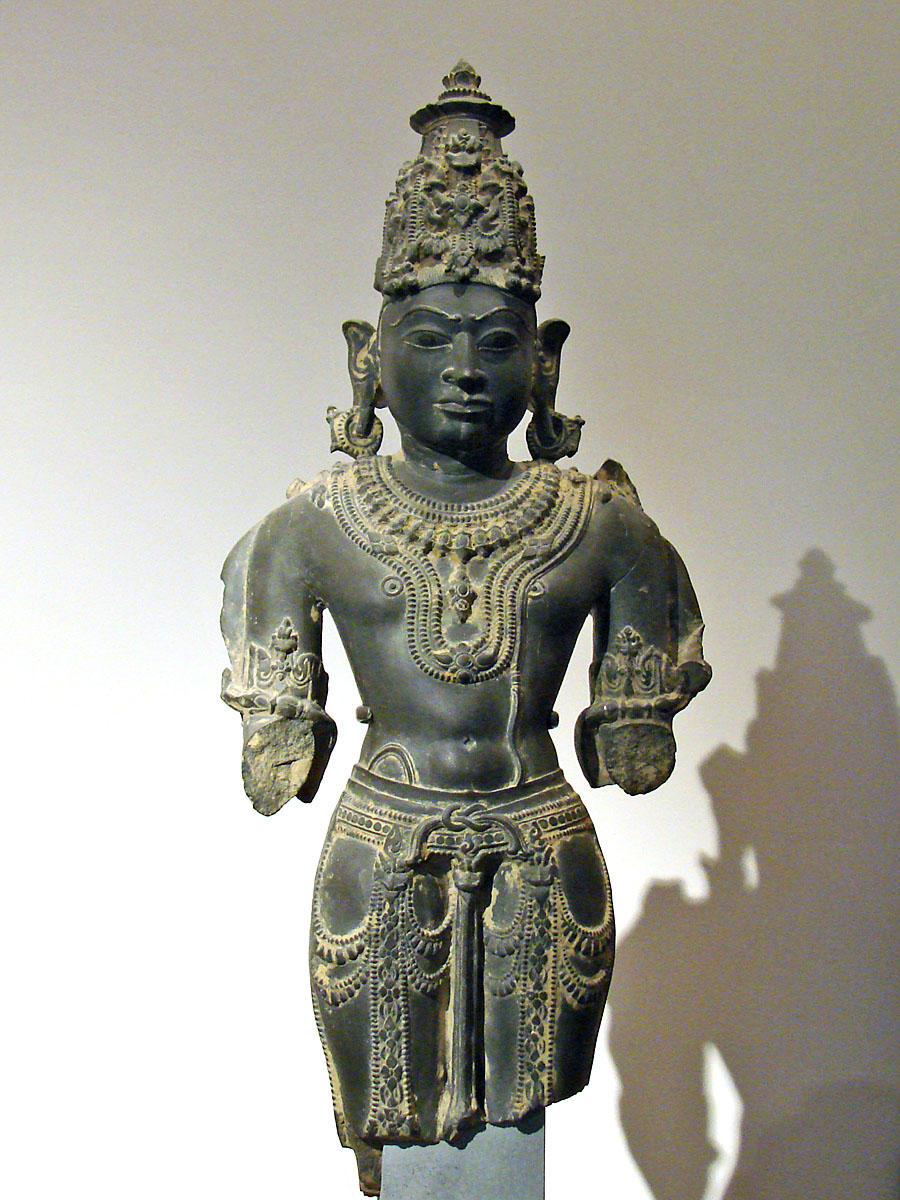
Vishnu, Madhya Pradesh, 11th–12th century

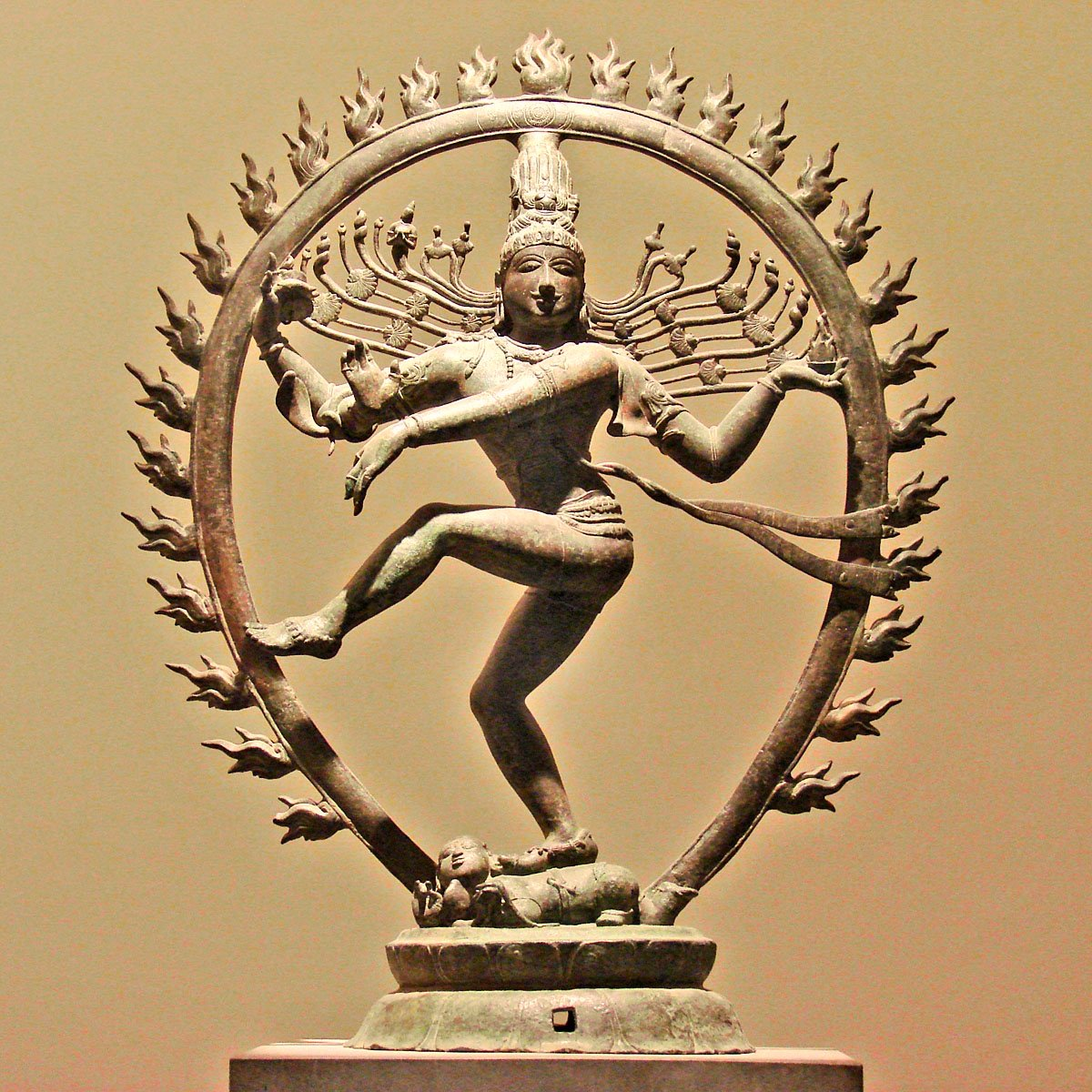
Shiva from Tamil Nadu, Chola period, 11th century

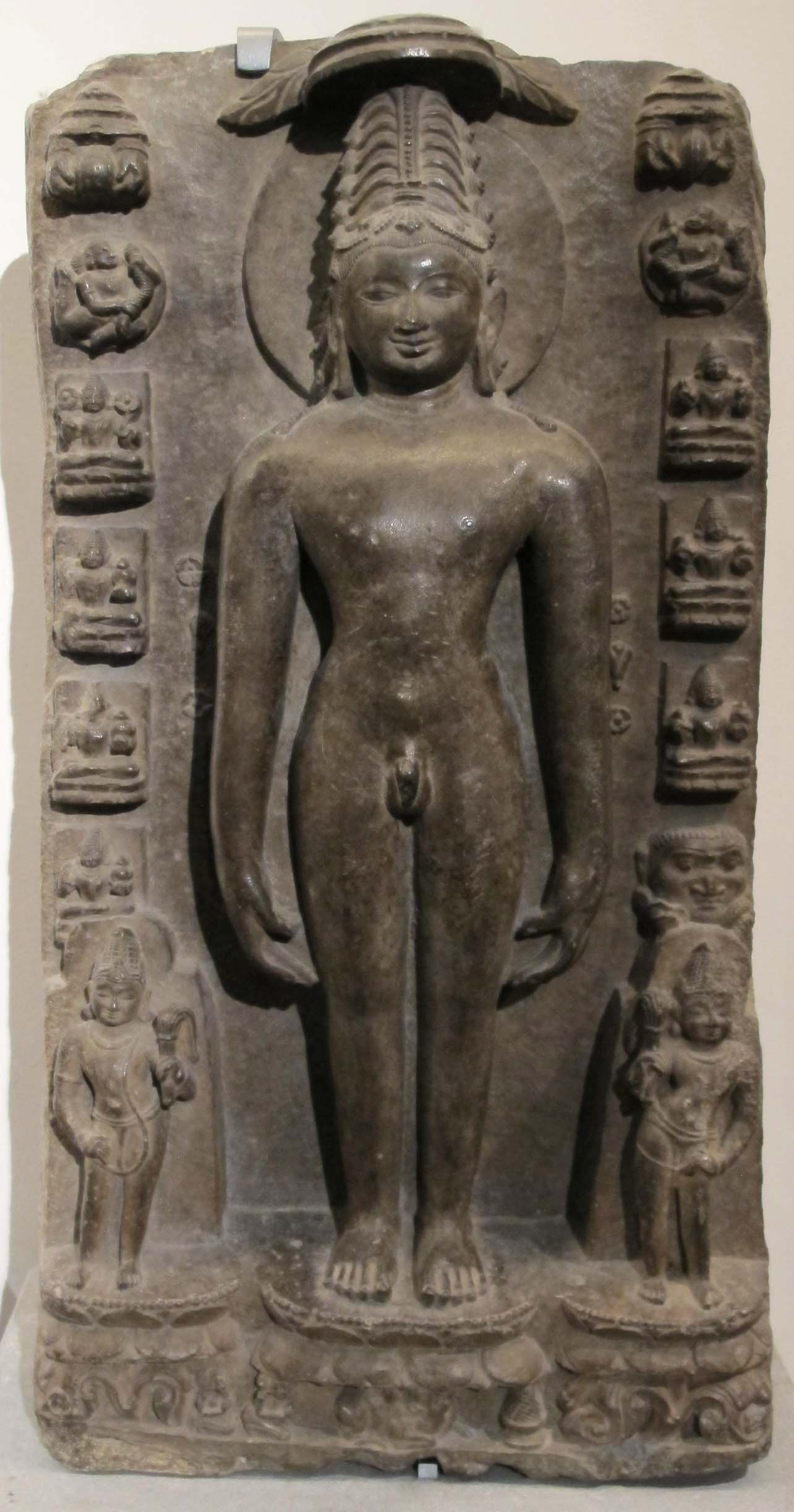
Rishabhanatha, 11th–12th century, Orissa

=== Southeast Asian art ===
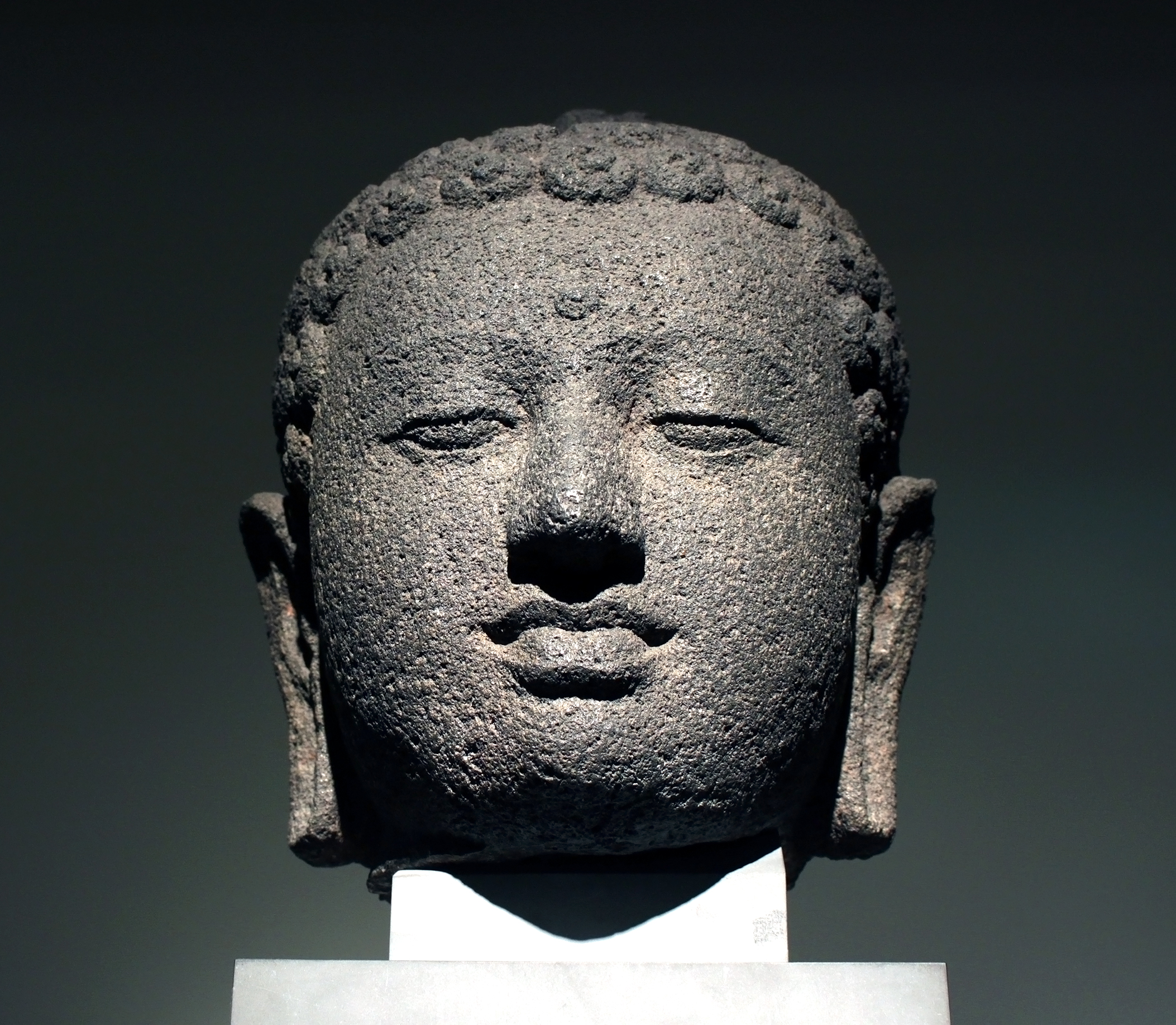
Head of Buddha taken from Borobudur, c. 8th–9th century Central Java, Indonesia

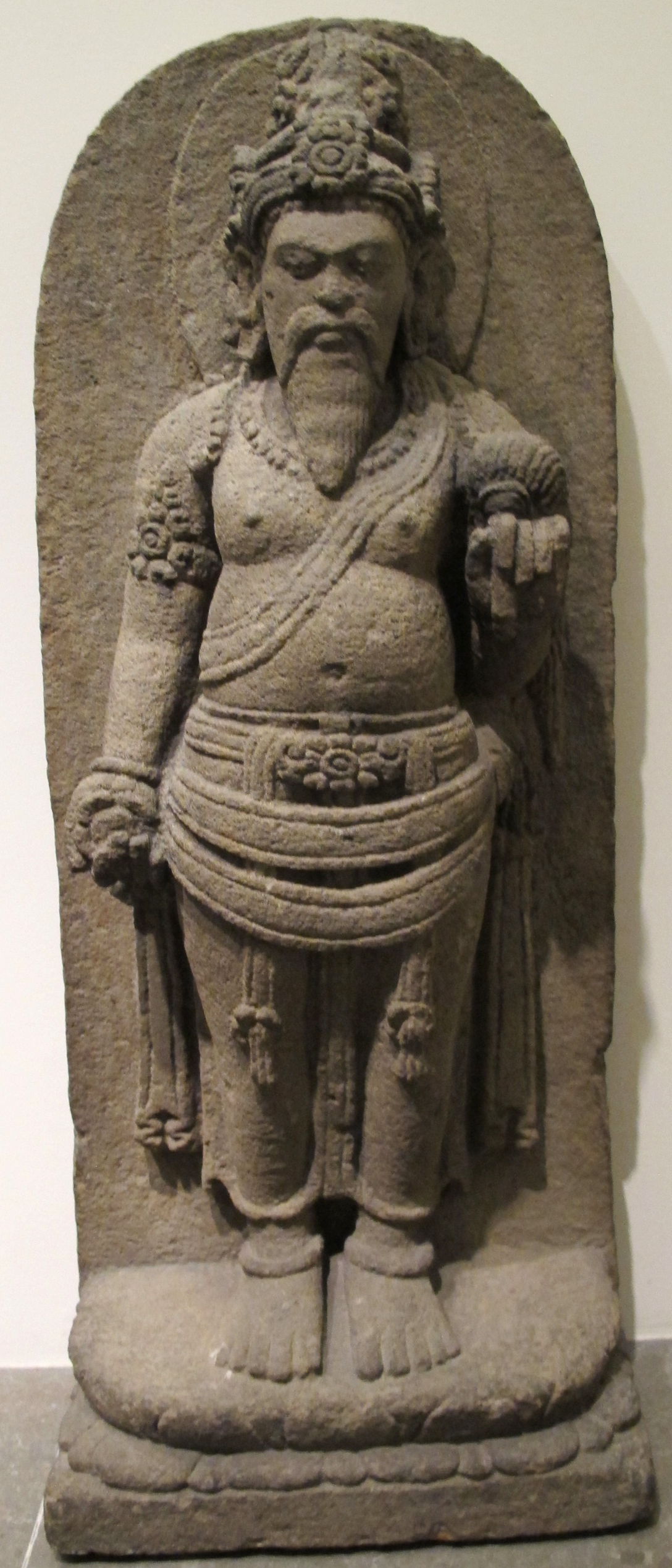
Agastya, c. 8th–9th century Central Java, Indonesia

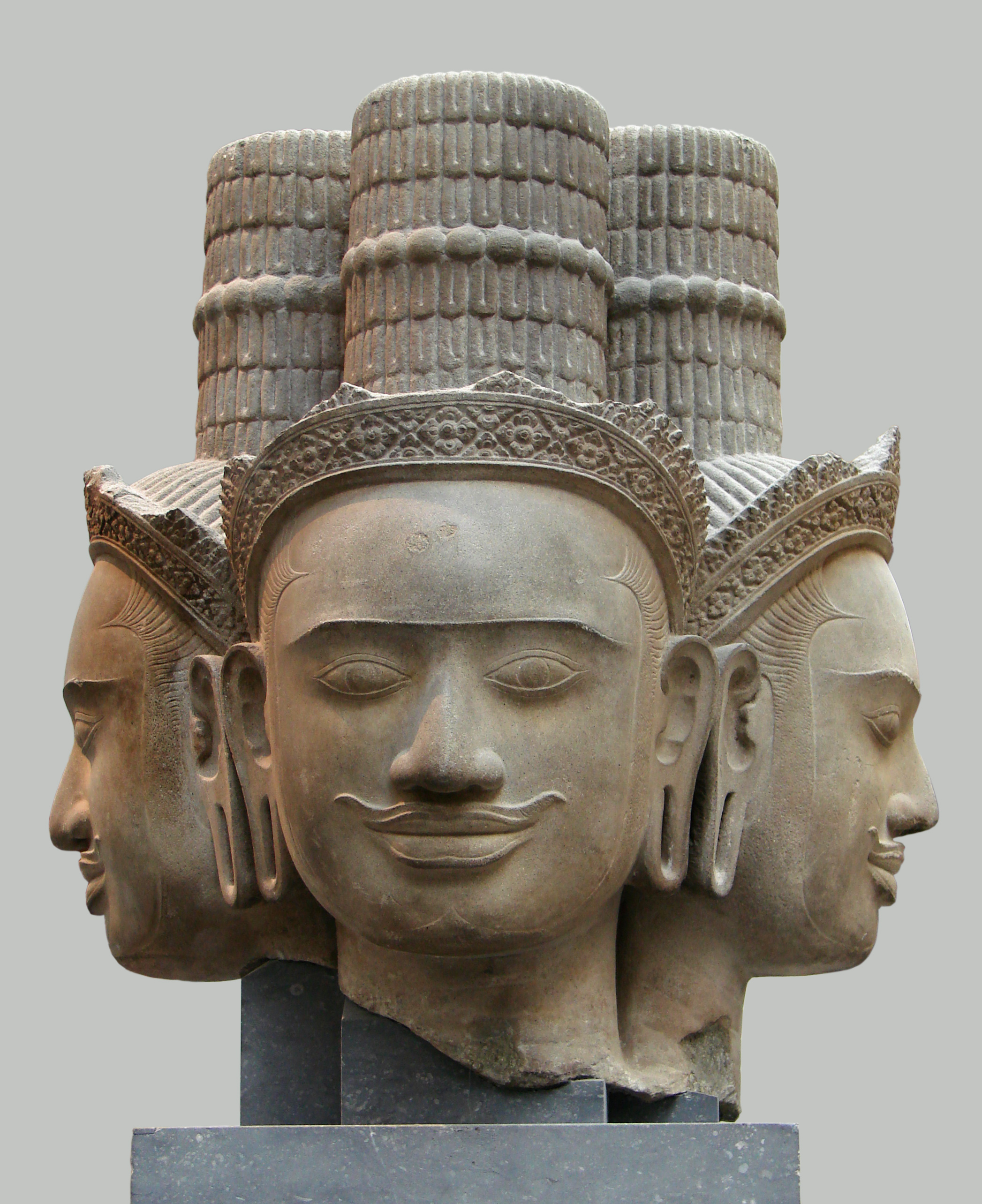
Hindu deity Brahma, Cambodia

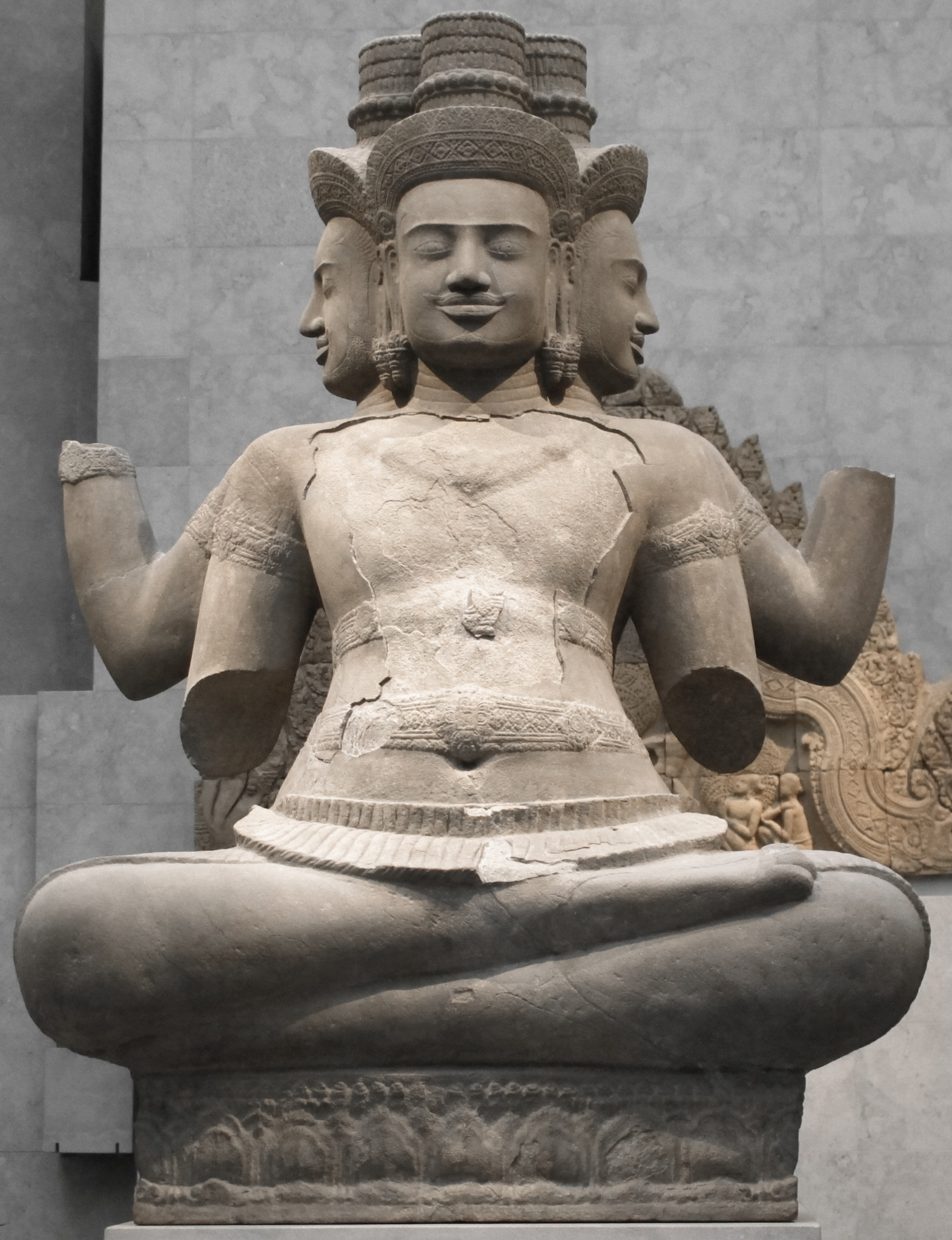
Brahma 10th century, Khmer art, Cambodia

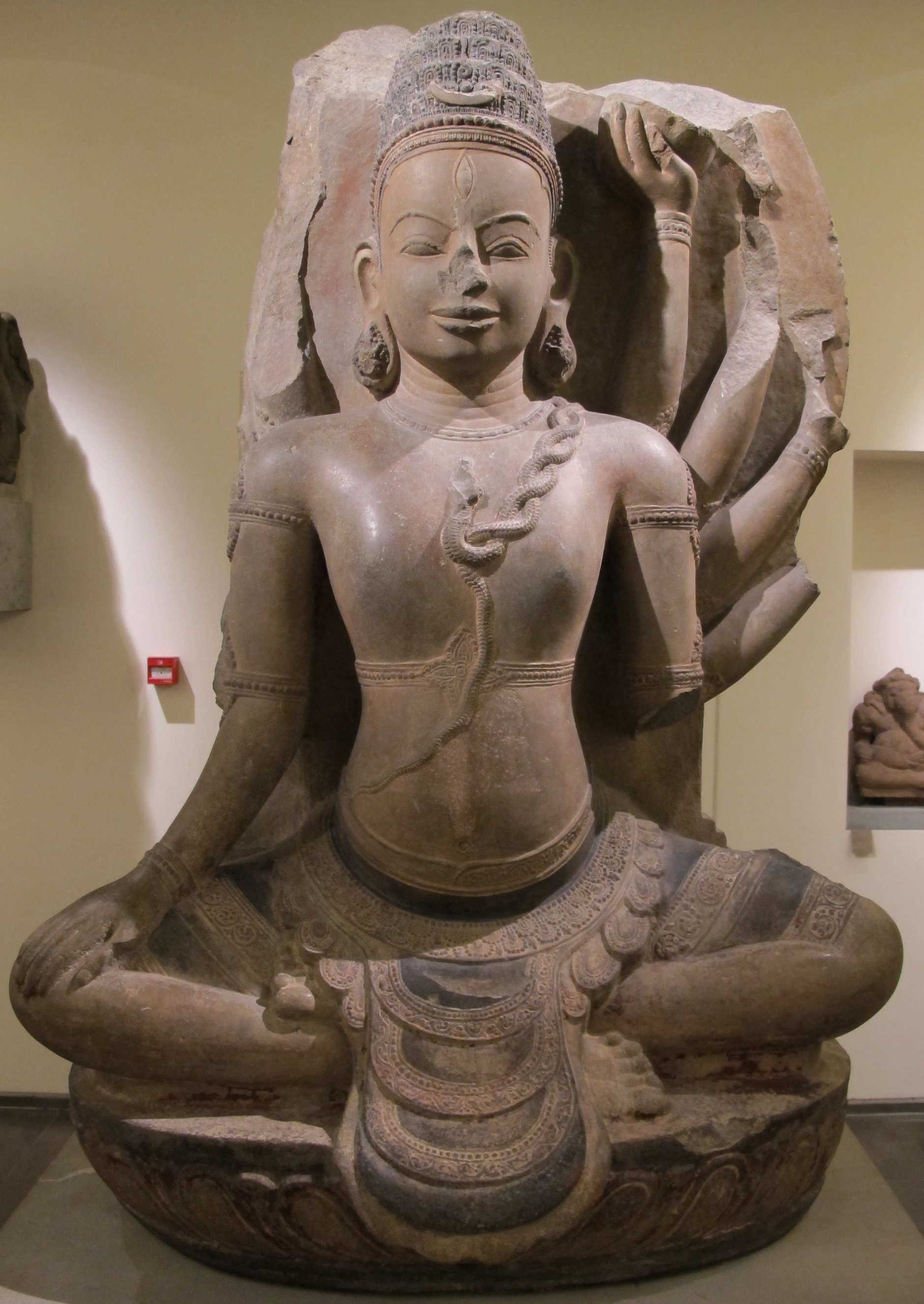
Shiva from Vijayapura, Vietnam

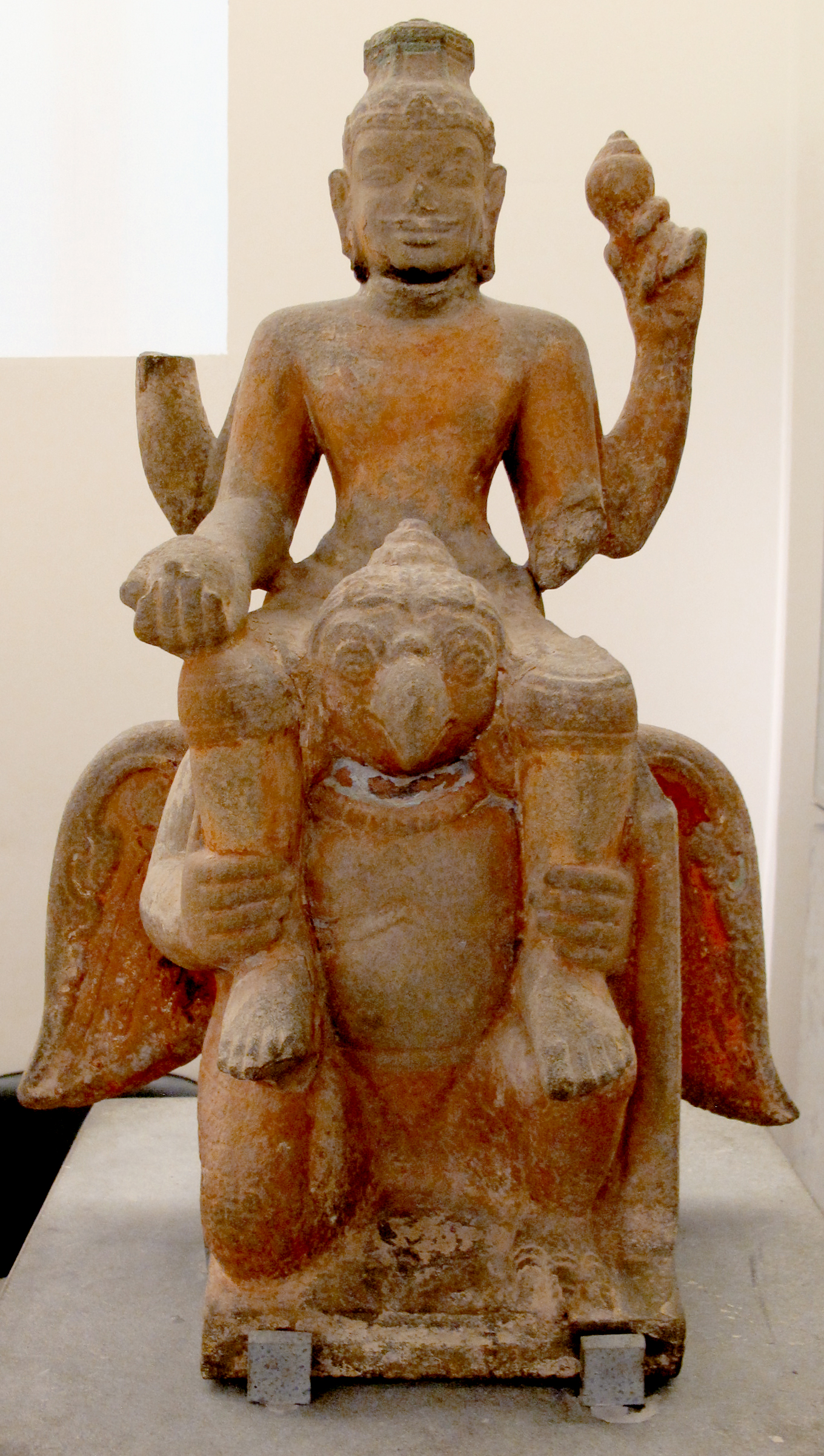
Vishnu on Garuda, Champa art, Vietnam

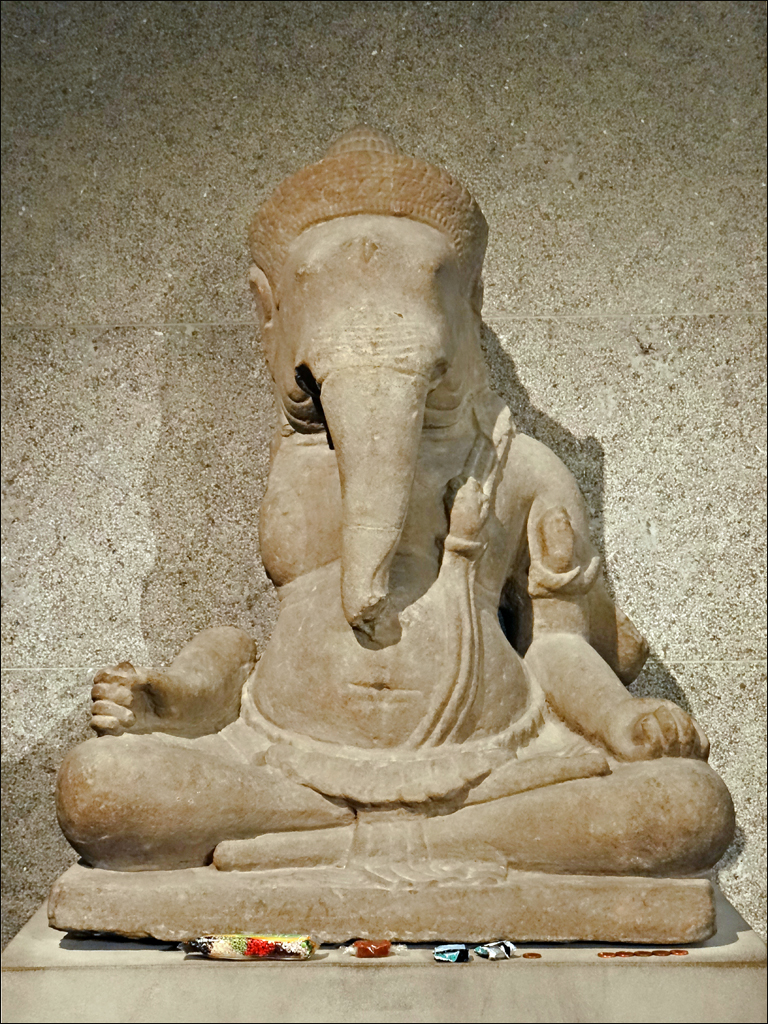
Ganesha, Siem Reap, Cambodia, c. 12th–13th century

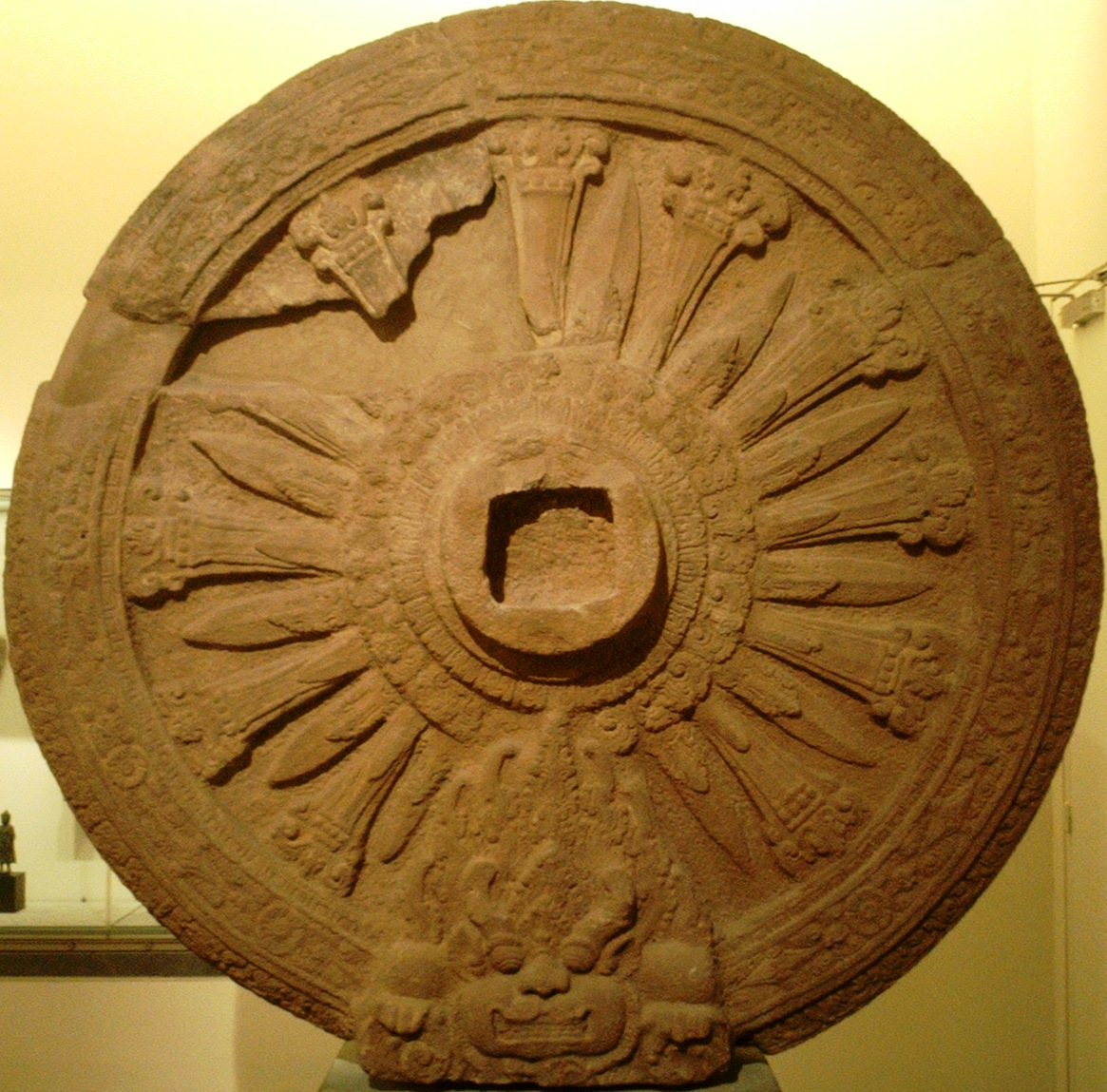
Mons Wheel of the Law (Dharmacakra), art of Dvaravati, c. 8th century

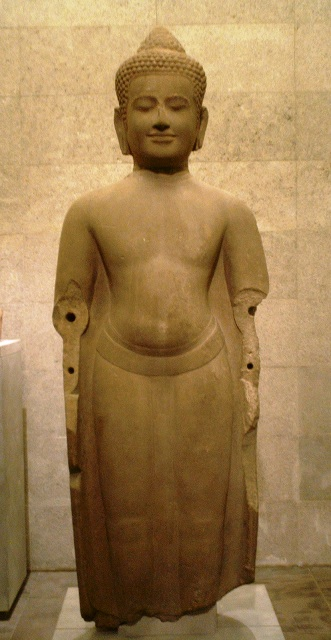
A Cambodian Buddha, 14th century

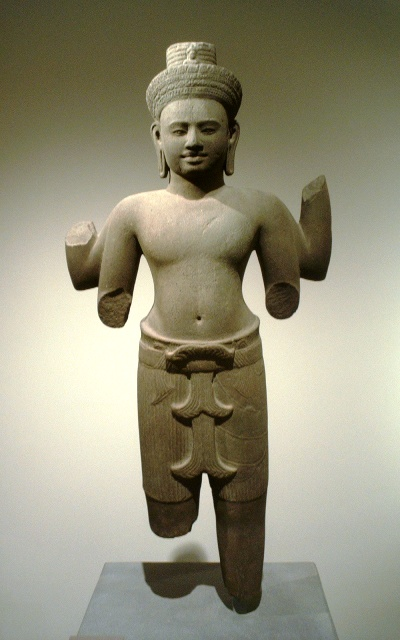
Bodhisattva Lokiteśvara, Cambodia, 12th century

== Controversies ==
In early 2024, the Parliament of the Central Tibetan Administration was joined by a group of Asian scholars published on 03 September by Le Monde, and by the French Senate's Tibet Support Group in strongly criticizing the museum for removing the word "Tibet" from its catalogues and exhibitions. Guimet Museum had changed the appellation of Tibet to "Himalayan World". It was also criticized for referring to Tibet by the Chinese name "Tubo", which is considered inappropriate, while other regions neighboring China are designated by their modern names.

When questioned on the subject by deputy Charles de Courson in March 2025, the Minister of Culture, Rachida Dati, defended the museum, arguing that the reference to the Himalayan world is long-standing and that other museums, such as the Metropolitan Museum of Art and the Smithsonian American Art Museum, use a similar categorization.

In July 2025, four associations filed a lawsuit with the administrative court to compel the Guimet Museum to rewrite the labels relating to Tibet, arguing that the museum's statutory mission is to be a tool for disseminating culture and knowledge, and that removing all references to Tibet contravenes this mission. For the France-Tibet association, this controversy illustrates China's political and cultural influence over the Guimet Museum.

In an opinion piece published in the newspaper Le Figaro in July 2025, the Guimet Museum refuted these accusations and denounced an "unfounded attack based on arguments that are more political than cultural and scientific."

== See also ==
- List of museums in Paris
