= Portrait of Irène Cahen d'Anvers =

Painting by Pierre-Auguste Renoir

- La Petite Irène (French)
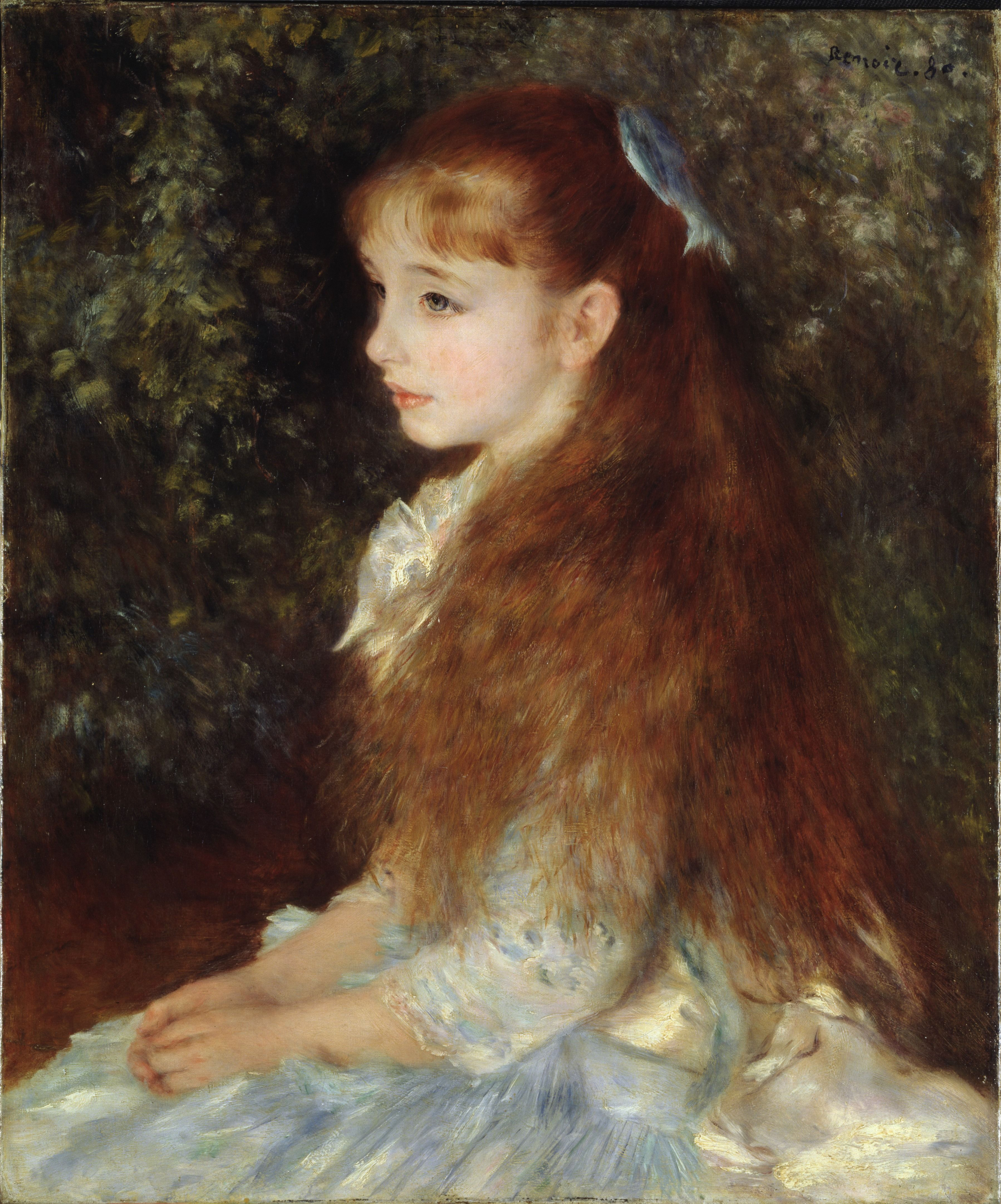
- Artist: Pierre-Auguste Renoir
- Year: c. 1880
- Medium: Oil on canvas
- Subject: Irène Cahen d'Anvers
- Dimensions: 65 cm × 54 cm (26 in × 21 in)
- Location: Foundation E.G. Bührle, Zürich

The Portrait of Irène Cahen d’Anvers, or The Little Girl with the Blue Ribbon (French: La Petite Fille au ruban bleu) or Little Irène (French: La Petite Irène), is an oil painting by French Impressionist artist Pierre-Auguste Renoir. The painting is on display in the Foundation E. G. Bührle collection in Zürich.

Commissioned by the wealthy French Jewish banker Louis Cahen d'Anvers in 1880, the painting depicts his daughter Irène Cahen d'Anvers at the age of 8. During World War II, the painting was stolen by the Nazis during their organised looting of European countries. In 1946 it resurfaced and was exhibited in Paris as one of the "French masterpieces found in Germany".

== History ==
In the 1870s-80s, Renoir frequently painted portraits for the families of the Parisian Jewish community. Through the collector Charles Ephrussi, proprietor of the Gazette des Beaux-Arts, Renoir met Louis Cahen d'Anvers. The Cahen d'Anvers family was one of the wealthiest Jewish banking families in Paris. In 1880, Louis Cahen d'Anvers commissioned two portraits of his three daughters, the eldest of whom was Irène. The younger daughters Alice and Élisabeth would become the subject of a later painting by Renoir, now commonly known as Pink and Blue.

The Portrait of Irène Cahen d'Anvers, also commonly called Little Irene, is considered today as one of Renoir's masterpieces. At the time, for an unknown reason, Louis was so dissatisfied with the painting that he hung it in the servants' quarters and delayed Renoir's payment of 1500 francs.

In 1883, the painting was first exhibited in the first exhibition dedicated exclusively to Renoir, held in Paul Durand-Ruel's Boulevard des Capucines gallery. In 1910 the painting was purchased by the wealthy Camondo family, into which Irène had married in 1891.

After the fall of France, the painting was looted from Château de Chambord by the Nazis. Like many other important pieces of European art, it became a part of Hermann Göring's personal collection, Göring later traded the painting with Gustav Rochlitz for a Florentine Tondo. In 1946, Portrait of Irène Cahen d'Anvers resurfaced and was exhibited in Paris as one of the "French masterpieces found in Germany". The painting along with dozens of other artwork stolen by the Nazis was later acquired by Emil Georg Bührle, a Swiss industrialist, art collector of German origin and CEO of the armaments company Oerlikon, a wartime supplier of the German military. The painting remains part of the Foundation E.G. Bührle Collection in Zürich.

== Irène Cahen d’Anvers ==
Irène Cahen d’Anvers (1872–1963), the subject of this painting, was 8 years old at the time of the portrait. The eldest daughter of the wealthy Jewish French banker Count Louis Cahen d'Anvers, she married Count Moïse de Camondo in 1891, aged 19. They separated in August 1897 after her affair with de Camondo's stable master, Count Charles Sampieri (1863-1930), whom she would later marry and divorce.

Irène had two children with de Camondo, Nissim and Béatrice. During World War I Nissim became a fighter pilot of the French Air Force and was killed in action in 1917 over Lorraine. In 1935, Moïse de Camondo bequeathed his Parisian mansion, at 63 rue de Monceau, including its contents and a major collection of art, to the Musée des Arts Décoratifs to be used to create the Musée Nissim de Camondo in honour of his and Irène's son. During World War II, Béatrice, her ex-husband Leon Reinach and their two children were murdered by the Nazis in Auschwitz because of their Jewish ancestry. Irène spent the war in hiding in Paris (apartment rue de la Tour) using her Italian name and passport. As her daughter Béatrice's sole inheritor, Irène received the large de Camondo fortune, that she would squander in the casinos of the French Riviera. Irène also had a daughter with Sampieri, Claude Germaine (1903-1995), who would marry the French fighter ace and race car driver André Dubonnet. Irène lived until 1963 and died in Paris, aged 91.

== Legacy ==
In 2014, it appeared in the war film The Monuments Men as one of the pieces of art saved by the Monuments, Fine Arts, and Archives programme. In 2018, Little Irène gained popularity in Japan when it was exhibited in The National Art Centre in Tokyo, as part of a series on Impressionist artworks on loan from the Foundation E. G. Bührle.

== See also ==
- List of paintings by Pierre-Auguste Renoir
