= Louis Cahen d'Anvers =

French-Jewish banker (1837–1922)

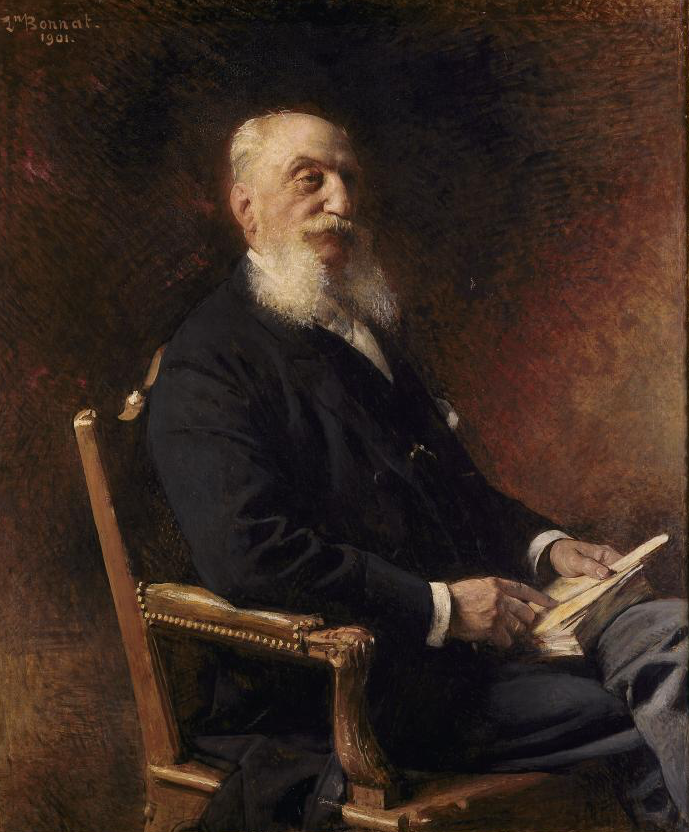
- Born: Louis Raphaël Cahen d'Anvers; 24 May 1837; Antwerp, Belgium
- Died: 20 December 1922 (aged 85); Paris, France
- Occupations: Banker, politician

Count Louis Raphaël Cahen d'Anvers (24 May 1837 – 20 December 1922) was a French banker.

== Life and family ==
Born in 1837 as the son of Meyer Joseph Cahen d'Anvers and Clara Bischoffsheim (1810–1876), he was a scion of two wealthy Jewish banking families. He married Louise de Morpurgo, who was from a wealthy Sephardi Jewish family from Trieste.

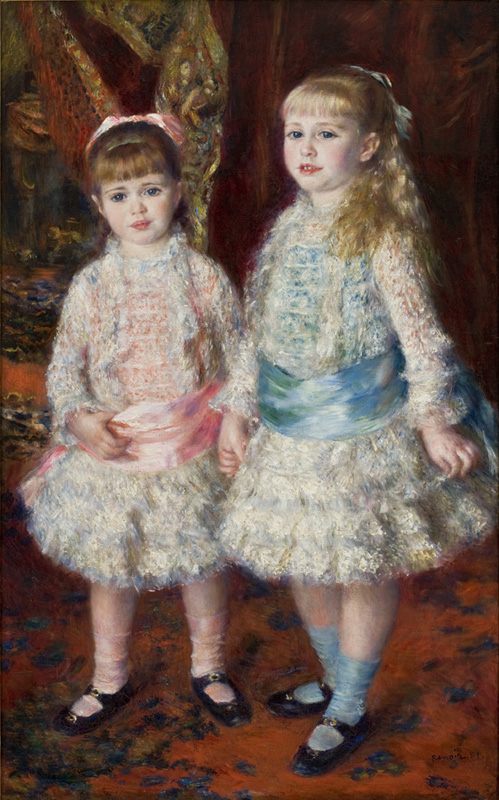
Pink and Blue (Alice on the left)

Two of their daughters, Alice (1876–1965) and Elisabeth (1874–1944 KZ Auschwitz), were painted by Pierre-Auguste Renoir in Pink and Blue in 1881. Alice married Major General Sir Charles Townshend and was the grandmother of Belgian-American journalist Arnaud de Borchgrave.

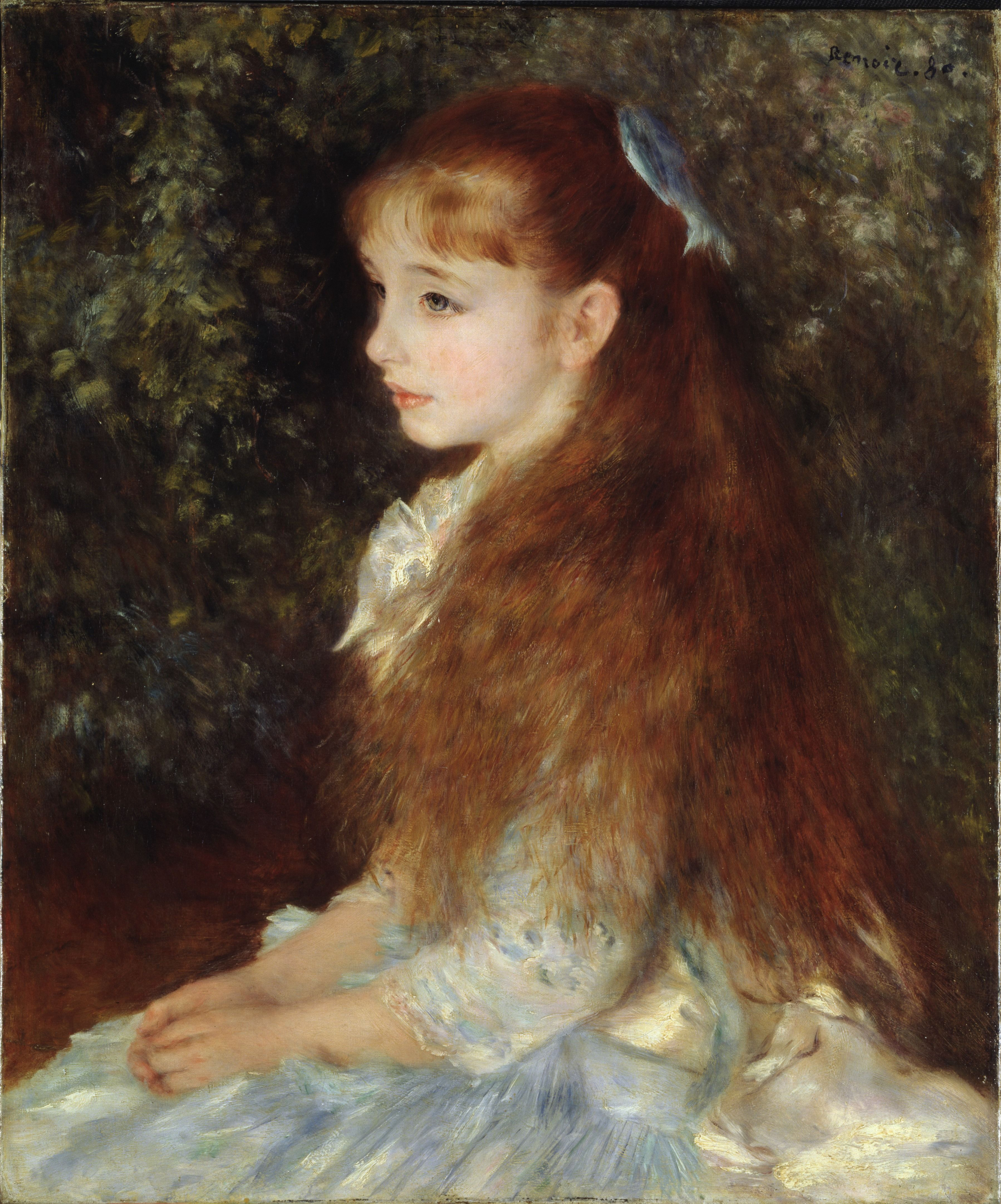
Little Irène

A third daughter, Irène (1872–1963), was the subject of a Renoir painting entitled Little Irène in 1880. Louis was so dissatisfied with the painting that he hung it in the servants' quarters and delayed payment of only 1500 francs. Irène married Moïse de Camondo in 1891 and divorced in 1902. During the Nazi occupation of France, Irène survived by escaping to a villa in the south of France. Her daughter, Béatrice, was murdered in the Auschwitz concentration camp.
