= Moïse de Camondo =

Jewish banker of Ottoman-Italian origin (1860-1935)

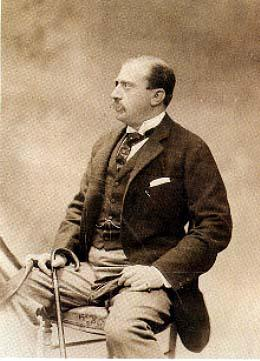
- Born: 15 March 1860; Istanbul, Ottoman Empire
- Died: 14 November 1935 (aged 75); Paris, France
- Spouse: Irène Cahen d'Anvers (m. 1891)
- Children: Nissim (1892–1917); Béatrice (1894–1944)

Count Moïse de Camondo (15 March 1860 – 14 November 1935) was an Ottoman Empire-born French banker and art collector. He was a member of the prominent Sephardic Jewish Camondo family.

== Biography ==
As a child, Camondo moved with his family from their home in Istanbul, Ottoman Empire, to Paris around 1869, where he grew up and continued the career of his father, Nissim de Camondo (1830-1889), as a banker. He was born into a Sephardic Jewish family that owned one of the largest banks in the Ottoman Empire, established in France since 1869.

Starting in 1911, he completely rebuilt the family's Parisian mansion on the Parc Monceau in order to house his collection of 18th-century French furniture and artwork. Working closely with the architect René Sergent, he created a palatial home conforming to certain 18th-century traditions, even planning the room dimensions to match exactly the objects in his collection. The entryway is inspired by the Petit Trianon of Versailles. The home includes a kosher kitchen with separate sections for meat and dairy. The dining room includes a beautifully-carved green marble fountain in the shape of a shell, with a dolphin spigot for the ritual washing of hands before eating a meal.

Some highlights of his collection include a French silver service that had been ordered by Russian Empress Catherine the Great, a set of Buffon porcelain (with exact reproductions of ornithological drawings) from the Sèvres manufacturer, and perhaps the only existing complete set of Gobelin royal tapestry sketches. His decisions on items to purchase were influenced by curators at the Louvre and the Union Central des Arts Décoratifs.

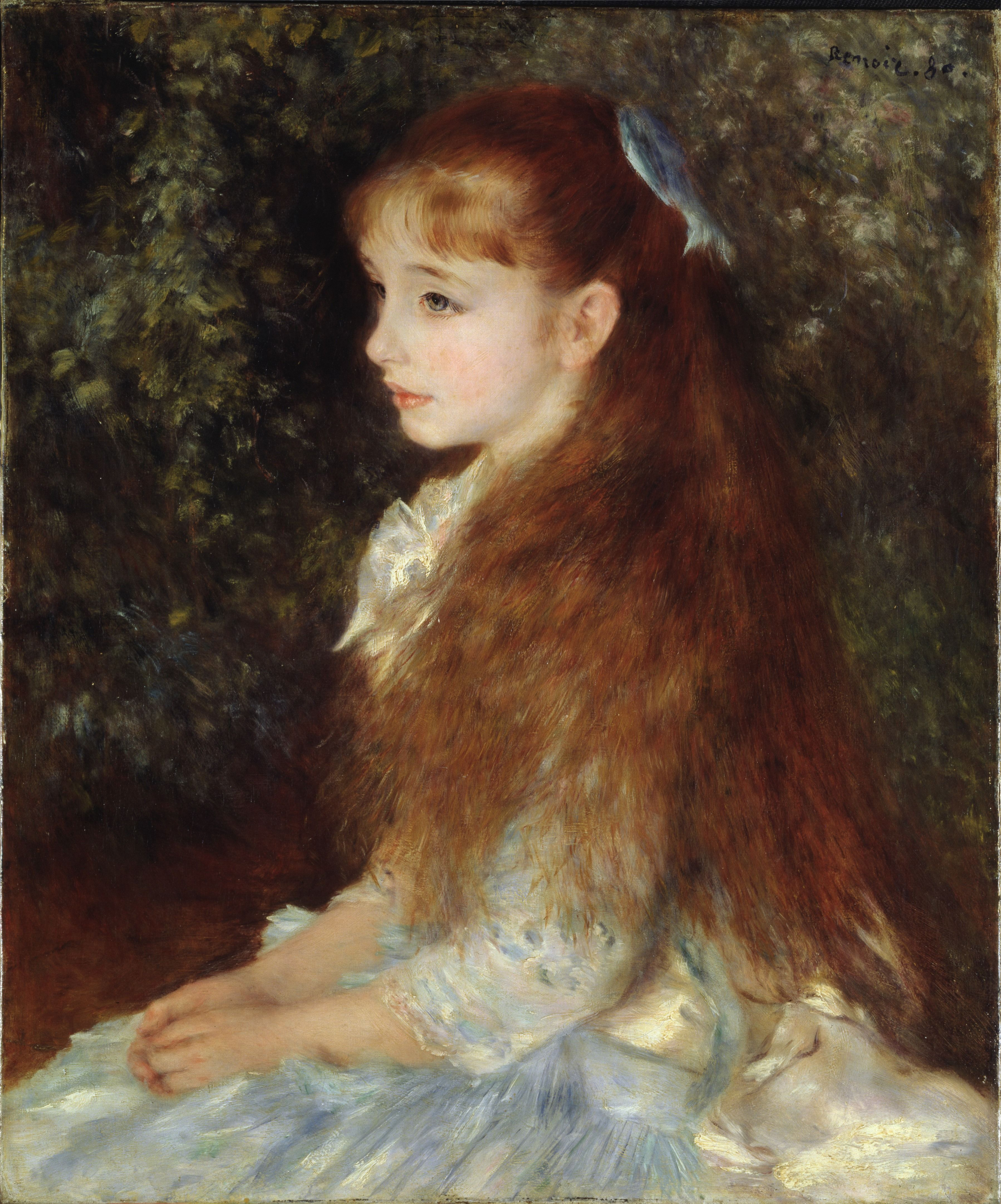
Portrait of Irène Cahen d'Anvers by Renoir in 1880

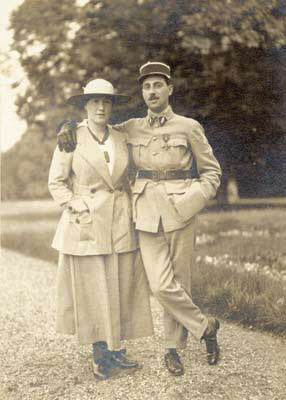
Nissim and Béatrice de Camondo in 1916

He married Irène Cahen d'Anvers (1872 -1963), daughter of Louis Cahen d'Anvers, in 1891. They separated in August 1897 after her affair with de Camondo's stable master, Count Charles Sampieri, whom she would later marry and divorce after her divorce from Camondo in 1902. The children, Nissim and Béatrice, remained with de Camondo. The mansion was completed in 1914, but his son did not reside there very long, as he rejoined the French Army to fight in The Great War. It had been de Camondo's great hope that his son, whom he adored, would take over the family empire.

Following Nissim's death in 1917, de Camondo closed all banking activities. He largely withdrew from society and devoted himself primarily to his collection and to hosting dinners for a club of gourmets at regular intervals. Camondo died in 1935, and the museum opened the following year.

He donated the home to Paris's Decorative Arts society as a museum (Musée Nissim de Camondo) in honor of the loss of his son Nissim in World War I. In addition to the collection, the meticulously-restored service areas, elevator and woodwork of the mansion are noteworthy.

During the German occupation of France during World War II, his daughter, Béatrice, her ex-husband, Léon Reinach, and their two children, Fanny and Bertrand, were all murdered in the Auschwitz concentration camp. Irène, the Ex-wife of Moise spent the war in hiding in Paris (apartment rue de la Tour) using her Italian name and passport. As her daughter Béatrice's sole inheritor, Irène received the large de Camondo fortune, that she would squander in the casinos of the French Riviera.
