= House of Camondo =

Jewish family of financiers and philanthropists

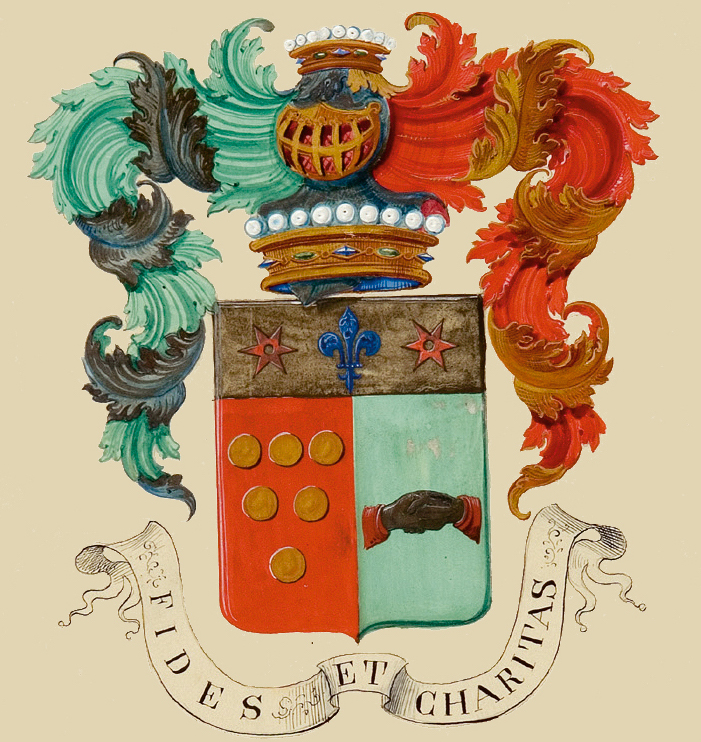
The coat of arms granted in the Kingdom of Italy around 1867 to Abraham Salomon Camondo

The Camondo family was a prominent Jewish family of financiers and philanthropists who were active in Europe and the Ottoman Empire.

== History ==
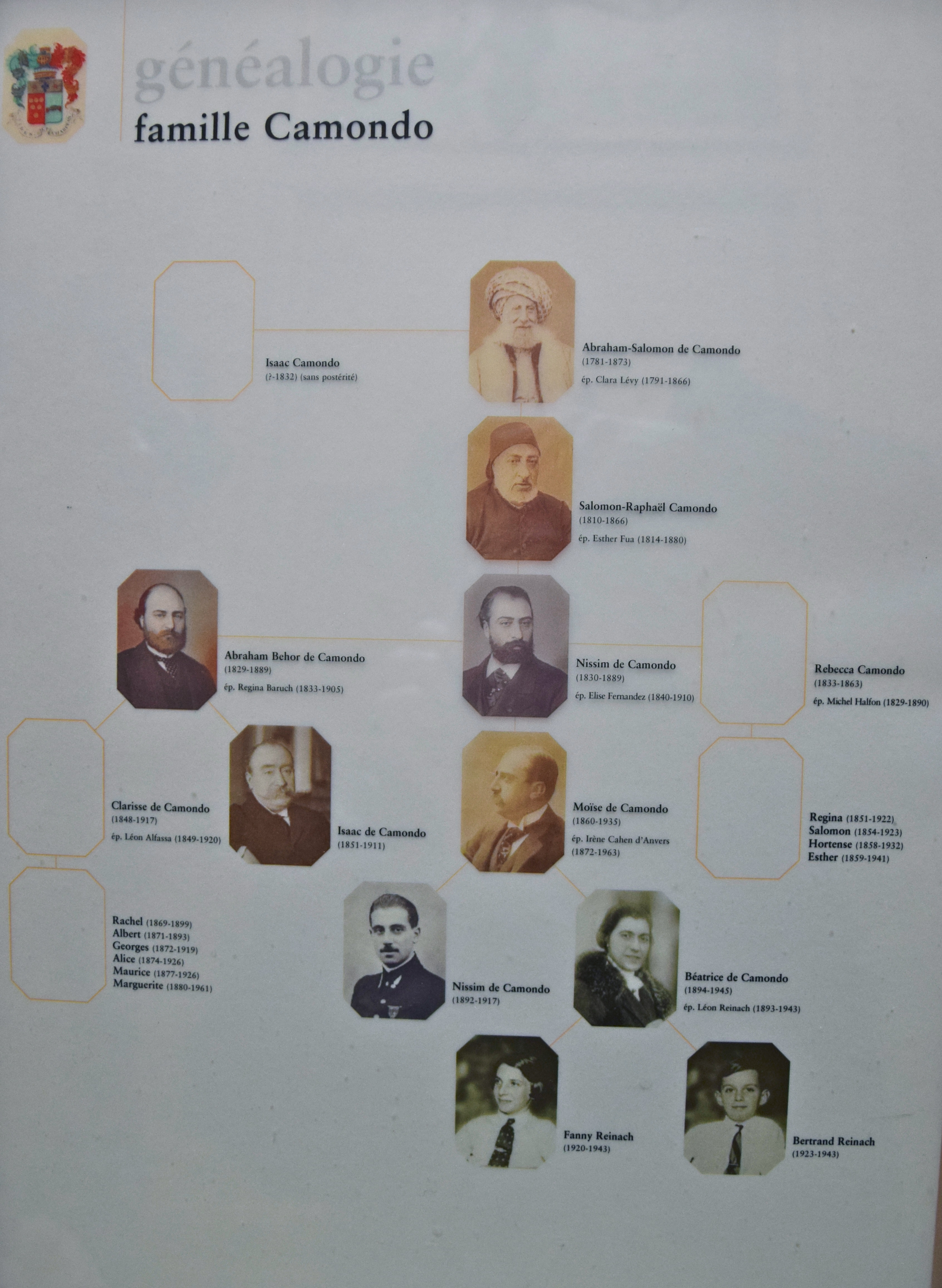
Family tree

The Camondo family was once part of the Sephardic community in Spain, but the family settled in Venice after the 1492 Spanish decree that ordered the expulsion of all Jews who refused conversion to Catholicism. There, some of its members became famous for their scholarship and for the services which they rendered to their adopted country. Following the Austrian takeover of Venice in 1798, members of the Camondo family travelled between Vienna and Istanbul. Despite the many restrictions and sumptuary laws imposed on non-Muslims, the family flourished as merchants in the business section at Galata, on the outskirts of the city. They branched into finance in 1802 with the founding of their own bank, named Isaac Camondo & Cie.

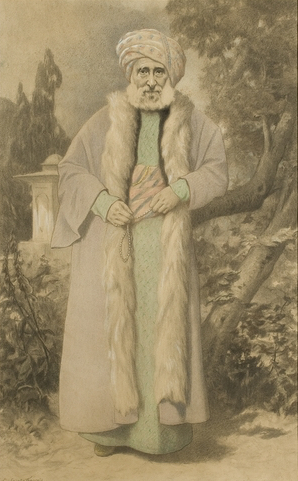
Abraham Salomon Camondo

Upon the death of Isaac Camondo in 1831, his brother Abraham Salomon Camondo inherited the bank. He prospered greatly and became the prime banker to the Ottoman Empire until the founding in 1863 of the Imperial Ottoman Bank. In 1865, he relinquished his Austrian citizenship to become a national of the recently created Kingdom of Italy. In recognition of his contributions and financial assistance to the liberation of Venetia from the Austrian Empire, Abraham Salomon Camondo was ennobled as a hereditary count in 1867 by King Victor Emmanuel II of Italy. The operations of the Camondo bank reflected the transformation of the Jewish community in Constantinople and beyond it, and of the Ottoman financial system. Its ledger of real estate transactions was originally held in Hebrew from 1833 to 1858, then in Italian until 1866, then in French.

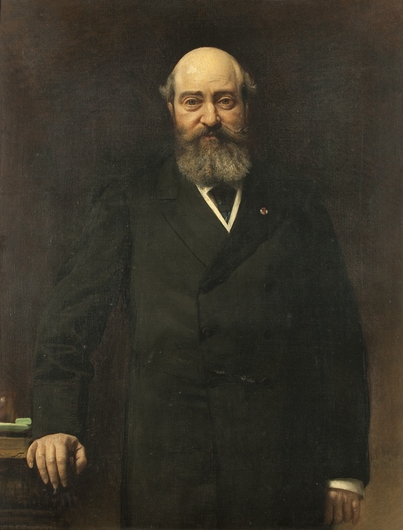
Abraham Behor Camondo

In 1869, Abraham Salomon Camondo's grandsons Abraham Behor Camondo (1829–1889) and Nissim Camondo (1830–1889) moved to Paris, France, a city the family had previously frequented and where they had established business connections. Abraham Salomon soon followed them there and died in Paris in 1873, but in accordance with his wishes, his remains were returned to Istanbul for burial there in the Jewish cemetery at Hasköy, a neighbourhood on the Golden Horn in Istanbul. His two grandsons remained in Paris and continued to successfully expand the banking business from there until their respective deaths, both in 1889, while keeping a strong link with their native Constantinople.

The next generation, cousins Isaac and Moïse Camondo, both based in Paris, did not display interest in further developing the family business. The banking operations in Constantinople were closed by decision of Isaac Camondo in 1894.

The banking branch of this family is now extinct after the last descendants died – Nissim de Camondo was killed in aerial combat during World War I in 1917, his father Moïse de Camondo died in 1935, then his sister Béatrice de Camondo, along with her two children (Fanny and Bertrand), and her ex-husband Léon Reinach were deported and murdered at Auschwitz around 1944 during World War II. However, there are several living descendants of Isaac Camondo, who was Abraham Salomon's brother and founder of the bank.

== Principal members of the Camondo family ==
Significant members of the family included:

- Abraham Salomon Camondo (1781–1873), Jewish-Turkish banker and philanthropist
  - Rafael Camondo (1810–1866)
    - Abraham Behor Camondo (1829–1889)
      - Isaac de Camondo (1851–1911)
    - Nissim Camondo (1830–1889)
      - Moïse de Camondo (1860–1935), French banker and art collector
        - Nissim de Camondo (1892–1917), French banker and World War I pilot
        - Béatrice de Camondo (1894–1944), French socialite

== Notable buildings associated with the family ==
=== Paris ===
The Musée Nissim de Camondo is located in the 8e arrondissement of Paris at 63 rue de Monceau, where Nissim Camondo lived from 1870 until his death in 1889, then his widow Elise until 1910. The property was then inherited by Moïse de Camondo, who had it torn down and rebuilt to a design by architect René Sergent, inspired by the Petit Trianon in Versailles. The building and its contents have been preserved in their state at the death of Moïse de Camondo in 1935.

From the late 1870s, Abraham Behar Camondo lived at 61 rue de Monceau, next door to his brother Nissim. He bought the land in 1870 and had a mansion built there to a design by architect Denis-Louis Destors, who also remodeled Nissim's house at number 63. His son Isaac de Camondo sold the estate in 1893 to industrialist Gaston Menier. In 1946, it became the headquarters of the Pompey Steelworks, which purchased it from the Menier family. Its interior arrangements were demolished during the late 1970s. In 2005, it became the Paris office of Morgan Stanley.

The Camondo bank's offices in Paris were at 31, rue La Fayette.

=== Istanbul ===
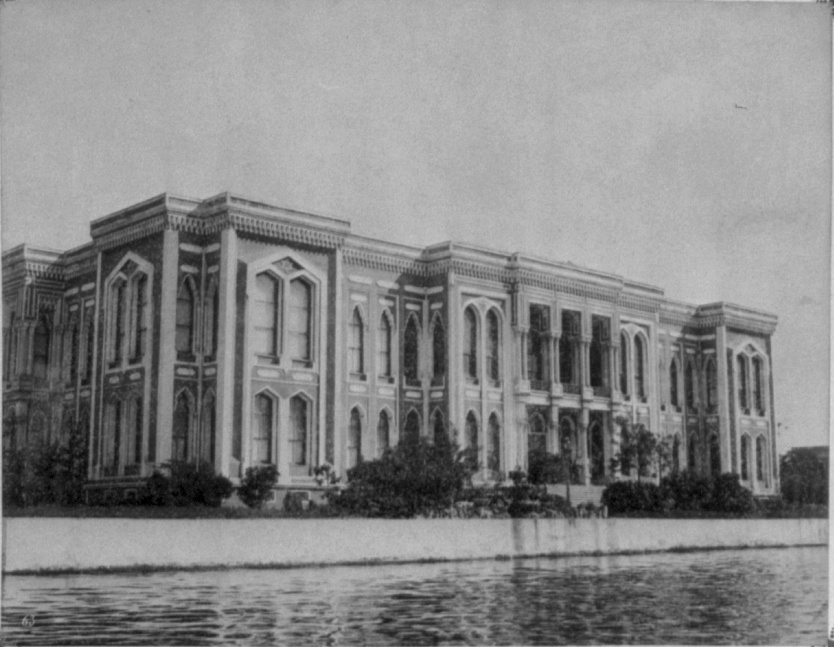
The seaside mansion of the Camondo family on the Golden Horn, located within the Kasımpaşa quarter to the west of Galata (modern Karaköy), was popularly known as the Camondo Palace (Kamondo Sarayı). It later became the headquarters of the Ministry of the Navy (Bahriye Nezareti) during the late Ottoman period, and is currently used by the Turkish Navy as the headquarters of the Northern Sea Area Command (Kuzey Deniz Saha Komutanlığı).

The seaside mansion of the Camondo family, popularly known as the Camondo Palace (Kamondo Sarayı), was built between 1865 and 1869 and designed by architect Sarkis Balyan. It is located on the northern shore of the Golden Horn, within the Kasımpaşa quarter of the Beyoğlu district, to the west of Galata (Karaköy). It later became the headquarters of the Ministry of the Navy (Bahriye Nezareti) during the late Ottoman period, and is currently used by the Turkish Navy as the headquarters of the Northern Sea Area Command (Kuzey Deniz Saha Komutanlığı).)

The Camondo family also built two historic apartment buildings in Galata, both of which are named Kamondo Apartmanı. The older one is located at Serdar-ı Ekrem Street near Galata Tower and was built between 1861 and 1868, while the newer one is located at the corner between Felek Street and Hacı Ali Street and was built in 1881; it was later converted into the upscale Galata Residence Hotel.

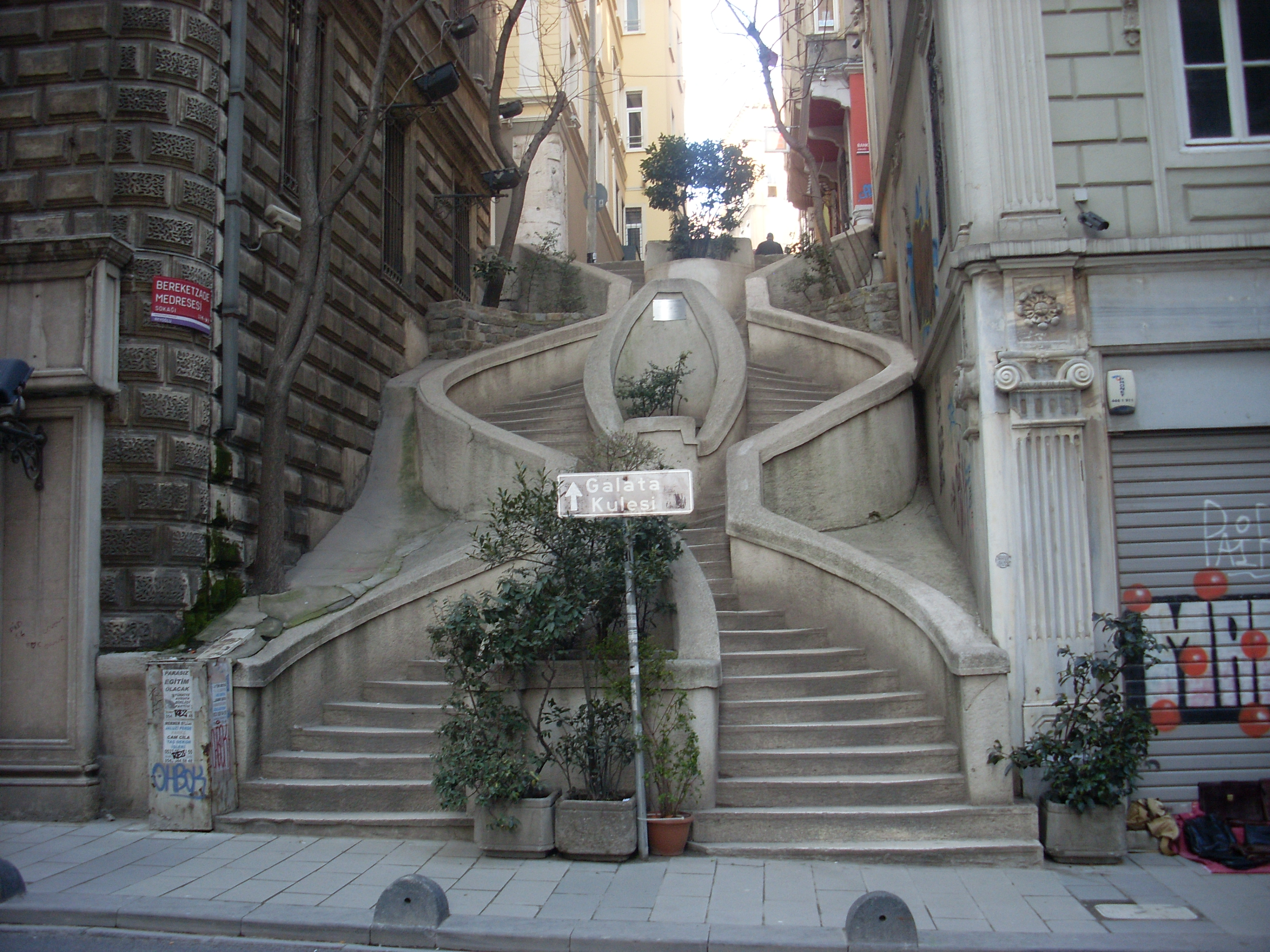
The Camondo Stairs at Bankalar Caddesi (Banks Street) in Galata (modern Karaköy), constructed by Abraham Salomon Camondo c. 1870–1880.

The Camondo Stairs (or Camondo Steps), a famous pedestrian stairway designed with a unique mix of the Neo-Baroque and early Art Nouveau styles, were built in circa 1870–1880 by Abraham Salomon Camondo. The stairway forms the part of Bereketzade Medresesi Sokağı (Bereketzade Madrasa Street) that connects Bankalar Caddesi (Banks Street) with Banker Sokak (Banker Street) in the Galata (Karaköy) quarter of Istanbul.

== See also ==
- History of the Jews in Turkey
