= Nissim de Camondo =

French military officer (1892–1917)

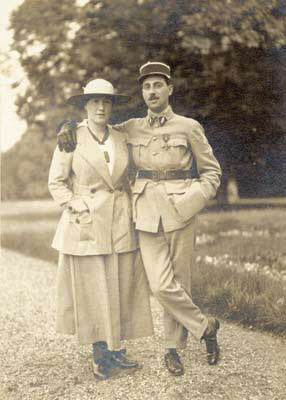
Nissim and his sister, Béatrice de Camondo, in 1916

Nissim de Camondo (23 August 1892 – 5 September 1917) was a French military officer and a member of the prominent Camondo family.

Born in Boulogne-Billancourt and named for his grandfather, he was the son of Moïse de Camondo, a wealthy Jewish banker, and countess Irène Cahen d'Anvers. As the only son of two children, Nissim de Camondo was expected to take over the family business.

However, immediately upon the outbreak of World War I, he joined the French army, then served as a pilot in the air force. Lieutenant Nissim de Camondo died in 1917 during aerial combat in Lorraine and was buried in the Montmartre Cemetery, in Paris.

On his death in 1935, Moïse de Camondo bequeathed his Parisian mansion at 63, rue de Monceau (including its contents and a major collection of art) to the Musée des Arts Décoratifs, to be used to create the Musée Nissim de Camondo in his son's honor.

During the German occupation of France during World War II, Camondo's sister, Béatrice, her ex-husband, Léon Reinach, and their two children, Fanny and Bertrand, all died in the Auschwitz concentration camp. Camondo's mother, Irène survived by escaping to a villa in the south of France.
