= Les Gentilshommes du Duc d'Orléans =

Painting by Henri Félix Emmanuel Philippoteaux

Les Gentilshommes du Duc d’Orléans dans l’habit de Saint-Cloud
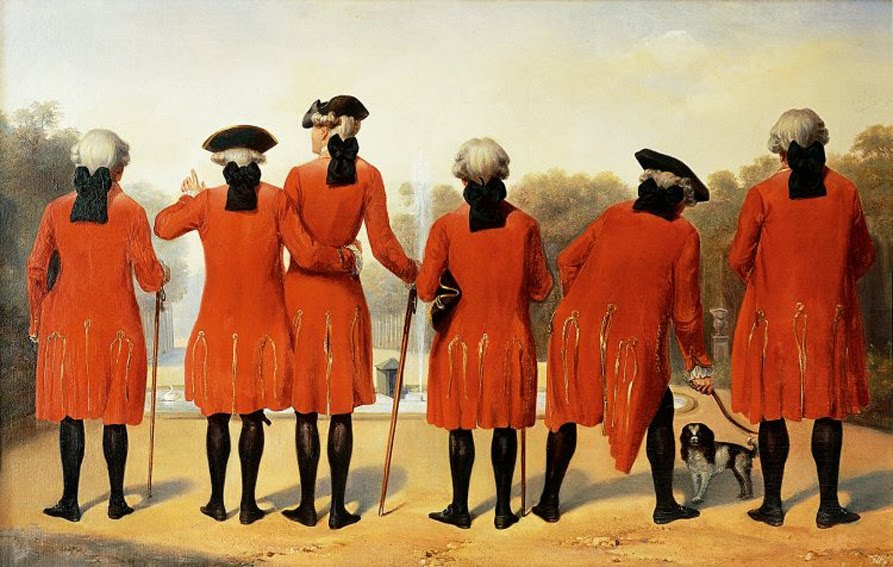
- Artist: Henri Félix Emmanuel Philippoteaux
- Year: 1839
- Type: Oil on canvas, history painting
- Dimensions: 59 cm × 61 cm (23 in × 24 in)
- Location: Musée Nissim de Camondo, Paris

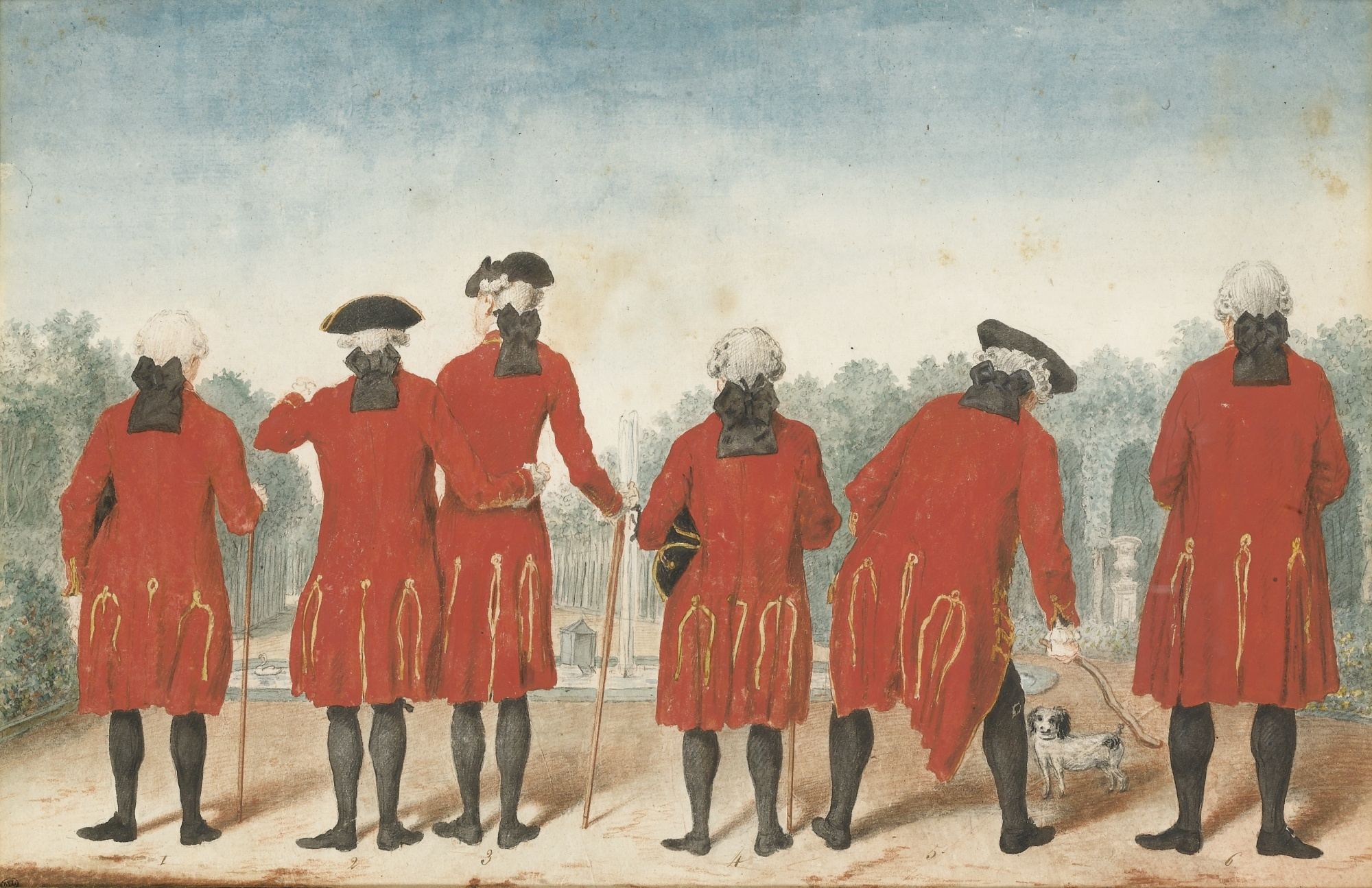
The original painting from the collection of the Famille de France, the former Royal Family of France, (1770)

Les Gentilshommes du Duc d’Orléans dans l’habit de Saint-Cloud (English: The Duke of Orléan's Gentlemen dressed in the frock coats of Saint-Cloud) is one of Henri Félix Emmanuel Philippoteaux best known paintings which he painted in 1839. However, this painting is only a copy of the original gouache by Louis Carrogis Carmontelle from 1770.

The painting shows six "gentlemen" (French: Gentilshommes) dressed in red frock coats and black stockings which was the outfit for the countryside of the House of Orléans. The six gentlemen are (from left to right): The Chevalier de Gax, the Marquis de Périgny, the Chevalier de Saint-Mars, the Chevalier d’Estrées, the Baron de Tourempé and the Chevalier Desparts.

This painting belonged to Prince Emmanuel, Duke of Vendôme. It was sold at auction with part of the Duke's estate when he died in 1931. Today the painting belongs to the collection of the Musée Nissim de Camondo (Inv. CAM 568).

In December 1987 an extract of the painting was the front cover of the magazine Vogue Décoration. The front cover showed the extract with the Chevalier de Gax (half of him), the Marquis de Périgny, the Chevalier de Saint-Mars and the Chevalier d’Estrées.

The painting is very popular and is often copied and re-used as a design for wallpaper, cushions et cetera.

On 29 September 2015 the original painting (gouache) by Louis Carrogis Carmontelle which belonged until this date to the estate of the late Comte de Paris (1908–1999), a descendant of the former Royal Family of France, and his wife the Comtesse de Paris (1911–2003), was sold by Sotheby's in Paris for EUR 531,000.
