= Isaac de Camondo =

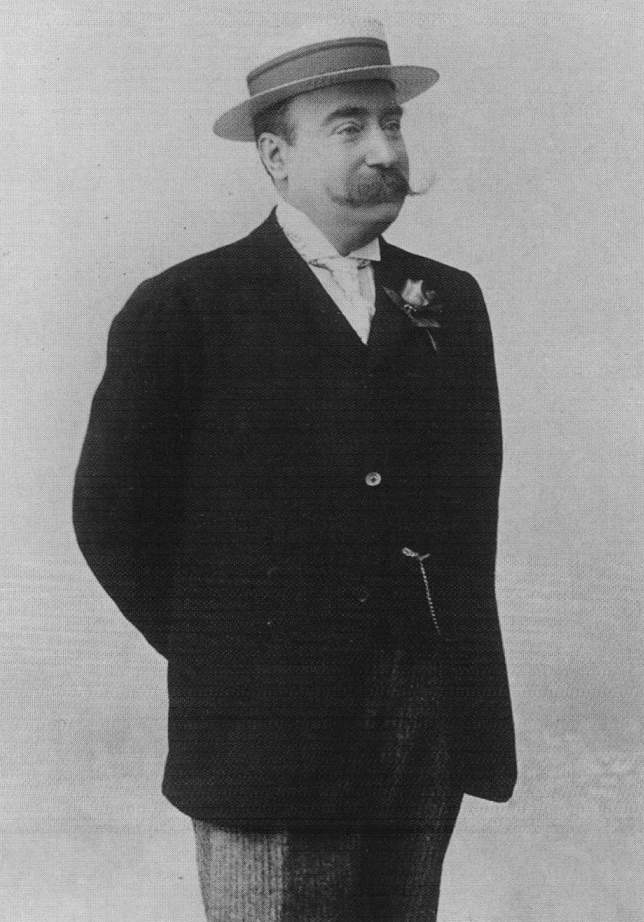
Photograph of Comte Isaac de Camondo circa 1890

Count Isaac de Camondo (born 3 July 1851 in Istanbul; died 7 April 1911 in Paris) was a member of the House of Camondo, noted primarily as an art collector with a noteworthy interest in the then "avant-garde" artists of the Impressionist and Post-Impressionist movements. He bequeathed his collection to The Louvre in 1908, for which a new suite of exhibition rooms was arranged on the second floor of the wing between the Pavillon Mollien and the Grande Galerie and opened in mid-1914.

He inherited the principal role in the family's banking business in 1889, but did not display interest in the bank's development and closed its Istanbul operations in 1894. He was also a skilled amateur composer.

A generous philanthropist who did not insist on giving his name to initiatives he sponsored, he was instrumental in the creation of the Société des amis du Louvre and in the establishment of the Théâtre des Champs-Élysées by Gabriel Astruc.
