= Camondo Stairs =

Stairway in Istanbul, Turkey

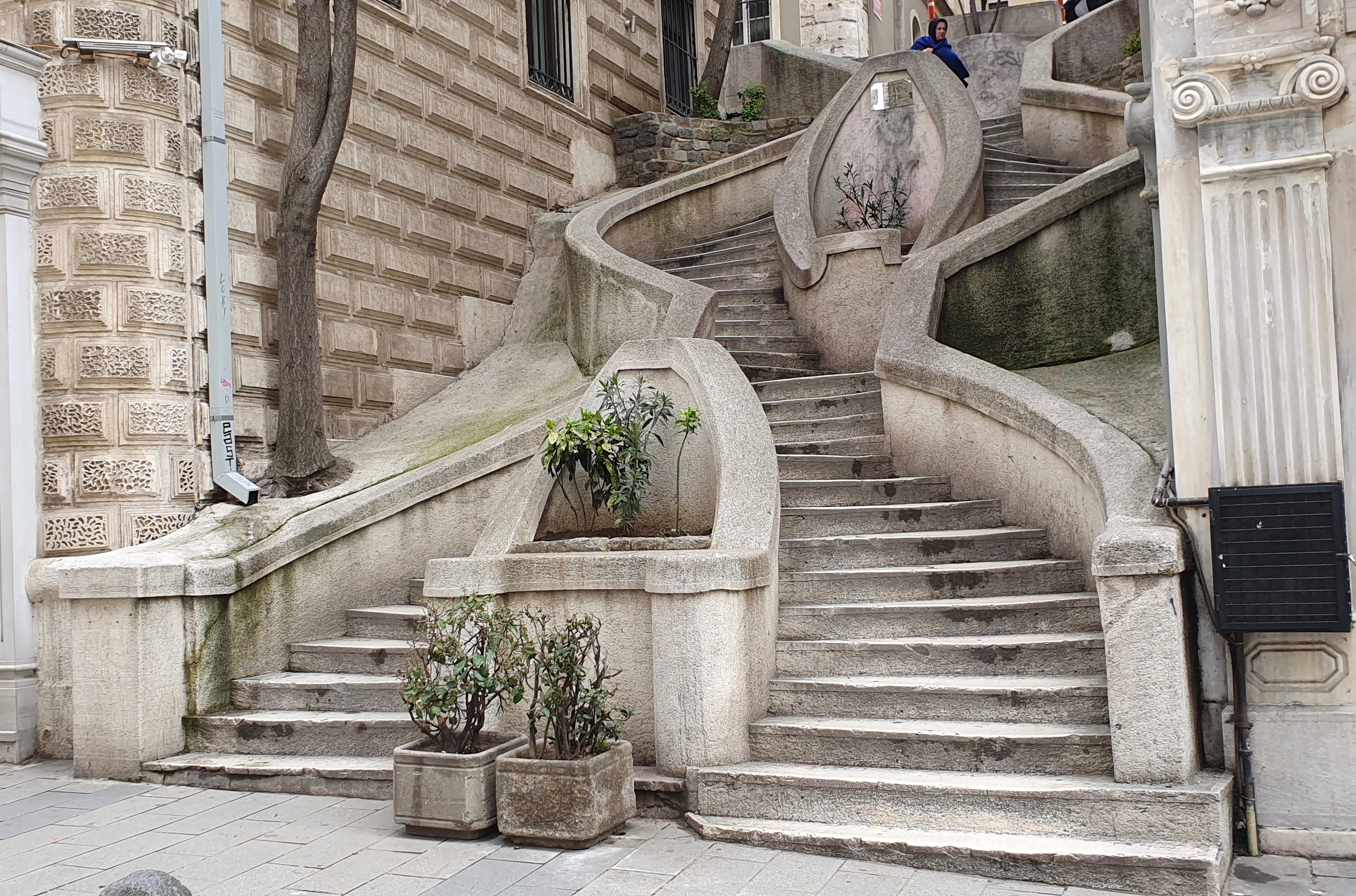
- The Camondo Stairs in 2023
- Location: Istanbul, Turkey
- Interactive map of Camondo Stairs

The Camondo Stairs (Turkish: Kamondo Merdivenleri) are 19th century stairs on Bankalar Caddesi (Banks Street) in the Galata quarter (modern Karaköy) of the Pera district (modern Beyoğlu) in Istanbul, Turkey.

The curvaceous stairs were designed in a unique mix of the Neo-Baroque and early Art Nouveau styles, and built circa 1870–1880 by the renowned Ottoman-Venetian Jewish banker Abraham Salomon Camondo, the patriarch of the House of Camondo.

The stairs link Bankalar Caddesi with Kart Çınar Sokak (the latter was known as Rue Camondo during the 19th and early 20th centuries). Abraham Salomon Camondo constructed the stairs to provide an easy connection between Kart Çınar Sokak, where he lived, and Bankalar Caddesi, where he worked. The stairs were also frequently used by his children who studied at the nearby St. George's Austrian High School.

The stairs were famously photographed by Henri Cartier-Bresson in 1964, and have featured in Barbara Nadel's crime novel Pretty Dead Things.

According to Lonely Planet, "The curvaceous 19th-century Camondo Stairs, one of Beyoğlu's most distinctive pieces of urban design, run south from Kart Çınar Sokak."
