= Abraham Salomon Camondo =

Ottoman-Italian financier and philanthropist (1781–1873)

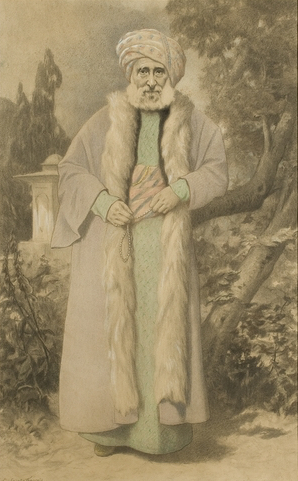
Abraham Salomon Camondo

Count Abraham Salomon Camondo (1781, Istanbul – 30 March 1873, Paris) was a Jewish Ottoman-Italian financier and philanthropist, and the patriarch of the Camondo family.

== Life and career ==
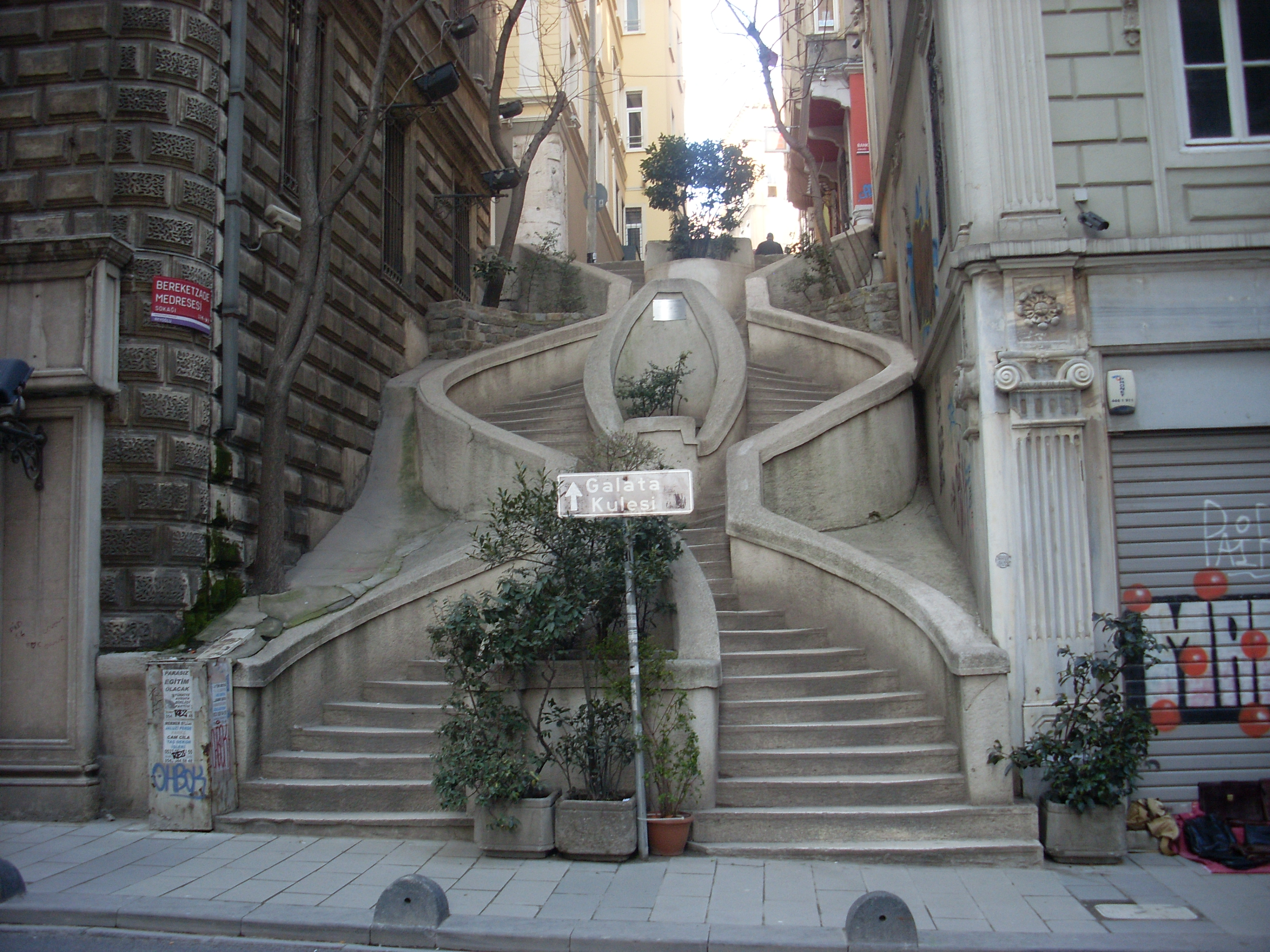
Camondo Stairs at Bankalar Caddesi (Banks Street) in Galata (modern Karaköy), Istanbul, constructed by Abraham Salomon Camondo in circa 1870–1880

He was born in Constantinople, during the Ottoman Empire. In 1832, he inherited a banking business and a fortune from his brother Isaac (who had died in Vienna a year before), and he was able to expand it greatly during his lifetime, partly through real estate investment. Camondo lived in the Galata district with his wife Clara, whom he had married on 25 May 1804, and their son Raphael (1810–1866).

While Venice was under Austrian rule, he received (as an Austrian subject) the title of Knight of the Order of Franz Joseph. In 1854, as the representative of the Austrian community of Constantinople, he and his family went to Vienna to attend the wedding of Emperor Franz Joseph. From his ancestors, who had settled in the Veneto, he had a cultural affinity with Italy and on 18 November 1865, he and all members of his family obtained Italian nationality. When Venice again became an Italian possession, Camondo, as a Venetian citizen, presented large gifts to several Italian philanthropic institutions. In recognition of this, King Victor Emmanuel II conferred upon him the title of count on 28 April 1867, with the privilege of transmitting the title in perpetuity to the eldest son of the family.

Count Camondo exercised substantial influence with the sultans Abdülmecid I and Abdülaziz, and over the Ottoman grand viziers and ministers. He was banker to the Ottoman government before the founding of the Ottoman Bank. He obtained from the Porte a firman extending the privilege of possessing real estate in the empire to foreign nationals, which until then had been restricted to subjects of the Ottoman Empire.

Camondo was active on behalf of other Jews. He established in Constantinople a central consistory for the Jews of the empire, of which he was almost continuously the president; he introduced reforms into the communal administration; and he founded in 1858 an educational institution, the Institution Camondo, at Peri Pasha, the poorest and most densely populated suburb of the capital. Shops for tailoring and shoemaking were soon added. On account of this school, its benevolent founder was excommunicated by certain fanatical rabbis, and he endured otherwise much vexation; yet it flourished for thirty-two years and trained the majority of the Jewish officials then in the service of the Ottoman government.

Dying at the age of 92 in Paris, where he had relocated by 1869, le comte de Camondo (as he was known in France) was buried according to his final wishes in his family's vault at the Jewish cemetery in Hasköy,Istanbul. His funeral took place on 14 April 1873, and the Ottoman government held memorial services in his honor.

== See also ==
- History of the Jews in Turkey
