= Bankalar Caddesi =

Street in Istanbul, Turkey (also known as the financial centre of the Ottoman Empire)

Coordinates: 41°01′26″N 28°58′25″E

- Interactive map of Bankalar Caddesi
- Location: Turkey

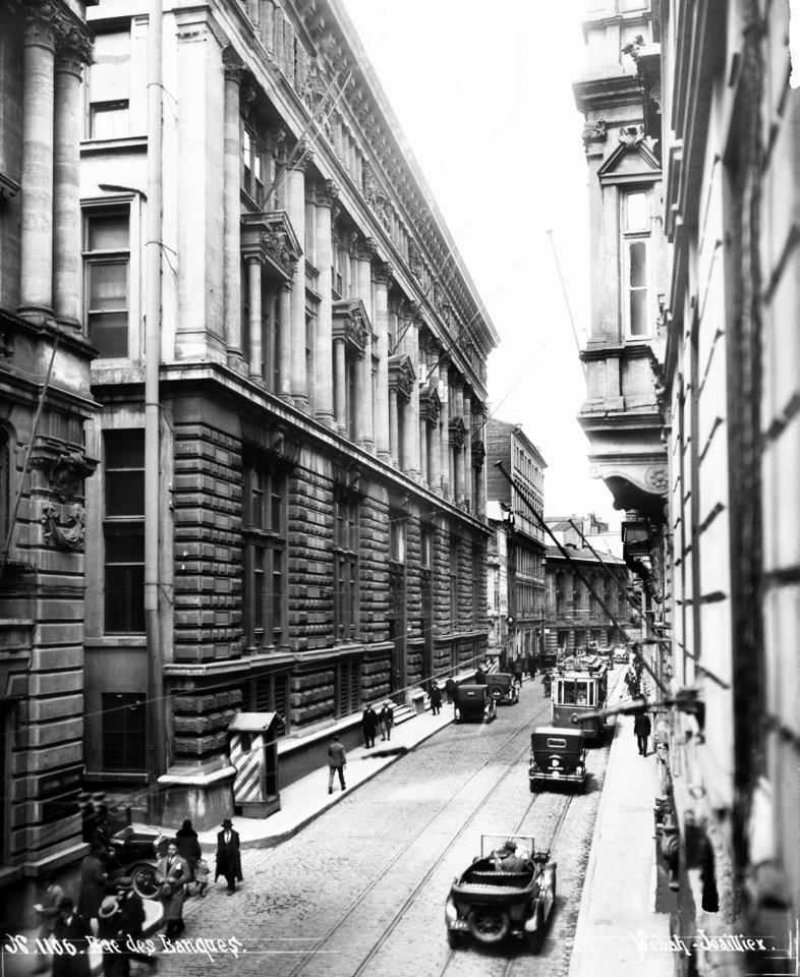
Bankalar Caddesi (c. late 1920s) by Sébah & Joaillier. The Ottoman Bank building (1892) is seen at left.

Bankalar Caddesi (Banks Street), also known as Voyvoda Caddesi (Voivode Street), in the historic Galata quarter (present-day Karaköy) of the Beyoğlu (Pera) district in Istanbul, Turkey, was the financial centre of the late Ottoman Empire. It strikes out west from busy Kemeraltı Caddesi in Karaköy and segues into Okçu Musa Caddesi which leads up to Şişhane and Tepebaşı in Beyoğlu.

Although most of the grand 19th-century buildings that line both sides of the street have survived into the 21st century, they are increasingly being converted into hotels, restaurants and cultural centres.

The southern stop of Tünel (1875), the world's second oldest subterranean railway line after London's Underground (1863), is just minutes' walk away from the eastern end of Bankalar Caddesi. The Karaköy tram stop on the T1 line is also very close to the start of the street.

== History ==
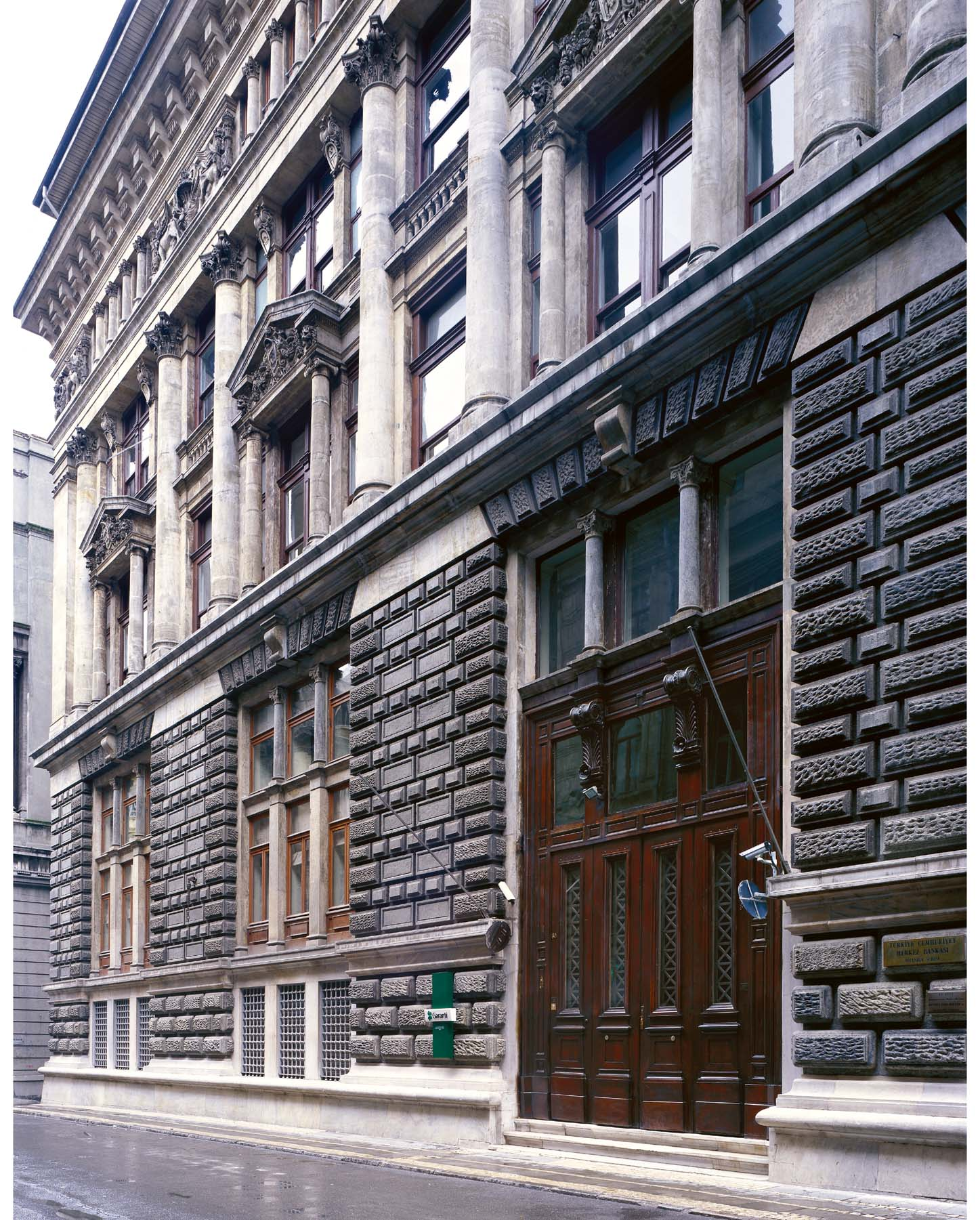
The Ottoman Bank Archives and Research Centre, former head office of the Ottoman Bank, Constantinople.

The street's name is written as Voyvoda Yolu (Voivode Road) in the 17th-century Seyahatnâme of Ottoman Turkish traveller Evliya Çelebi.

During the late Ottoman period, the most important banks, financial institutions and insurance companies had their headquarters here.

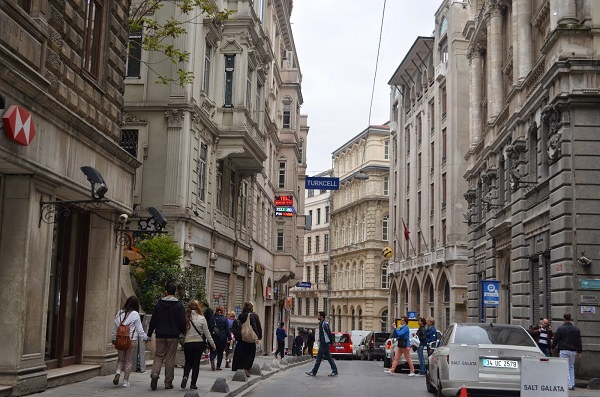
Bankalar Caddesi in 2016

These institutions included the Ottoman Central Bank (originally established as the Bank-ı Osmanî in 1856, and later reorganised as the Bank-ı Osmanî-i Şahane in 1863) and the Ottoman Stock Exchange (originally established in 1866, it was formally renamed Dersaadet Securities Exchange (Turkish: Dersaadet Tahvilat Borsası) in 1873.)

Bankalar Caddesi continued to serve as Istanbul's main financial district until the 1990s, when Turkish banks began moving their headquarters to the modern central business districts of Levent and Maslak. In the final decades of the 20th century, the Istanbul Stock Exchange moved first to the 4th Vakıf Han building in Sirkeci, and then in 1995 to its current building in İstinye.

== Attractions ==
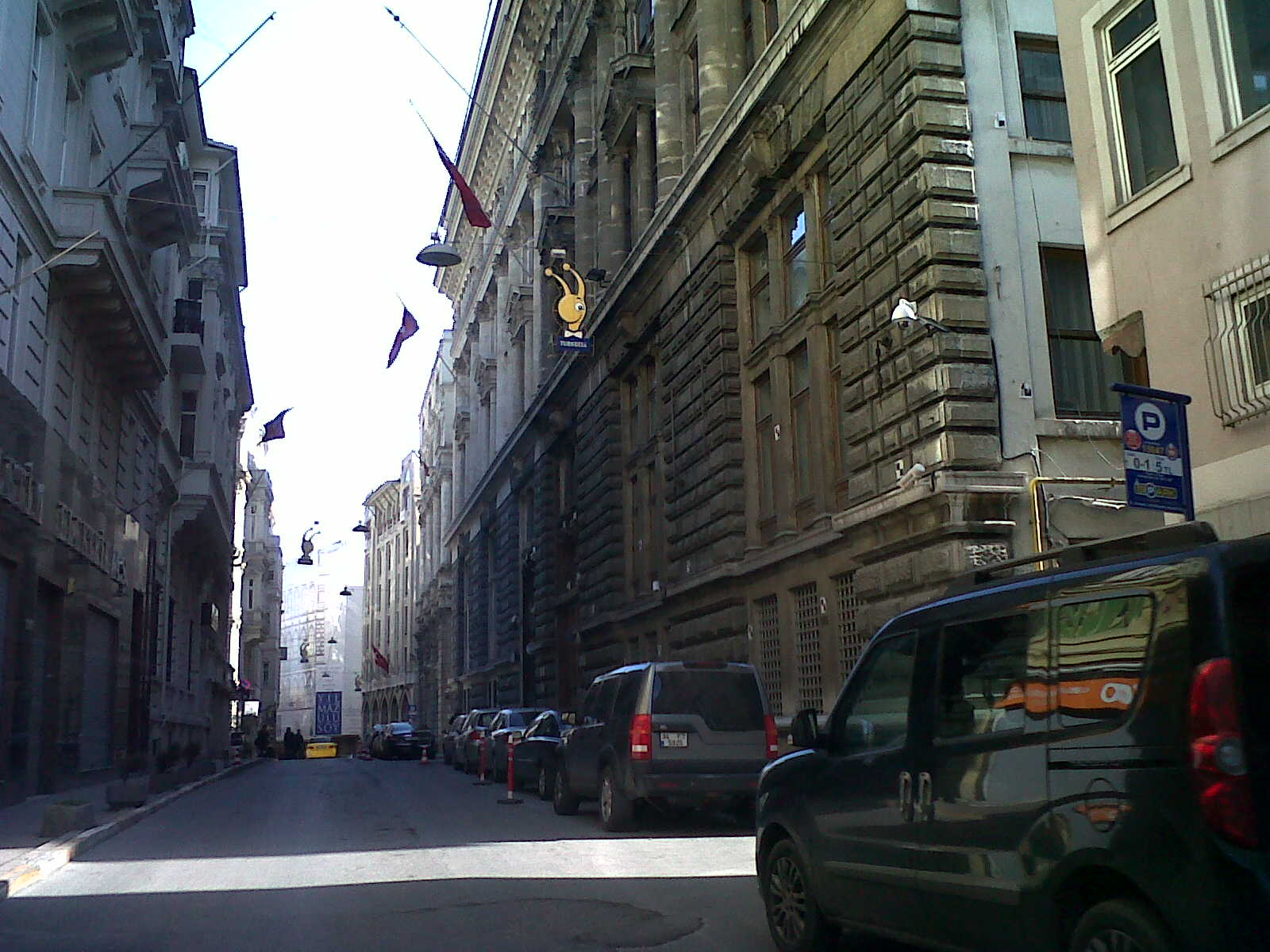
Bankalar Caddesi was Istanbul's financial centre during the Ottoman period. Completed in 1892, the Ottoman Bank headquarters is seen at right.

The Alexandre Vallaury-designed building that once housed the Imperial Ottoman Bank now belongs to Garanti BBVA and houses the Ottoman Bank Museum and SALT Galata which safeguards the archives of the bank and makes them available for research.

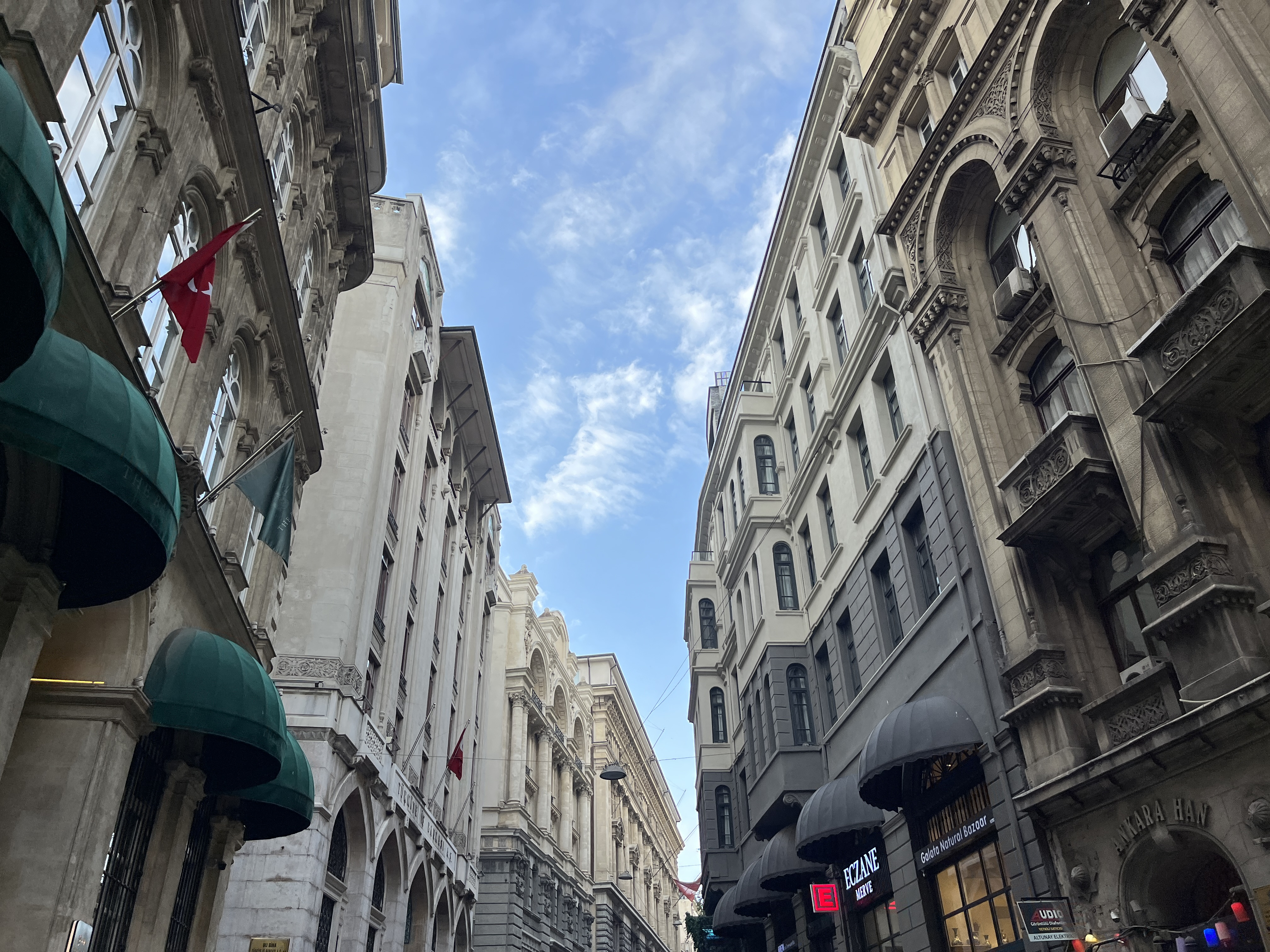
Bankalar Caddesi in 2023

The Camondo Stairs, a curvaceous staircase designed in a unique mix of the Neo-Baroque and early Art Nouveau styles, and built circa 1870–1880 by the renowned Ottoman-Venetian Jewish banker Abraham Salomon Camondo, links Bankalar Caddesi with Kart Çınar Sokak. The stairs were famously photographed by Henri Cartier-Bresson in 1964, and have featured in Barbara Nadel's crime novel Pretty Dead Things.

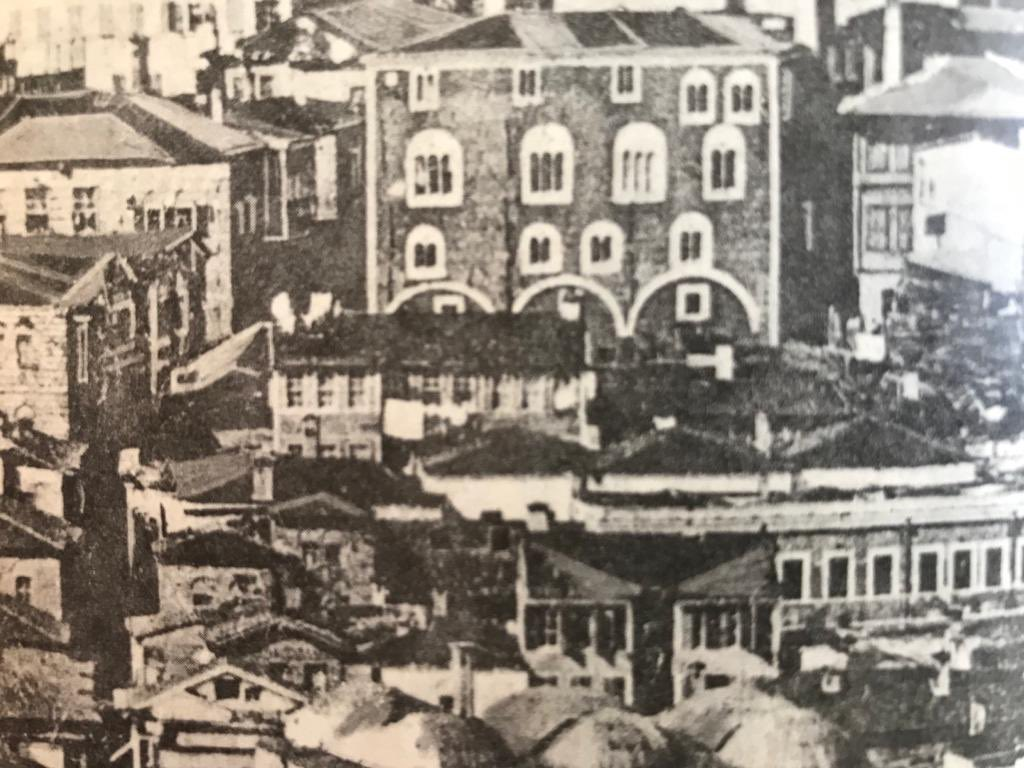
Genoese Palace (1314) before its front facade on Bankalar Caddesi was rebuilt with a different style in the 1880s and became known as the Bereket Han office building.

At the top of the Camondo Stairs, on Kart Çınar Sokak, the street running parallel with Bankalar Caddesi, are a couple of reminders of the period in the 14th century when this part of Beyoğlu was governed by the Genoese. The most important is the battered relic of the historic Genoese Palazzo del Comune (1314), built by Montano De Marini, the Podestà of Galata, and modeled after the 13th century wing of the Palazzo San Giorgio in Genoa, Italy. It is a short walk to the left (west) of the Camondo Stairs, along the street that was once known as Rue Camondo in the 19th and early 20th centuries, and is currently named Kart Çınar Sokak. In 2022 the building was put up for sale after years of neglect.

Most of the buildings along Bankalar Caddesi have magnificent 19th-century facades that are being speedily renovated in the service of tourism at the start of the 21st century. The most comprehensive survey of these buildings was carried out for an exhibition in 2000 and the information was published in a richly illustrated book called Bankalar Caddesi: Voyvoda Street from Ottoman Times to Today, edited by historian Edhem Eldem.

== Gallery ==
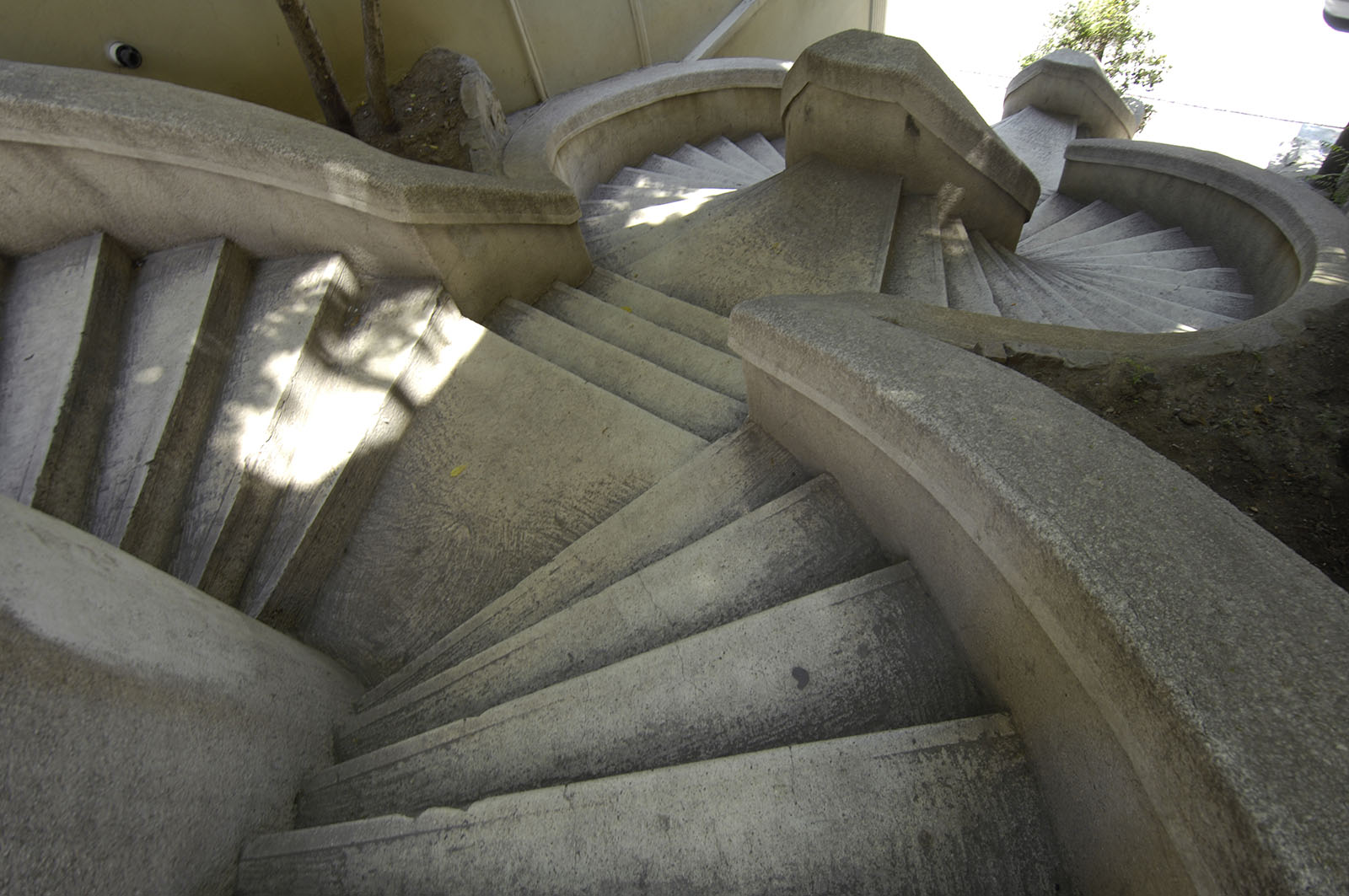
Camondo Stairs at Bankalar Caddesi

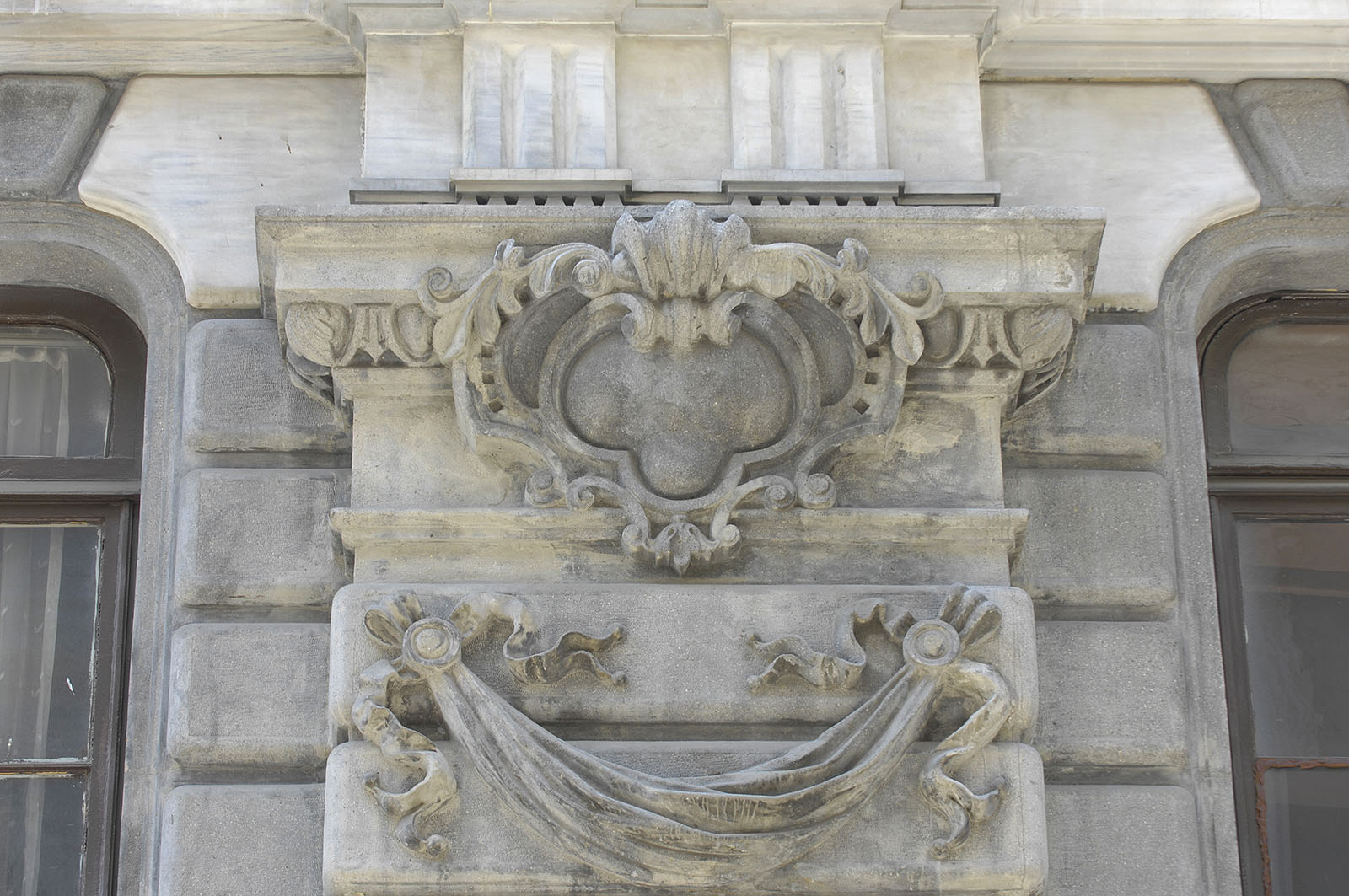
Bankalar Caddesi, detail at No. 9 (Assicurazioni Generali Office Building)

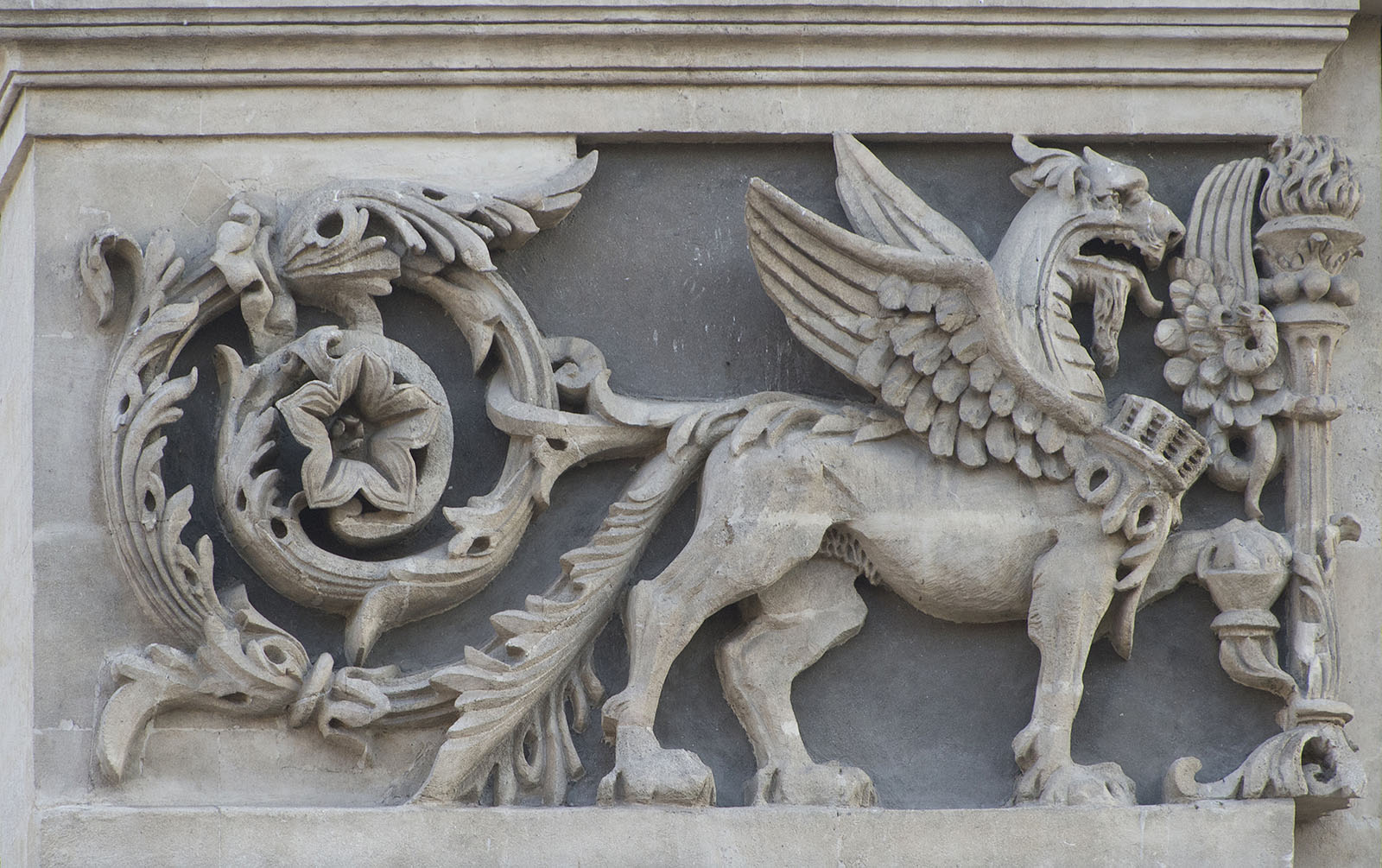
Bankalar Caddesi, detail at No. 11 (Ottoman Central Bank Building)

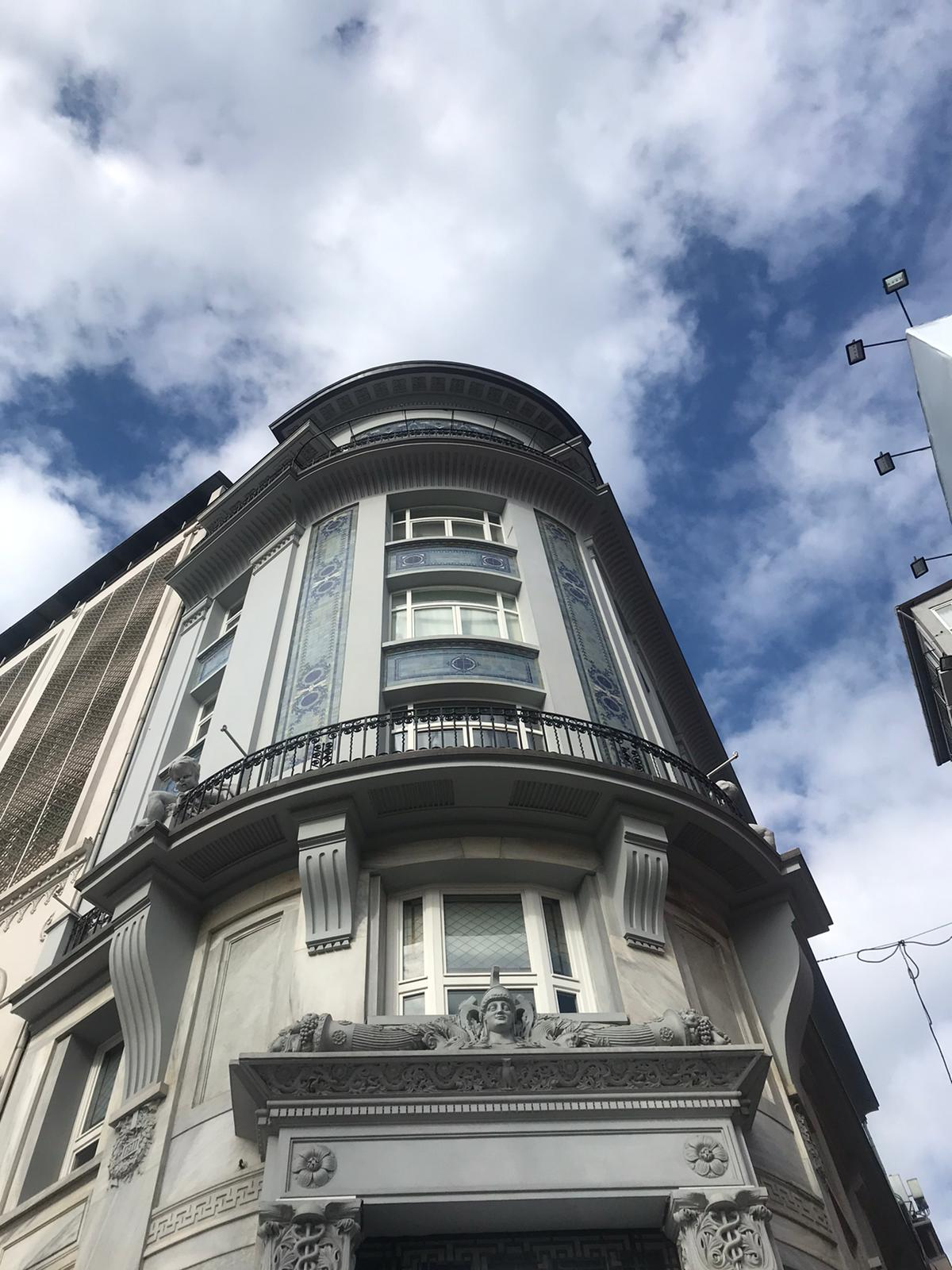
Minerva Office Building at the entrance of Bankalar Caddesi
