= Musée Nissim de Camondo =

Museum in Paris, France

Coordinates: 48°52′44″N 2°18′46″E

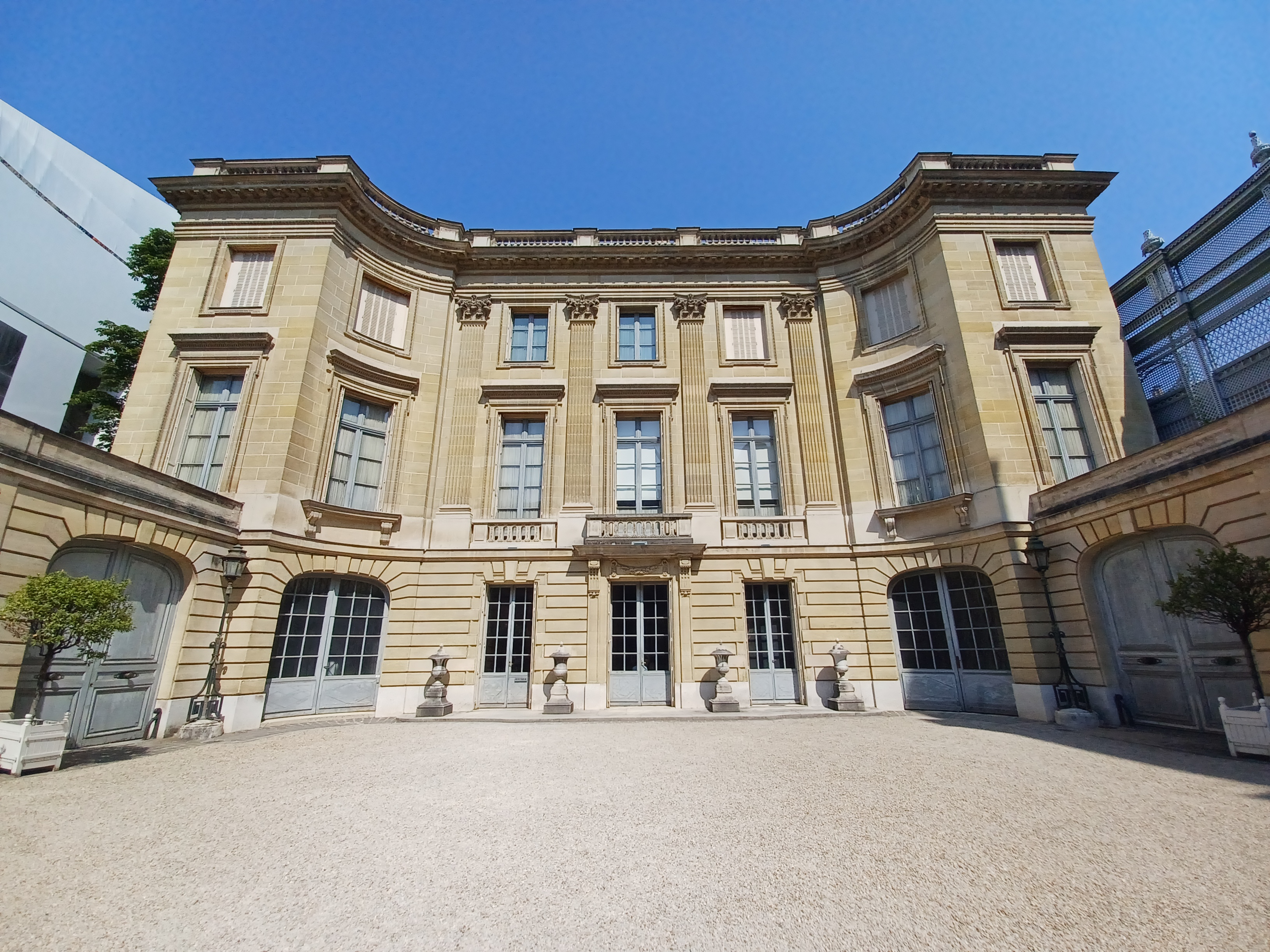
Musée Nissim de Camondo in 2023

The Musée Nissim de Camondo is a historic house museum of French decorative arts located in the Hôtel Moïse de Camondo at 63, rue de Monceau, on the edge of Parc Monceau in the 8th arrondissement of Paris, France.

The museum houses "a spectacular collection of French decorative art from the second half of the 18th century. ... Aubusson tapestries, canvases by Élisabeth Vigée-Lebrun or items that once belonged to Marie-Antoinette. Also on display, a collection of Sèvres porcelain and furniture by cabinetmakers Riesener and Oeben".

== History ==
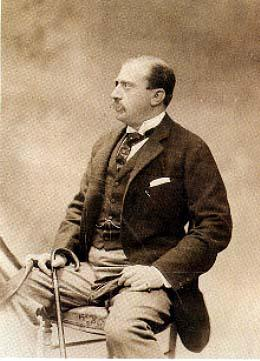
Count Moïse de Camondo

The mansion was built from 1911 to 1914 for Count Moïse de Camondo, a French banker and member of the Sephardic Jewish Camondo family, to display his collection of eighteenth-century French furniture and art objects.

It was designed by the architect René Sergent and patterned on the Petit Trianon at Versailles, but with modern conveniences. Moïse de Camondo died in 1935 and bequeathed the house and its collections to Les Arts Décoratifs in honour of his son, Nissim de Camondo, who had been killed in action during World War I.

A few years later when Moïse's daughter and her family were deported to Auschwitz: Béatrice de Camondo, her ex-husband Léon Reinach, and their two children (Fanny and Bertrand) were all murdered there. Moïse's widow Irène survived the Holocaust by escaping to a villa in the south of France. Living members of the Camondo family are descendants of Isaac Camondo, the founder of the bank.

== Museum ==
The house opened as a museum in 1936, and is maintained in its original condition as if it were still a private home. Three floors are open to visitors: the lower ground floor (kitchens), upper ground floor (formal rooms), first floor (private apartments), and gardens. Outbuildings are also included. They were built in 1863, enlarged by Count Nissim Camondo, and later modified by his son, Moïse.

The house's furnishings include needlepoint chairs and work by artisans of the Garde-Meuble de la Couronne (Royal Furniture Repository), such as Jean-François Oeben, Jean Henri Riesener, and Georges Jacob. Floors are furnished with Savonnerie carpets woven in 1678 for the Grande Galerie in the Louvre.

The walls are accented with tapestries (many Beauvais or Aubusson) and paintings, including portraits by Élisabeth-Louise Vigée Le Brun, landscapes by Guardi and Hubert Robert, and hunting scenes by Jean-Baptiste Oudry. Table settings are of particular interest, especially the Orloff silver dinner service commissioned by Catherine II of Russia from silversmith Jacques-Nicolas Roettiers in 1770, and the Buffon porcelain services made at Sèvres in the 1780s with a bird theme. Other notable objects include a bust by Jean-Antoine Houdon, bas-reliefs, Chinese vases, and crystal chandeliers.

=== Visiting ===
The museum closed in February 2020 due to the COVID-19 pandemic. It closed again for renovations in August 2024. Reopening is announced for the beginning of 2030.

The nearest Paris Métro stops are Villiers and Monceau on Line 2.

== In popular media ==
The house was the location for filming some scenes for Lupin (TV series), standing in for the home of the fictional, wealthy Pellegrini family. Locations included in the television series include the "grounds outside the house, inside the house, and also on the roof".

== Gallery ==
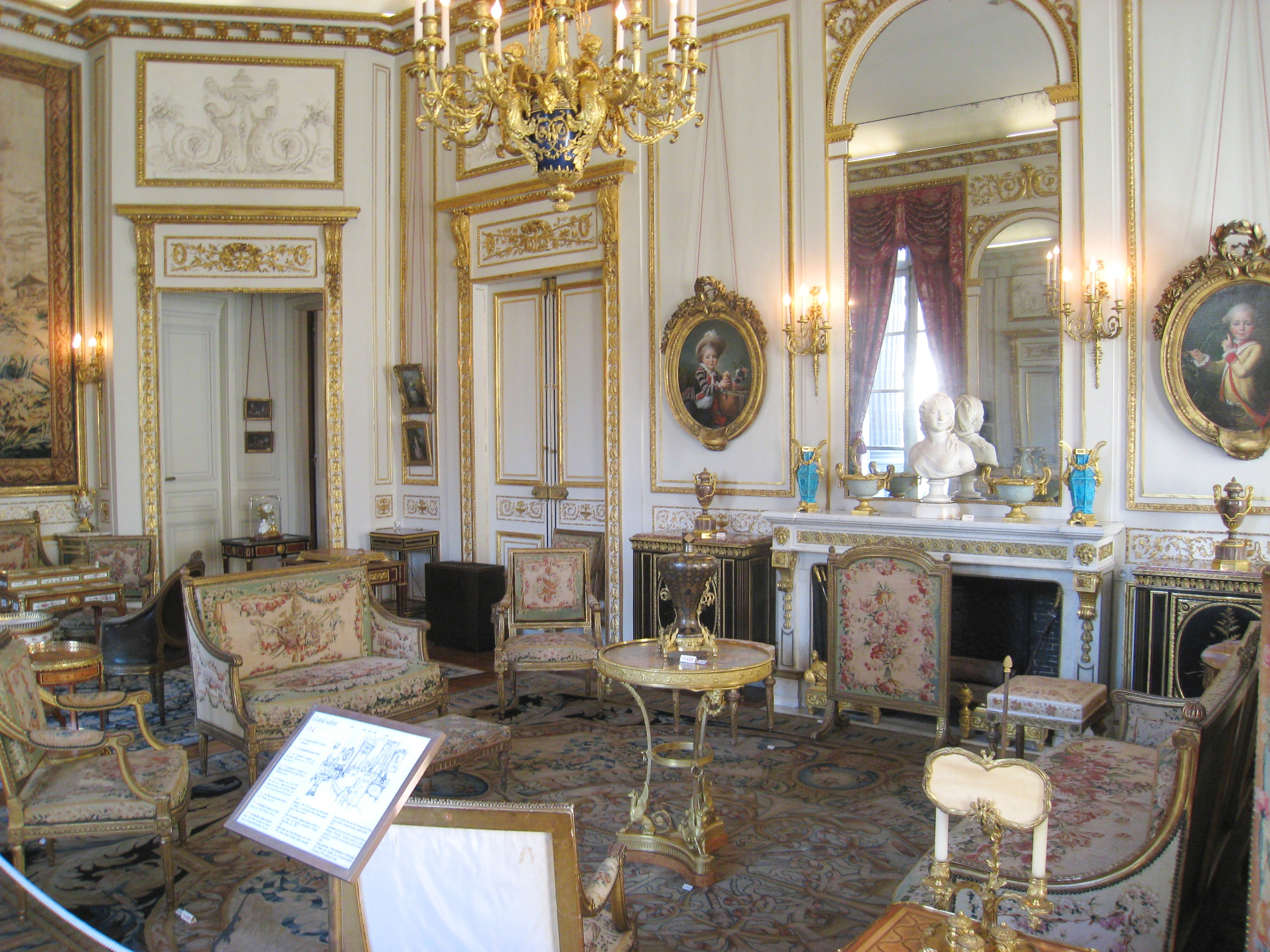
Grand Salon

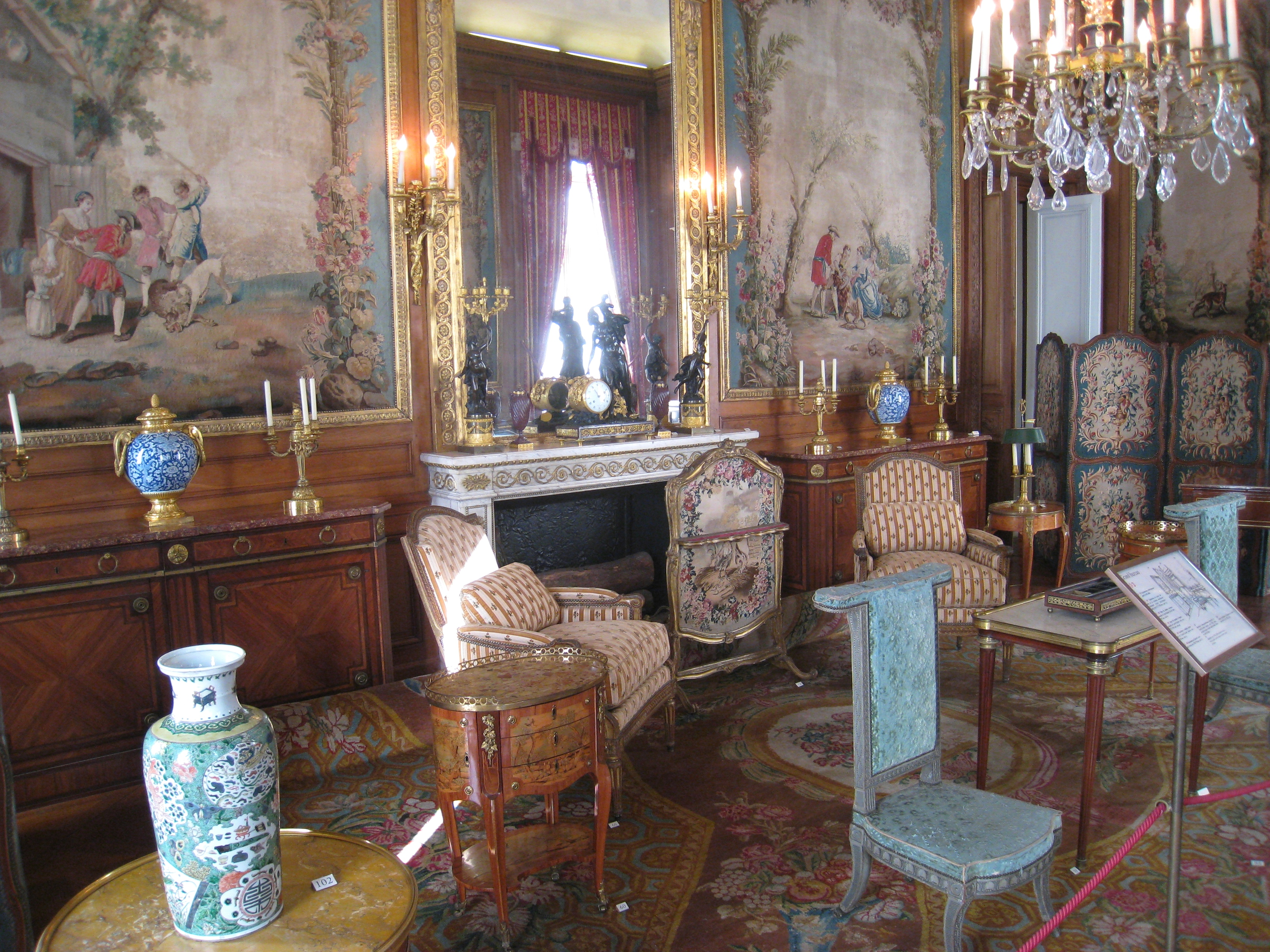
Grand Bureau

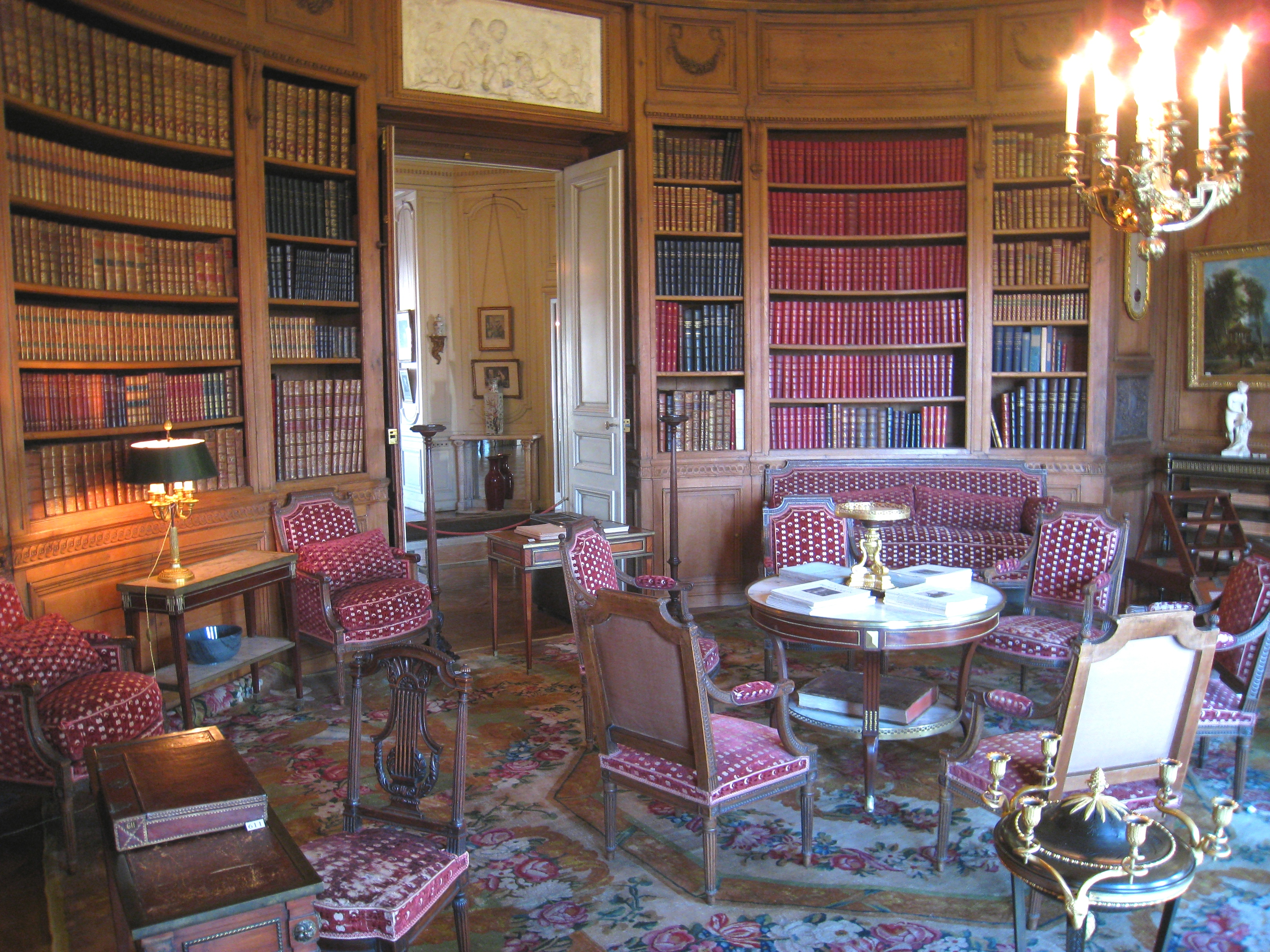
Library

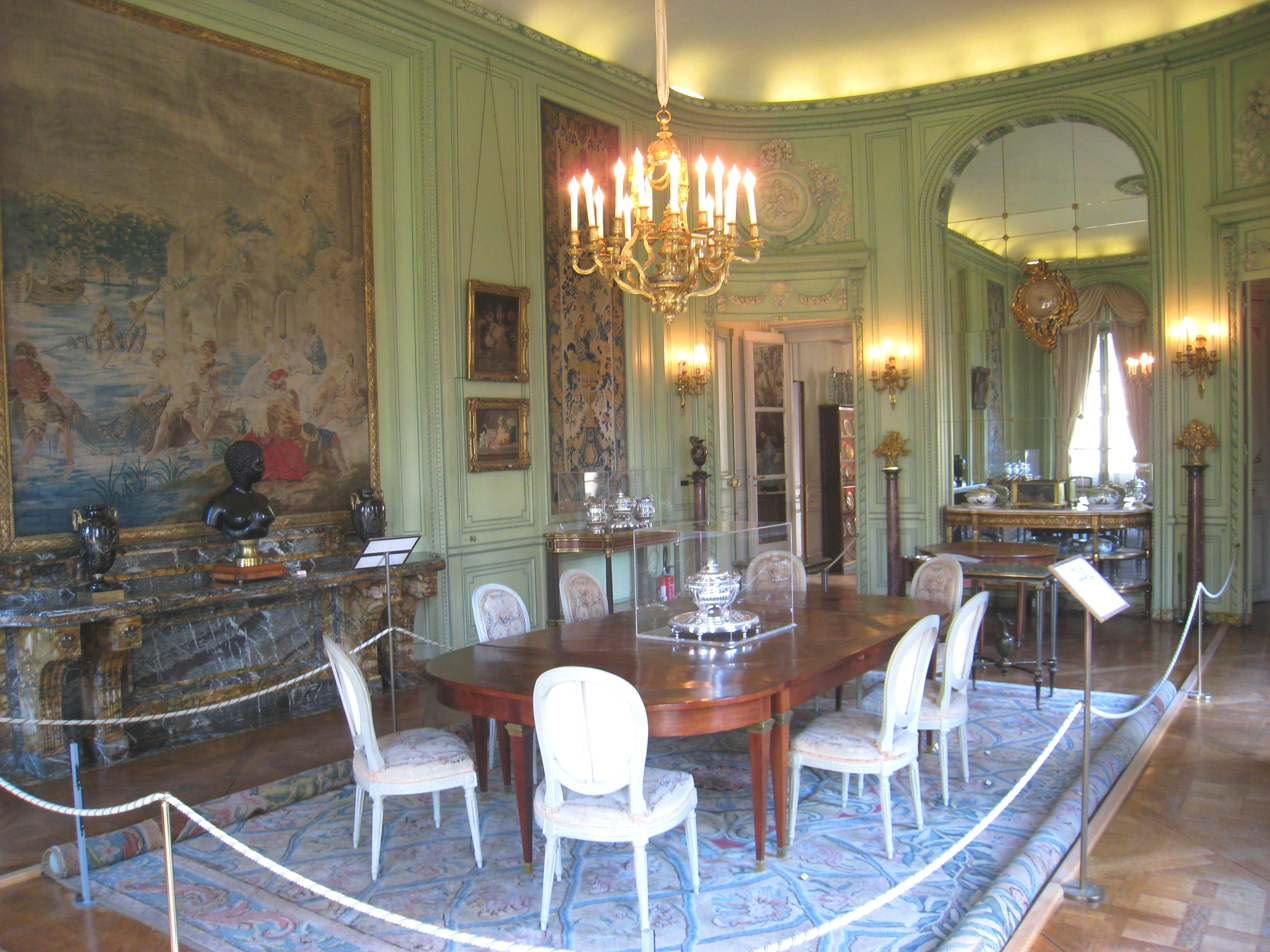
Dining Room

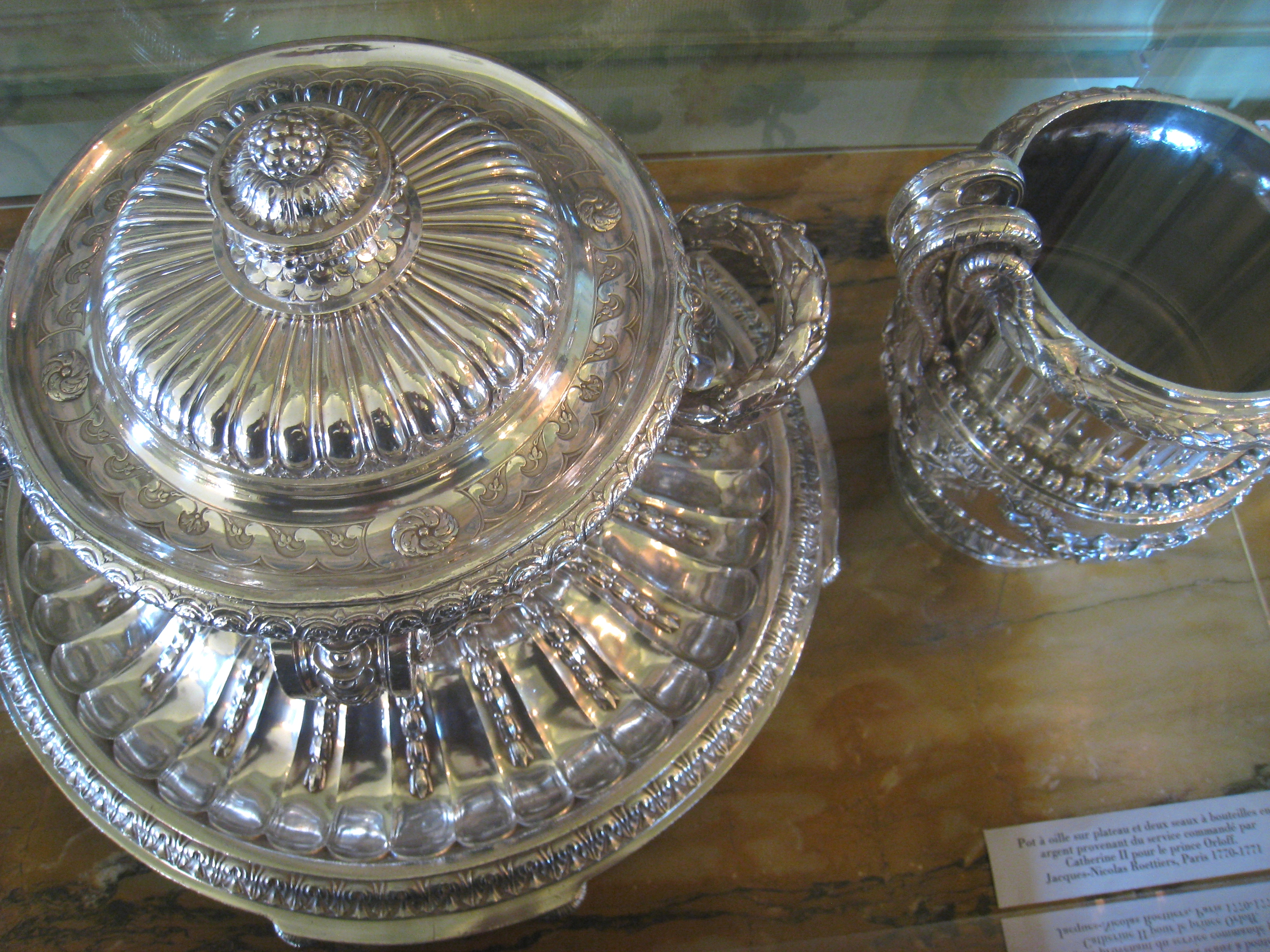
Silver service

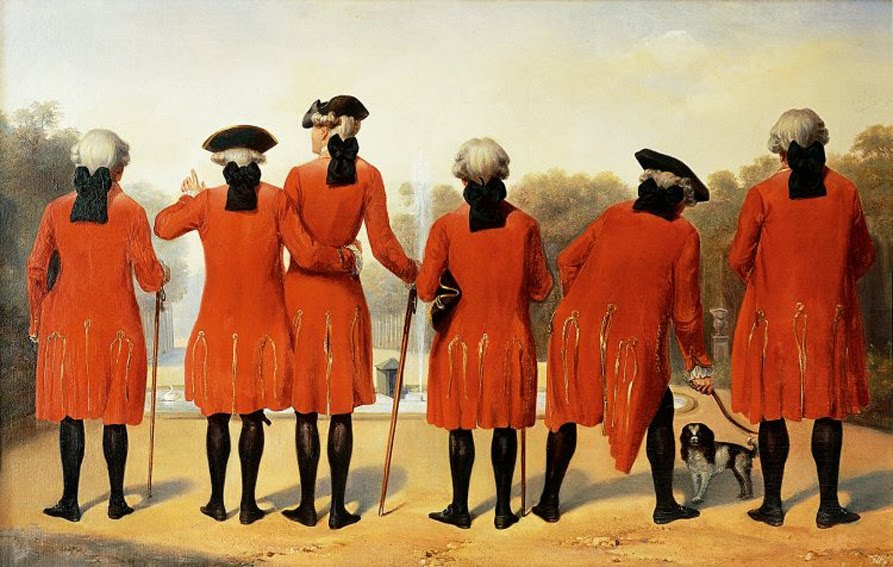
Les Gentilshommes du Duc d'Orléans

== See also ==
- List of museums in Paris
