= René Sergent =

French architect

René Sergent (French pronunciation: [ʁəne sɛʁʒɑ̃]; July 4, 1865 - August 22, 1927) was a French architect.

== Biography ==
Born in Clichy, Sergent was trained at the École spéciale d'architecture, where he concentrated on French architecture of the 18th century but also studied British contemporaries such as Robert Adam, then entered the architectural office of Ernest Sanson where he remained for more than fifteen years.

Sergent opened his own practice in 1902, where he undertook design or restoration for a number of wealthy and aristocratic clients including Henri de La Tour d'Auvergne-Lauraguais, the Comtesse de Maupeou, Comte Edmond de Fels, Comte Moïse de Camondo, Duveen, Seligmann, Fabre-Luce, Rothschild, and Wendel. As his reputation spread, he was also asked to design buildings in the United States and Argentina for clients including Pierpont Morgan, Gould, Vanderbilt, Bosch, Alvear, and Errázuriz. His buildings were noted for their integration of modern comforts and conveniences into an imposing classical style.

He also performed work on landmark hotels, including the Trianon Palace at Versailles (1910), the Savoy Hotel and Claridge's in London, the Rome Grand Hotel (today the St. Regis Rome), and the Hotel Stéphanie at Baden-Baden. In addition, he designed the headquarters for the Rolls-Royce Limited, a Parisian store for the Duveen brothers (1907–1908) in the form of a Petit Trianon at the rear of a marble courtyard at n° 20 place Vendôme which is now a bank headquarters, and the Duveen Gallery, a large building in the style of Ange-Jacques Gabriel at the corner of 5th Avenue and 56th street in New York City (1910, demolished 1953).

Sergent received among other awards the Prix Deschaumes in 1889 and the grande médaille de l'architecture privée from the Société centrale des architectes. He died in 1927 at Congis-sur-Thérouanne.

== Selected works ==
- 1890 : Mansion, Gaberret, Landes, dismantled in 1987.
- 1894 : Mansion, 9 rue Léo-Delibes, Paris, neo-gothic and neo-renaissance style.
- 1903-1906 : Château de Voisins at Saint-Hilarion (Yvelines) for Comte Edmond de Fels. Spectacular château inspired by Ange-Jacques Gabriel, particularly the École militaire in Paris.
- 1910 : Hôtel Trianon Palace, Versailles
- 1910 : Mansion, 9 avenue Charles Floquet, Paris, for Jules Steinbach, neo-classical style.
- 1911 : Mansion, 63 rue de Monceau, Paris, for Comte Moïse de Camondo (1860–1935), today the Musée Nissim de Camondo. Inspired by the Petit Trianon at Versailles.
- 1911 : Palais Bosch, Buenos Aires, for Ernesto Bosch, today the American Embassy.
- 1911 : Palais Errazúriz, Buenos Aires, for Matías Errazúriz, today the National Museum of Decorative Arts.
- 1911 : Mansion Alvear, Buenos Aires, for María Unzue de Alvear.
- 1913 : Mansion, 19 avenue d'Iéna, Paris, for Alfred Heidelbach, neo-classical style, today the Panthéon Bouddhique of the Musée Guimet.
- 1914 : Palais Sans Souci, Victoria, Argentina, for Marcelo Torcuato de Alvear.
- 1914 : Mansion, Buenos Aires, for the Atucha family.
- 1914 : Mansion, Buenos Aires, for the Saturnino J. Unzué family.
- 1922 : Asilo Luis María Saavedra, Buenos Aires, for Mme. Alvear de Bosch.
- Château d'Artigny, near Tours, for perfumer François Coty.
- Château de Voormezeele (Belgium), in the style of Louis XIV (destroyed).
- Mansion, on the Champ de Mars, Paris, for Jean-Philippe Worth, neo-classical style.

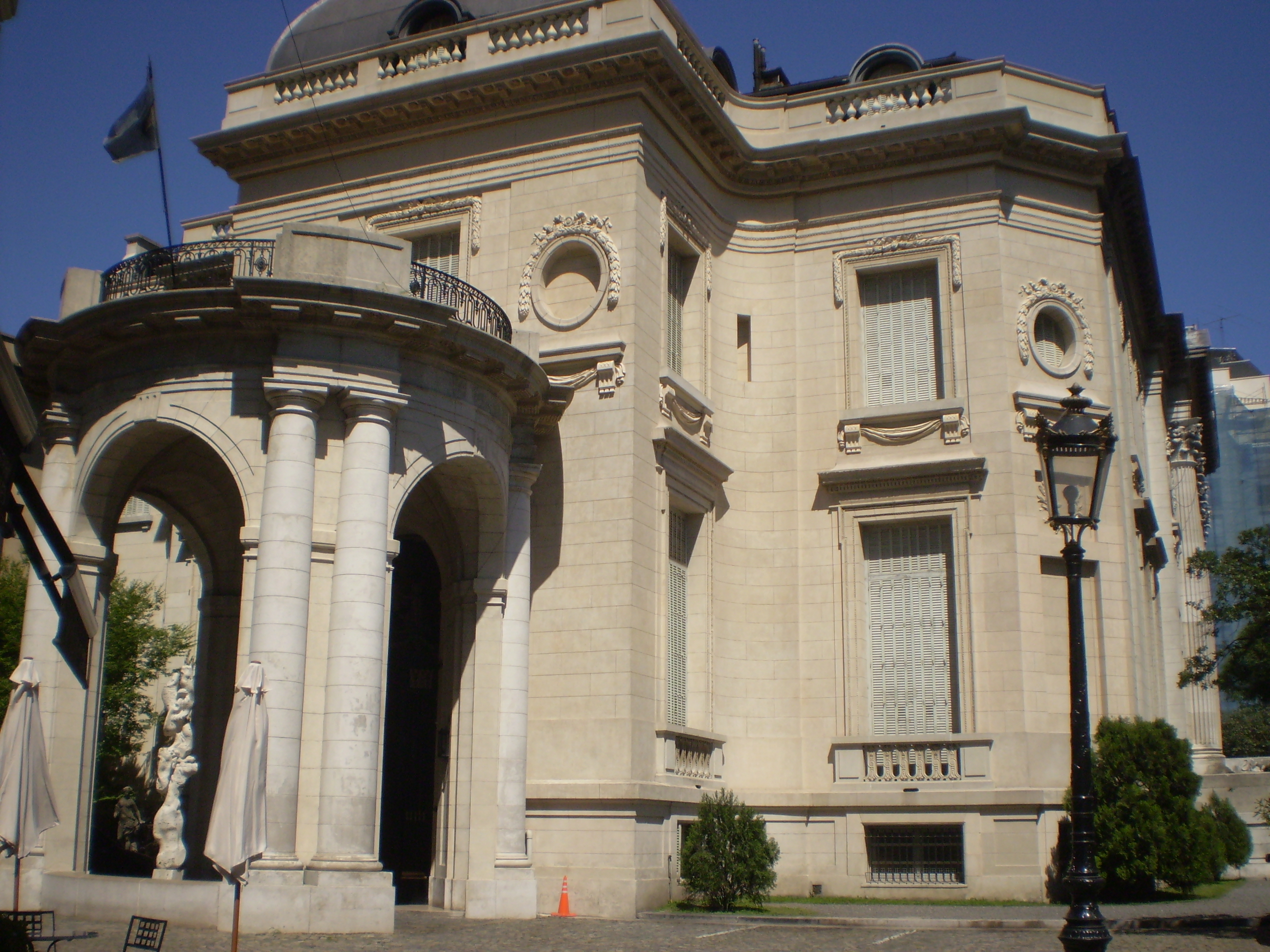
Errazúriz Palace (Argentina)

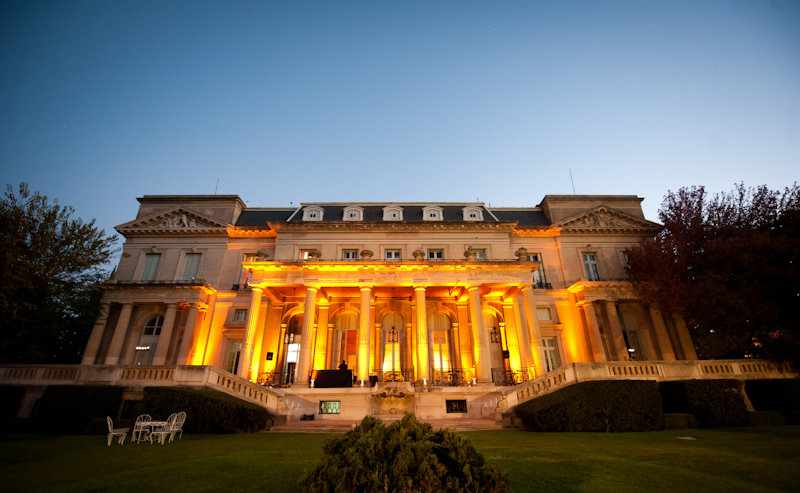
Sans-Souci Palace (Argentina)

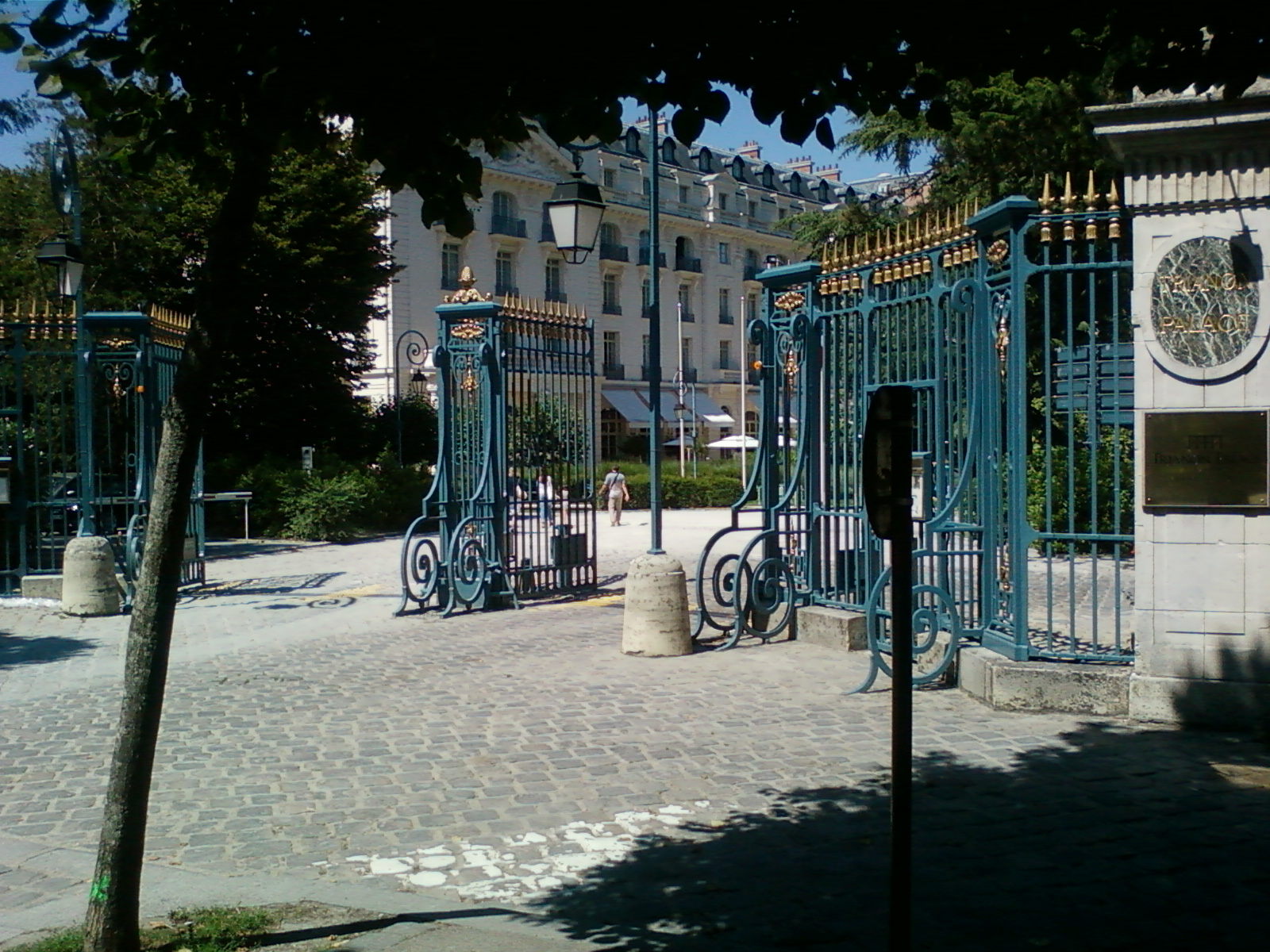
Hotel Trianon Palace (France)
