= Béatrice Reinach =

Jewish-French aristocrat

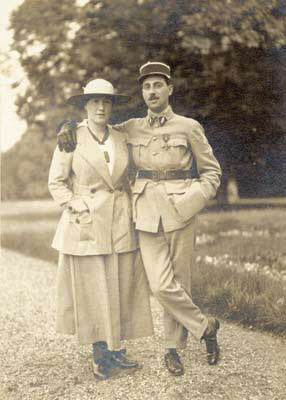
Béatrice in 1916 with her brother Nissim de Camondo, who was killed in action on 5 Sept 1917

Louise Béatrice Reinach (9 July 1894–1945) was a French socialite and a Holocaust victim.

== Biography ==
Born into the wealthy Camondo family in the 16th arrondissement of Paris, she was the daughter of Count Moïse de Camondo and Irène Cahen d'Anvers, both of whom were from prominent Jewish banking families. One of two children, her older brother Nissim served as a fighter pilot during World War I and was killed in action in 1917.

In 1918, Béatrice de Camondo married composer Léon Reinach (1893–1943), the son of Théodore Reinach. They had two children:

1. Fanny (born 26 July 1920 in Paris, murdered in 1943 at Auschwitz)
2. Bertrand (born 1 July 1923 in Paris, murdered in 1943 at Auschwitz)

On her father's death in 1935, Béatrice inherited a large fortune. Her father bequeathed his Parisian home, including its contents and a major collection of art, to the Musée des Arts Décoratifs to be used to create the Musée Nissim de Camondo in his son's honor. She was a member of the Automobile Club féminin de France.

A convert to Catholicism, Béatrice felt safe in Paris after the Nazi occupation. Divorced from her Jewish husband Léon Reinach, she believed that her wealth and the influential people she rode horses with in the Parc Monceau would shield her from being taken. In the Musée Nissim de Camondo, on the top floor, there is a letter from her ex-husband telling Béatrice to leave Paris with their son and daughter. However, she disregarded his advice.

In 1943, under the German occupation of France during World War II, Béatrice, her ex-husband and their two children were forcibly removed from Paris and taken to the Drancy deportation camp north of the city. From there, they were subsequently deported to Auschwitz concentration camp, where they all were murdered. Her aunt, Elisabeth Cahen d'Anvers (1874–1944), who had also divorced and converted to Catholicism was also imprisoned at Drancy deportation camp and died at KZ Auschwitz.
