= Léon Reinach =

French composer (1893–1944)

Léon Reinach (French pronunciation: [ʁɛ.nak], May 24, 1893 – May 12, 1944) was a French composer and art collector who was murdered in the Holocaust.

== Early life ==
Léon Reinach was born in 1893 into the Reinach family, numbering many statesmen and scientists among its members: his uncle Joseph had been Gambetta's cabinet director, a member of parliament and a Dreyfus supporter; his uncle Salomon, a graduate of the Ecole Normale Supérieure, a historian of art and religion and a prolific author, was a Hellenist, as was his father Théodore, a member of the Institut who built the Villa Kérylos in Beaulieu.

He married Béatrice de Camondo in March 1919. Their daughter Fanny was born in 1920, and they lived with her father-in-law at 63, rue de Monceau. When their son Bertrand was born in 1923, they moved to Boulevard Maurice Barrès in Neuilly.

Reinach was a musician, composer, and art collector. Included in his collection was Vincent Van Gogh's The Bridge at Chatou. Renoir painted the Portrait of Irène Cahen d'Anvers, his mother in law.

== Nazi occupation of France ==
When Nazi Germany occupied France in 1940, the Reinachs were persecuted because of their Jewish heritage. During the War, the couple separated. At the end of 1942, having crossed into the free zone, he moved to Pau. He was arrested while trying to escape to Spain. Interned at Drancy with Béatrice and her children, he was deported with Fanny and Bertrand on November 20, 1943 to Auschwitz on convoy 62, and was killed.

== See also ==
- The Holocaust in France
- Aryanization
- Antisemitism in France
- Emil Bührle
- Charles Ephrussi
