= Yeraltı Mosque =

Mosque in Beyoğlu, Istanbul, Turkey

Yeraltı Camii/Kurşunlu Mahzen
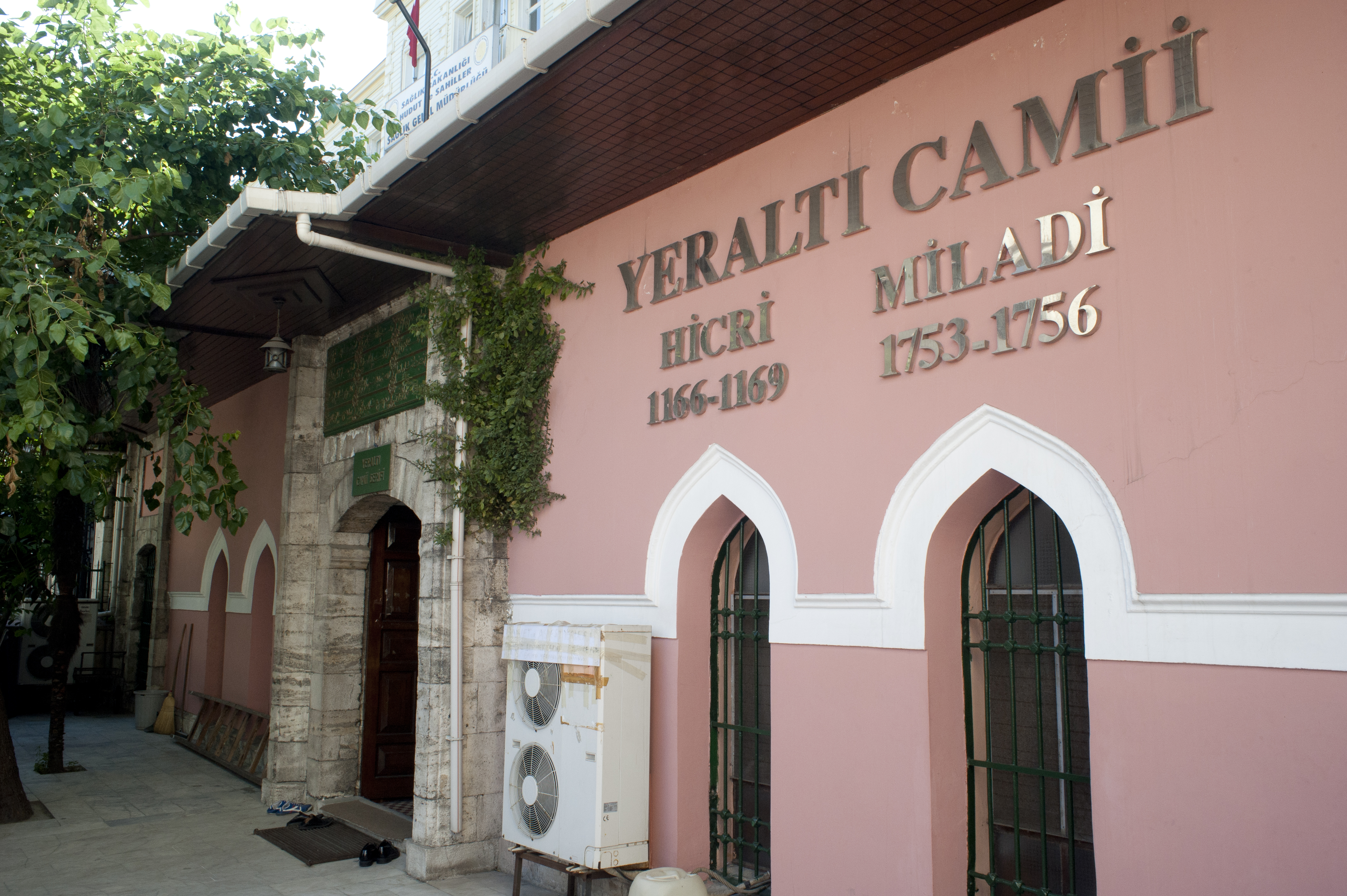
- The ground-level entrance to the mosque

- Location within Turkey

Religion
- Affiliation: Islam
- District: Beyoğlu
- Province: Istanbul Province

Location
- Location: Istanbul, Turkey
- Sector: Karaköy
- Coordinates: 41.0224628°N 28.9767023°E

Architecture
- Type: mosque
- Style: Ottoman architecture
- Completed: 1756
- Materials: stone, brick

The Yeraltı Mosque (Turkish: Yeraltı Camii, lit. 'Underground Mosque') is a mosque located in the Karaköy part of the Beyoğlu district in Istanbul, Turkey. The mosque's name is derived from the fact that its prayer hall and main features of it are all underground.

It is sometimes known as Kurşunlu Mahzen, as it was a place where the belongings of captured Umayyad warriors were sealed away with molten lead.

== History ==
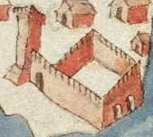
A sketch of the Byzantine fortress by Cristoforo Buondelmonti in the 1420s, before the conversion of its cellar into a mosque

The mosque was originally the basement cellar of a Byzantine fortress. After the conquest of Constantinople in 1453, this cellar was used as a storage for ammunition, as well as a water cistern. Then the Ottoman vizier, Köse Bahir Mustafa Pasha, converted the cellar into a mosque in 1753. Memorial cenotaphs for three holy men were added in the same year as well, at the request of a Naqshbandi dervish.

The 1754 Istanbul earthquake destroyed the structure, and so the Ottoman Sultan Mahmud I ordered it to be rebuilt. The mosque was thus completed in 1756. The minaret was later rebuilt as well, but it is nowhere to be seen in the present day.

== The tombs ==
Inside the mosque below ground floor, there are two rooms which contain tombs. These tombs are attributed to two Sahaba and one of the Tabi' al-Tabi'een. The Sahaba's tombs are located in one room. The tombs were added in 1753, after a Naqshbandi dervish claimed that the presence of tombs in the cellar was revealed to him in a dream.

=== Tomb of Amr ibn al-As and Wahb ibn Husayra ===
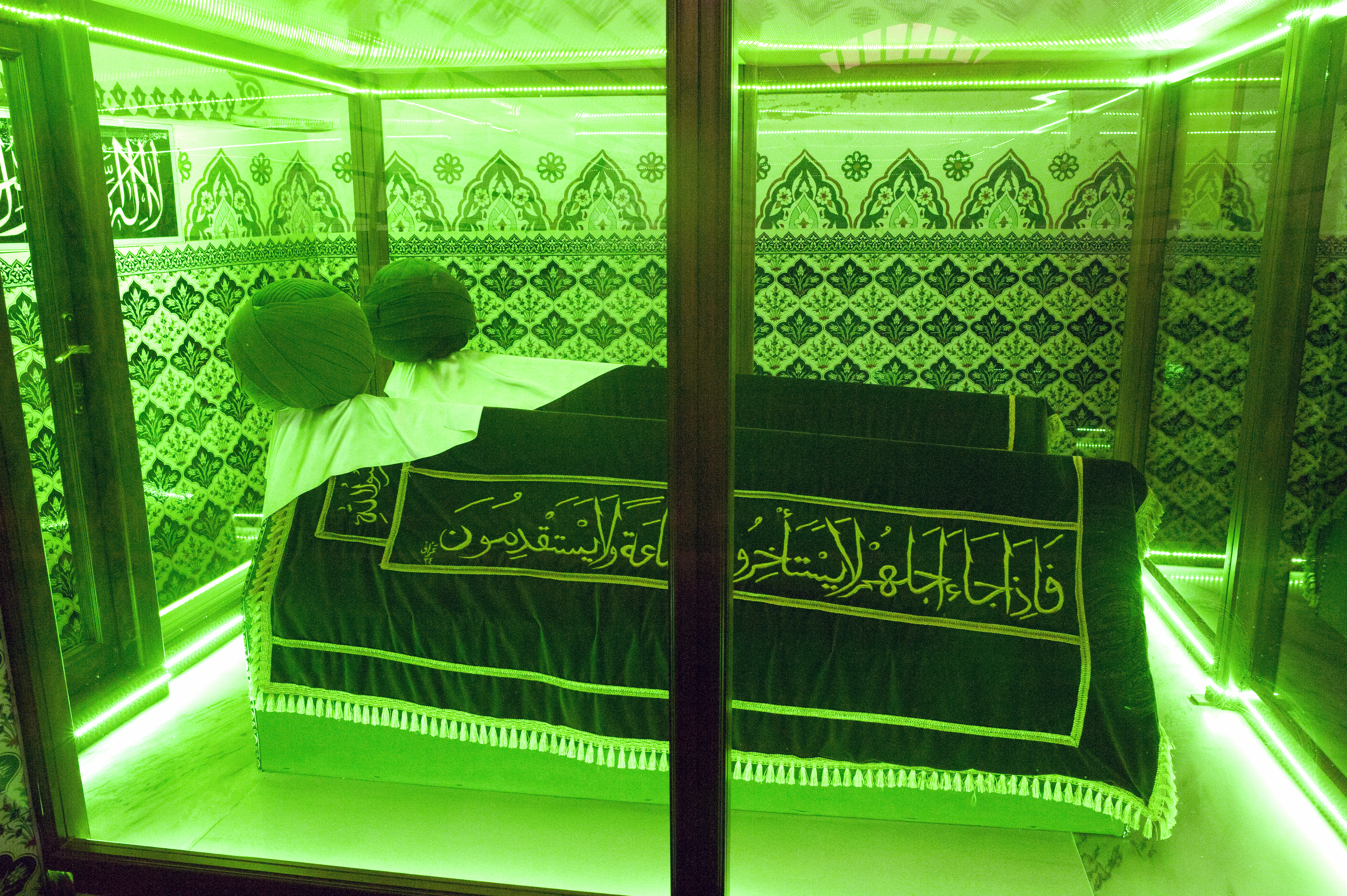
The wooden cenotaphs for Amr and Wahb

Entering the mosque from Karaköy leads to this room. It contains two wooden cenotaphs dedicated to Amr ibn al-As and another Sahaba named Wahb ibn Husayra. However, Amr ibn al-As is known to have died in Egypt, while there is little to no record of any Sahaba named "Wahb ibn Husayra" at all. Local traditions relate that these Sahaba were captured during an attempted invasion of Constantinople and tortured to death. The cenotaphs of these two Sahaba are enclosed by an iron grille which is inlaid with glass windows.

=== Tomb of Sufyan ibn Uyaynah ===
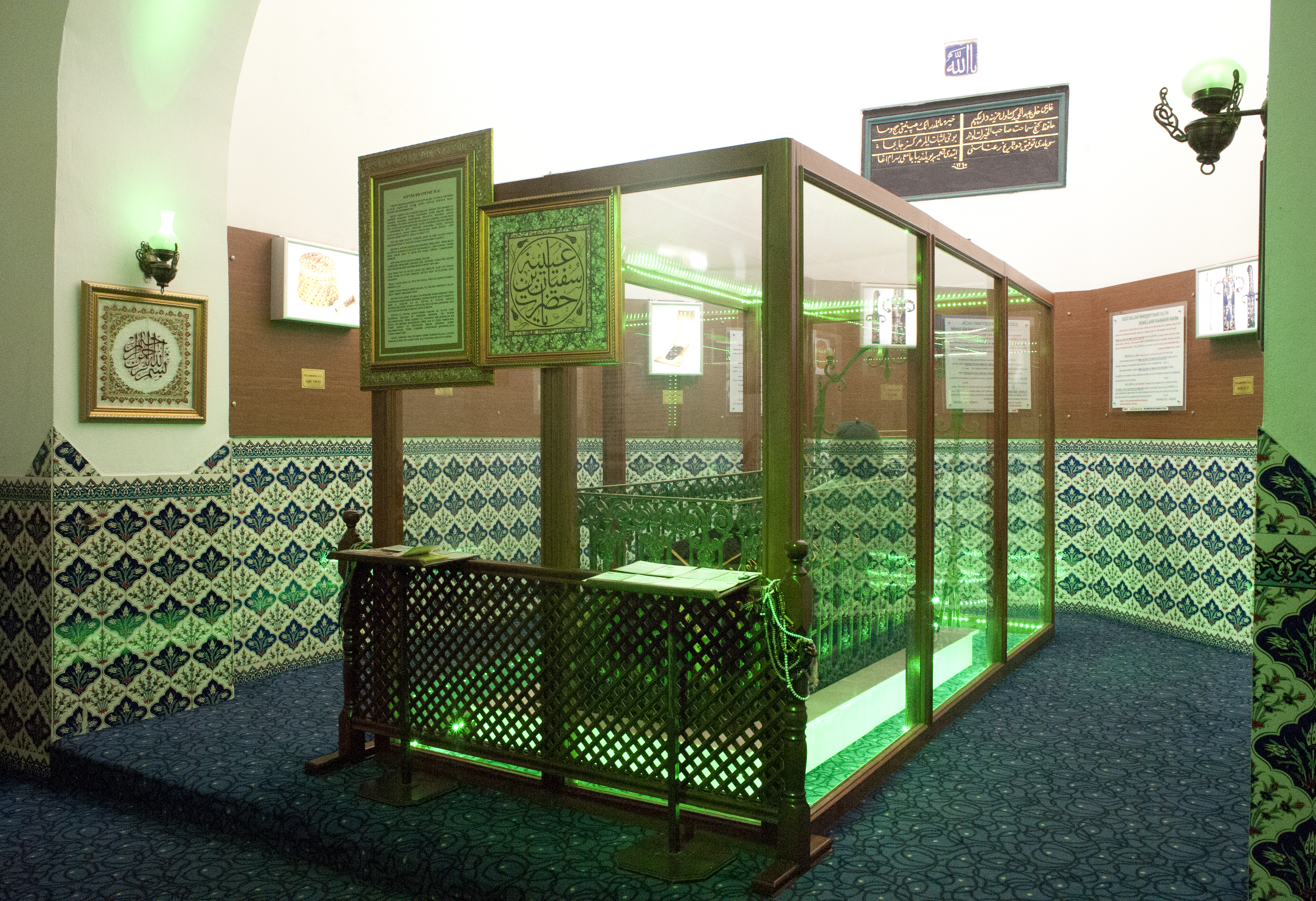
The cenotaph of Sufyan ibn Uyaynah in the mosque

Sufyan ibn Uyaynah was a prominent member of the Tabi' al-Tabi'een, and hence one of the Salaf. The room containing his cenotaph is located in the middle of the mosque and can be entered through a small doorway. The local traditions relate that he was a soldier fighting under Maslama ibn Abd al-Malik who was captured in battle and tortured to death. However, it is known that Sufyan ibn Uyaynah died in Mecca, Saudi Arabia.

== Gallery ==
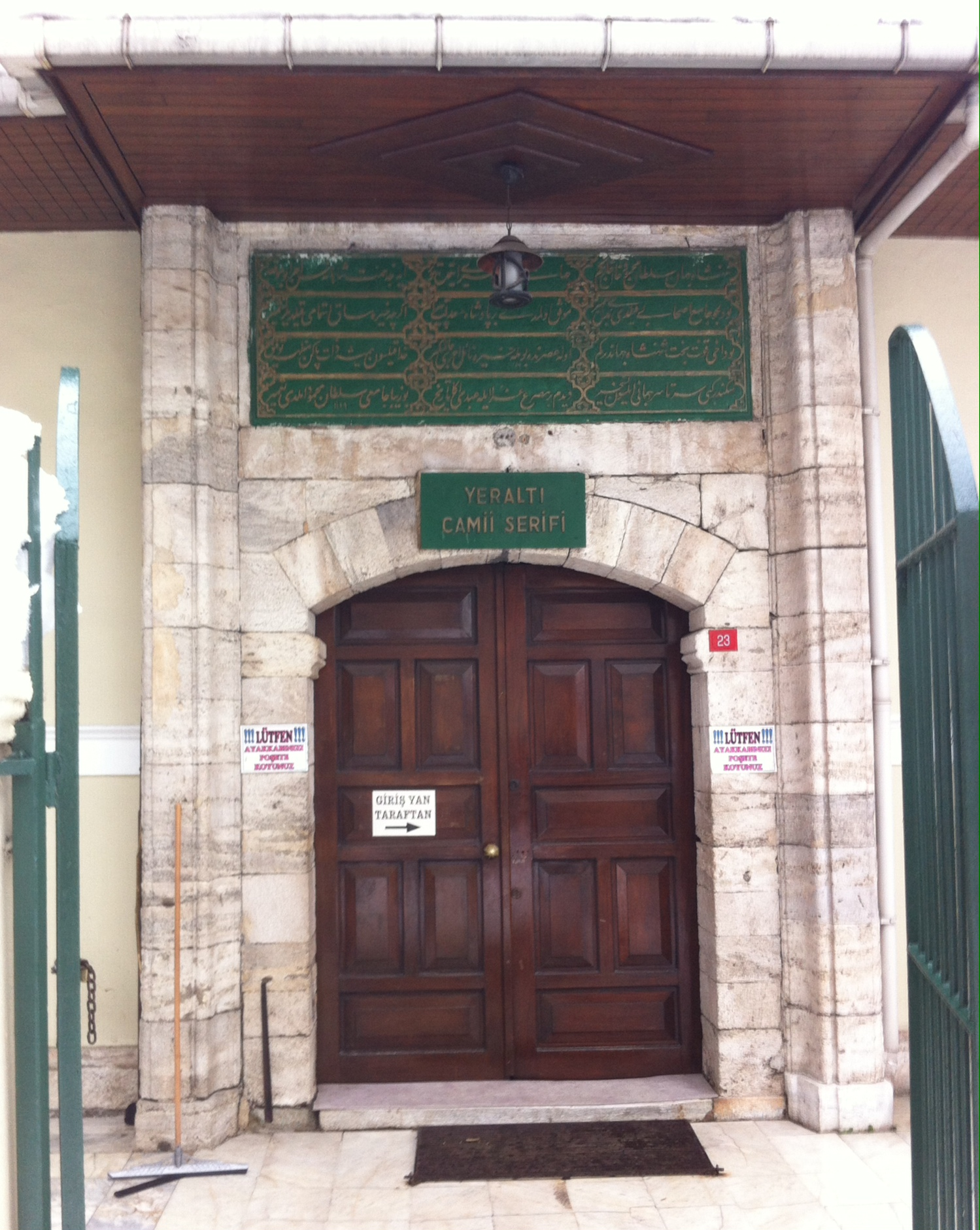
Main entrance

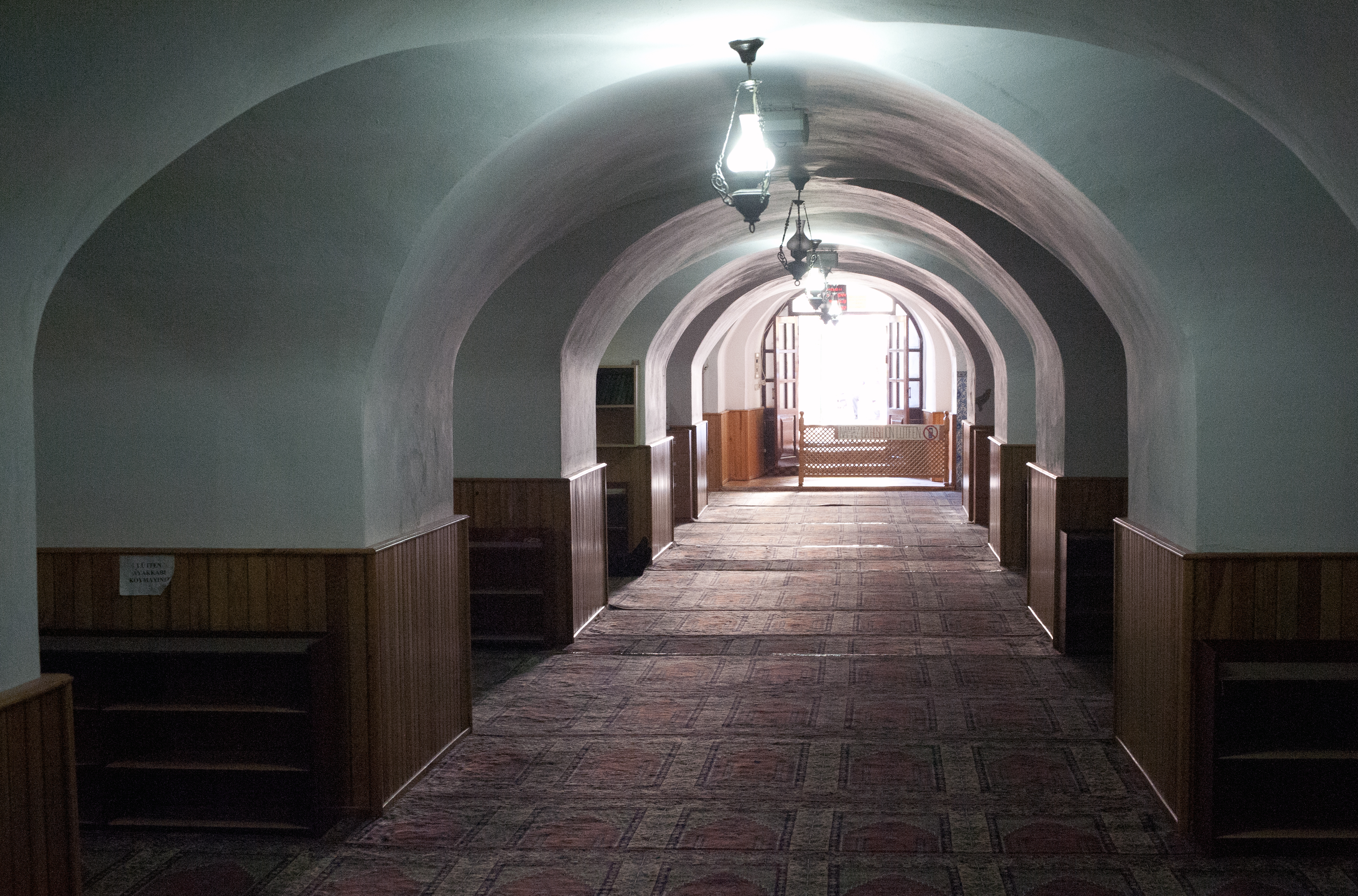
One of the hallways in the mosque

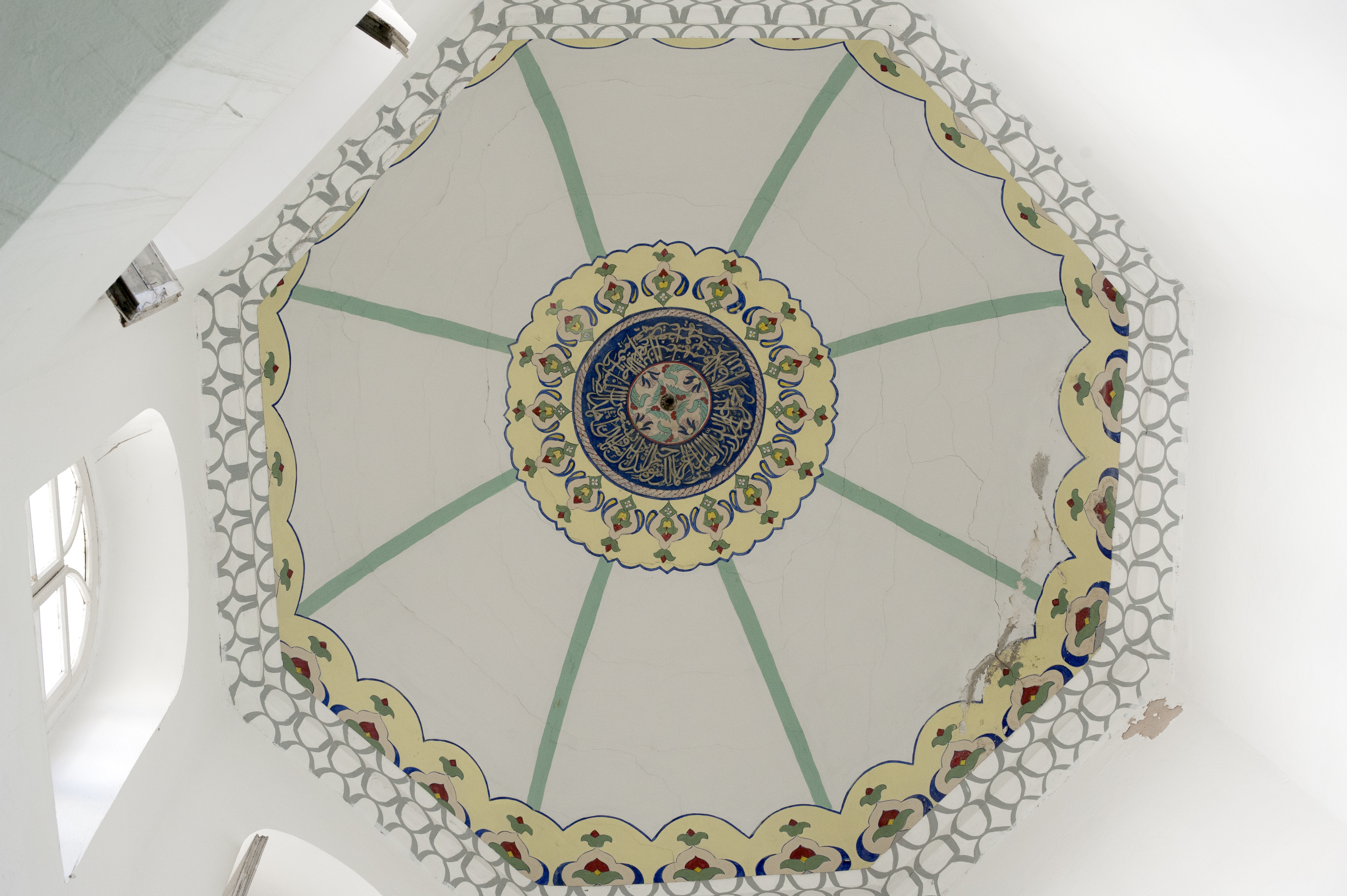
The dome above the tombs of Amr and Wahb

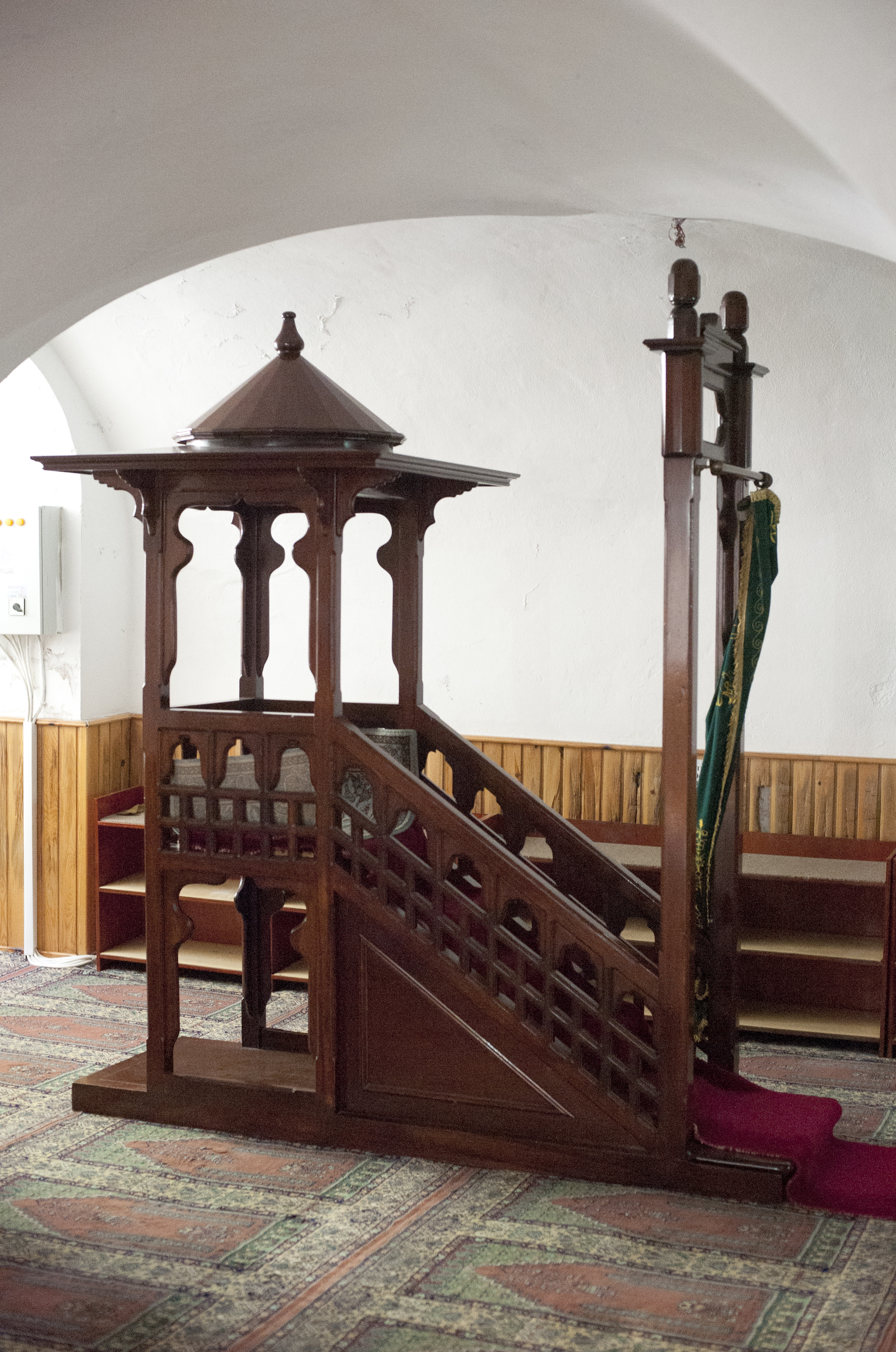
The minbar (pulpit) of the mosque

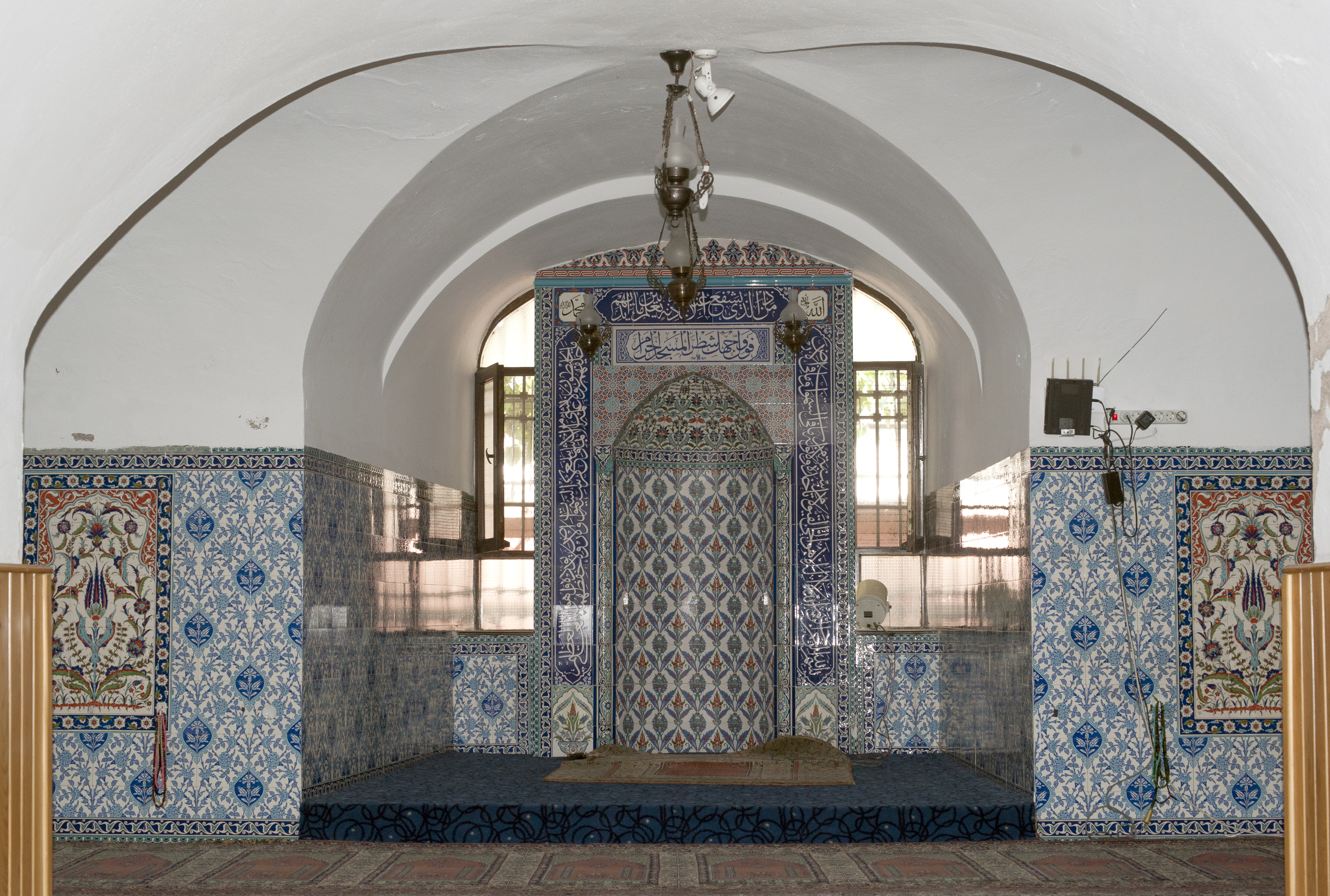
The mihrab of the mosque

== See also ==
- Islam in Turkey
- List of mosques in Turkey
