= Karaköy =

Quarter of Istanbul, Turkey

- Quarter
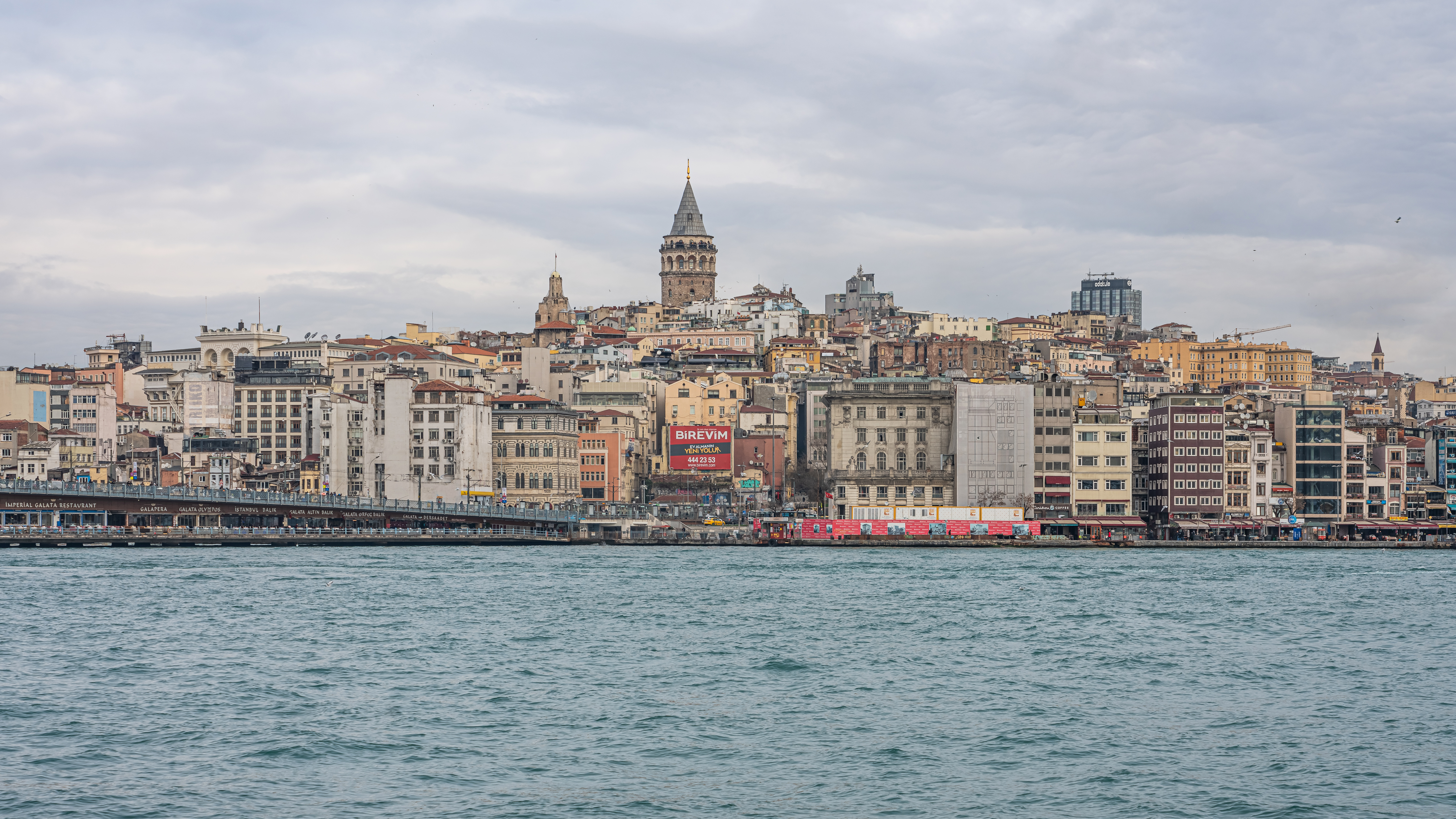
- A view of Karaköy (historically known as Galata) with the Galata Bridge and Galata Tower

- Location within Istanbul
- Coordinates: 41°01′22″N 28°58′30″E
- Country: Turkey
- Region: Marmara
- Province: Istanbul
- District: Beyoğlu
- Time zone: UTC+3 (TRT)
- Postal code: 34425
- Area code: 0212

Location of Karaköy (immediate north side of the Golden Horn-Bosphorus confluence)

Karaköy (Turkish pronunciation: [kaˈɾacøj]), historically known as Galata, is a quarter in the Beyoğlu district of Istanbul, Turkey, located at the northern part of the Golden Horn mouth on the European side of Bosphorus.

Karaköy is one of the oldest and most historic districts of the city, and is today an important commercial center and transport hub. It is connected with the surrounding neighborhoods by streets radiating out from Karaköy Square. The Galata Bridge links Karaköy to Eminönü in the historic Fatih district to the southwest, Tersane Street links it to Azapkapı to the west, Voyvoda Street (Bankalar Caddesi) links it to Şişhane to the northwest, the steeply sloping Yüksek Kaldırım Street links it to Pera in the north, and Kemeraltı Street and Necatibey Street link it to Tophane to the northeast.

The commercial quarter, which was originally the meeting place for banks and insurance companies in the 19th century, is today also home to mechanical, electrical, plumbing and electronic parts suppliers.

Karaköy has been a port area since Byzantine times when the north shore of the Golden Horn was a separate settlement facing Stamboul/Constantinople over the water. After the re-conquest of the city from the Latin State in 1261, the Byzantine emperor granted Genoese merchants permission to settle and do business here as part of a defense pact. The medieval citadel of Galata was a colony of the Republic of Genoa between 1273 and 1453. The famous Galata Tower was built by the Genoese in 1348 at the northernmost and highest point of the citadel.

== Etymology ==
The word Karaköy apparently combines the Turkish words "kara", usually meaning "black", and "köy" meaning "village". In this case, however, "kara" may have come from the Turkish word "Karay", referring to the Turkic-speaking Jewish community called the Crimean Karaites. Though, linguists such as Sevan Nişanyan contest this theory by claiming that it isn't supported by written sources.

Several theories exist concerning the origin of the name "Galata". The Greeks believe that the name comes either from Galatai (meaning "Gauls"), as the Celtic tribe of Gauls (Galatians) were thought to have camped here during the Hellenistic period before settling into Galatia in central Anatolia; or from galatas (meaning "milkman"), as the area was used by shepherds for grazing in the Early Medieval (Byzantine) period. According to another hypothesis, it is a variant of the Italian word calata, which means "a section of the docks of the ports intended for the mooring of merchant ships, for the direct embarkation or disembarkation of goods or passengers, for the temporary storage of goods and marine equipment", since the neighborhood was for centuries a Genoese colony. The name Galata has subsequently been given by the city of Genoa to its naval museum, Galata - Museo del mare, which was opened in 2004.

== History ==
=== Roman and Byzantine periods ===
In historic documents, Galata is often called Pera, which comes from the old Greek name for the place, Peran en Sykais, literally "the Fig Field on the Other Side."

The quarter first appears in Late Antiquity as Sykai or Sycae. By the time the Notitia Urbis Constantinopolitanae was compiled around 425 AD, it had become an integral part of the city as its 13th region. According to the Notitia, it featured public baths and a forum built by Emperor Honorius (r. 395–423), a theatre, a porticoed street, and 435 mansions. Also, the settlement probably was enclosed by walls in the fifth century. Sykai received full city rights under Justinian I (r. 527–565), who renamed it Iustinianopolis, but declined and was probably abandoned in the seventh century. Only the large tower, Megalos Pyrgos (the kastellion tou Galatou), which controlled the northern end of the sea chain that blocked the entrance to the Golden Horn, remained. Galata Tower (Christea Turris) was built in 1348 at the northern apex of the Genoese citadel.

In the 11th century, the quarter housed the city's Jewish community, which came to number some 2,500 people. In 1171, a new Genoese settlement in the area was attacked and nearly destroyed. Despite Genoese averments that Venice had nothing to do with the attack, the Byzantine Emperor Manuel I Komnenos (r. 1143–1180) used the attack on the settlement as a pretext to imprison all Venetian citizens and confiscate all Venetian property within the Byzantine Empire. The kastellion and the Jewish quarter were seized and destroyed in 1203 by the Catholic crusaders during the Fourth Crusade, shortly before the sack of Constantinople.

In 1233 during the subsequent Latin Empire (1204–1261), a small Catholic chapel dedicated to St. Paul was built in place of a sixth-century Byzantine church in Galata. This chapel was significantly enlarged in 1325 by the Dominican friars, who officially renamed it as the Church of San Domenico, but local residents continued to use the original denomination of San Paolo. In 1407, Pope Gregory XII, in order to ensure the maintenance of the church, conceded indulgences to the visitors of the Monastery of San Paolo in Galata. The building is known today as the Arap Camii (Arab Mosque) because a few years after its conversion into a mosque (between 1475 and 1478) under the Ottoman Sultan Mehmed II with the name Galata Camii (Galata Mosque; or alternatively Cami-i Kebir, i.e. Great Mosque), it was given by Sultan Bayezid II to the Spanish Moors who fled the Spanish Inquisition of 1492 and came to Istanbul.

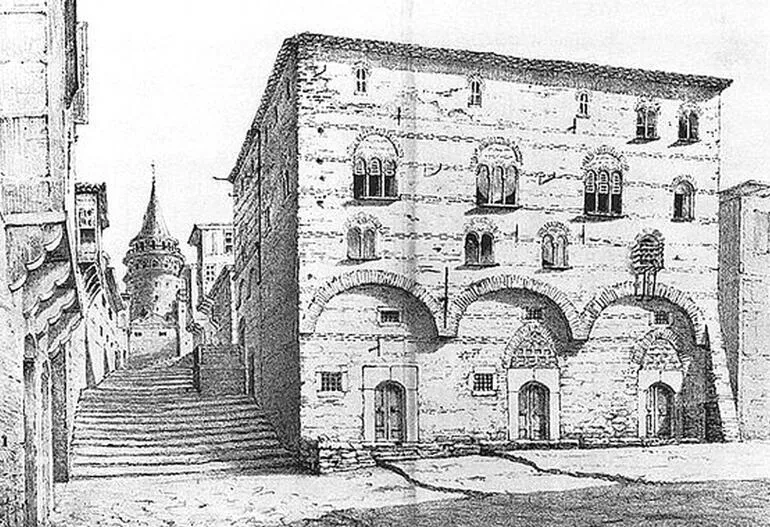
Genoese Palace (Palazzo del Comune), also known as the Palace of the Podestà (Podesta Sarayı) in Galata, with the Galata Tower (1348) at left. It was built in 1314 (damaged by fire in 1315 and repaired in 1316) by Montano De Marini, the Podestà of Galata.

In 1261, the quarter was retaken by the Byzantines, but Emperor Michael VIII Palaiologos (r. 1259–1282) granted it to the Genoese in 1267 in accordance with the Treaty of Nymphaeum. The precise limits of the Genoese colony were stipulated in 1303, and they were prohibited from fortifying it. The Genoese, however, disregarded this, and through subsequent expansions of the walls, enlarged the area of their settlement. These walls, including the mid-14th century Galata Tower (originally Christea Turris, "Tower of Christ", and completed in 1348) survived largely intact until the 19th century, when most were dismantled to allow further urban expansion towards the northern neighbourhoods of Beyoğlu, Beşiktaş, and beyond. At present, only a small portion of the Genoese walls are still standing, in the vicinity of the Galata Tower, the most substantial relic of the old walled enclave. Fifteenth-century Galata probably looked much more like an Italian city than a Byzantine or Ottoman one.

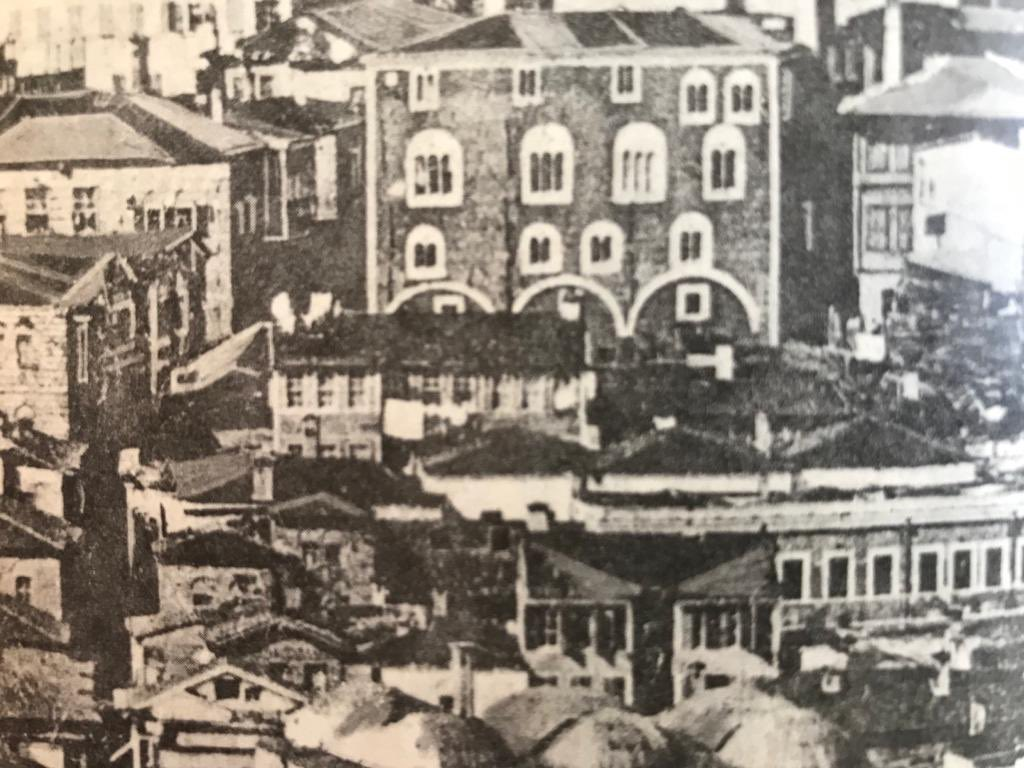
Genoese Palace (1314) before its front façade on Bankalar Caddesi was rebuilt with a different style in the 1880s and became known as the Bereket Han office building.

With its design modeled after the 13th-century wing of the Palazzo San Giorgio in Genoa, the Genoese Palace was built by the Podestà of Galata, Montano De Marini. It was known as the Palazzo del Comune (Palace of the Municipality) in the Genoese period and was initially built in 1314, damaged by fire in 1315 and repaired in 1316.

The building's appearance remained largely unchanged until 1880, when its front (southern) façade on Bankalar Caddesi (facing the Golden Horn), together with about two-thirds of the building, was demolished for constructing the street's tramway line. The front façade was later reconstructed in the 1880s with a different style and became a 5-floor office building named Bereket Han, while its rear (northern) façade on Kart Çınar Sokak (and the remaining one-third of the palace building) has retained the materials and design of the original structure, but needs restoration. Bankalar Caddesi has rows of Ottoman-era bank buildings, including the headquarters of the Ottoman Central Bank, which is today the Ottoman Bank Museum. Several ornaments that were originally on the façade of the Genoese Palace were used to embellish these 19th-century bank buildings in the late Ottoman period.

=== Ottoman period ===
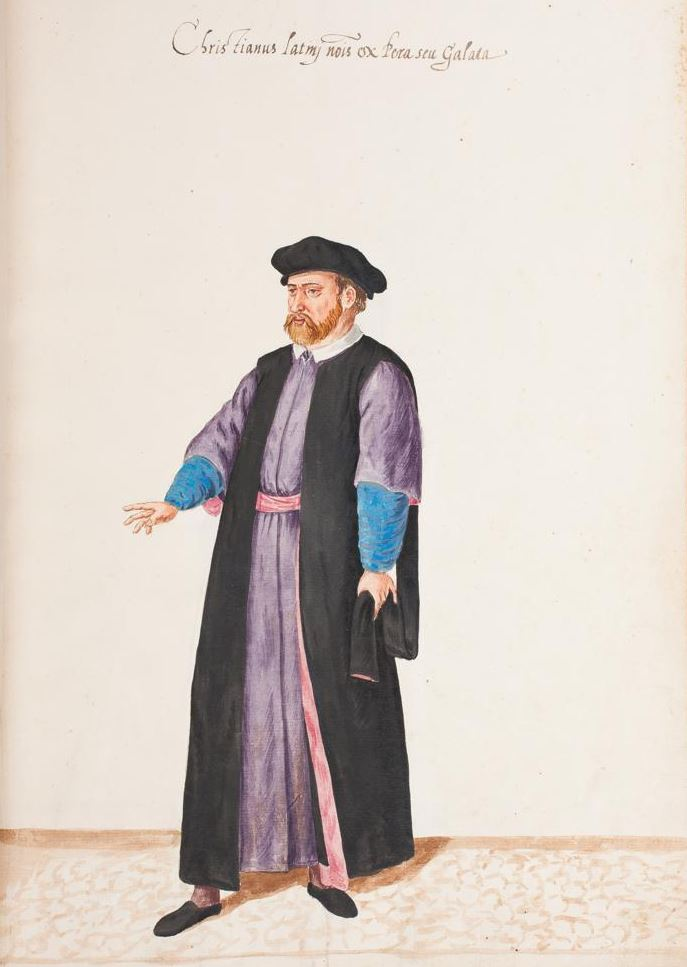
Latin man from Galata, depicted by Lambert de Vos in 1574

When Constantinople fell to Mehmed the Conqueror in 1453, the neighborhood was mostly inhabited by Genoese and Venetian Catholics, though there were also some Greek, Armenian and Jewish residents. The Christian residents of Galata maintained a formal neutrality during the Ottoman siege, neither siding with the Sultan, nor openly against him. One modern historian, Halil İnalcık, has estimated (based on a census from 1455) that around 8% of Galata's population fled after the city fell.

In 1455, the district had three categories of inhabitants: temporarily sojourning Genoese, Venetian and Catalan merchants; Genoese with Ottoman citizenship; and Greeks, Armenians and Jews.

In the 1455 census it is recorded that Jews primarily resided in the Fabya quarter and Samona (which is in the vicinity of present-day Karaköy). Though the Greek-speaking Jews of Galata appear to have retained their homes after the conquest, there are no Jewish households recorded in Galata by 1472, a situation that remained unchanged until the mid-16th century. The composition of the population quickly changed: according to a census of 1478, almost half the local population was Muslim. From 1500 on, Sephardic Jews settled here after they were expelled from Spain in 1492.

Contemporary accounts differ about the course of events that took place in Galata during the Ottoman conquest in 1453. By some accounts, those who remained in Galata surrendered to the Ottoman fleet, prostrating themselves before the Sultan and presenting to him the keys of the citadel. This account is fairly consistent in records from Michael Ducas and Giovanni Lomellino; but according to Laonikos Chalkokondyles, the Genoese mayor made the decision to surrender before the fleet arrived in Galata and relinquished the keys to the Ottoman commander Zagan Pasha, not the Sultan. One eyewitness, Leonard of Chios, describes the flight of Christians from the city:

"Those of them who did not manage to board their ships before the Turkish vessels reached their side of the harbor were captured; mothers were taken and their children left, or the reverse, as the case might be; and many were overcome by the sea and drowned in it. Jewels were scattered about, and they preyed on one another without pity."

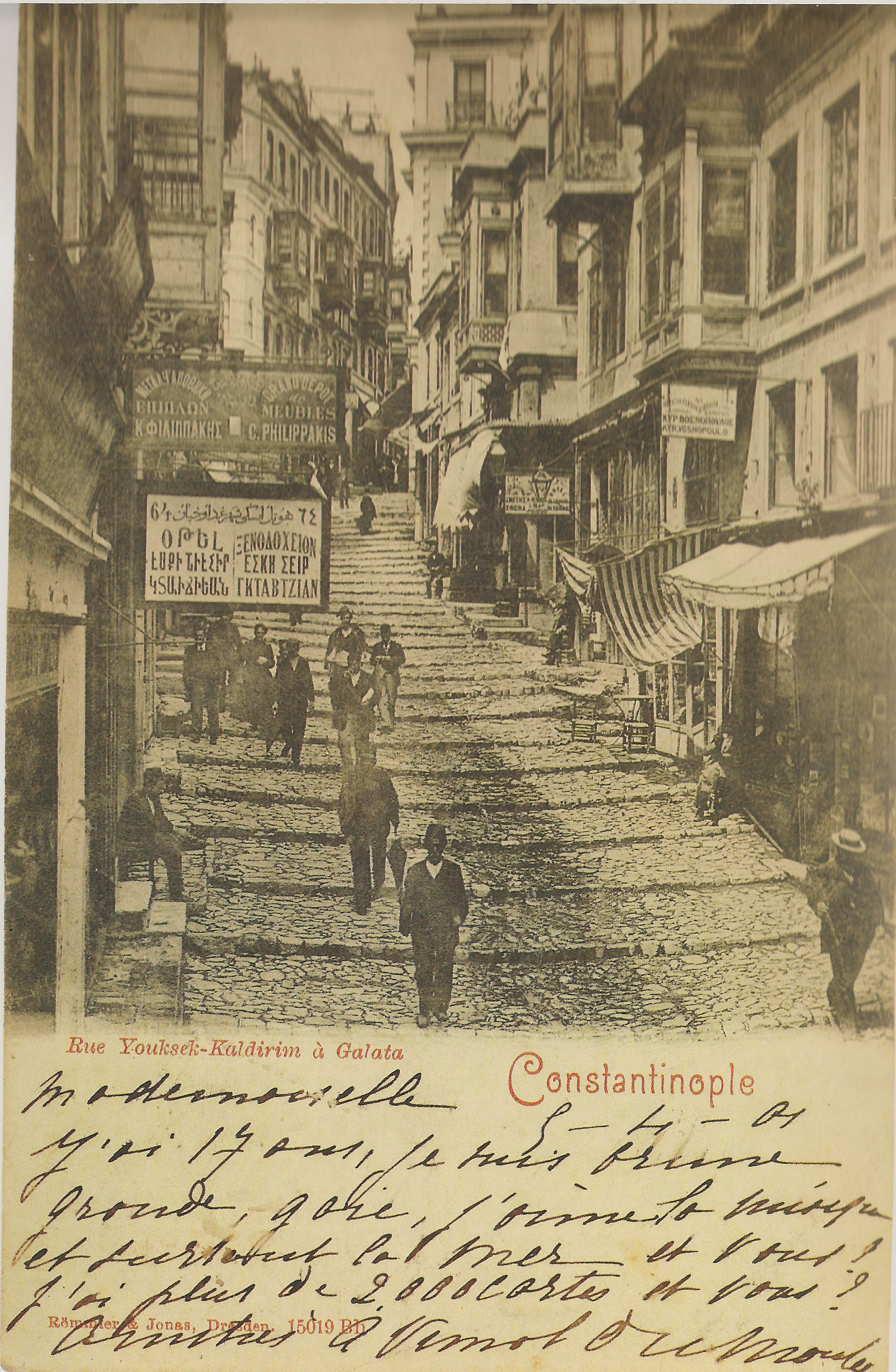
A 1901 postcard depicting Galata, showing signage in Ottoman Turkish, French, Greek, and Armenian.

According to Ducas and Michael Critobulus, the population was not harmed by Zaganos Pasha's forces, but Chalkokondyles does not mention this good conduct, and Leonard of Chios says the population acted against orders from Genoa when they agreed to accept servitude for their lives and property to be spared. Those who fled had their property confiscated; however, according to Ducas and Lomellino, their property was restored if they returned within three months.

Morisco who were expelled from Spain settled in Galata around 1609–1620, their descendants intermingled with the locals.

The French poet André Chénier was born in Karaköy in 1762; his father was a French merchant and diplomat, his mother an Ottoman Greek.

Galata and Pera in the late 19th and early 20th centuries were a part of the Municipality of the Sixth Circle (French: Municipalité du VIme Cercle), established under the laws of 11 Jumada al-Thani (Djem. II) and 24 Shawwal (Chev.) 1274, in 1858; the organisation of the central city in the city walls, "Stamboul" (Turkish: İstanbul), was not affected by these laws. All of Constantinople was in the Prefecture of the City of Constantinople (French: Préfecture de la Ville de Constantinople).

The Camondo Stairs, a famous pedestrian stairway designed with a unique mix of the Neo-Baroque and early Art Nouveau styles, and built in circa 1870–1880 by the renowned Ottoman-Venetian Jewish banker Abraham Salomon Camondo, is also located on Bankalar Caddesi. The seaside mansion of the Camondo family, popularly known as the Camondo Palace (Kamondo Sarayı), was built between 1865 and 1869 and designed by architect Sarkis Balyan. It is located on the northern shore of the Golden Horn, within the nearby Kasımpaşa quarter to the west of Galata. It later became the headquarters of the Ministry of the Navy (Bahriye Nezareti) during the late Ottoman period, and is currently used by the Turkish Navy as the headquarters of the Northern Sea Area Command (Kuzey Deniz Saha Komutanlığı). The Camondo family also built two historic apartment buildings in Galata, both of which are named Kamondo Apartmanı: the older one is located at Serdar-ı Ekrem Street near Galata Tower and was built between 1861 and 1868; while the newer one is located at the corner between Felek Street and Hacı Ali Street and was built in 1881.

Karaköy experienced a second wave of Christian arrivals when British, French and Italian forces of the Allies came to Istanbul to fight in the Crimean War (1854–1856). The lack of piers made the unloading of troops and military equipment difficult so in 1879, a French company obtained a concession to build a new quay in Karaköy, which was completed in 1895.

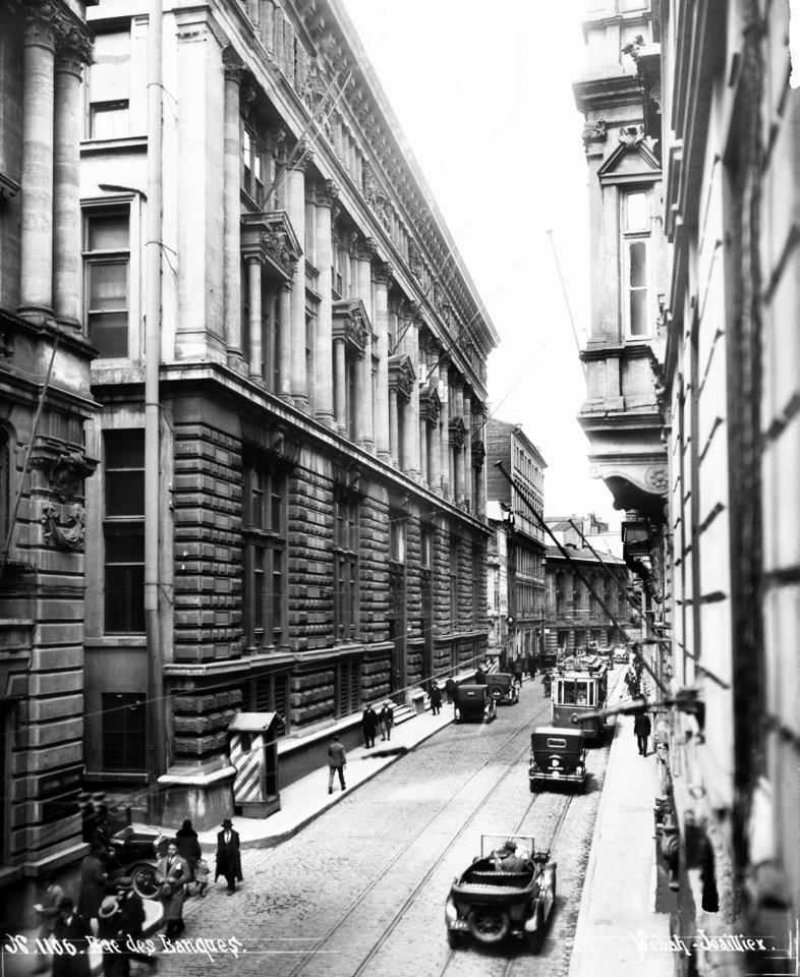
Bankalar Caddesi was Istanbul's financial center during the Ottoman period. Completed in 1892, the Ottoman Central Bank headquarters is the first building at right.

In the last decade of the 19th century, Karaköy developed into a banking and insurance hub, especially along Voyvoda Street (Bankalar Caddesi). The Ottoman Bank established its headquarters here while Italian and Austrian insurance companies opened branch offices.

Galatasaray S.K., one of the most famous football clubs of Turkey, gets its name from this quarter and was established in 1905 in the nearby Galatasaray Square in Pera (now Beyoğlu), where Galatasaray High School, formerly known as the Mekteb-i Sultani, also stands. Galatasaray literally means Galata Palace.

In the early 20th century, Galata housed embassies of European countries and sizeable Christian minority groups. At the time, signage in businesses was multilingual. Matthew Ghazarian described Galata in the early 20th century as "a bastion of diversity" which was "the Brooklyn to the Old City’s Manhattan."

As trading activity increased in the early 20th century, the port was expanded with customs buildings, passenger terminals and naval warehouses. Karaköy also became famous for the Greek taverns along the quay.

After 1917, thousands of White Russians fleeing the Bolshevik Revolution landed here and settled in the area.

During the British bombing of İstanbul in 1918, the area suffered.

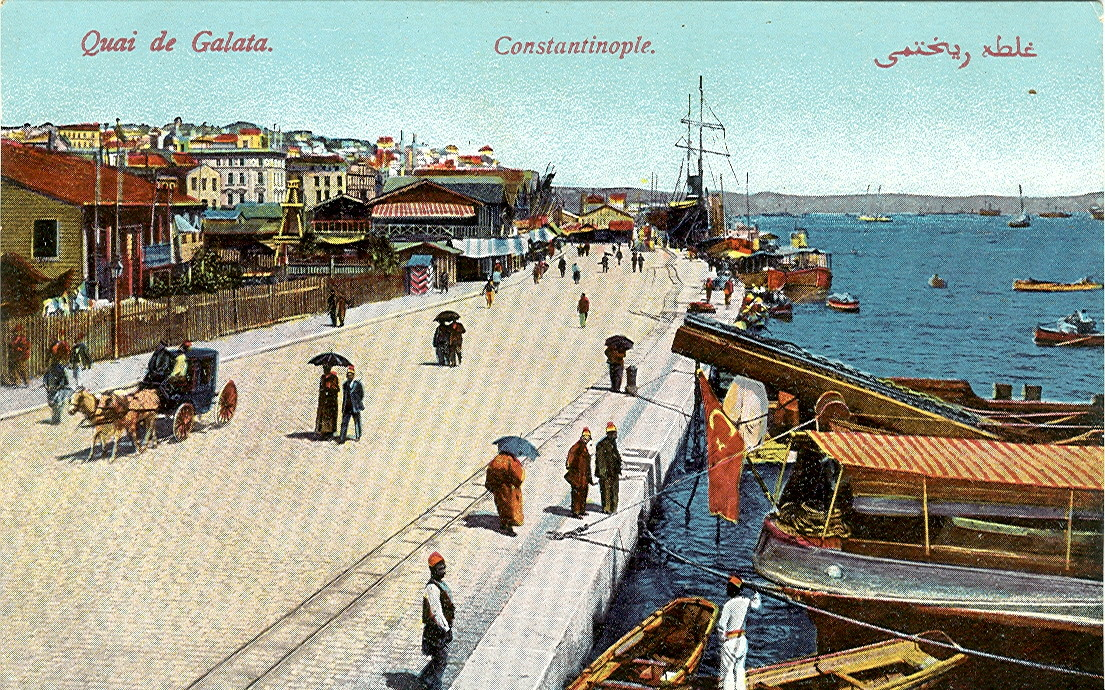
Galata (Karaköy) quayside in the early 20th century

== Transport ==
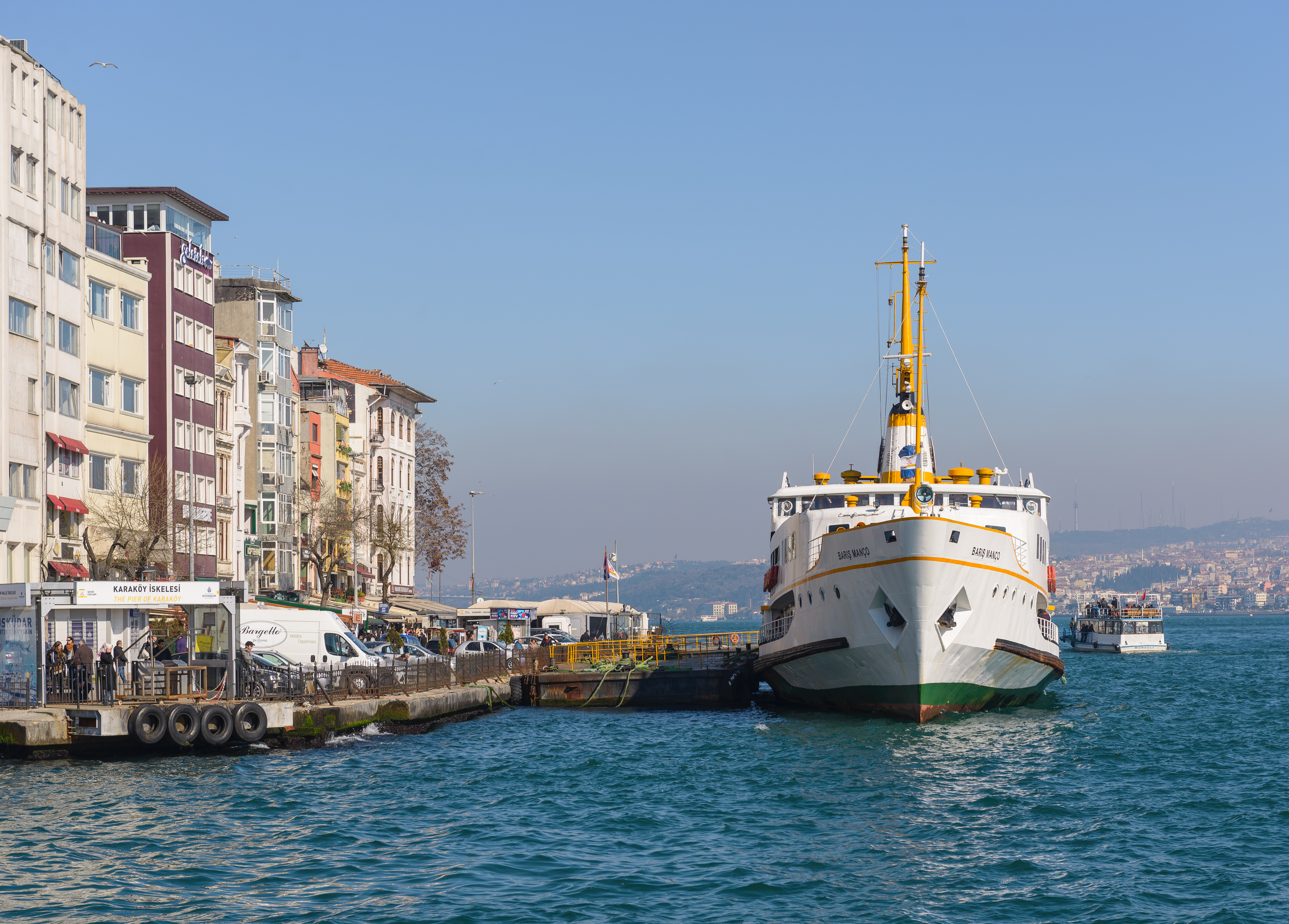
Ferries ashore Karaköy quay

Modern Karaköy is a major transport hub.

The Galata Bridge connects Karaköy with Eminönü and the historic parts of Istanbul; the T1 tram line crosses the bridge, linking Karaköy to Kabataş and Bağcılar. The Tünel funicular runs from Karaköy up to Tünel station at the start of İstiklal Caddesi.

Şehir Hatları ferries leave for Kadıköy and Üsküdar on the Asian shore of the Bosphorus, as well as for terminals along the Golden Horn as far as Eyüp.

Cruise ships from Mediterranean ports such as Piraeus in Greece, Dubrovnik in Croatia, Civitavecchia (Rome) and Venice in Italy berth at the nearby Galataport complex.

== Commerce ==
An active business center for centuries, Karaköy remains an important commercial hub for Istanbul. All kinds of hardware, tools, plumbing items and spare parts are for sale in Tersane Street in Perşembe Pazarı (literally Thursday Market). Selanik Pasajı, a shopping center right on Karaköy Square, contains shops specialising in electronic parts. The underpass providing safe passage under the busy square contains more shops.

Karaköy is a popular place to eat especially seafood, with several fish restaurants gathered around the local fish market. More fish restaurants line the underside of the Galata Bridge. Galataport is a large new dining and shopping development along the waterside.

Before the Covid pandemic, Istanbul's red-light district could also be found in Karaköy. However, in 2022 it was announced that the streets once filled with brothels (and where there are still the remains of a synagogue) would be redeveloped as an arts district.

== Media ==
In the Ottoman era many newspapers in non-Muslim minority and foreign languages were produced in Galata, with production in daylight hours and distribution at nighttime; Ottoman authorities did not allow production of the Galata-based newspapers at night.

== Sites of interest ==
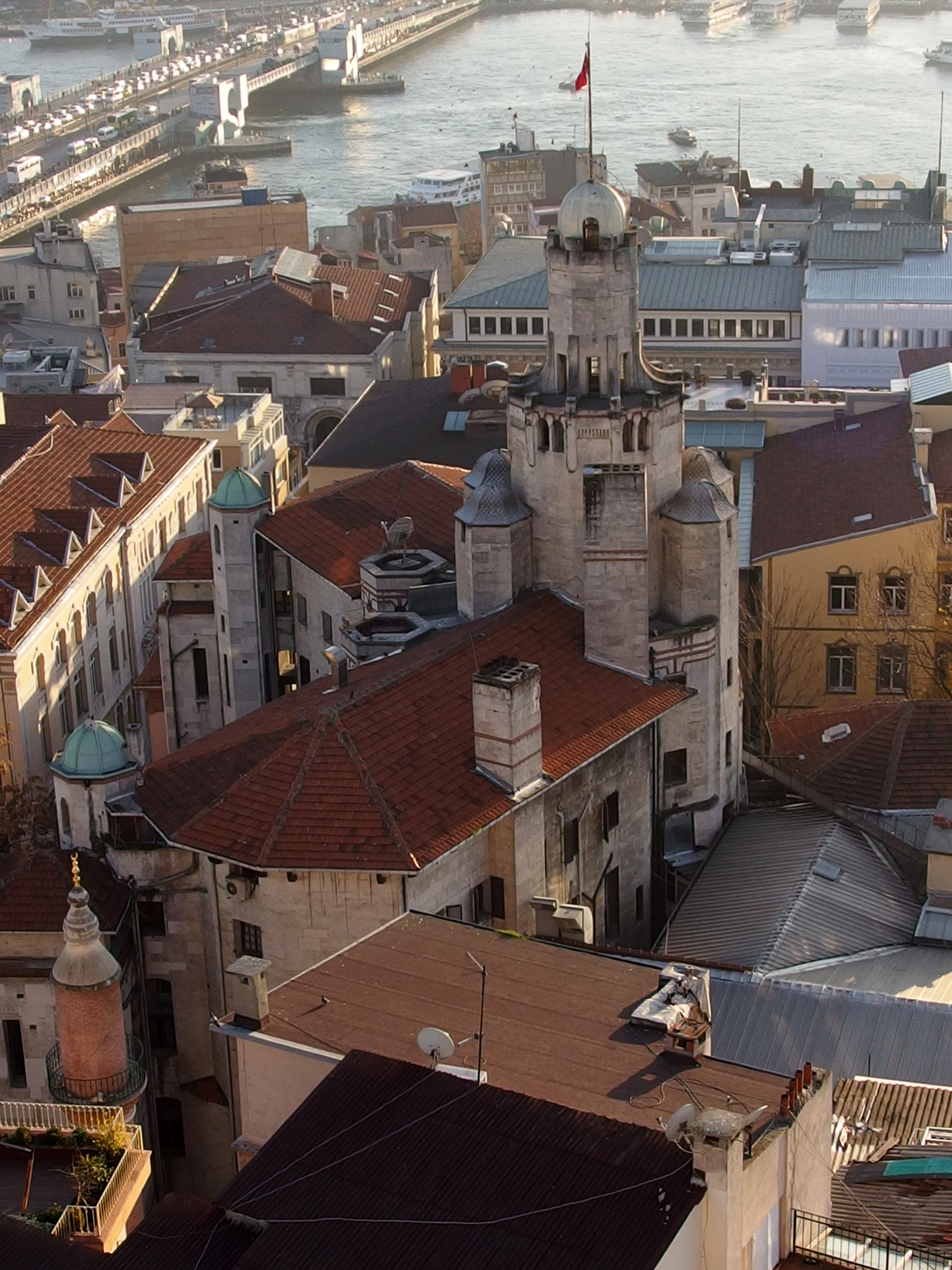
British Seaman's Hospital, usually mistaken for church. Now home to the state-run St George Eye Hospital

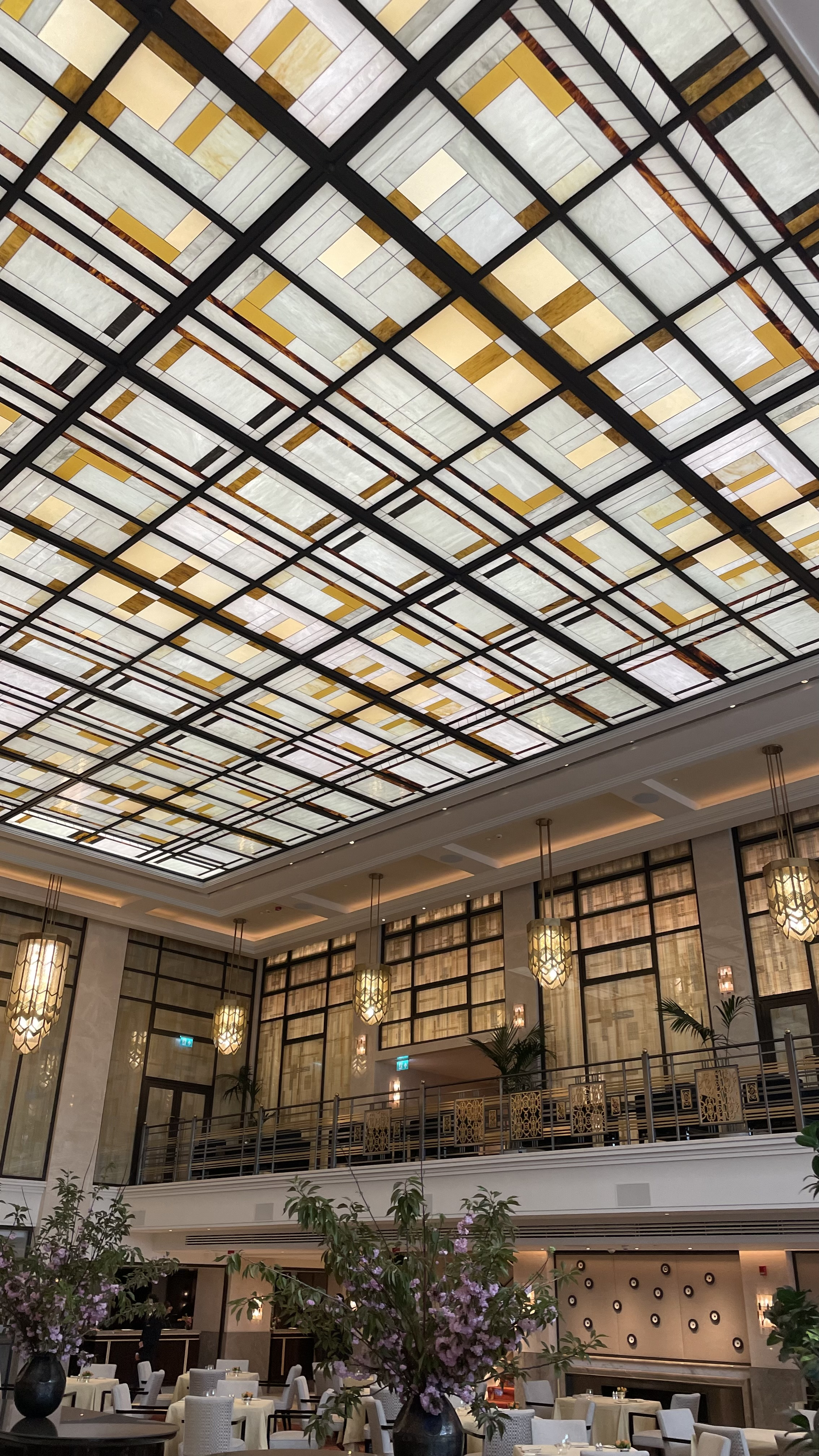
The Galata or Karaköy Yolcu Salonu, Istanbul's old cruise ship terminal now serves as a Peninsula Hotel.

Karaköy is a culturally diverse and historically rich part of Istanbul. For example, it contains many churches representing the Latin Catholic, Greek Orthodox, Turkish Orthodox, Russian Orthodox, Armenian and Bulgarian rites as well as a couple of Jewish synagogues. The Greek, Jewish, French, Italian and Austrian schools reflect its past cosmopolitan character.

The curvy Camondo Stairs, off Voyvoda Street, were donated by the wealthy Sephardic Jewish banker Abraham Camondo (1785–1873) and built in baroque style.

The large Galataport hotel, restaurant and cafe, shopping and office mixed-use development opened along the water in 2022.

- Genoese Palace (1314)
- Galata Tower (1348)
- St. George's Austrian High School (1882)
- Imperial Ottoman Bank
- British Seaman's Hospital (1904)

=== Museums ===
- Jewish Museum of Turkey
- Ottoman Bank Museum

Note: The Istanbul Modern, Turkey's first private museum dedicated to contemporary art since 2004, moved to a new location in Galataport in 2022.

=== Places of worship ===
Churches

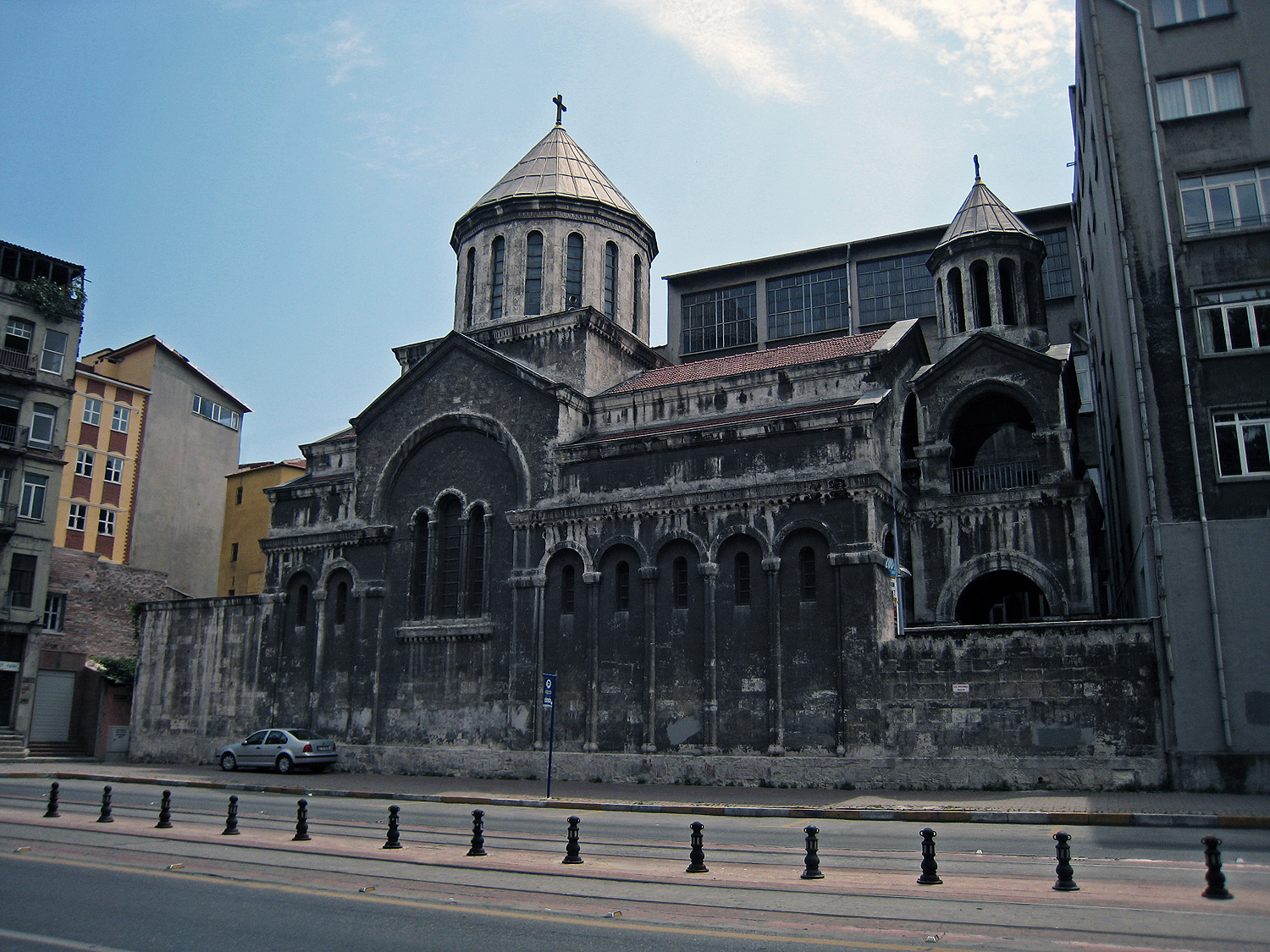
Saint Gregory the Illuminator Church of Galata, prior to its renovation

- San Pietro and Paolo Church, a Dominican church built 1604 by the Genoese next to their old Dominican convent, and rebuilt 1841–1843 by the Swiss Italian architect Gaspare Fossati, after having been destroyed twice by fire
- Sankt Georg Church, built 1675–1677 by Franciscan priests and restored 1908 by Austrian Lazarists
- San Michele Church
- San Francesco Church
- Santa Anna Church
- Santa Maria Church
- San Domenico Church
- San Zani Church
- Surp Sarkis Church built around 1360, the oldest Armenian church in Istanbul
- Surp Pırgiç Armenian Catholic Church, built 1834, served as the patriarchal seat from 1850 up to 1928, when the Patriarch moved to Beirut
- Surp Kirkor Lusavoric Armenian Church (1965)
- Saint Benoit Church and Monastery, a complex of church, monastery, school, hospital and orphanage built in 1427 by the Benedictines
- Galata Bulgarian Catholic Church, a small church built in early 20th century for the needs of the Catholic Bulgarian community.
- Haghios Nikolaos Turkish Orthodox Church
- Haghios Ionnis Syriac Church
- Saint Gregory the Illuminator Church of Galata (1391)
- Saint Pierre Han (1771)

Synagogues

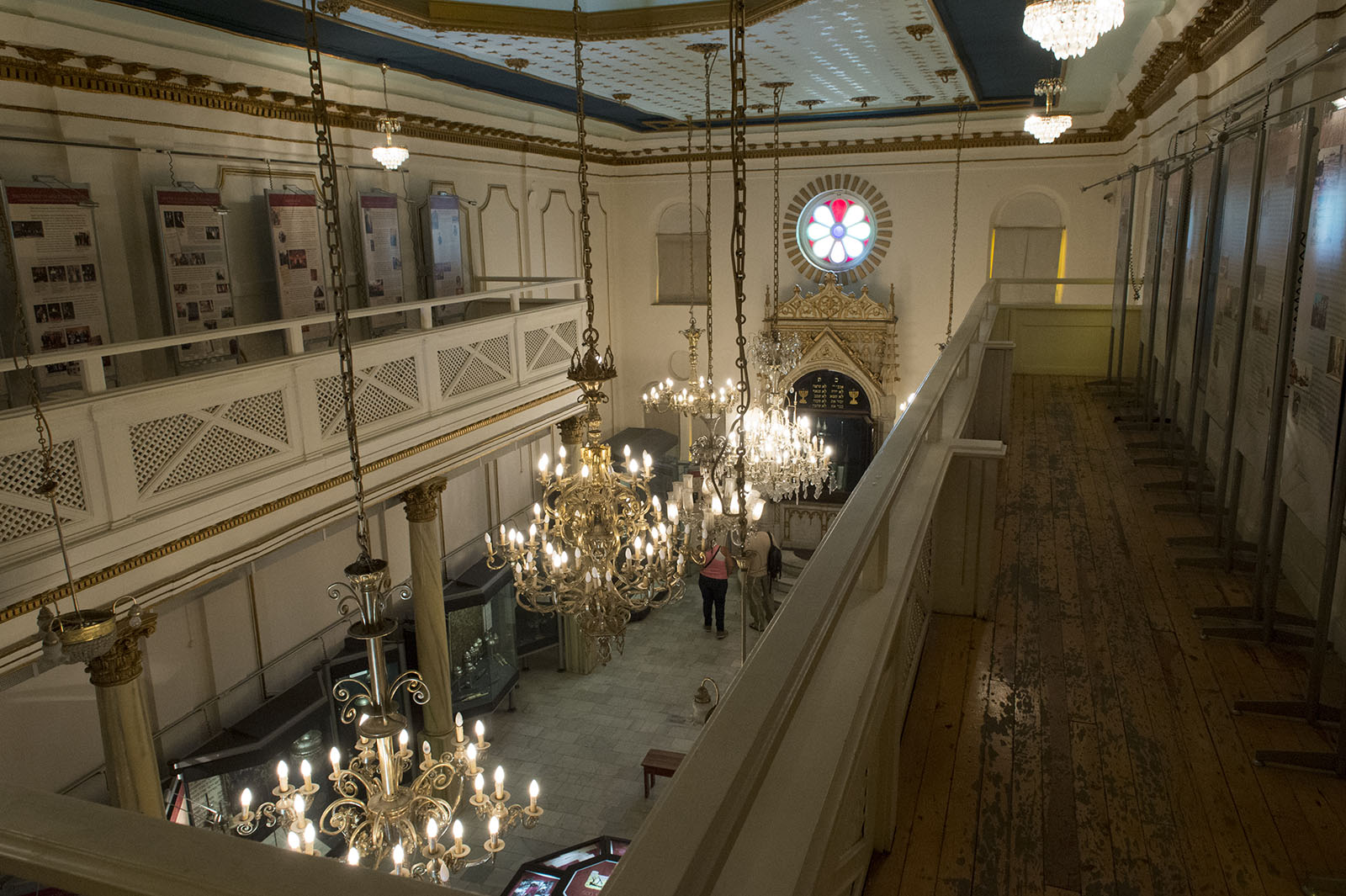
Zülfaris Synagogue houses the Jewish Museum of Turkey

- Tofre Begadim Synagogue (1894) (Schneider Synagogue) (used today as an art gallery)
- Italian Synagogue (1931)
- Zülfaris Synagogue (1823)
- Or Hodeş Synagogue, built in 1897 by Georgian Jews, now in ruins.
- Yüksek Kaldırım Ashkenazi Synagogue, built in 1900 by architect Gabriel Tedeschi
- Neve Shalom Synagogue (1951)

Mosques

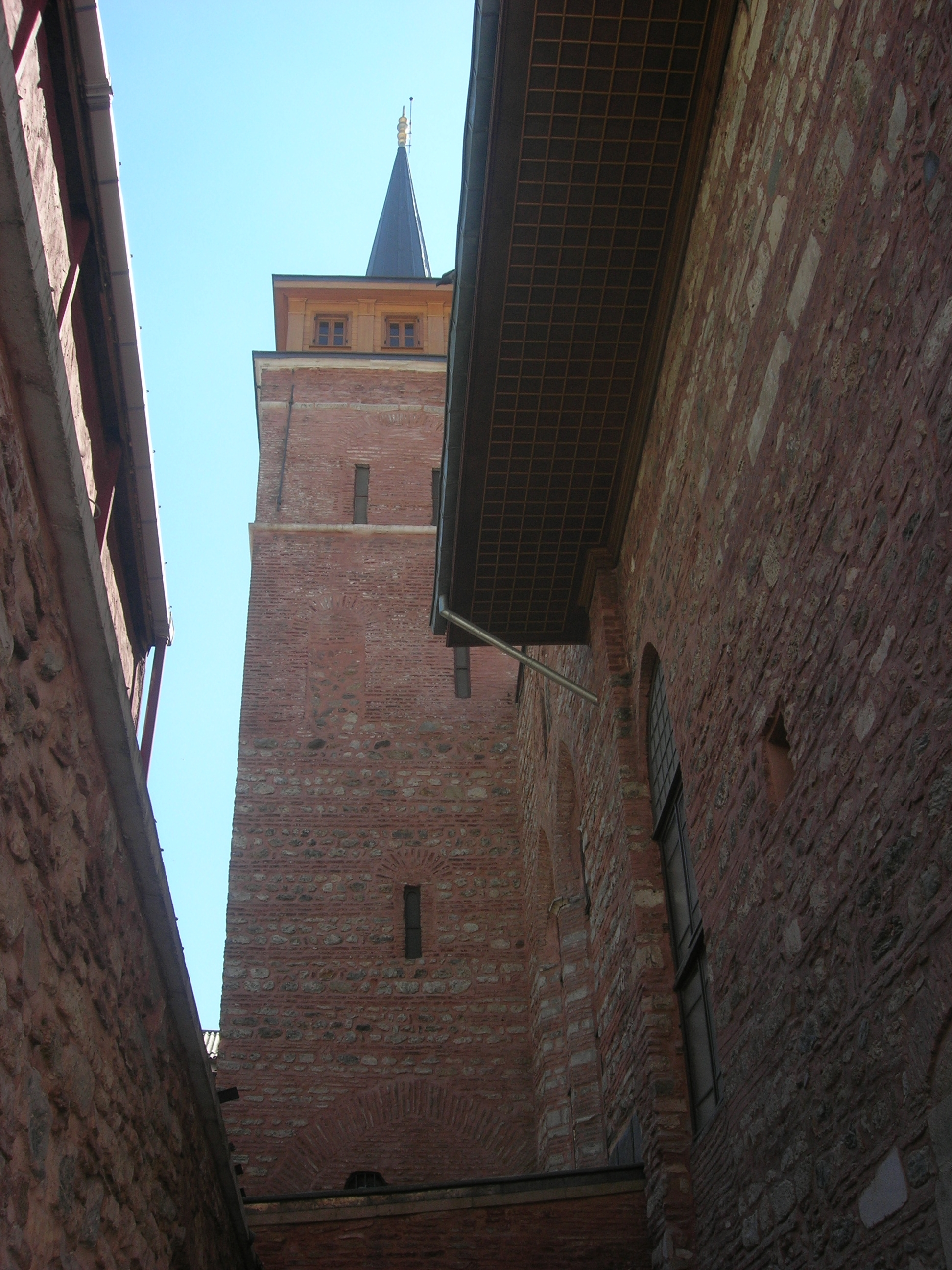
Minaret of the Arap Mosque, originally the belfry of the Church of San Domenico which was built in 1325 by Dominican friars in Galata.

- Arap Mosque with its square-shaped minaret, the oldest mosque in Istanbul to be converted from a church, was used by Arab immigrants fleeing the Spanish Inquisition (1325)
- Sokullu Mosque or Azapkapi Mosque
- Yeralti Mosque (the Underground Mosque) built in the 17th century

== Education ==
- Österreichisches St. Georgs-Kolleg Istanbul
- Deutsche Schule Istanbul (Özel Alman Lisesi) – private school teaching in German
- Liceo Scientifico Italiano
- St. Benoit High School, founded 1583 by French Jesuit missionaries and co-educational since 1987
- Karaköy Greek Orthodox High school
- Getronagan Armenian High School, founded in 1886

== Notable natives and residents ==
- André Chénier, French poet associated with the French Revolution
- Abraham Salomon Camondo (1781–1873), financier and philanthropist
- Constantine Samuel Rafinesque-Schmaltz (1783–1840) botanist and zoologist
- Seydi Ali Reis (1498–1563), admiral and navigator

== Gallery ==
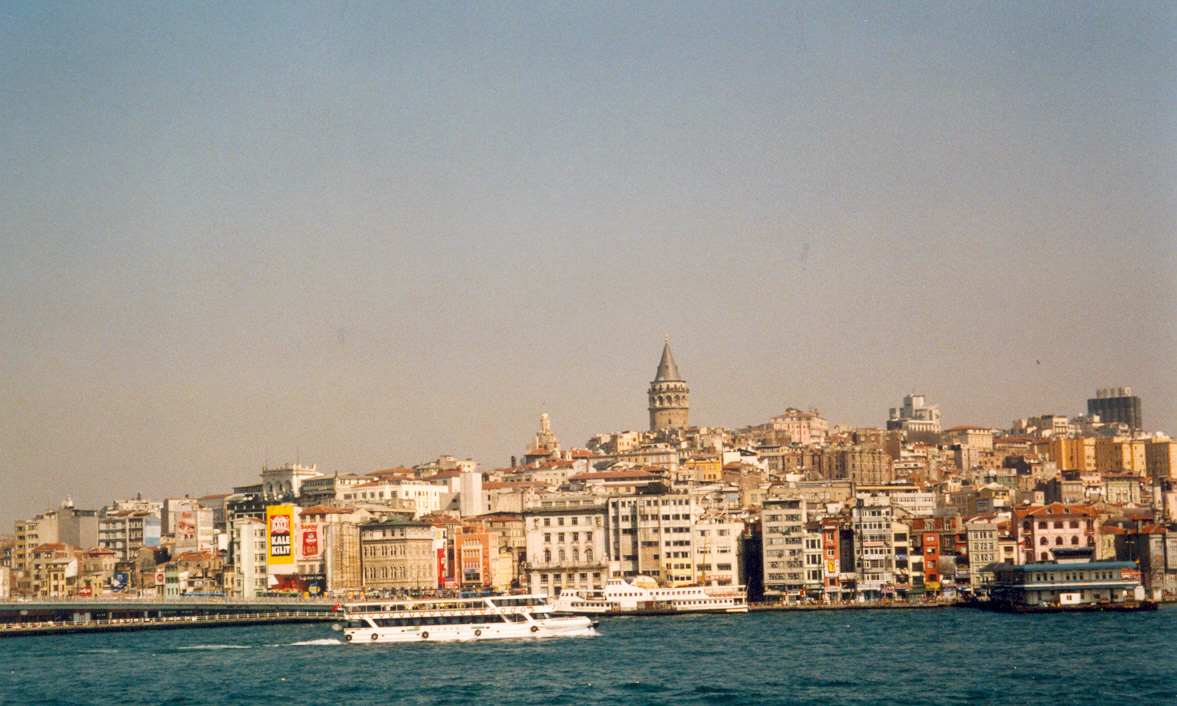
View of Galata (Karaköy) and the Galata Tower from Eminönü across the Golden Horn

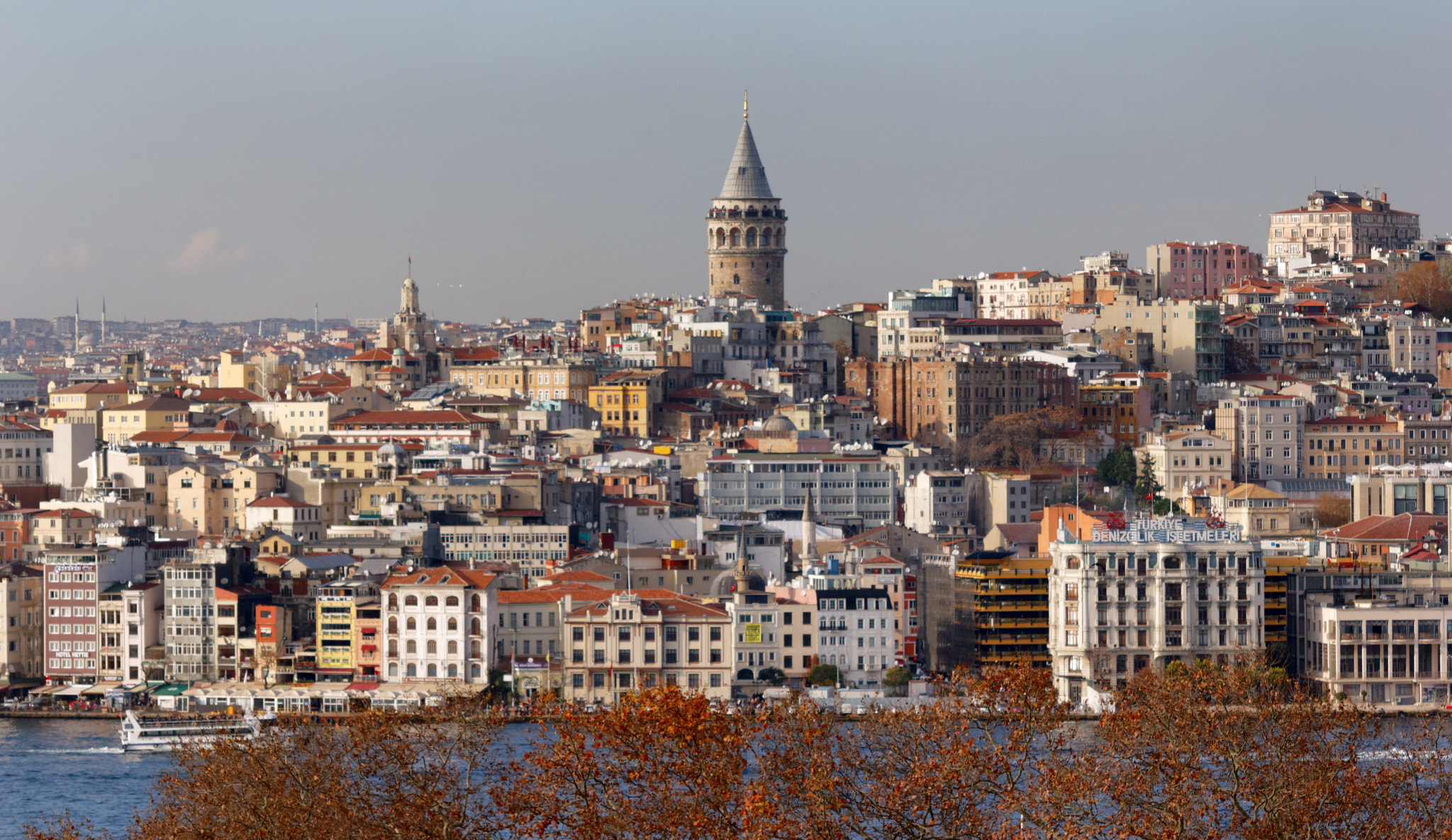
View of Galata (Karaköy) and the Galata Tower from Sarayburnu across the Golden Horn

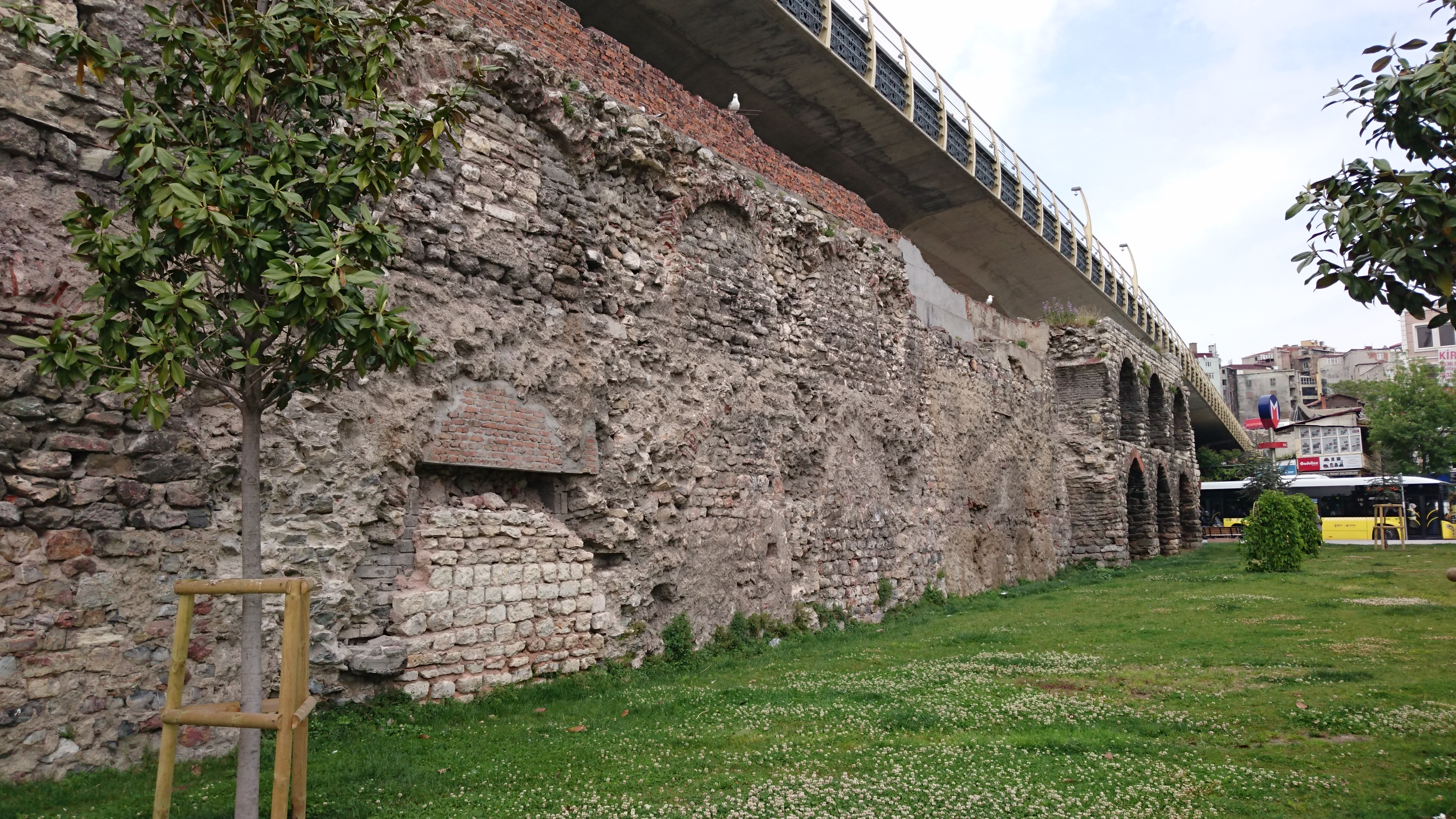
Surviving section of the Walls of Galata

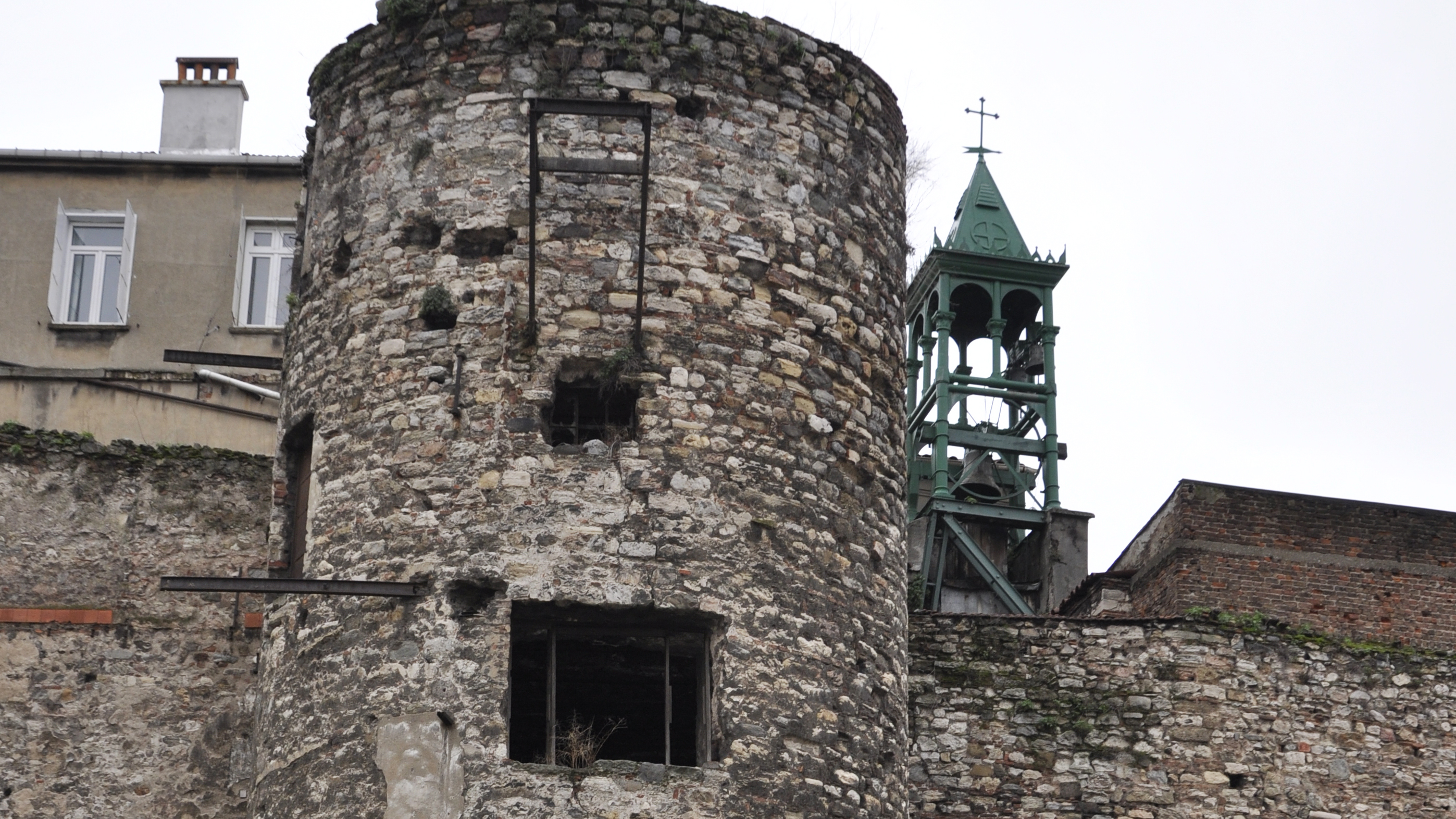
Another surviving section of the Walls of Galata. The bell tower is that of the Church of SS Peter and Paul
