= Arap Mosque =

Mosque in Istanbul, Turkey

Arap Camii
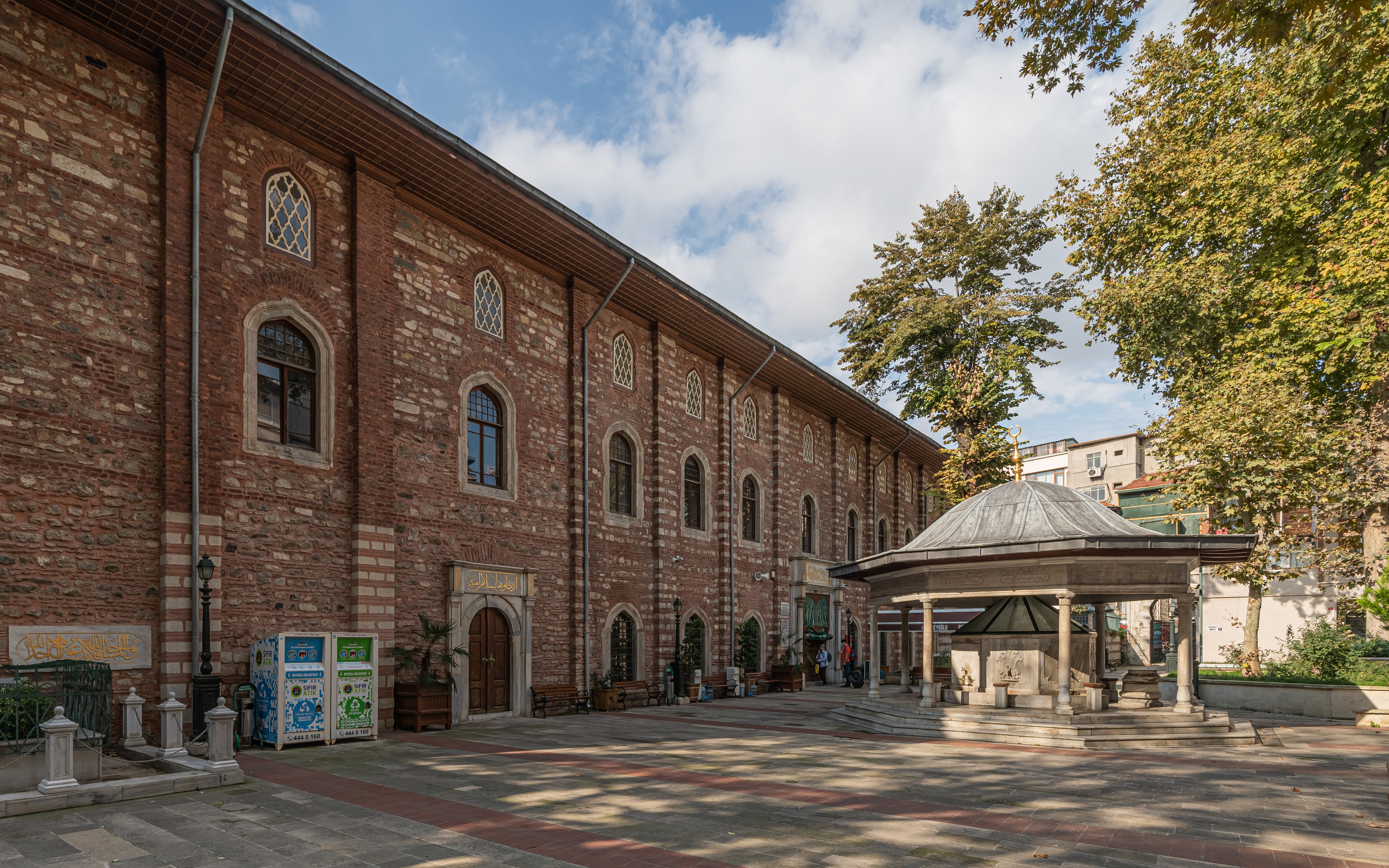
- General view of the mosque building with its sadirvan on the right seen from the courtyard.

- Location in the Beyoğlu district of Istanbul

Religion
- Affiliation: Sunni Islam
- Year consecrated: end of 15th century

Location
- Location: Istanbul
- Coordinates: 41°01′27.552″N 28°58′15.744″E

Architecture
- Type: Church
- Style: Gothic
- Groundbreaking: 1323
- Completed: 1325
- Minaret: 1

Arap Mosque (Turkish: Arap Camii, lit. 'Arab mosque') is a mosque in the Karaköy quarter of Istanbul, Turkey. The building was originally a Roman Catholic church erected in 1325 by the friars of the Dominican Order, near or above an earlier chapel dedicated to Saint Paul (Italian: San Paolo) in 1233. Although the structure was altered during the Ottoman period, it is the only example of medieval religious Gothic architecture remaining in Istanbul.

The church was converted into a mosque by the Ottomans between 1475 and 1478, during the reign of Sultan Mehmed II, and became known as the Galata Mosque. It was later given by Sultan Bayezid II to Muslim refugees from Al-Andalus who escaped the Spanish Inquisition in 1492 and settled in the Galata neighborhood of Istanbul (hence its current name, Arab Mosque).

== Location ==
The building lies in Istanbul's Beyoğlu district, in the neighborhood of Karaköy (medieval Galata), on Galata Mahkemesi Sokak, not far from the northern shores of the Golden Horn. It is surrounded by artisan shops.

== History ==
=== Byzantine period ===
During the 6th century, a Byzantine church, possibly dedicated to Saint Irene, was built here. Of this building, only part of a wall survives today.

The tradition which affirms that a mosque was built on this site during the Second Arab Siege of Constantinople in 717–18 by the Umayyad prince and general Maslama ibn Abd al-Malik is a later, Ottoman-era legend. The Ottoman chroniclers describe the spot as the burial place of Maslama ibn Abd al-Malik, hence the alleged tomb and mosque, but they confused the second Arab siege with the first Arab siege a generation before, and placed the construction of the mosque to around 686.

In 1233, during the Latin Empire of Constantinople (1204–1261) founded after the Fourth Crusade, this church was replaced with a small chapel, dedicated to Saint Paul (San Paolo).

In 1299, the Dominican Friar Guillaume Bernard de Sévérac bought a house near the church, where he established a monastery with 12 friars. In 1307, Byzantine Emperor Andronikos II Palaiologos moved the Dominicans of Constantinople to the Genoese-held suburb of Pera.

A new, much larger church was built near or above the chapel of San Paolo in 1325. Thereafter the church was officially dedicated to San Domenico, but local residents continued to use the ancient denomination. In 1407 Pope Gregory XII, in order to ensure the maintenance of the church, conceded indulgences to the visitors of the monastery of San Paolo.

=== Ottoman period ===
After the Fall of Constantinople, according to the Capitulations of the Ottoman Empire with the Republic of Genoa, the church, which by that time was known by the Turks under the name of Mesa Domenico, remained in Genoese hands, but between 1475 and 1478 it was transformed, with minor modifications, into a mosque by the Ottoman Sultan Mehmed II and became known as Galata Camii ("Galata Mosque") or Cami-i Kebir ("Great Mosque"). The friars were transferred in the friary of San Pietro in Galata in 1476, while all the altar clothes had already been brought to Genoa, and the archives to Caffa.

Towards the end of the century Sultan Bayezid II assigned the building to the Muslim of Spain (Moriscos) who had fled the Spanish Inquisition and migrated to Istanbul; hence the present name Arap Camii (Arab Mosque). Sultan Mehmed III repaired the building, and towards the end of seventeenth century the houses which encroached upon the mosque were pulled down in order to avoid noise.

After the 1731 Great Fire of Galata, in 1734/35 the mother of Mahmud I, Saliha Sultan renovated the building, changing the windows and the portal from the Gothic to the Ottoman style. After another fire in 1808, in the mid-nineteenth century, the daughter of Mahmud II, Adile Sultan, repaired the mosque again and in 1868 built a şadirvan (fountain for ritual ablutions before praying) in the courtyard.

Between 1913 and 1919, Giridli Hasan Bey extensively restored the edifice again. During the replacement of the wooden floor, several Genoese tombstones dating back to between the first half of fourteenth and up to the middle of the fifteenth centuries were discovered. They were brought to the Istanbul Archaeology Museum.

At the beginning of the 2010s, the mosque underwent an extensive restoration, which was finished in 2013. An inaccurate inscription that the mosque was founded in 715 AD was also installed in front of the mosque as part of the restoration.

== Description ==
Erected according to the model of the Italian mendicant order churches of that period, the church had a three-nave rectangular base, with squared-off eastern end and a square sanctuary which is covered by ribbed groin vaults.

The Gothic-style portal, lancet windows and the prominent bell tower (which has been transformed into a minaret by the addition of a conical roof) distinguished the building from the Byzantine churches in the city. On the other side, the technique used for the brickwork was local, and alternated small courses of bricks and ashlar.

The NE nave was possibly flanked by a series of chapels, each of them belonging to a noble Genoese family. One of them was dedicated to the Virgin Mary, and another to Saint Nicholas. As a whole, the building resembled the churches of Chieri and Finale Ligure in Italy.

The flat wooden roof and rather pretty wooden galleries date from the restoration in 1913-1919. On this occasion, the height of the building was lowered, and many Genoese headstones were found. During the same restorations, rests of paintings were also discovered near the Mihrab, but were covered again.

In the passage under the belfry, moldings are still visible, as well as fragments of stones with armorial bearings which were once placed along the wall. On the north side of the building there is a large and attractive courtyard with a şadırvan.

Today, Arap Camii is the largest mosque on the Galata side of the Golden Horn. It is one of the most interesting mosques in the city due to its early Italian Gothic architectural style and church belfry, which has practically remained unaltered even after being converted into a minaret.

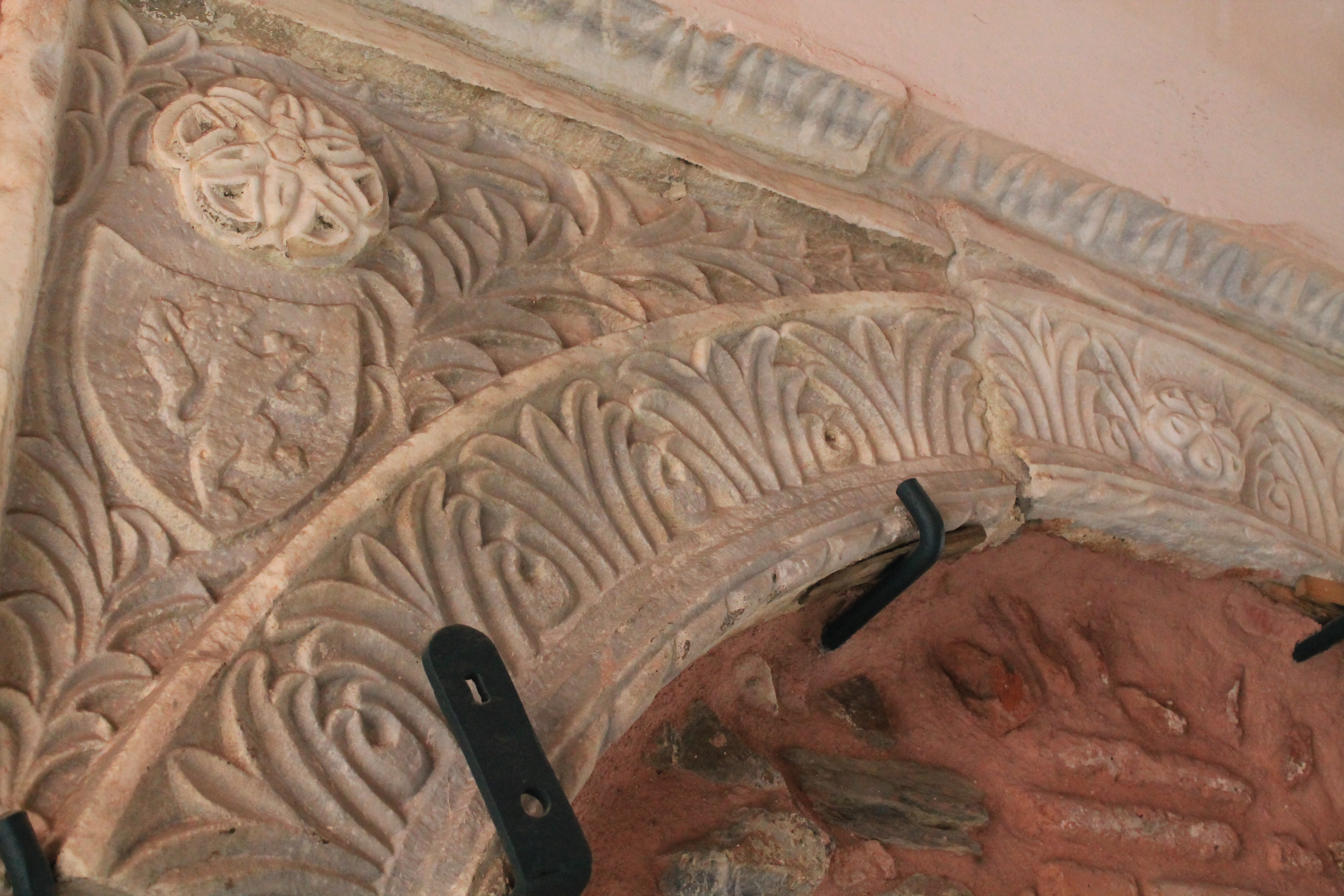
Heraldic lion sculpture

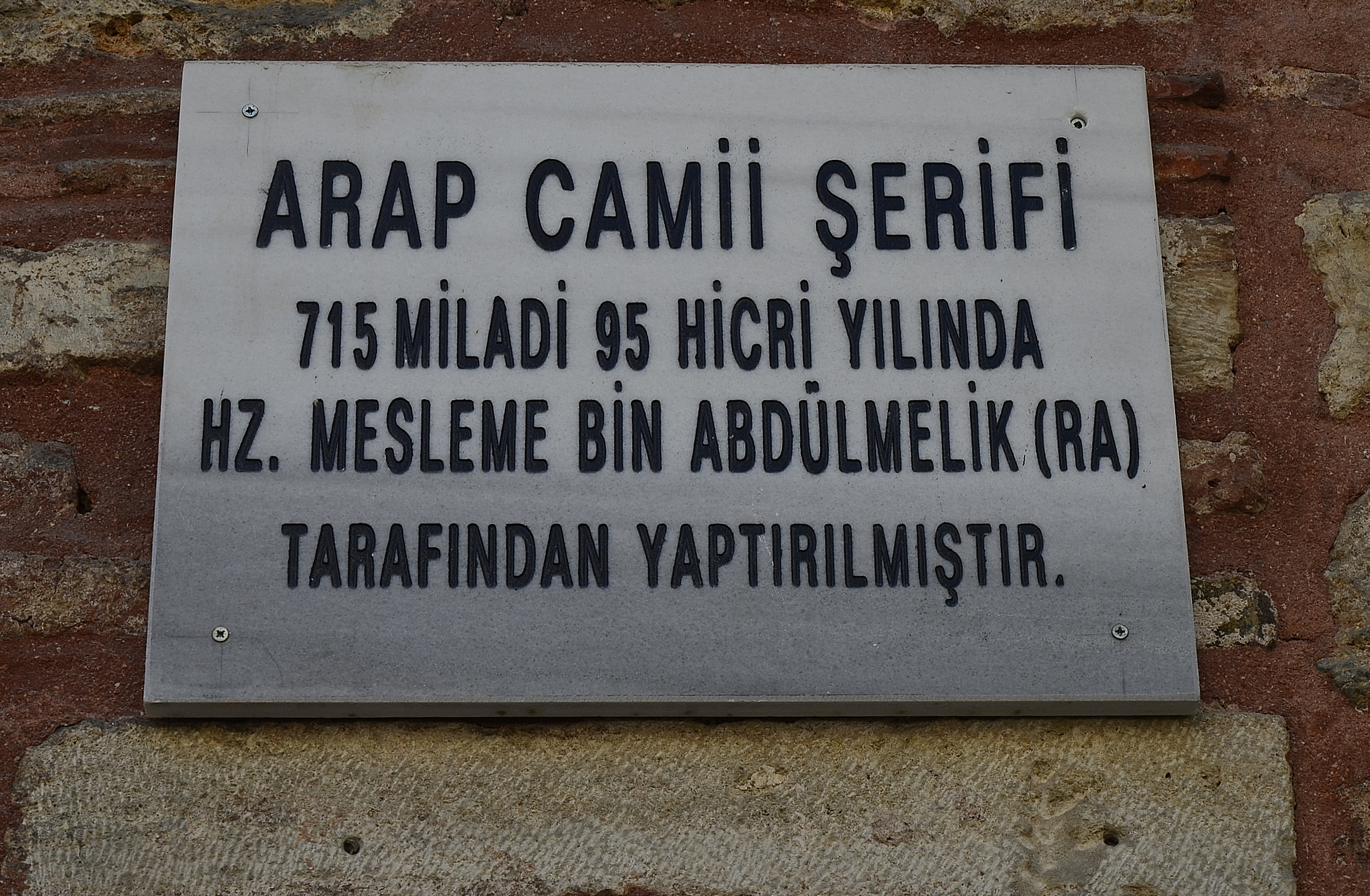
Inscription placed in front of the building in 2013, which records the mosque's legendary foundation by Maslama ibn Abd al-Malik (erroneously put in 715 AD) as its actual foundation date

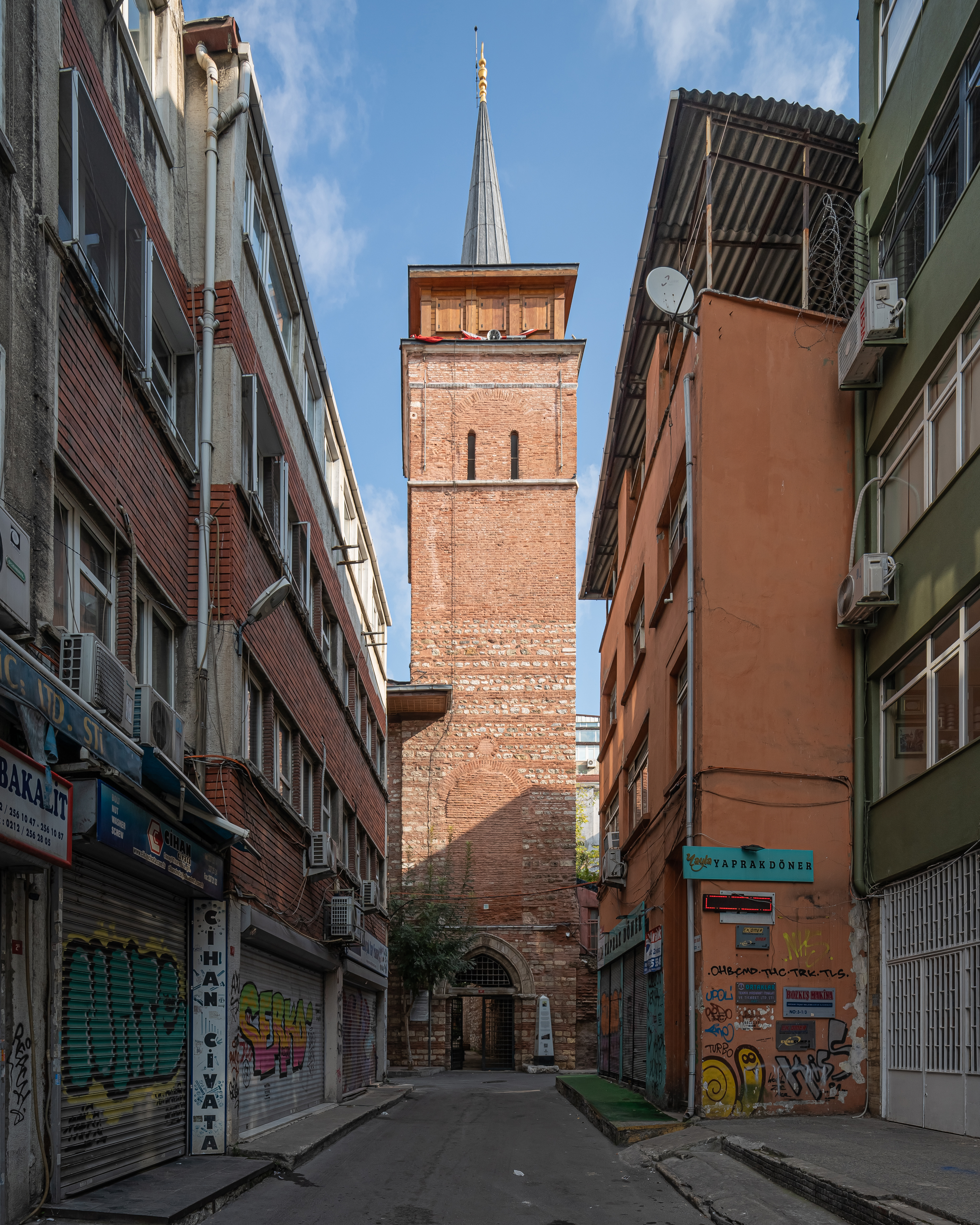
View of the minaret, originally the belfry

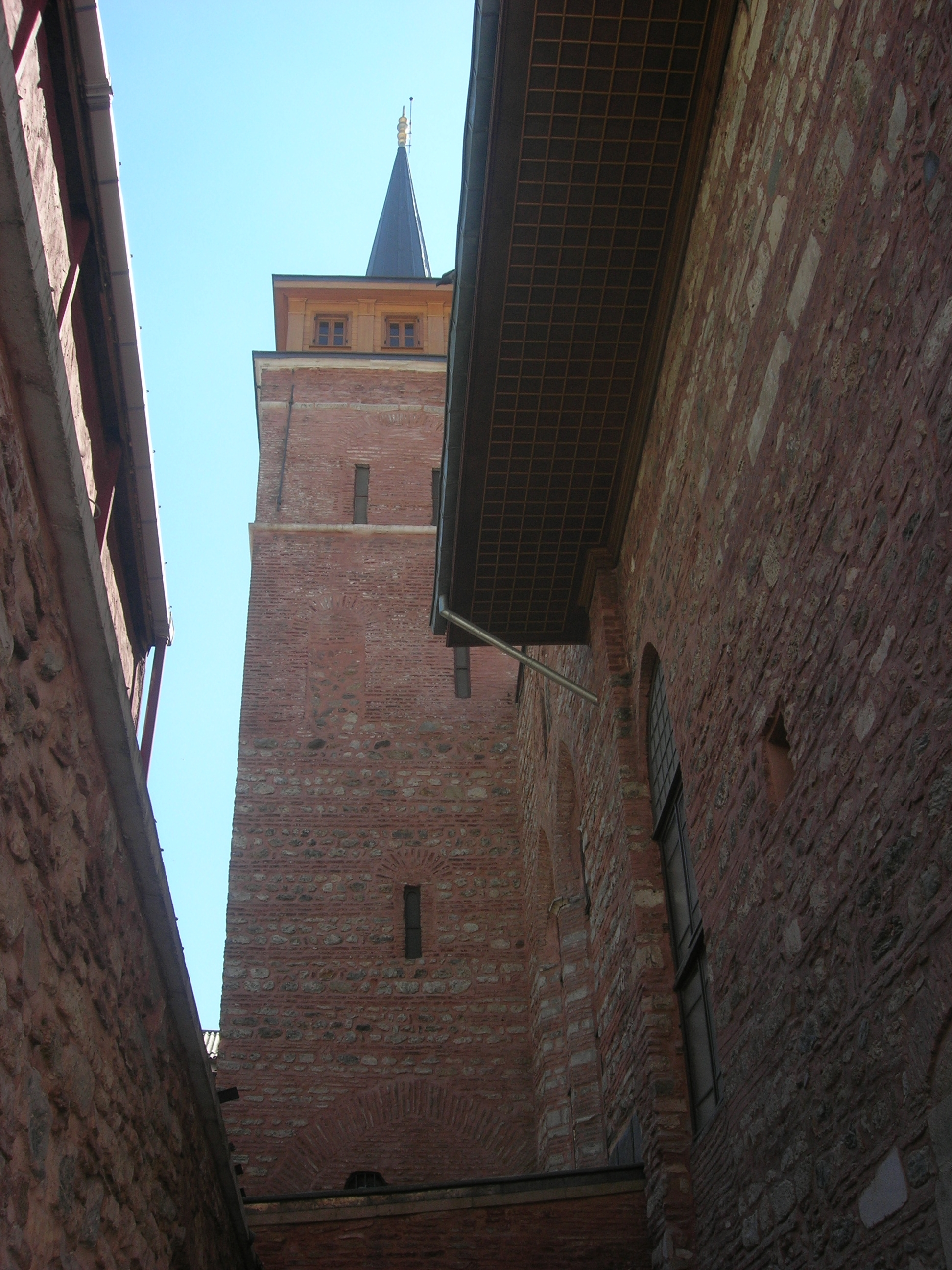
Another view of the minaret through the courtyard

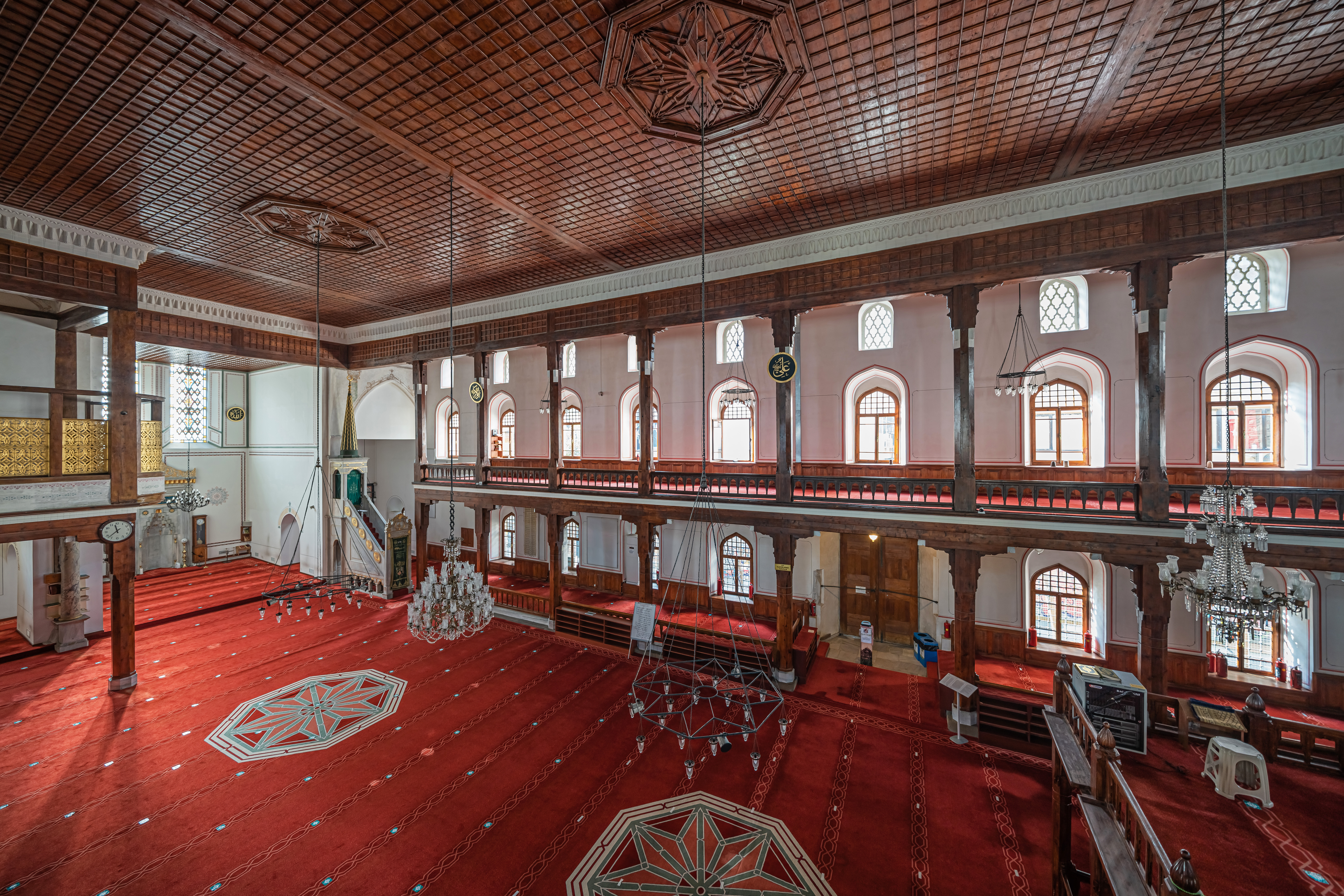
Interior of the mosque

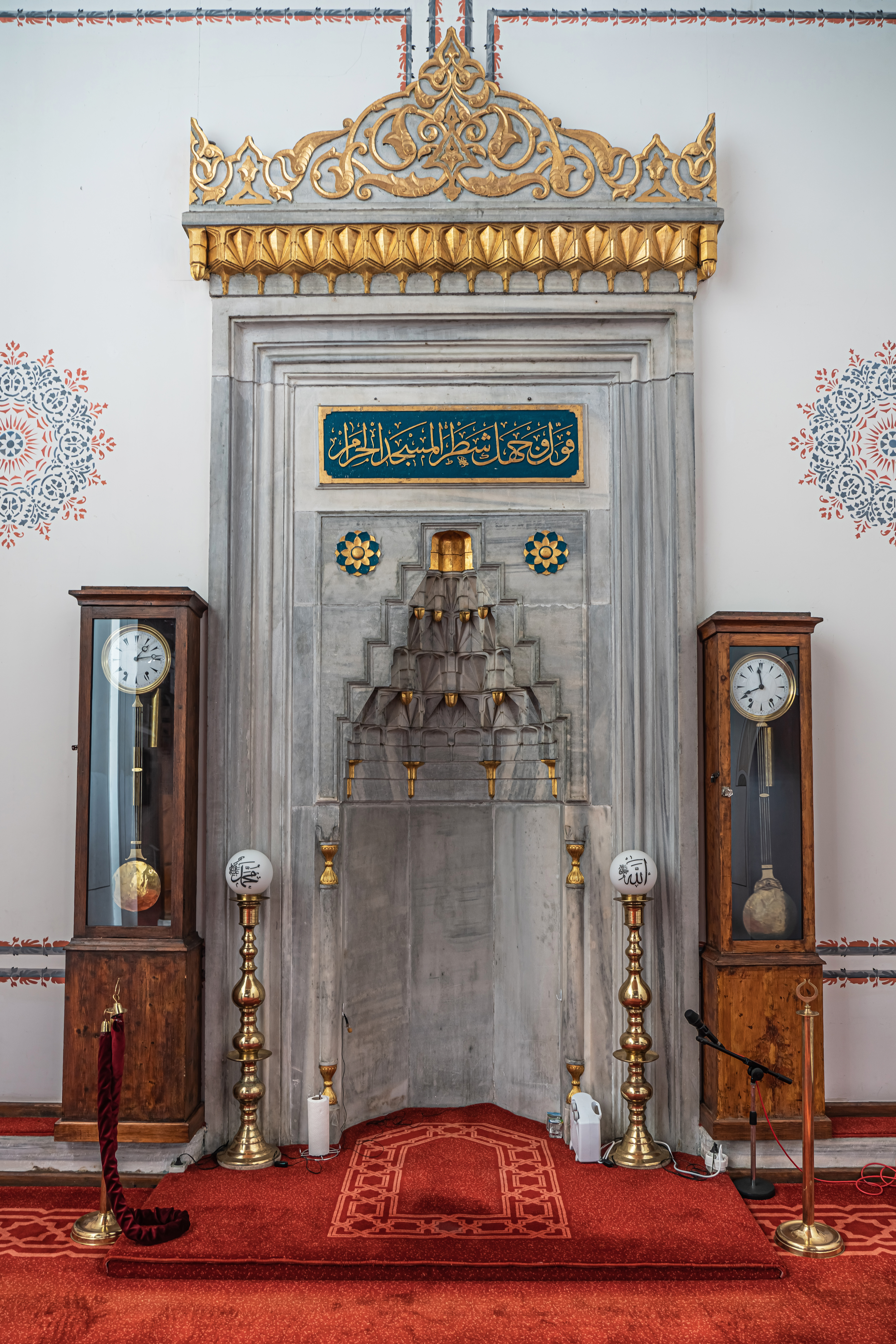
The mihrab

== Sources ==
- Canard, Marius (1926). "Les expéditions des Arabes contre Constantinople dans l'histoire et dans la légende". Journal Asiatique (in French) (208): 61–121. ISSN 0021-762X.
- Janin, Raymond (1953). La Géographie Ecclésiastique de l'Empire Byzantin. 1. Part: Le Siège de Constantinople et le Patriarcat Oecuménique. 3rd Vol. : Les Églises et les Monastères (in French). Paris: Institut Français d'Etudes Byzantines.
- Eyice, Semavi (1955). Istanbul. Petite Guide a travers les Monuments Byzantins et Turcs (in French). Istanbul: Istanbul Matbaası.
- Gülersoy, Çelik (1976). A Guide to Istanbul. Istanbul: Istanbul Kitaplığı. OCLC 3849706.
- Hasluck, F. W. (1929). "LVII. The Mosques of the Arabs in Constantinople". Christianity and Islam Under the Sultans, Volume 2. Oxford, United Kingdom: Clarendon Press. pp. 717–735.
- Mamboury, Ernest (1953). The Tourists' Istanbul. Istanbul: Çituri Biraderler Basımevi.
- Mordtmann, J. H. (1986). "(al-)Ḳusṭanṭīniyya". The Encyclopedia of Islam, New Edition, Volume V: Khe–Mahi. Leiden and New York: BRILL. pp. 532–534. ISBN 90-04-07819-3.
- Müller-Wiener, Wolfgang (1977). Bildlexikon zur Topographie Istanbuls: Byzantion, Konstantinupolis, Istanbul bis zum Beginn d. 17 Jh (in German). Tübingen: Wasmuth. ISBN 978-3-8030-1022-3.
