= Genoese Palace =

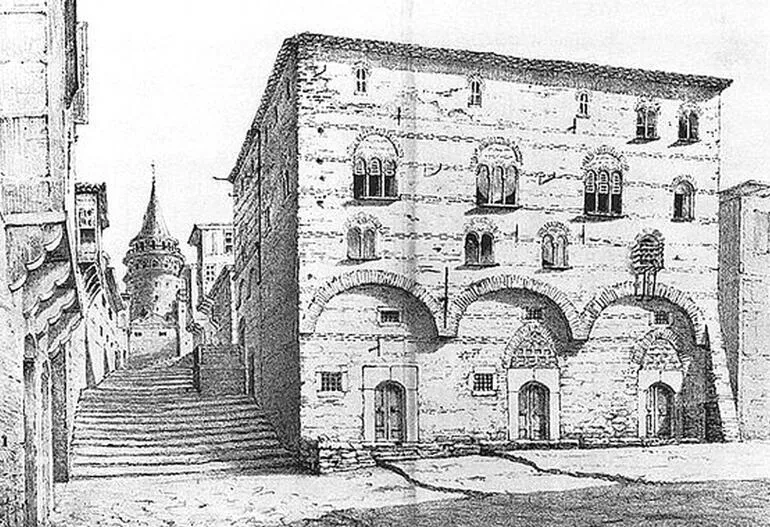
The Genoese Palace (1314) in the foreground, with the Galata Tower (1348) in the background

The Genoese Palace (Turkish: Ceneviz Sarayı; Italian: Palazzo del Comune, lit. 'Palace of the Commune'), alternatively known as the Palace of the Podestà (Turkish: Podesta Sarayı), is a medieval palace in Galata (the modern Karaköy quarter in the Beyoğlu district of Istanbul), which was a colony of the Republic of Genoa between 1273 and 1453.

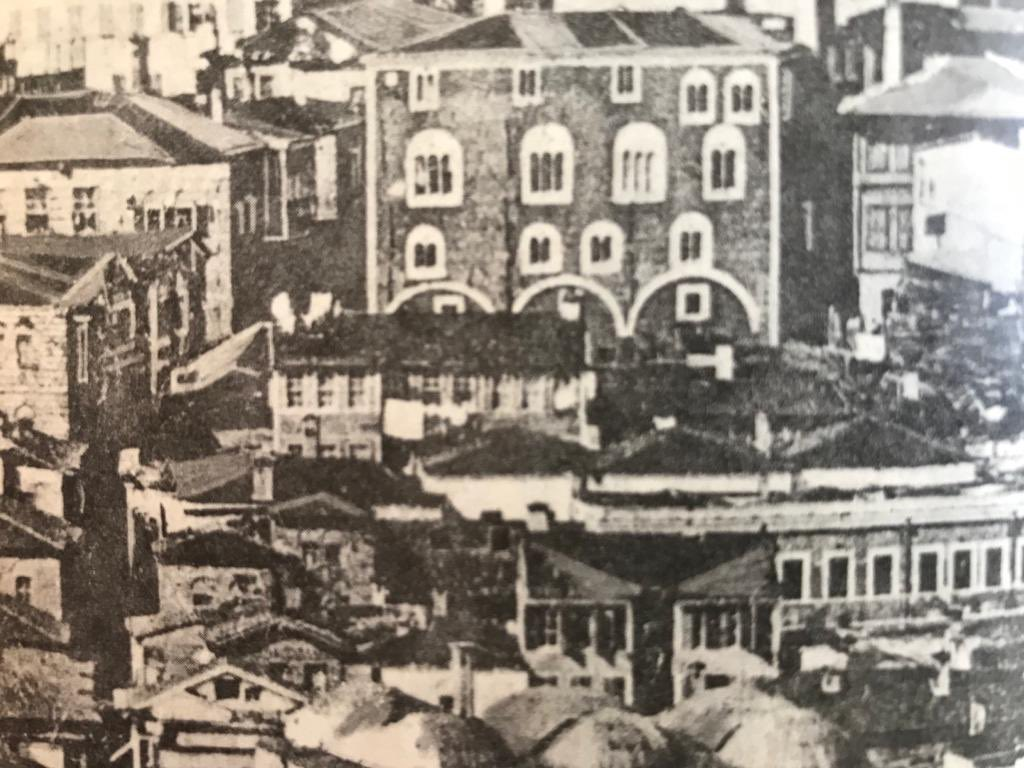
The Genoese Palace before its front facade on Bankalar Caddesi was rebuilt with a different style in the 1880s and became known as the Bereket Han office building.

It was built in 1314 (damaged by fire in 1315 and repaired in 1316) by Montano De Marini, the Podestà of Galata. In terms of design it was modeled after the 13th-century wing of the Palazzo San Giorgio in Genoa, Italy.

The building's appearance remained largely unchanged until 1880, when its front (southern) facade on Bankalar Caddesi (facing the Golden Horn), together with about two-thirds of the building, was demolished for constructing the street's tramway line. The front facade was later reconstructed in the 1880s with a different style and became a 5-floor office building named Bereket Han, while its rear (northern) facade on Kart Çınar Street (and the remaining one-third of the palace building) has retained the materials and design of the original structure, but needs restoration.

It is a short walk to the left (west) of the Camondo Steps, on Kart Çınar Street, which was historically known as the Rue Camondo in the 19th and early 20th centuries.

In 2021 the Genoese coat-of-arms of Luchino De Fazio, the Podestà of Pera (dating from c. 1446–1447), on the building's surviving rear facade on Kart Çınar Street, was stolen.

In 2022 the building was put up for sale after years of neglect.
