= Achille Duchêne =

French garden designer (1866–1947)

Achille Duchêne (1 November 1866 – 12 November 1947) was a French garden designer who worked in the grand manner established by André Le Nôtre. The son of the landscaper Henri Duchêne, Achille Duchêne was the garden designer most in demand among high French society at the turn of the 20th century. He built up a large office to handle the practice, which was responsible over a period of years for some six thousand gardens in France and worldwide.

Among the more notable commissions:

- Château de Vaux-le-Vicomte for Alfred Sommier
- Carolands, for Harriett Pullman Carolan in Hillsborough, California, US
- Château de Champs, Champs-sur-Marne, for Comte Louis Cahen d'Anvers
- Château de Courances, for the marquise Jean de Ganay
- Château du Marais, for comte Boni de Castellane (1903–1906)
- Château de Breteuil (Yvelines) (with his father Henri Duchêne)
- Château de Rosny-sur-Seine (Yvelines), for Paul Lebaudy (end of the 19th century)
- Château de Voisins at Saint-Hilarion (Yvelines), for Comte Edmond de Fels
- Water parterres of Blenheim Palace for the ninth Duke of Marlborough
- Château de Langeais
- Château de Sassy (Boischampré), about 1925, for Gaston d'Audiffret
- Garden of the Hôtel Porgès, 18 avenue Montaigne, Paris 8e, for Jules Porgès
- Gardens of the Palais Rose, avenue Foch, for Boni de Castellane
- Nordkirchen Schlossgarten, Nordkirchen, Germany
- Château de la Verrerie (Le Creusot), for the Schneider family (1904–1908)
- Garden at the Cloître de l'Abbaye de Royaumont (1912)
- The Errázuriz Palace, the private residence of Josefina de Alvear and Matias Errázuriz, in Buenos Aires, Argentina (1914), now the National Museum of Decorative Arts.
- The Bosch Palace, the private residence of Elisa de Alvear and Ernesto Bosch, in Buenos Aires, Argentina (1915)
- Park of Schoppenwihr at Ostheim (Haut-Rhin), garden restoration for Général Baron de Berckheim
- Gardens of Eijsden Castle (around 1900), near Maastricht, the Netherlands
- Mikes kastély, Zabola Estate, Transylvania, Romania, general plan for Count Armin Mikes

In 1935, Duchêne published Les jardins de l'avenir, in which he affirmed that there was no future for grand aristocratic parks and that for the future one must think in terms of simplified maintenance in reduced scale.

== See also ==
- Landscape architecture
