= Léon-Adolphe Amette =

French Catholic cardinal (1850–1920)

His Eminence Léon-Adolphe Amette
- Cardinal, Archbishop of Paris
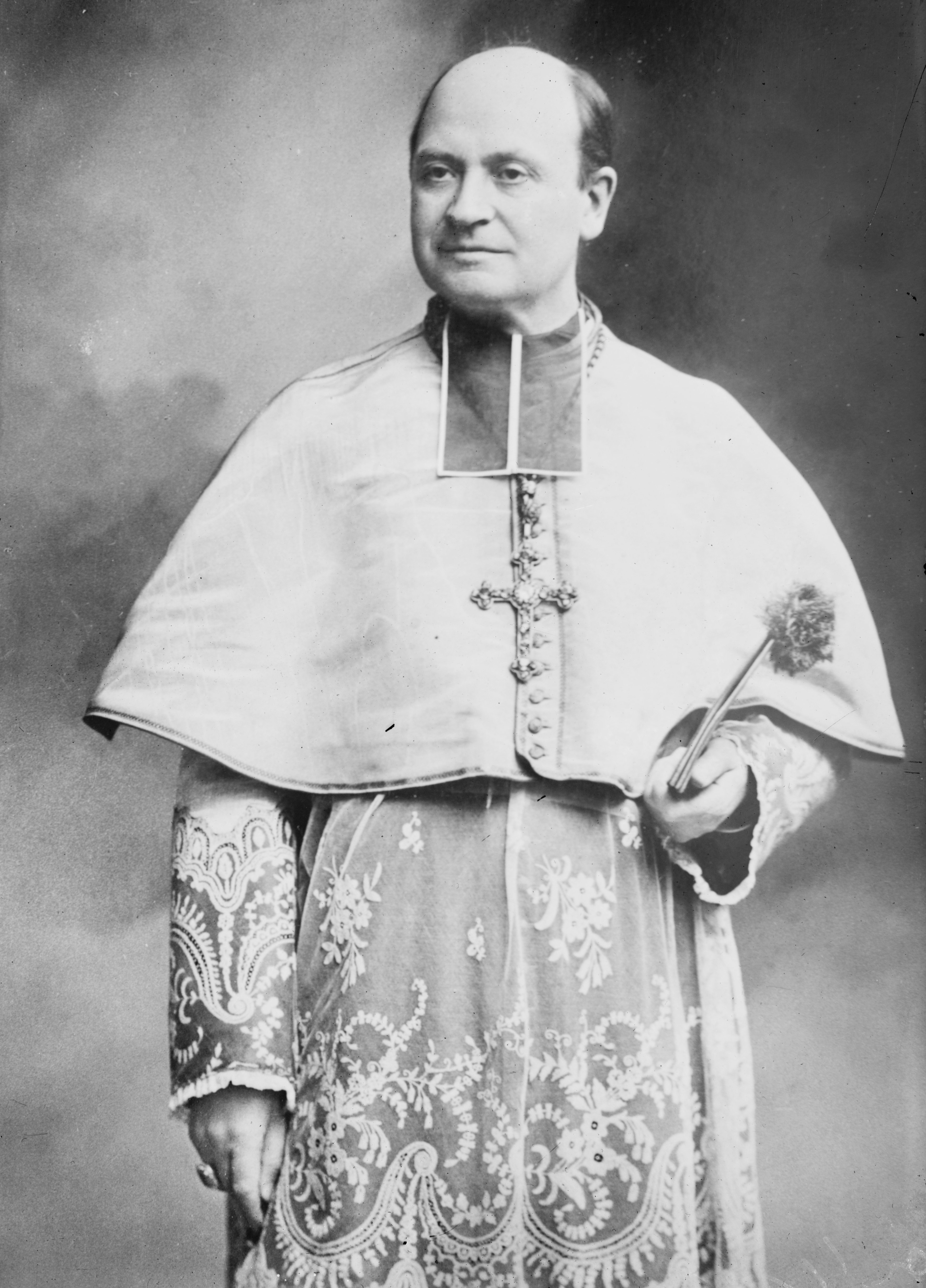
- Cardinal Amette in 1913
- Church: Catholic Church
- Archdiocese: Paris
- Installed: 28 January 1908
- Term ended: 29 August 1920
- Predecessor: François-Marie-Benjamin Richard
- Successor: Louis-Ernest Dubois
- Other post: Cardinal-Priest of Santa Sabina
- Previous posts: Bishop of Bayeux (1898–1906); Coadjutor Archbishop of Paris (1906–1908)

Orders
- Ordination: 20 December 1873 by Joseph-Hippolyte Guibert
- Consecration: 25 January 1899 by Guillaume-Marie-Romain Sourrieu
- Created cardinal: 27 November 1911 by Pius X
- Rank: Cardinal-Priest

Personal details
- Born: 6 September 1850 Douville-sur-Andelle, France
- Died: 29 August 1920 (aged 69) Paris, France
- Buried: Notre-Dame de Paris
- Motto: Vivere Christus Est
- Coat of arms

Styles of Léon-Adolphe Amette
- Reference style: His Eminence
- Spoken style: Your Eminence
- Informal style: Cardinal
- See: Paris

Léon-Adolphe Amette (French: [leɔ̃ adɔlf amɛt]; 6 September 1850 – 29 August 1920) was a French Catholic cardinal who was archbishop of Paris from 1908 to 1920.

He was made a cardinal in 1911 with the rank of Cardinal-Priest of S. Sabina. He participated in the 1914 papal conclave which elected Pope Benedict XV. He consecrated the Basilique du Sacré-Coeur in 1919.

Catholic Church titles
Preceded by François-Marie-Benjamin Richard de la Vergne	Archbishop of Paris; 1908–1920	Succeeded by Louis-Ernest Dubois
