= Musée Branly =

The Musée Branly can refer to either of two museums in Paris:

- Musée du quai Branly, an art museum
- Musée Edouard Branly, the laboratory of radio pioneer Edouard Branly

== See also ==
- List of museums in Paris
