= Maurice Le Sage d'Hauteroche d'Hulst =

French Roman Catholic priest, writer and orator

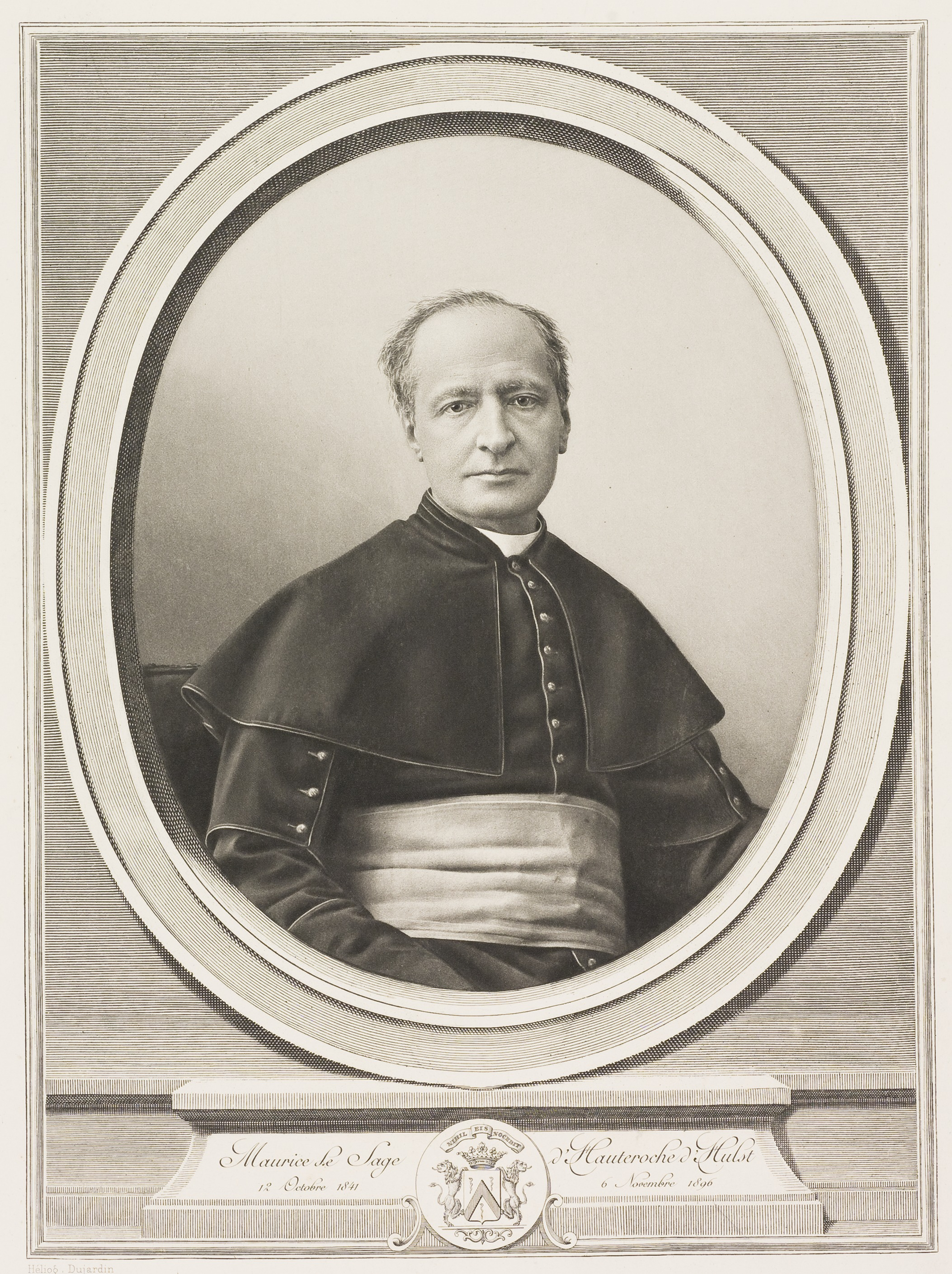
Maurice Le Sage d'Hauteroche d'Hulst.

Maurice Le Sage d'Hauteroche d'Hulst (born at Paris, 10 October 1841; died there, 6 November 1896) was a French Roman Catholic priest, writer, and orator. He was the founder of the Institut Catholique de Paris.

== Life ==
After a course in the Collège Stanislas, d'Hulst entered the seminary of Saint-Sulpice and later proceeded to Rome to finish his ecclesiastical studies. There he obtained the doctorate in divinity.

On his return, d'Hulst was for some time employed on the mission as curate in the populous parish of St. Ambrose. During the war of 1870 he became a volunteer chaplain in the army. In 1873 Cardinal Guibert called him to take part in the administration of the diocese, but he was engaged principally in founding and organizing the free Catholic University (then the Université Catholique de Paris), which the bishops opened at Paris after the passage of the law of 12 July 1875, allowing liberty of higher education. He became its rector in 1880 and for fifteen years devoted himself to developing it in every branch of learning.

In 1891, d'Hulst succeeded Jacques-Marie-Louis Monsabré in the pulpit of Notre-Dame de Paris and preached the Lenten conferences there for six successive years, on the bases of Christian morality and the Decalogue. In 1892 he was elected deputy for Finistère on the death of Charles-Émile Freppel.

He died while still active, after a short illness.

== Works ==
Books by d'Hulst include:

- Vie de la Mère Marie-Thérèse (Paris, 1872)
- Vie de Just de Bretenières (Paris, 1892)
- L'éducation supérieure (Paris, 1886)
- Le Droit chrétien et le Droit moderne, a commentary on the Encyclical "Immortale" of Leo XIII (Paris, 1886)
- a volume of Mélanges philosophiques (2nd ed., 1903)
- the two-volume Mélanges oratoires (Paris, 1891 and 1892)
- the six-volume Conférences de Notre-Dame (Paris, 1891–96).

He also wrote a number of articles, including:

- Examen de conscience de Renan
- Une Ame royale et chrétienne (a necrology of the Comte de Paris)
- La Question biblique

Most of his occasional discourses were collected and published by Henri Louis Odelin in the four volumes entitled Nouveaux Mélanges oratoires (Paris, 1900–07). Alfred Baudrillart, his successor at the head of the Catholic University, after the rectorship of Pierre-Louis Péchenard, published a collection of Lettres de Direction of d'Hulst.
