= Cardinal Dubois =

Cardinal Dubois may refer to:

- Guillaume Dubois (1656–1723), Archbishop of Cambrai and French statesman
- Louis-Ernest Dubois (1856–1929), Archbishop of Paris
