= Alfred Baudrillart =

French prelate

His Eminence Alfred-Henri-Marie Baudrillart
- Cardinal, Rector of the Institut catholique de Paris
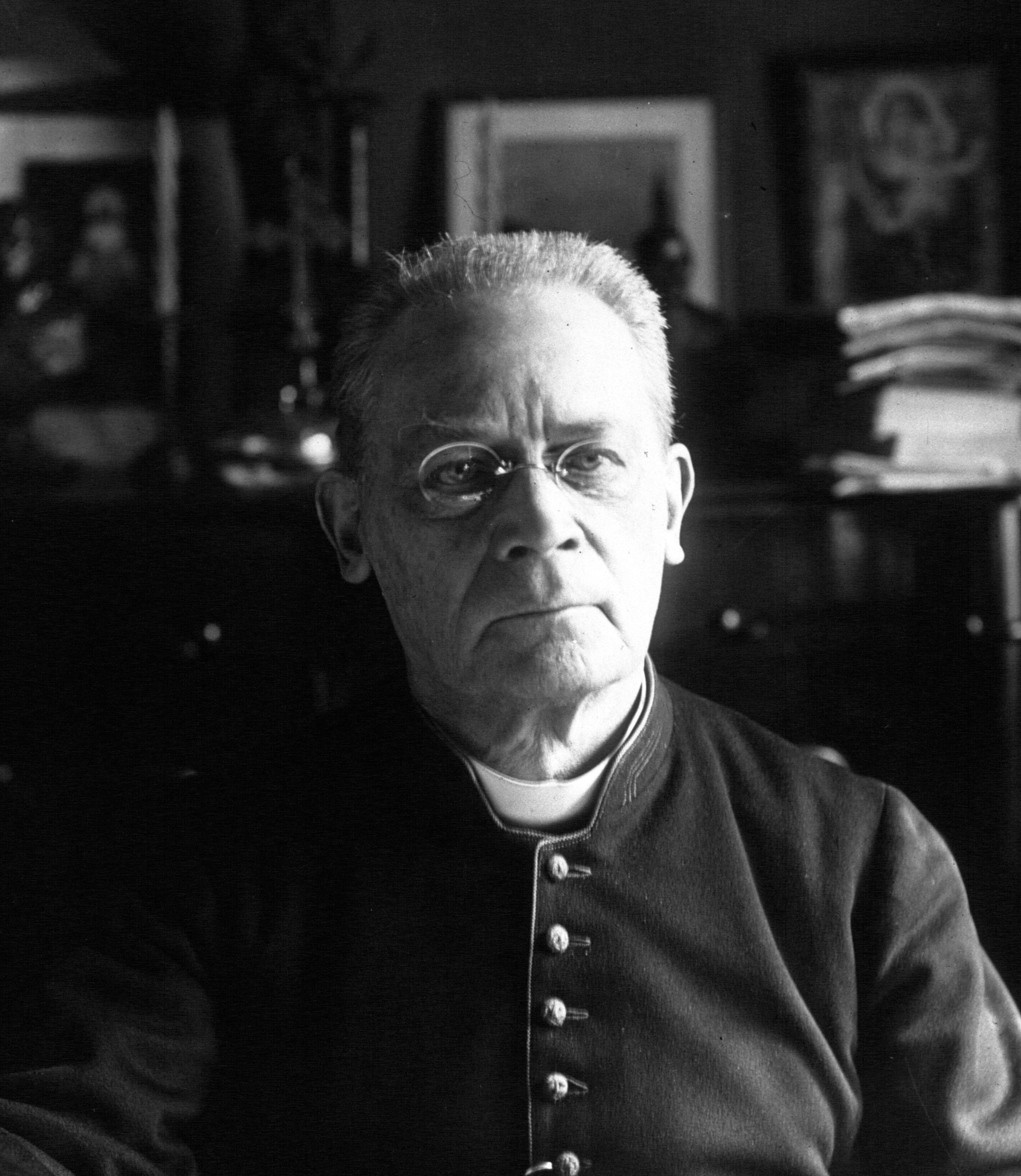
- Alfred Baudrillart in 1918
- Church: Roman Catholic

Orders
- Ordination: 9 July 1893
- Consecration: 28 October 1921
- Created cardinal: 16 December 1935 by Pope Pius XI

Personal details
- Born: 6 January 1859 Paris
- Died: 19 May 1942 (aged 83) Paris
- Buried: Institut Catholique de Paris
- Denomination: Roman Catholic
- Profession: Cardinal, academician, historian; member of the Académie française
- Education: Collège Louis-le-Grand

Alfred-Henri-Marie Baudrillart, Orat. (6 January 1859 – 19 May 1942) was a French prelate of the Catholic Church, who became a cardinal in 1935. A historian and writer, he served as Rector of the Institut Catholique de Paris from 1907 until his death. He campaigned to rouse international support for France during the First World War, while in the Second World War he supported the Vichy regime and openly collaborated with Nazi Germany.

== Biography ==
Baudrillart was born in Paris, to Henri Baudrillart and Marie Sacy. His father was professor of political economy at Collège de France, editor in chief of the Journal des Économistes, and a member of Académie des Sciences Morales et Politiques. Baudrillart's maternal grandfather, Samuel Ustazade de Sacy, was redactor in chief of the Journal des débats and a member of the Académie française.

Raised in the Latin Quarter, Baudrillart entered École Bossuet in 1868, and later the Collège Louis le Grand. In 1876, at the age of seventeen, he decided to pursue a career in the Church. He attended the École Normale Supérieure from 1878 to 1881, where his classmates included Jean Jaurès and Henri Bergson. He earned his doctorate with a thesis entitled Philippe V et la Cour de France and earned a theology degree as well. He taught at several schools, including the Collège Stanislas de Paris.

Baudrillart joined the Oratory of St. Philip of Neri in 1890. He was ordained to the priesthood in Paris on 9 July 1893, at the relatively late age of 34. He then served as professor of history at the Institut Catholique from 1894 to 1907, when he was named its rector; he held this position until his death thirty-five years later. Founding the Revue practique d'apologétique in 1905, he was the director of Bulletin critique from 1898 to 1908, having previously served as a collaborator from 1891 to 1897. Baudrillart served as General Assistant of the Oratorians from 1898 to 1908, and again from 1919 to 1921.

He was a "ferocious opponent" (farouche adversaire) of "modernism", a complex of ideas and social developments that the Catholic Church identified broadly as historicism, secularism, and rationalism, and which Baudrillart identified with the bishops of Germany and their resistance to the teaching of Pope Pius X in his encyclical denouncing modernism, Pascendi dominici gregis (1907).

Baudrillart was an ardent supporter of France in the First World War and promoted its cause internationally. He founded the Comité catholique de propagande française à l'étranger and reached an audience of 15 million with articles written for publication in U.S. newspapers. He also gave lectures in Spain and the U.S. In May 1917, he rejected a peace overture from Matthias Erzberger of the German Catholic Centre Party because he thought it wrong for Catholics or any other group to act in the place of the lawful government.

Baudrillart was made an honorary canon of the metropolitan cathedral chapter of Paris in 1906, and a Domestic prelate of His Holiness on 17 April 1907. On 10 October 1908, he became Vicar General of Paris.

He was elected as a member of the Académie française, like his grandfather, on 2 May 1918.

Styles of Alfred-Henri-Marie Baudrillart
- Reference style: His Eminence
- Spoken style: Your Eminence
- Informal style: Cardinal
- See: Archbishop of Paris

On 29 July 1921, Baudrillart was appointed Titular Bishop of Hemeria by Pope Benedict XV. He received his episcopal consecration on the following 28 October in the Institut's Église des Carmes from Cardinal Louis-Ernest Dubois, with Bishops Stanislas Touchet and Joseph-Marie Tissier serving as co-consecrators. Baudrillart was later advanced to Titular Archbishop of Melitene on 12 April 1928.

On a visit to a francophone conference in Canada in 1927, he imagined in his diaries the future of an independent French state in North America. During his visit to New York on that trip, The New York Times called him "one of the best known bishops in the world".

Pope Pius XI created him Cardinal Priest of S. Bernardo alle Terme in the consistory of 16 December 1935. Baudrillart was one of the cardinal electors in the 1939 papal conclave, which elected Pope Pius XII. Pius was close friends with General Maurice Gamelin, whom Baudrillart had once taught.

Baudrillart supported the Vichy government of Marshal Philippe Pétain, issuing a statement titled Choisir, vouloir, obéir (Choose, desire, obey) on 20 November 1940, which shocked his colleagues and veterans of the First World War. In August 1941, as a fervent anti-communist, he endorsed the formation of a Legion of French Volunteers Against Bolshevism to fight alongside the Germans. He was a member of the Legion's Honorary Committee of Sponsors, and his views, according to his diary, were influenced by meetings with Kurt Reichl, an Austrian Catholic, German officer, and Nazi counter-intelligence agent. His endorsement of the Legion said:

Priest and French, how can I, in a moment so decisive, refuse to approve the common noble enterprise directed by Germany, dedicated to liberate Russia from the bonds that have held it for the last twenty-five years, suffocating its old human and Christian traditions, to free France, Europe, and the world from the most pernicious and most sanguinary monster that mankind has ever known, to raise the peoples above their narrow interests, and to establish among them a holy fraternity revived from the time of the Christian Middle Ages?

Baudrillart died in Paris on 19 May 1942 at the age of 83. He was interred in the Église des Carmes at the Institut Catholique.

== Writings ==
History

- Madame de Maintenon (1882)
- Présentations de Philippe V à la Couronne de France (1887)
- Rapport sur une mission en Espagne aux archives d'Alcale de Henares et de Simancas (1889)
- Philippe V et la Cour de France, 5 vol. (1889-1901)
- De cardinalis Quirini vita et operibus (1889)
- Comment et pourquoi la France est restée catholique au XVIe siècle? (1895)
- Les Normaliens dans l'Église (1895)
- La France chrétienne dans l'histoire (1896)
- Le renouvellement intellectuel du clergé de France au XIXe siècle (1903)
- L'Église catholique, la Renaissance, le Protestantisme (1904)
- Lettres du duc de Bourgogne au roi d'Espagne Philippe V et à la reine, 2 vol. (1912)
- Benoît XV (1920)
- La Très Vénérable Camille de Soyecourt ou Celle qui n'a pas eu peur (1941)

Other non-fiction

- Quatre cents ans de concordat (1905)
- Les universités catholiques de France et de l'étranger (1909)
- L'enseignement catholique dans la France contemporaine (1910)
- La vie de Mgr d'Hulst (1912), founder of the Institut catholique
- Frédéric Ozanam (1912), a founder of the Society of Saint Vincent de Paul
- Soldats et étudiants catholiques (1914)
- La guerre allemande et le catholicisme (1915)
- Une campagne française (1917)
- L'Allemagne et les Alliés devant la conscience chrétienne (1917)
- L'effort canadien (1917)
- Lettres d'un pèlerin français au Levant et en Terre Sainte (1924)
- L'activité missionnaire de l'Église à travers les âges (1927)
- Mœurs païennes, mœurs chrétiennes (1930)
- L'Institut catholique (1930)
- La vocation de la France (1934)
- La voix du chef (1941)

Memoirs

- Vingt-cinq ans de rectorat. L'Institut catholique de Paris, 1907-1932 (1932)
- Paul Christophe, editor, Les carnets du cardinal Baudrillart, 9 volumes (Paris: Editions du Cerf), 1994–1999, ISBN 9782204071130
