= François-Marie-Benjamin Richard =

French cardinal (1819–1908)

Servant of God François-Marie-Benjamin Richard
- Cardinal; Archbishop of Paris
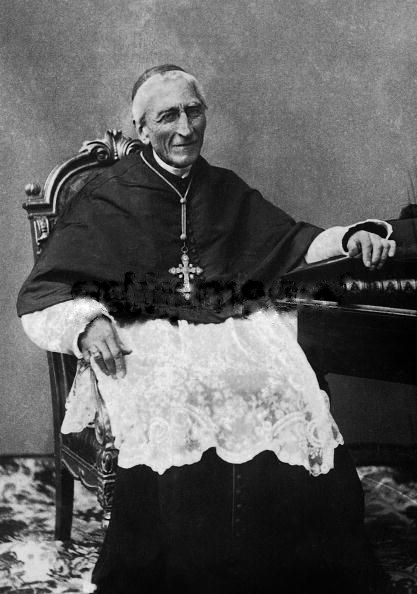
- Church: Roman Catholic Church
- Archdiocese: Paris
- Metropolis: Paris
- See: Paris
- Installed: 8 July 1886
- Term ended: 28 January 1908
- Predecessor: Joseph-Hippolyte Guibert
- Successor: Léon-Adolphe Amette
- Other post: Cardinal-Priest of Santa Maria in Via (1889–1908)
- Previous posts: Vicar-General of Nantes (1850–1869); Bishop of Belley (1871–1875); Coadjutor Archbishop of Paris (1875–1886); Titular Archbishop of Larissa in Thessalia (1875–1889)

Orders
- Ordination: 21 December 1844 by Denis Auguste Affre
- Consecration: 11 February 1872 by Joseph-Hippolyte Guibert
- Created cardinal: 24 May 1889 by Pope Leo XIII
- Rank: Cardinal-Priest

Personal details
- Born: François-Marie-Benjamin Richard; 1 March 1819 Nantes, France
- Died: 28 January 1908 (aged 88) Paris, France
- Buried: Notre Dame de Paris
- Motto: Faites sur toutes choses que Dieu soyt le mieux aymé
- Coat of arms

François-Marie-Benjamin Richard de la Vergne (French: [fʁɑ̃swa maʁi bɛ̃ʒamɛ̃ ʁiʃaʁ dəla vɛʁɲ]; 1 March 1819 – 27 January 1908) was a French cardinal of the Roman Catholic Church and served as the Archbishop of Paris.

His cause of beatification has commenced and he has the title of Servant of God.

== Biography ==
=== Early life and priesthood ===
François-Marie-Benjamin Richard was born in 1819 in Nantes and was one of eleven children.

Richard was educated at the seminary of St Sulpice where he studied theology from October 1841. He was ordained to the priesthood on 21 December 1844 by the Archbishop of Paris Denis Auguste Affre. He served as a parish priest from 1845 to 1846 before he was sent to Rome for further studies that spanned from 1846 to 1849. He was later made the Vicar-General of Nantes on 1 August 1850 and occupied that post until 1869.

=== Episcopate ===
Pope Pius IX appointed Richard as the Bishop of Belley on 22 December 1871. He received episcopal consecration on 11 February 1872 in Paris. Later, in 1875, he was appointed Titular Archbishop of Larissa and Coadjutor of Paris. In 1886 the death of Cardinal Guibert was followed by Richard's succession to the see of Paris.

=== Cardinalate and death ===
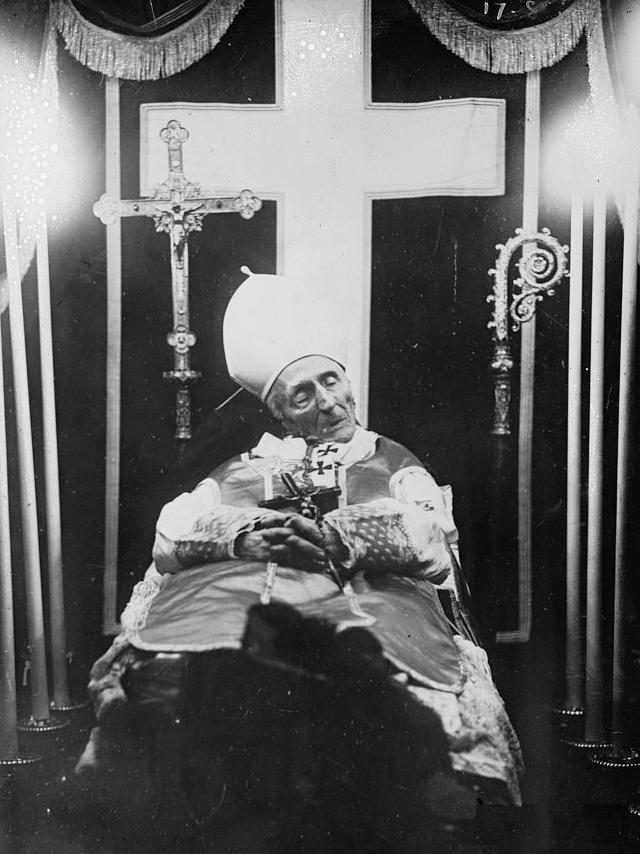
The cardinal lying in state in 1908.

Pope Leo XIII elevated him into the cardinalate on 24 May 1889 as the Cardinal-Priest of Santa Maria in Via.

In January 1900 the trial of the Assumptionist Fathers resulted in the dissolution of their society as an illegal association. The next day an official visit of the archbishop to the fathers was noted by the government as an act of a political character and Richard was officially censured. His attitude was in general exceedingly moderate, he had no share in the extremist policy of the Ultramontanes, and throughout the struggle over the law of Associations and the law of Separations he maintained his reasonable temper.

Richard participated in the papal conclave of 1903 that saw the election of Pope Pius X.

He presided in September 1906 over an assembly of bishops and archbishops at his palace in the rue de Grenelle, a few days after the papal encyclical forbidding French Catholics to form associations for public worship, but it was then too late for conciliation. In December he gave up the archiepiscopal palace to the government authorities. He was then an old man of nearly ninety, and his eviction evoked great sympathy.

Richard died in 1908 of congestion of the lungs and was buried in the cathedral of Notre Dame.

== Beatification process ==
A cause for Richard's beatification was opened, granting him the title of Servant of God. His spiritual writings were approved by theologians on 22 May 1935.

Catholic Church titles
Preceded by Joseph-Hippolyte Guibert	Archbishop of Paris; 1886–1908	Succeeded by Léon-Adolphe Amette
Records
Preceded by Michelangelo Celesia	Oldest living Member of the Sacred College; 14 April 1904 – 28 January 1908	Succeeded by Anton Josef Gruscha
