= San Gregorio, Argentina =

San Gregorio
- City
- Location of San Gregorio in Argentina
- Coordinates: 34°19′31″S 62°02′19″W
- Country: Argentina
- Province: Santa Fe
- Department: General López
- Established: March 1, 1893
- Founder: Josefina Alvear de Rodríguez

Area
  - Total: 519 km^{2} (200 sq mi)
- Elevation: 100 m (330 ft)

Population (2010 census)
  - Total: 5,543
  - Density: 10.7/km^{2} (27.7/sq mi)
- Time zone: UTC−3 (ART)
- CPA base: S2728
- Dialing code: +54 3382

San Gregorio is a town located in the General López Department in the province of Santa Fe, Argentina.

== History ==
San Gregorio was founded on March 1, 1893 by Josefina de Alvear, who inherited the land, which at the time was an estancia, from her husband's father. The town was named in honor of her deceased husband. San Gregorio was initially laid out with 136 blocks, alongside land reserved for a church. De Alvear died in 1935.

== Economy ==
The town sees a significant amount of tourism from fishing, which has, in recent years, come under threat due to droughts.

== Population ==
According to INDEC, which collects population data for the country, the town had a population of 5,543 people as of the 2022 census.
