= Rue d'Assas =

Street in Paris, France

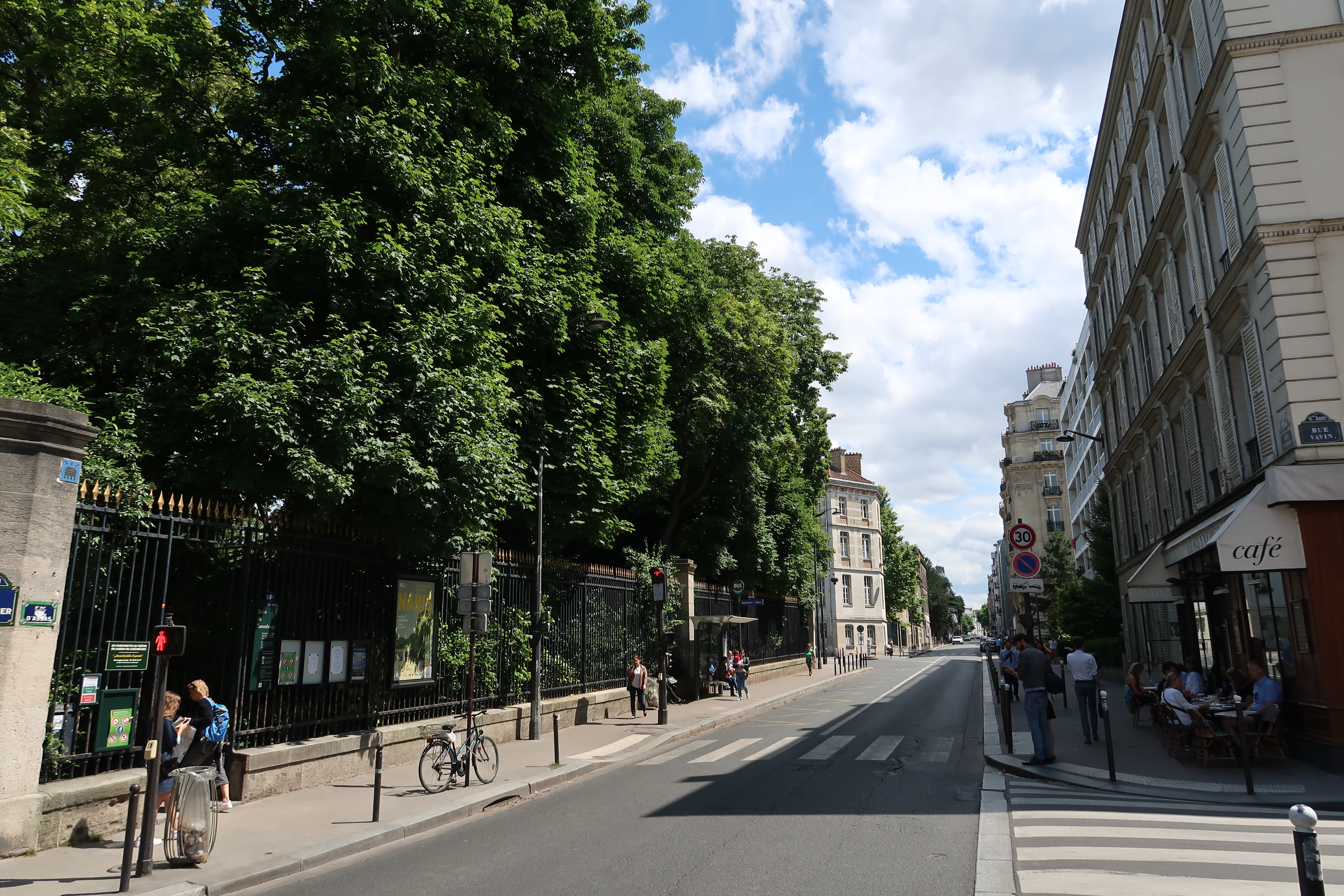
- Rue d'Assas

- Location within Paris
- Length: 1,190 m (3,900 ft)
- Width: 15 m (49 ft)
- Arrondissement: 6th
- Quarter: Notre-Dame-des-Champs, Odéon
- Coordinates: 48°50′43″N 2°19′55″E
- From: 25 bis rue du Cherche-Midi
- To: 12 avenue de l'Observatoire

Construction
- Denomination: Arr. 2 April 1868

The Rue d'Assas (French pronunciation: [ʁy dasas]) is a street in the 6th arrondissement of Paris, named after Nicolas-Louis d'Assas.

== Features ==
- Musée Edouard Branly (at no. 21)
- Musée "Bible et Terre Sainte" (at no. 21)
- Main campus of Panthéon-Assas University (at no. 92)
- Zadkine Museum (at no. 100)
- Jardin du Luxembourg: the Rue d'Assas borders the Jardin between the Rue Guynemer and the Rue Auguste-Comte
- Hélène Darroze's café

== Notable people ==
- Jeanne Baptiste d'Albert de Luynes lived at no. 8.
- Frédéric Auguste Bartholdi, the sculptor of the Statue of Liberty, had his last residence and studio at no. 82.
- Joe Dassin lived at no. 28, from 1968 to 1974.
- Charles Aznavour was born at Tarnier Clinic at no. 89.
- August Strindberg stayed at Hotel Orfila at no. 60-62, while undergoing his 'Inferno crisis'.
