= Catholic University of Paris =

Private Catholic university in Paris

Institut catholique de Paris
- Latin: Universitas Catholica Parisiensis
- Type: Private
- Established: c. 1875
- Founder: Maurice d'Hulst
- Religious affiliation: Catholic Church
- Academic affiliations: Catholic University
- Chancellor: André Vingt-Trois
- Faculty: 750 (university only)
- Students: 10,000
- Location: 74 Rue de Vaugirard, Paris, France; 48°50′53″N 2°19′47″E
- Website: en.icp.fr/english-version

The Institut catholique de Paris (French: [ɛ̃stity katɔlik də paʁi], abbr. ICP), known in English as the Catholic University of Paris (and in Latin as Universitas catholica Parisiensis), is a private university located in Paris, France.

== History: 1875–present ==
The Institut catholique de Paris was founded in 1875, under the name of the Université catholique de Paris by Maurice Le Sage d'Hauteroche d'Hulst.

The school settled on the site of the former convent of the Carmelites, however the premises were not well adapted. Gabriel Ruprich-Robert developed a new project for the site; however, due to a lack of sufficient funds, he decided to renovate some of the old buildings instead of destroying them. The first phase of the renovation took place between 1894 and 1897. Following the French law establishing the separation of the church and state, ownership of the premises was given to the state. In 1927, the premises were repurchased by the institute, allowing the second phase of the renovation to take place between 1929 and 1930, followed by a third phase between 1932 and 1933.

The Neogothlic architectural style is prevalent on the campus.

ICP is a non-for-profit association pursuant to the French Law of 1901, recognized as promoting public interest, in 1941.

The current rector is Bishop Philippe Bordeyne, who has been the rector of ICP since 2011.

In 2017, there were 10,000 students attending ICP. This was also the year that ICP inaugurated its renovated campus.

== Overview ==
The university is known for its liberal theology and offers bachelor, master and doctoral degrees in various faculties. The Faculté de Théologie is a pontifical institution with the canonical authorization to educate men for the Catholic priesthood. The Faculté de Lettres is a school of the humanities with no explicit religious orientation. During the summer, the institute opens the Faculté de Lettres to international students for month-long terms.

Professors at the university are recruited from sacred (i.e., theology, canon law, etc.) and secular disciplines (e.g., literature, philosophy, education, social sciences, economics).

The Institut catholique de Paris belongs to the European Higher Education Area and follows the LMD system. ICP delivers state degrees recognized at the National and European levels (bachelor, master and doctorate degrees), canonical diplomas as well as its own diplomas. The majority of degrees and diplomas awarded by the Catholic University of Paris are state-authorized diplomas, as the university is certified to issue them by the Ministry of Education. Canonical degrees are awarded in the name of the Holy See and are the result of a prescribed course of study in the ecclesiastical faculties, such as theology and canon law.

The university charges tuition, because the state does not pay the wages of professors at Catholic institutions of higher learning, as authorized under the Debré Law of 1959. The institute receives a state subsidy which covers 34% of its financial needs. The amount of the subsidy, derived from the Ministry of National Education, is independently fixed each year by the government within the framework of the national budget, without any obligation or contract of any kind.

The university belongs to the network of the UDESCA (Union of the Catholic Higher Educational Establishments) which includes the five French Catholic institutes - Paris, Lille, Lyon, Angers and Toulouse - and is a member of the International Federation of Catholic Universities (FIUC), comprising 200 Catholic universities throughout the world.

== Campus ==
The premises of ICP are shared between various faculties and schools, and include multiple libraries. They also include a seminary university, the Seminary of Carmes, and a church: Saint-Joseph-des-Carmes.

The Musée Edouard Branly, located within the institute, preserves the laboratory of physics professor and noted radio pioneer Édouard Branly, developer of the first practical radio receiver device, the Branly coherer, who also coined the term "radio". The institute also houses the Bible and Holy Land Museum.

In 2017, the campus was renovated allowing the school to gain 1,000 m^{2} (11,000 sq ft) in additional space, which includes an amphitheater with a capacity for 400 people.

== Libraries ==
The main library, known as Bibliothèque de Fels, is home to 600,000 volumes including 60,000 ancient volumes and 800 manuscripts. The library is mostly due to donations made by Edmond de Fels. Other libraries on campus include the Jean-de-Vernon Library of Theology and Biblical Sciences, the Library of the Faculty of Canon Law which publishes L'Année Canonique (The Canon Year). In addition to the Documentation Center of the Institute of Education, and the Library of the French Institute of Byzantine Studies.

== International ==
Founded in 1948, ILCF (Institute of French Language and Culture) of ICP has offered classes to French language learners for over 60 years. ILCF has been awarded the “Qualité FLE” certification by three public ministries. Ensuring the quality of teaching French as a Foreign Language. ICP has developed mobility partnerships with more than 135 universities in 35 countries.

== Notable alumni ==
=== Cardinals and bishops ===
- Cardinal Jean-Marie Lustiger
- Cardinal Alfred Baudrillart, C.O.
- Cardinal Christoph Schönborn, O.P.
- Cardinal Franc Rode, C.M.
- Major Archbishop Cardinal Mar George Alencherry
- Cardinal André Vingt-Trois
- Cardinal Jean-Marc Aveline
- Archbishop Michael Augustine
- Archbishop Anton Stres, C.M.
- Bishop Robert Barron
- Bishop Savarimuthu Arokiaraj
- Metropolitan Emmanuel of Chalcedon

=== Priests ===
- The Rev. D. S. Amalorpavadass
- The Rev. Matthew Fox
- The Rev. Clarence Rivers
- The Rev. Chris Willcock, S.J.
- Rev. Fr. Baby Varghese, MOSC

=== Other ===
- Simone de Beauvoir
- Charlotte Casiraghi
- Marie Madeleine Davy PhD
- Ruchira Kamboj
- Pierre Pflimlin
- Frederica von Stade
- Audrey Tautou
- Jean Vanier

== Faculties ==
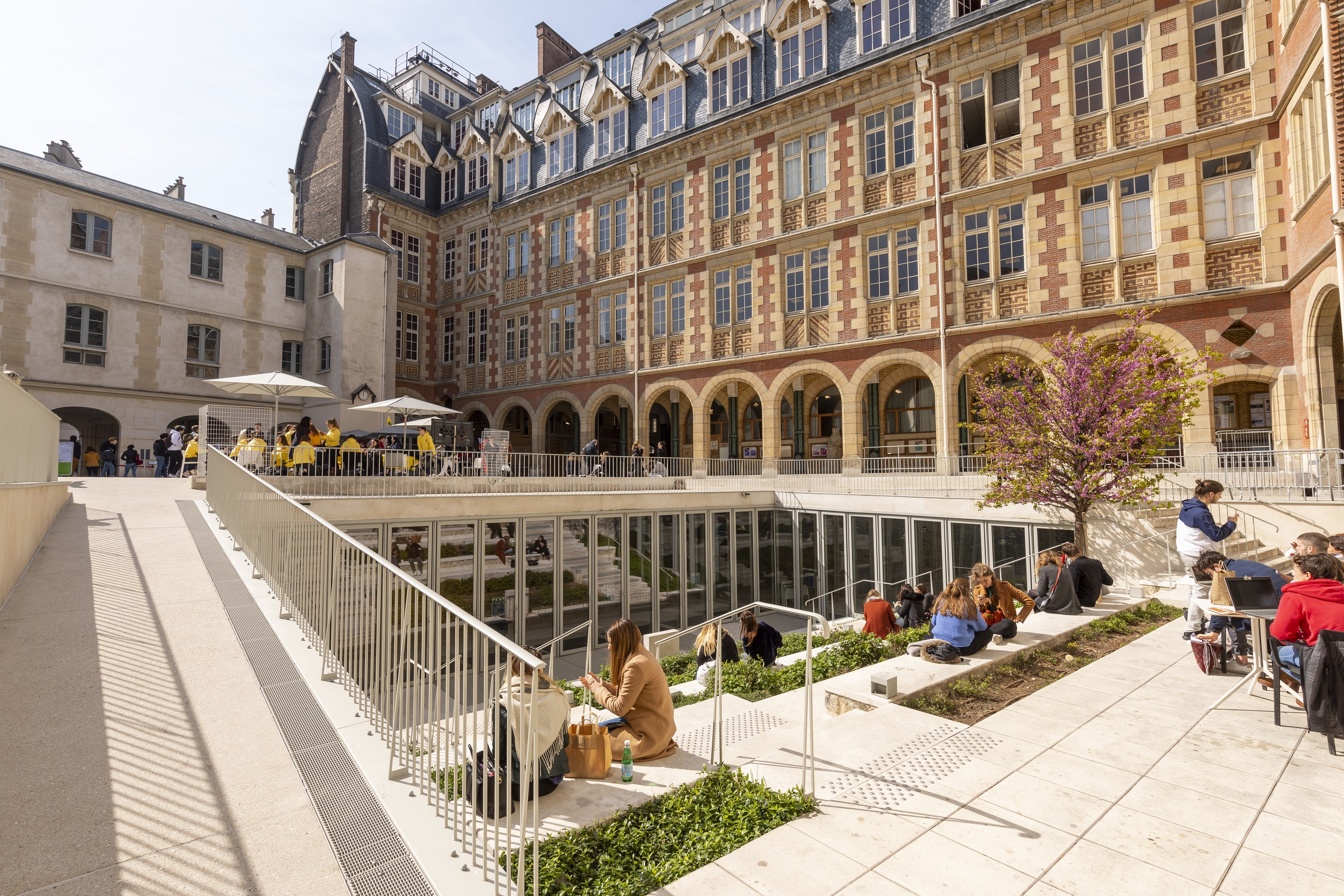
Institut catholique de Paris

- Faculty of Theology
- Faculty of Philosophy
- Faculty of Canon Law
- Faculty of Humanities
  - Literature Department
  - History Department
  - Languages Department
  - History of Arts Department
  - Institute of French Language and Culture (ILCF)
- Faculty of Social Sciences and Economics (FASSE)
  - Department of Economics
  - Department of Law
  - Department of Political Science
  - Department of Sociology
- Faculty of Education

== Schools ==
- School of Librarians and Documentalists (EBD): information management
- School of Practitioners of Psychology (EPP)
- School of Psycho-Pedagogical Training (EFPP): training specialist educators and educators of young children
- Institute of Intercultural Management and Communication (ISIT)
- Pedagogical Training Centre (CFP) E. Mounier, specializing in the teaching profession in schools
- Graduate School of Sports Professions (ILEPS)
- ESSEC group- ESSEC MBA, EPSCI
- School of Electricity, Production and Industrial Methods (EPMI)
- Paris Higher Institute of Electronics (ISEP)
- Graduate School of Organic and Mineral Chemistry (ESCOM)
- LaSalle Beauvais Polytechnic Institute
