= Musée "Bible et Terre Sainte" =

Museum in Paris, France

Coordinates: 48.8482°N 2.3301°E

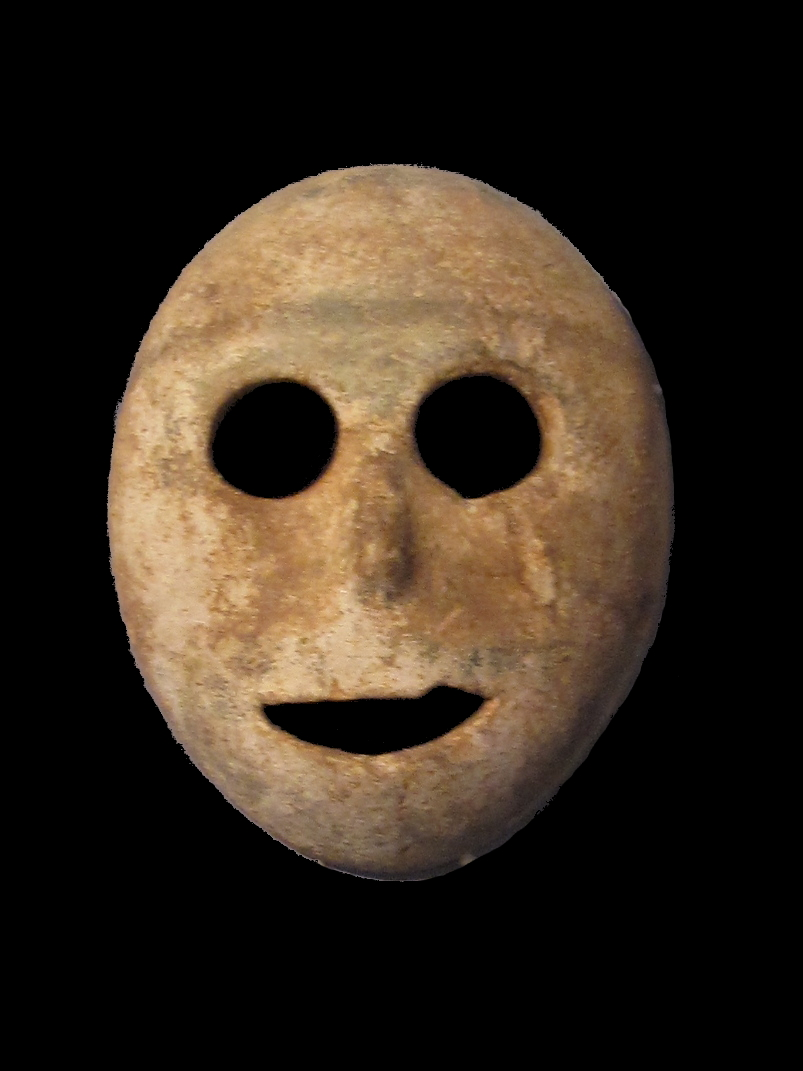
Stone mask in the Musée Biblique purportedly dating the Pre-Pottery Neolithic, c. 7000 BCE.

The Musée Bible et Terre Sainte (French pronunciation: [myze bibl e tɛʁ sɛ̃t], Bible and Holy Land Museum), also known as the Musée Biblique ([myze biblik], Biblical Museum), is a small museum operated by the Institut Catholique de Paris, and located in the 6th arrondissement of Paris, France, at 21 rue d'Assas. It is open Saturday afternoons; admission is free.

== History ==
The museum was established in 1969 by Canon Leconte and Father J. Starcky, and is maintained by the "Bible et Terre Sainte" association. In 1994, it moved to its current premises. Today it contains over 500 cultural objects, arranged in chronological order, representing everyday life in Canaan (also called Israel, Judah, Judea, Syria Palaestina by the Romans, and later Palestine) from 5000 BCE to 600 CE. It is located within the courtyard to the left of the oratory, on the ground floor.

== See also ==
- List of museums in Paris
