= Marie Madeleine Davy =

French philosopher and war resister

Marie-Madeleine Davy
- Born: Marie-Madeleine Jeanne Élisabeth Davy; 13 September 1903; Saint-Mandé
- Died: 1 November 1998 (aged 95); Bressuire
- Burial place: Saint-Clémentin
- Education: Catholic University of Paris
- Occupations: Historian, philosopher, war resister

Marie-Madeleine Davy (1903–1998) was a French historian, philosopher, poet, novelist and lecturer, specializing in medieval mystical theology. During World War II, she was a prominent war resistor against German occupiers and was awarded the Croix de Guerre by General Charles de Gaulle in 1945 for saving the lives of Allied aviators and sympathizers stranded behind enemy lines.

== Biography ==
Marie-Madeleine Jeanne Élisabeth Davy was born in the Paris suburb of Saint-Mandé on 13 September 1903. As a teenager, she was a "real tomboy" who loved nature, wore only shorts or trousers, spoke in a deep voice and referred to herself using masculine words and phrases.

She earned her baccalaureate with honors at 17 in 1920, and the following year enrolled at the Sorbonne University, where she studied philosophy and history. She moved into a studio apartment against her family's wishes and supported herself by tutoring children. Davy became a student and disciple of philosopher Étienne Gilson. Before World War II, she went to Berlin to work as an assistant at the French Institute. She also taught at the University of Manchester (from 1947 to 1949) followed by Bedford College, London.

She was admitted to the Catholic Institute of Paris, but because she was the only woman, she was relegated to the back row of classrooms. Although she described her experience there as horrific, she earned a doctorate in Catholic theology in 1941. Davy then specialized in medieval theology and mysticism. She defended a Doctorate in Philosophy with highest honors in the 1940s with a thesis titled "Theology and Mysticism of William of Saint-Thierry."

=== Second World War resister ===
Davy joined the French Resistance in November 1940. She had returned to Paris from Berlin and was teaching philosophy at the Sorbonne, where she recruited new war resisters. She was an active leader and was considered a chief of the northern section of escape routes out of Paris. For the southerly Comet Line of escape, she provided false papers, clothing and lodging. For the Burgundy escape line, she connected evaders in Paris with safehouses on the line where others could guide them to safety.

Her guides took groups from Paris south through France and the Pyrenees mountains to Spain and then safely to Gibraltar and England. She also housed American, British and French escapees in the Chateau de la Fortelle, 30 miles southeast of Paris, which she called a "summer camp" staffed by University students. There the refugees could build up their strength for the arduous journey out of France. Known to American escapees as Miss Bourgeois, she was credited with helping many people, including Germans refusing to perform forced labor, Jews and Allied aviators.

=== Academic activities ===
Davy taught private courses in Rollin, Sainte-Marie de Neuilly and Reims, and she was a lecturer at a higher education school between 1939 and 1947. In 1955, she joined the research organization French National Centre for Scientific Research (CNRS) to translate texts from medieval Latin and eventually was elevated to Senior Research Fellow. She became widely known for her broad intellectual social circle, including the philosopher and Jesuit priest Teilhard de Chardin.

In 1968, Davy retired and devoted herself to spiritual research. She traveled extensively, including in Asia. She wrote about the experience saying, "The homeland of my soul proved to be Eastern... I owe a great deal to my stays in India and Japan." Furthermore, she came to admire the work of Henri Le Saux, also known as Swami Abhishiktananda. According to Jean Moncelon, her admiration can be explained by the fact that Le Saux’s "singular experience finds an echo in her [MMD], precisely because it presents itself as an experience of the Self—in other words, of 'that which lies beyond the divine persons'."

=== Last years ===
Marie-Madeleine Davy died at 95 on 1 November 1998 at the hospital in Bressuire in Deux-Sèvres and was buried at the cemetery in Saint-Clémentin. Her tombstone has the epitaph: Be happy, passerby.

== Selected honors ==
- Croix de Guerre 1945: presented by French General Charles de Gaulle

== Selected publications ==
- Essay on Romanesque symbolism, Flammarion, 1955 (1st edition)
- Medieval initiation, philosophy in the twelfth century, Albin Michel, 1980 and 1987
- Henri Le Saux, Swami Abhishiktnanda, The Ferryman Between Two Shores, Éditions du Cerf, 1981, reissued by Albin Michel, 1999
- The Inner Desert, Albin Michel, 1983, reissued 1996
- Self-Knowledge, PUF, 1988
- The Dance of Love and Humor, Présence Publishing, 1988
- Solo Crossing, Albin Michel, 1988
- Light in Christianity, Éditions du Félin, 1989
- The Bird and its Symbolism, Albin Michel, 1992 (Alexandra David-Néel/Lama Yongden Prize )
- Everything is a wedding, Albin Michel, 1993
- Nicolas Berdiaev or the revolution of the mind, Albin Michel, 1999
- The Inner Man and His Metamorphoses, followed by A Journey to Discover Interiority, Albin Michel, 2005
