= Joseph-Hippolyte Guibert =

French Catholic Archbishop of Paris and Cardinal (1802–1886)

His Eminence Joseph-Hippolyte Guibert O.M.I.
- Cardinal, Archbishop of Paris
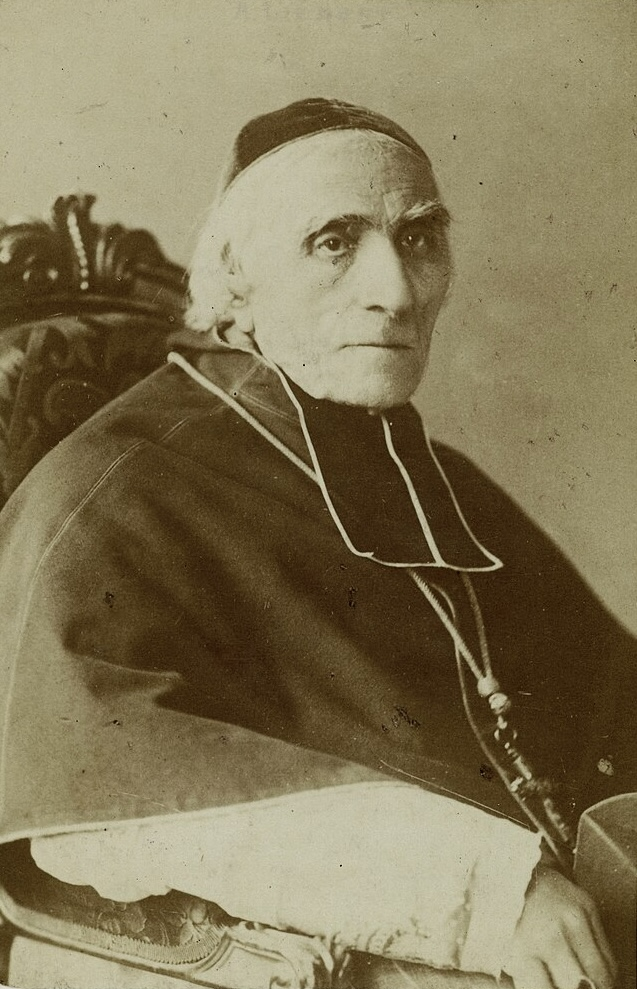
- Church: Roman Catholic Church
- Archdiocese: Paris
- See: Paris
- Appointed: 27 October 1871
- Term ended: 8 July 1886
- Predecessor: Georges Darboy
- Successor: François-Marie-Benjamin Richard de la Vergne
- Other post: Cardinal-Priest of San Giovanni a Porta Latina (1874–86)
- Previous posts: Bishop of Viviers (1842–57); Archbishop of Tours (1857–71)

Orders
- Ordination: 14 August 1825 by Fortuné-Charles de Mazenod
- Consecration: 11 March 1842 by Charles-Joseph-Eugéne de Mazenod
- Created cardinal: 22 December 1873 by Pope Pius IX
- Rank: Cardinal-Priest

Personal details
- Born: Joseph-Hippolyte Guibert; 13 December 1802 Aix-en-Provence, French First Republic
- Died: 8 July 1886 (aged 83) Paris, French Third Republic
- Buried: Notre-Dame de Paris (1886–1925); Sacred Heart Basilica (from 1925)
- Parents: Pierre Guibert; Rose-Françoise Pécout
- Motto: Suaviter ac fortiter
- Coat of arms

Joseph-Hippolyte Guibert (French: [ʒozɛf ipɔlit ɡibɛʁ]; 13 December 1802 in Aix-en-Provence, Bouches-du-Rhône – 1886, Paris) was a French Catholic Archbishop of Paris and Cardinal. A member of the Missionary Oblates of Mary Immaculate, his tenure as archbishop saw the establishment of the Institut Catholique de Paris and the construction of Sacré-Cœur on Montmartre.

== Life ==
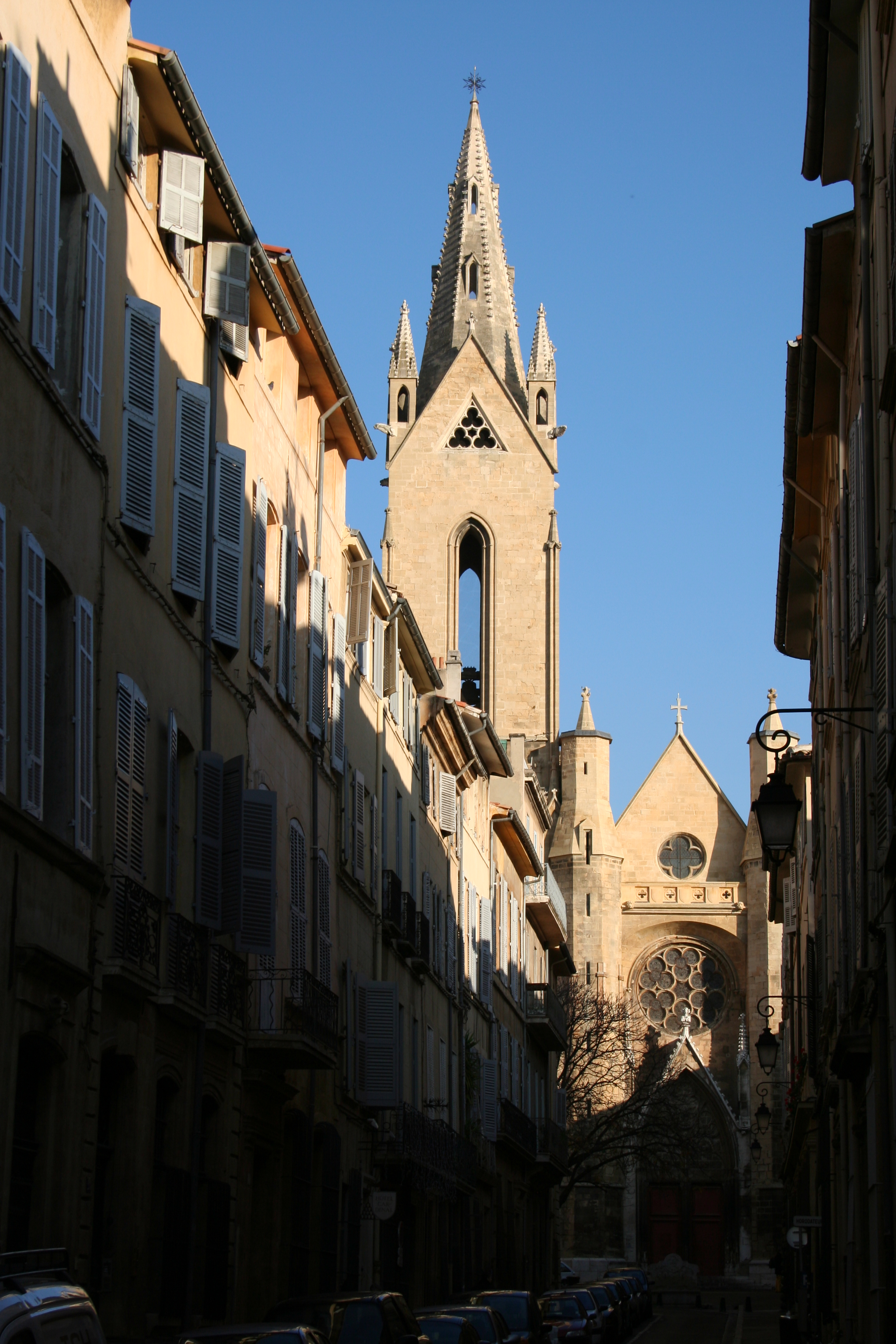
Saint-Jean-de-Malte, Aix-en-Provence

Joseph-Hippolyte Guibert was born on 13 December 1802, Aix-en-Provence to Pierre and Rose-Françoise Pécout Guilbert. His father was a farmer and property manager for the Count of Felix. Joseph Hippolyte was baptized on 19 December in the Church of St. John of Malta, where he was later an altar boy, and took Latin classes.

In 1819, Guibert entered the major seminary in Aix, and received minor orders on 1 June 1822. Despite the opposition of his father, he joined the "Missionaries of Provence" and began his novitiate in January 1823 Guibert was ordained a priest in 1825.

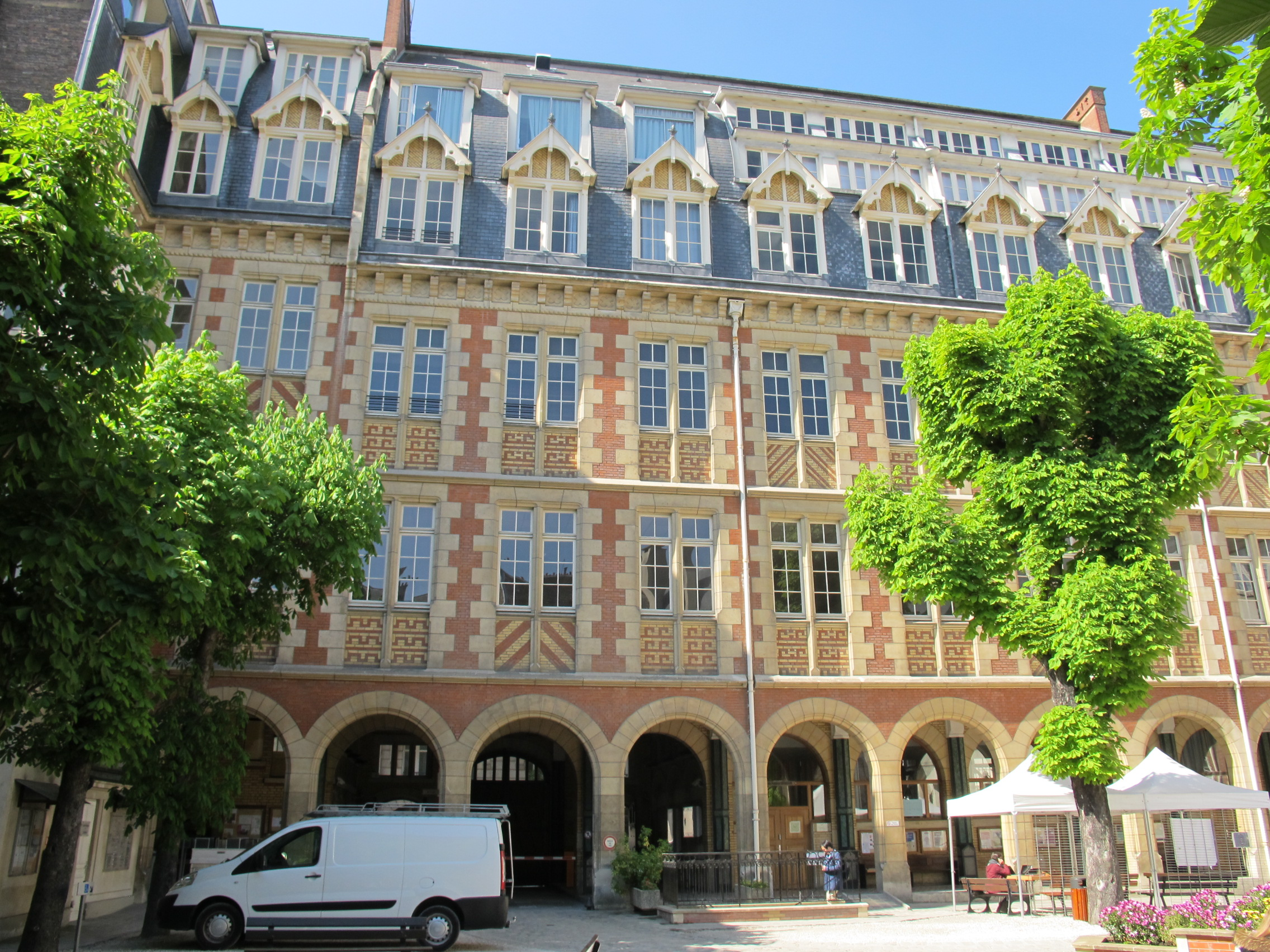
Institut catholique, Paris

Guibert was appointed bishop of Viviers in 1841, and archbishop of Tours in 1857. He attended the First Vatican Council, where he was counted among the moderates. He became Archbishop of Paris in 1871, and a Cardinal in 1873. Cardinal Guibert called upon Maurice Le Sage d'Hauteroche d'Hulst to take part in the administration of the diocese, but he was engaged principally in founding and organizing the Université Catholique de Paris.

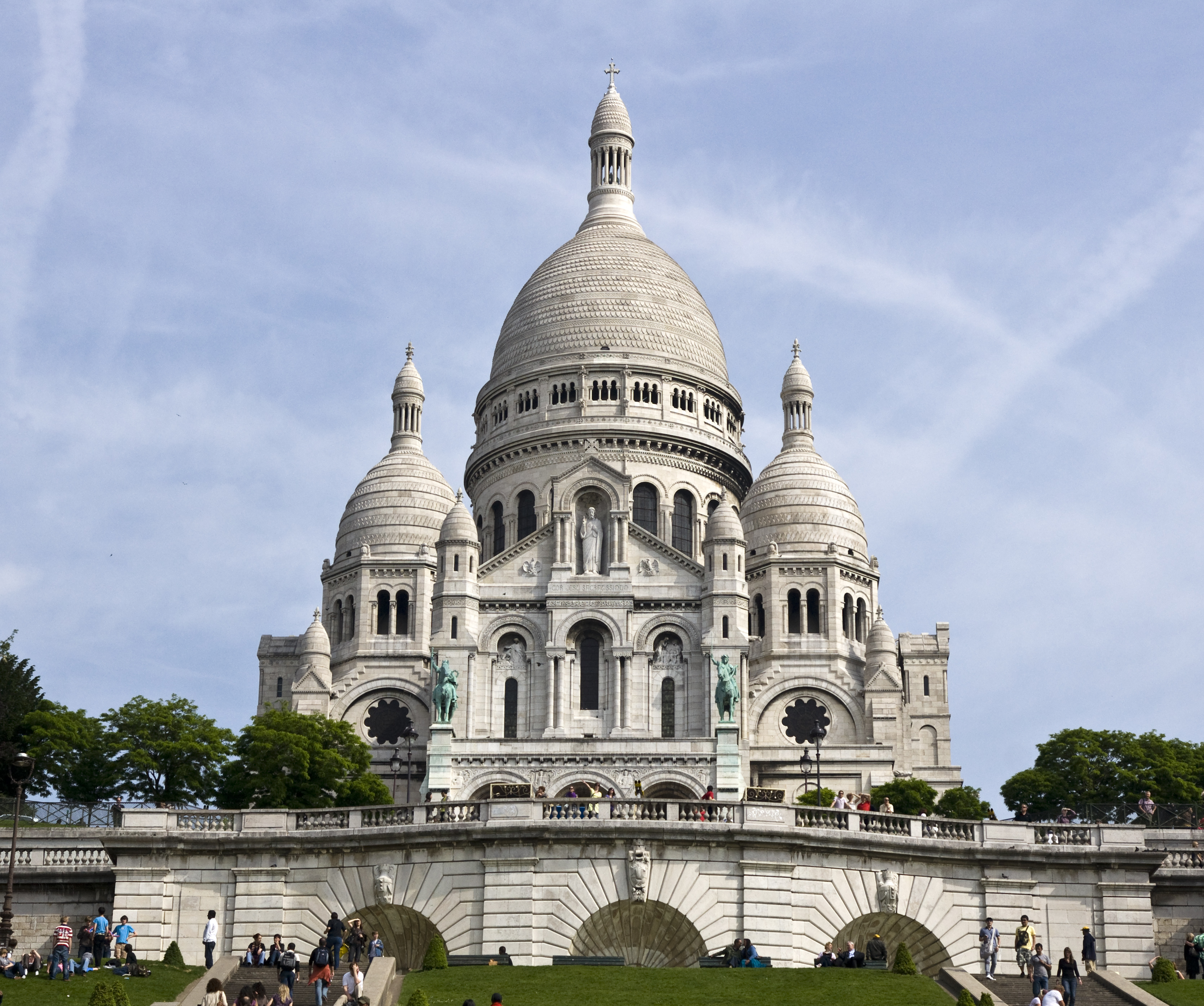
Basilique-Sacre Coeur, Paris

Guibert participated in the 1878 conclave. His tenure also saw the construction of Sacré-Cœur, Paris.

Guibert died on 8 July 1886 in Paris and is buried in Sacré-Cœur on Montmartre.

His writings are collected in the Oeuvres pastorales (5 vols., 1868-89).

Catholic Church titles
Preceded by Georges Darboy	Archbishop of Paris; 1871–1886	Succeeded by François-Marie-Benjamin Richard
