= Henri Baudrillart =

French economist

Henri Joseph Léon Baudrillart (1821–1892) was a French economist.

== Life ==
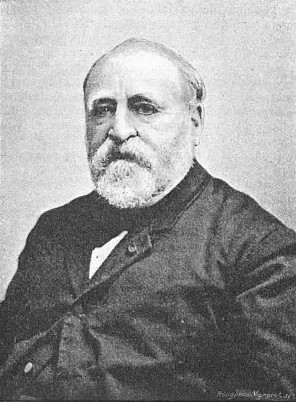
Henri Baudrillart

He was born in Paris on 28 November 1821. His father, Jacques Joseph (1774-1832), was a distinguished writer on forestry, and was for many years in the service of the French government, eventually becoming the head of that branch of the department of agriculture which had charge of the state forests. Henri was educated at the College Bourbon, where he had a distinguished career, and in 1852 he was appointed assistant lecturer in political economy to M. Chevalier at the College de France.

In 1866, on the creation of a new chair of economic history, Baudrillart was appointed to fill it. His first work was an Eloge de Turgot (1846), which at once won him notice among the economists. In 1853, he published an erudite work on Jean Bodin et son temps; then in 1857 a Manuel d'économic politique; in 1860, Des rapports de la morale et de l’économie politique; in 1865, La Liberté du travail; and from 1878 to 1880, L'Histoire du luxe depuis Fantiquité jusqu'd nos jours, in four volumes.

At the instance of the Académie des Sciences Morales et Politiques. he investigated the condition of the farming classes of France, and published the results in four volumes (1885, et seq.). From 1855 to 1864, he directed the Journal des économistes, and contributed many articles to the Journal des débats and to the Revue des deux mondes.

His writings are distinguished by their style, as well as by their profound erudition. In 1863 he was elected member of the Académie des Sciences Morales et Politiques; in 1870 he was appointed inspector-general of public libraries, and in 1881 he succeeded J. Garnier as professor of political economy at the Ecole des Ponts et Chaussées. Baudrillart was made an officer of the Legion of Honour in 1889.

He died in Paris on 24 January 1892. His son was cardinal Alfred-Henri-Marie Baudrillart.
