= Musée Edouard Branly =

Museum in Paris, France

Coordinates: 48°50′56″N 2°19′46″E

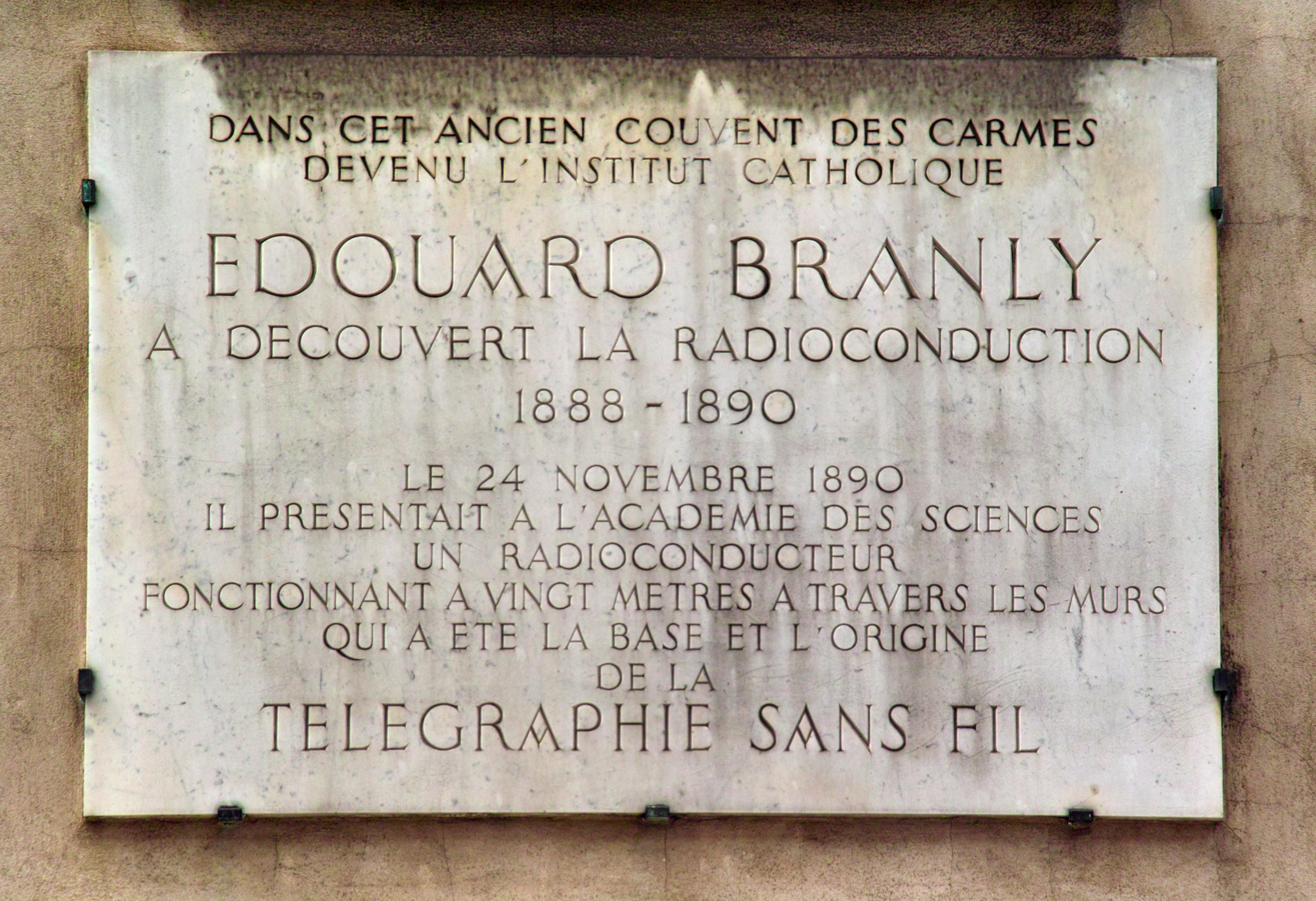
Plaque at the Musée Édouard Branly on rue d'Assas in Paris

The Musée Édouard Branly (French pronunciation: [myze ədwaʁ bʁɑ̃li]) is a museum dedicated to the work of radio pioneer Édouard Branly (1844―1940). It is located in the 6th arrondissement at the Institut Catholique de Paris-ISEP, 21, rue d'Assas, Paris, France, and open by appointment only.

The museum contains the research laboratory and equipment used by Édouard Branly, a physics professor at the Institut Catholique de Paris and inventor of the first widely used radio receiver, the Branly coherer circa 1884―1886. Its collection includes a number of early devices used in wireless experiments, such as electrolytic detectors, insulated tubes filled with metal filings, a Righi oscillator, generators, electromagnets, metallic blades mounted on glass, electrical contacts, and a column of six steel balls stacked in a glass cylinder.

== See also ==
- Musée du quai Branly, an art museum
- List of museums in Paris
