= National Museum of Decorative Arts, Buenos Aires =

Coordinates: 34°34′57.5″S 58°24′3.8″W

National Museum of Decorative Arts
- Museo Nacional de Arte Decorativo
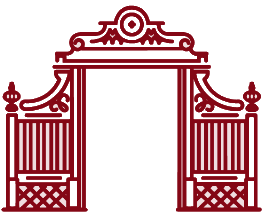

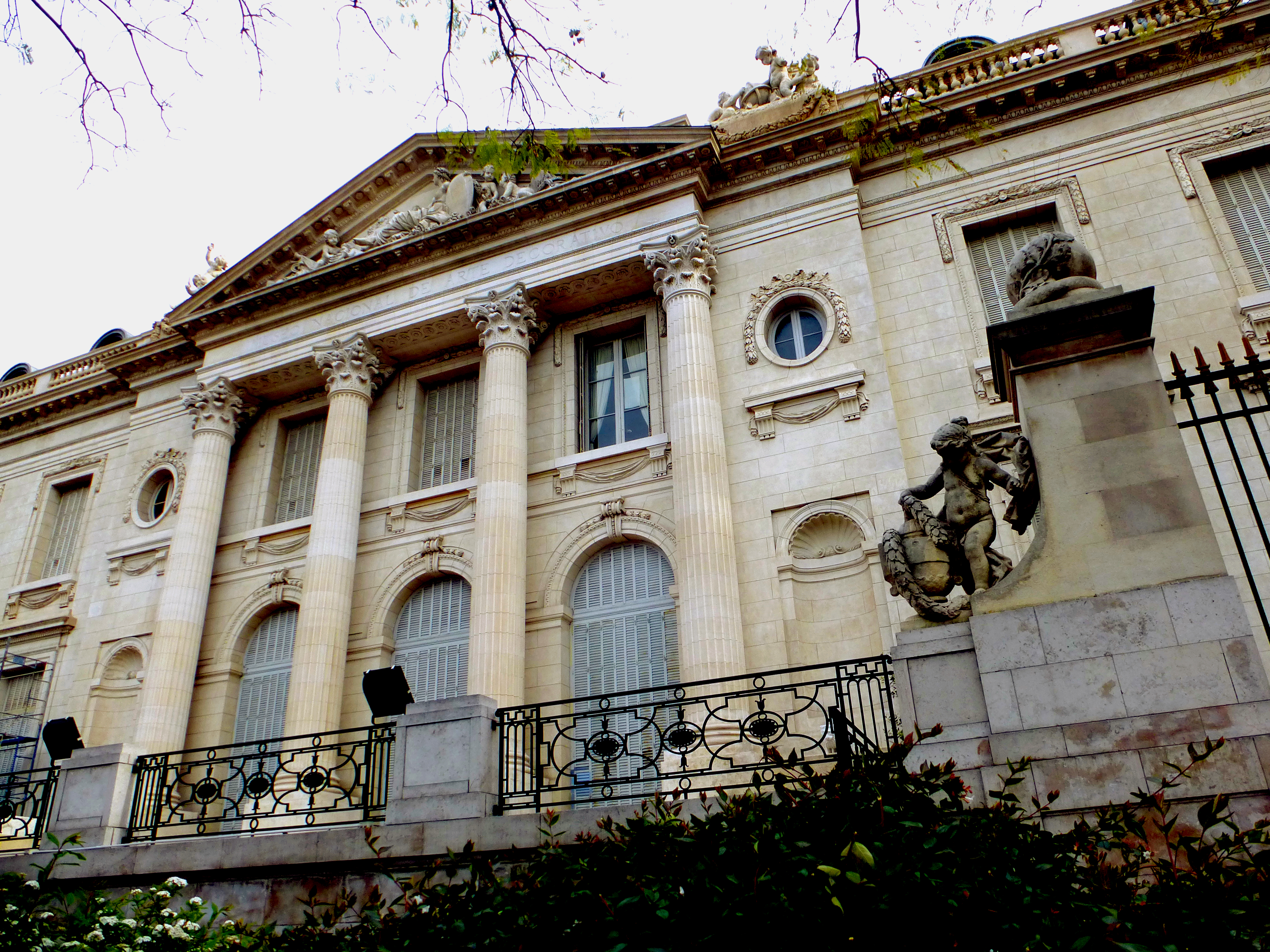
- Palacio Errazúriz, seat of the museum
- Established: 1937; 89 years ago
- Location: Buenos Aires, Argentina
- Type: Art museum
- Accreditation: Municipal museum
- Key holdings: Palacio Errázuriz (1911)
- Collections: Luix XV; Art deco
- Director: Alberto Bellucci
- Owner: Government of the City of Buenos Aires
- Website: museoartedecorativo.cultura.gob.ar

The National Museum of Decorative Arts is an art museum in Recoleta, Buenos Aires, Argentina.

== History ==
The museum has its origins in a marriage in 1897 between two prominent members of turn-of-the-century Argentine high society: Matías Errazúriz, the son of Chilean émigrés, and Josefina de Alvear, the granddaughter of Independence-era leader Carlos María de Alvear.

The couple commissioned French architect René Sergent in 1911 to design a mansion for Errazúriz's future retirement from the diplomatic corps, in which he had been Ambassador to France for a number of years. The ornate Neoclassical structure inspired the Bosch family to commission a similar palace nearby (today the United States Ambassador's residence). Completed in 1916, the couple devoted the following two years to decorating the palace, purchasing a large volume of antiques and other objets d'art.

When Mrs. Errazúriz died in 1935, however, the widower bequeathed the mansion to the Argentine government, on his son's and daughter's advice. The National Museum of Decorative Arts was established in 1937.

== Residence ==
Under Law 12351 the Argentine state bought the residence and the art collections which gave birth to the Museo Nacional de Arte Decorativo on 18 December 1937. The project of the building, a sample of pure eclecticism, was designed by the French architect René Sergent in 1911 but it was finished in 1917 due to the difficulties caused by the First World War. Sergent's team was a group of selected decorators specialized in interior-decoration and gardens. H. Nelson, G. Hoentschel, M. Carlhian worked the rooms; the gardens were the responsibility of the French expert Achille Duchêne. The materials were brought from Europe: wooden panels, mirrors, marble, woodworks, frames, latches; a number of European artisans were called for some of the stucco decorations.

Its imposing and sober façade takes from the French Neo-classicism of the 18th century, especially from the works of Jacques A. Gabriel, architect in the Court of Louis XV. The building has four levels visible from the external façade: on the basement, the windows of the cellars. Gigantic Corinthian columns in the façade cover the two most important levels: the principal floor with round arches leading to the garden and terrace and the first floor where the family rooms were installed. On the top floor, in the attic were the rooms of the servants with the windows hidden by a balustrade.

=== Interior ===
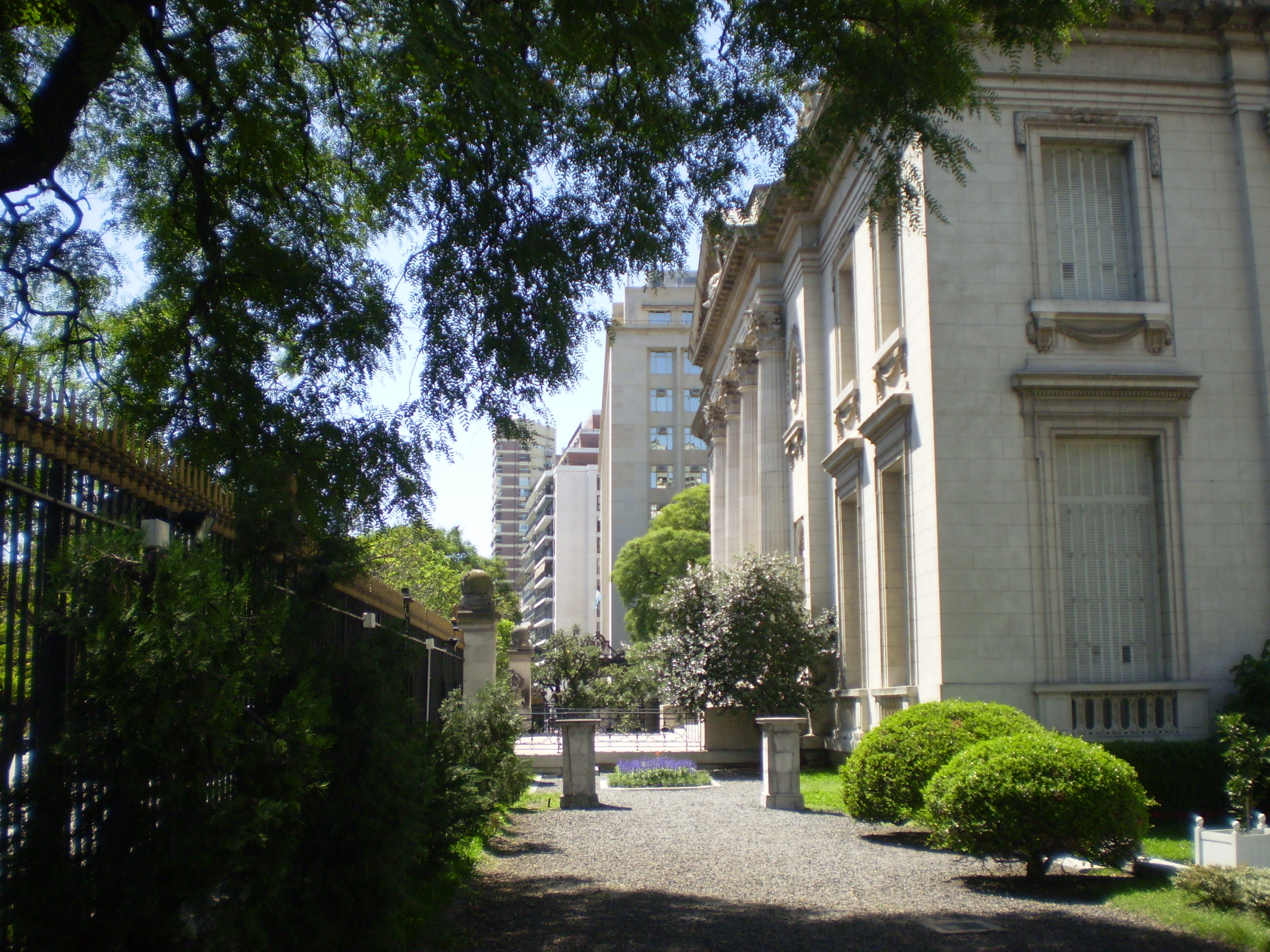
The gardens and the neighboring Argentine Automobile Association

The Entrance Hall: The walls and the ceiling are completely covered by fake Paris stone. The luxurious stairs lead to the principal floor. Its sumptuous Louis XV style was accomplished including in its decoration Ionic pilasters, arcs and groin vault ceilings. Above the cornice are allegories of the Arts: Music, Architecture, Sculpture and Painting which emphasize the Neoclassic character of the rooms.

Antechamber: Decorated in a Neoclassic mode, the Louis XV style is evident in the wooden panels: polished oak with frames and carvings, the ceiling – with central lighting – is decorated with plaster frames. This is a room that connects with four other rooms and the area of the stairs and the lift.

The Great Hall (Renaissance): It is the biggest apartment of the residence and the only one with double height and an axis around which all the activities of the house took place. The ceiling is decorated with caissons and patterned glass; above: a hidden structure of big iron entablature to support five big chandeliers. The floor consists of parquetry with a design of stars combining maple and walnut wood. High windows with colored glass, the decoration of the ceiling, the imposing fireplace and the walls covered with tapestry and wood evoke the great English halls of the 16th century Tudor style.

The Dining-room: This luxurious room was planned bearing in mind the frequent dinners and social events offered by Mr. Matías Errázuriz and Mrs. Josefina de Alvear. It was inspired by the Palace of Versailles and especially its Hercules Room was the chosen model. The baroque atmosphere was accomplished by the combination of marble from Carrara in Italy and from the French Central Massif.

The Winter Garden: creates a beautiful connection between the dining-room and the ball room. As far as design is concerned, the selection of sober Louis XVI style has proved fundamental. The color of the walls is in harmony with the golden and pale tones of the walls of the Regency Room. The texture and shades of the marble works replicated in this room by stucco decorations create a total harmony with the panels in the dining-room.

The Ball-room: evokes the period of the Regency and the transition from the solemn luxury of the Baroque to the subtle grace of the Rococo. The curves are the outstanding feature of the design. All the frames, the wooden plates joining the ceiling by means of a decidedly curved carving, the angles of the room and the union of the walls with the ceiling are based upon curved lines. The pale colors, the use of the light and its reflections, the abundance of the gilding and of mirror-panels hide the limits of the actual space.

The Room of Madame: Comfortable chairs, armchairs, tables and boudoirs of Louis XVIII design were favored by Mrs. Josefina de Alvear's when receiving visitors. The panels of painted wood, the frame woods and ornamental molding remind the visitor of the influence of Marie Antoinette in all the decoration. All the chandeliers, crystal, and bronze were inspired in the decoration of the Versailles' Grand Trianon.

The Study of Mr. Matías de Errázuriz: is entirely the accomplishment of the French decorator André Carlhian (1887–1963). Here we can admire the combination of panels of carved, polished oak and some sections in red velvet tapestry. In this Neoclassic room, Don Matías enjoyed his moments of solitary meditation, surrounded by paintings from the 19th century, Japanese lacquer decorations, and the Chinese hard stones.

The first floor was reserved to the private rooms of the family. Each member had an apartment with a private living room, bedroom, dressing room, bathroom and toilette.

The Gallery of Tapestries surrounds the Great Hall on three sides. Here we can admire French and Flemish tapestries of the 16th, 17th and 18th centuries along with furniture and paintings from the same periods.

The "Sert" room: was the boudoir of Matías Errázuriz Alvear and its name honors the Catalan painter, Josep Maria Sert (1876–1945), who created this decoration in the Art Déco style. The stucco paneled walls, the enormous entablature, the gilded doors, and the four paintings are part of the project of the Spanish artist.

The antechambers and the bedroom of Matías Errázuriz Alvear complete the apartments of the son. These rooms do not have the original furniture, which was taken when the house was sold, but they are presented with an exceptional assembly of furniture and objects of neo-classic style of the period comprised between the era of Louis XVI and Napoleon I.

Room Zubov: The room was once a family room. Today it is the site of a collection of miniatures belonging to the Countess Rosario S. de Zubov, dedicated in memory of her daughter Tatiana. In 2000, the Asinari Di Bernezzo collection was added. The whole exhibition shows extraordinary samples of European portraits in miniature from the 16th to 19th centuries. It can be paralleled with the important French and English collections.

== Collection ==
The museum maintains twelve exhibit halls and nine permanent collections containing over 4,000 objects including:

- paintings: notable among them El Greco's Jesus Bearing the Cross Uphill, Jean-Honoré Fragonard's The Sacrifice of the Rose and Édouard Manet's Portrait of Abbé Hurel
- sculpture: among them an Ancient Roman Minerva, Cristoforo Mantegazza's Adoration of the Magii (a wall relief in marble) and Auguste Rodin's The Eternal Spring
- East Asian art: numerous Chinese vases and jade sculptures from the Qianlong era, among others; as well as tapestries, porcelains, 18th century furniture, the most important public miniature art collection in the Americas and other antiques, generally from before 1800.

The collection is also complemented by temporary exhibits, and the museum hosts regular choral concerts as well as classes and seminars. Visitors can also enjoy Café Croque Madame, whose tables are set in the gardens in good weather. Since 1944, the Argentine Academy of Letters has also been housed in this location.

=== Image ===
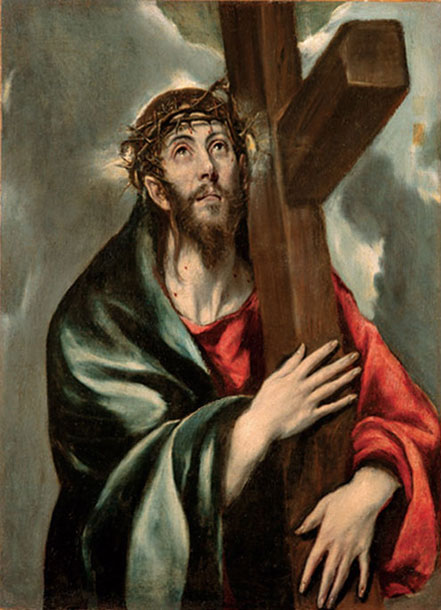
Jesus Bearing the Cross Uphill, El Greco

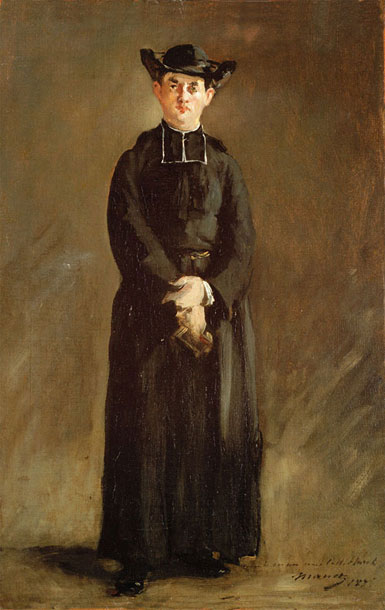
Portrait of Abbé Hurel, Édouard Manet

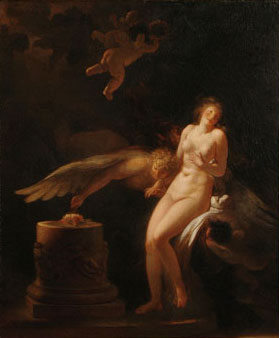
The Sacrifice of the Rose, Jean-Honoré Fragonard

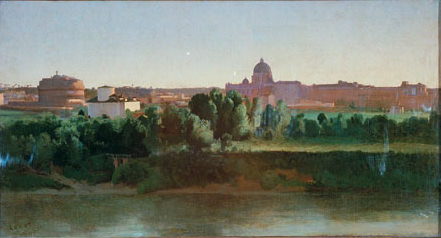
View of Castel Sant'Angelo, Jean Baptiste Camille Corot

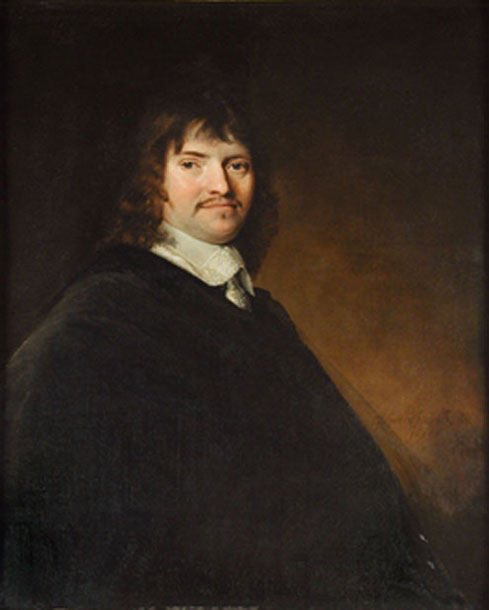
Portrait of gentleman, Johannes Cornelisz Verspronck

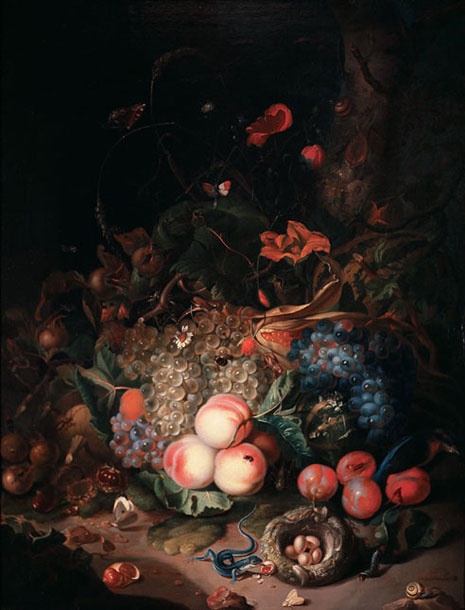
Still life, Rachel Ruysch

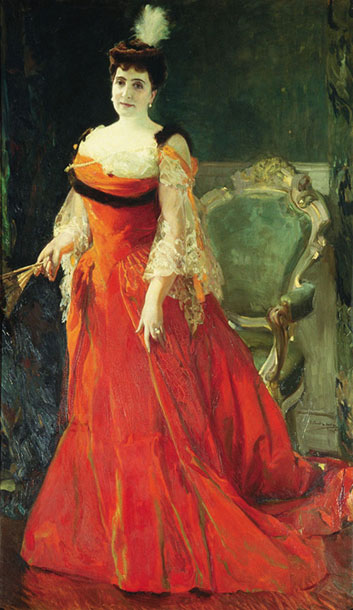
Josefina de Alvear de Errázuriz, Joaquín Sorolla

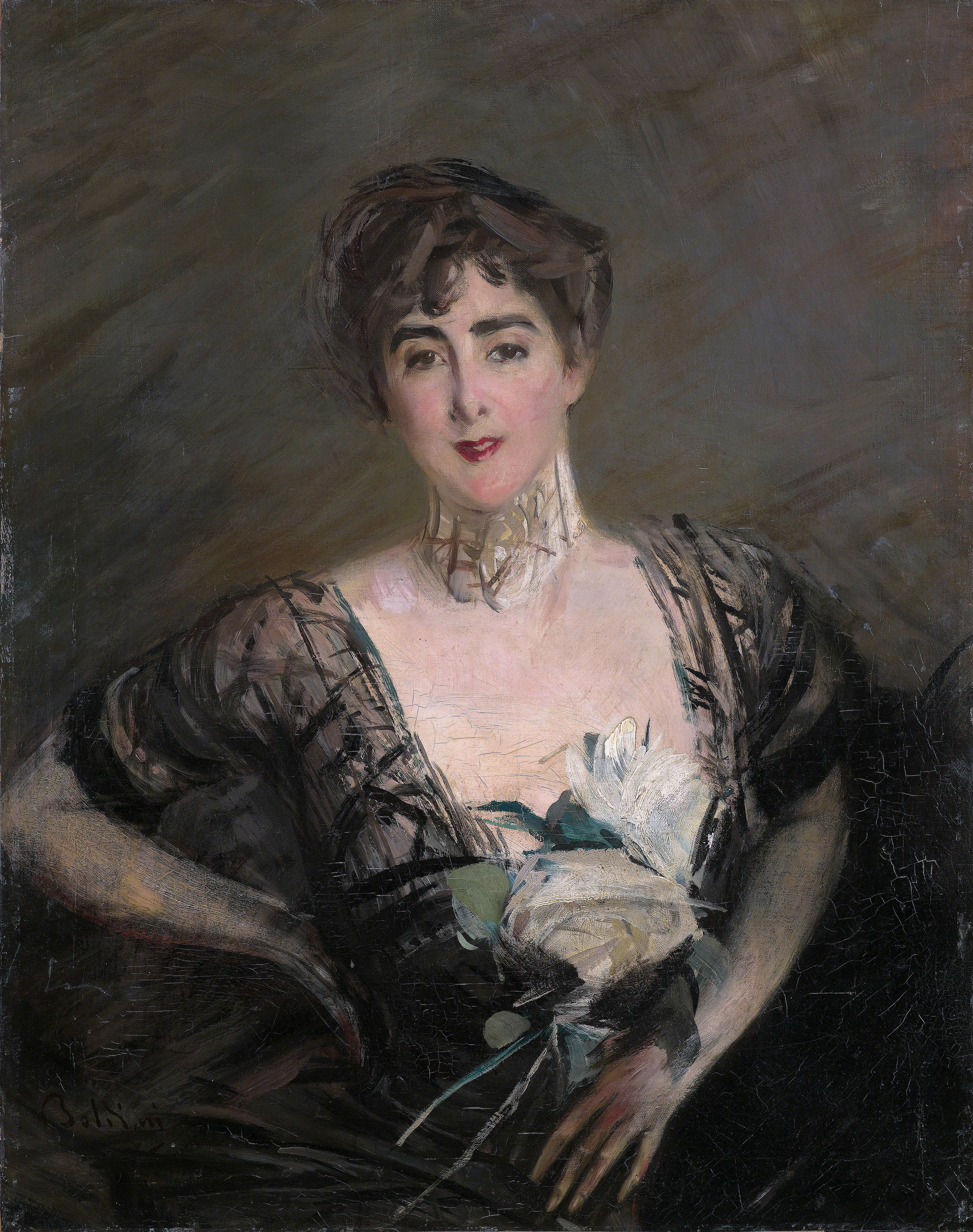
Josefina de Alvear de Errázuriz, Giovanni Boldini

== Gallery ==
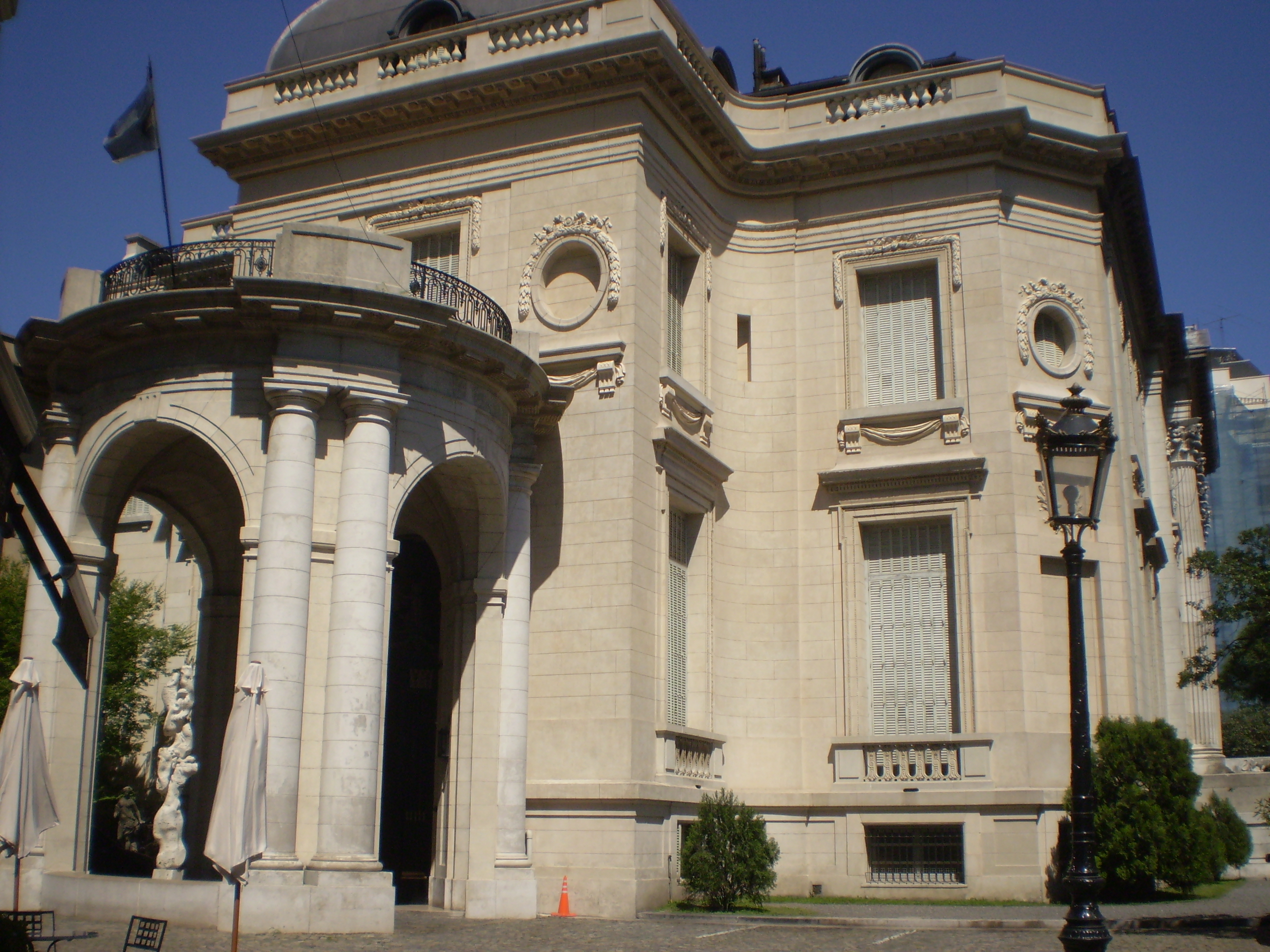

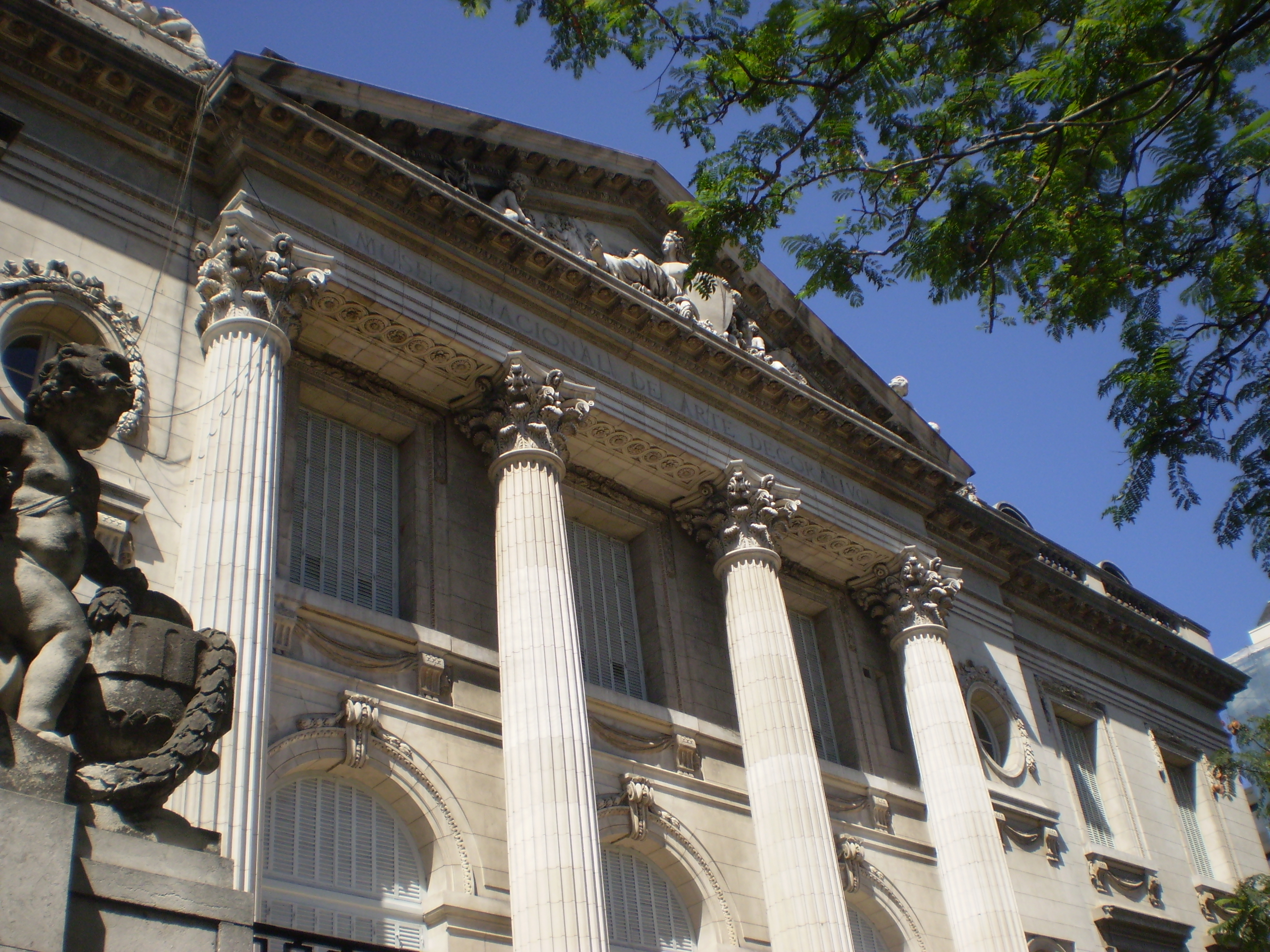

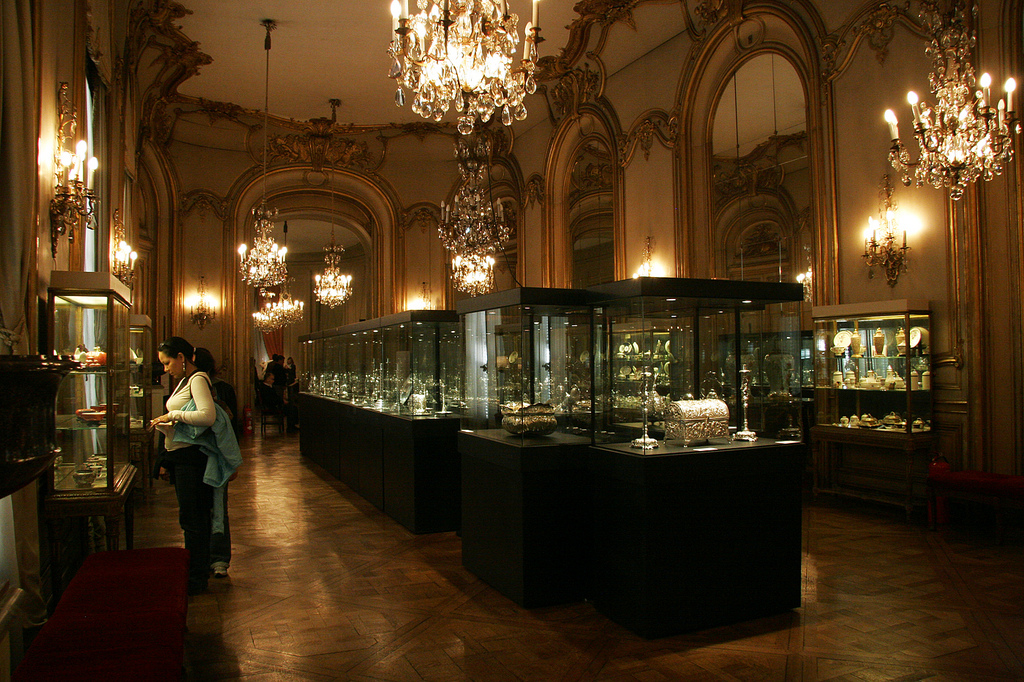

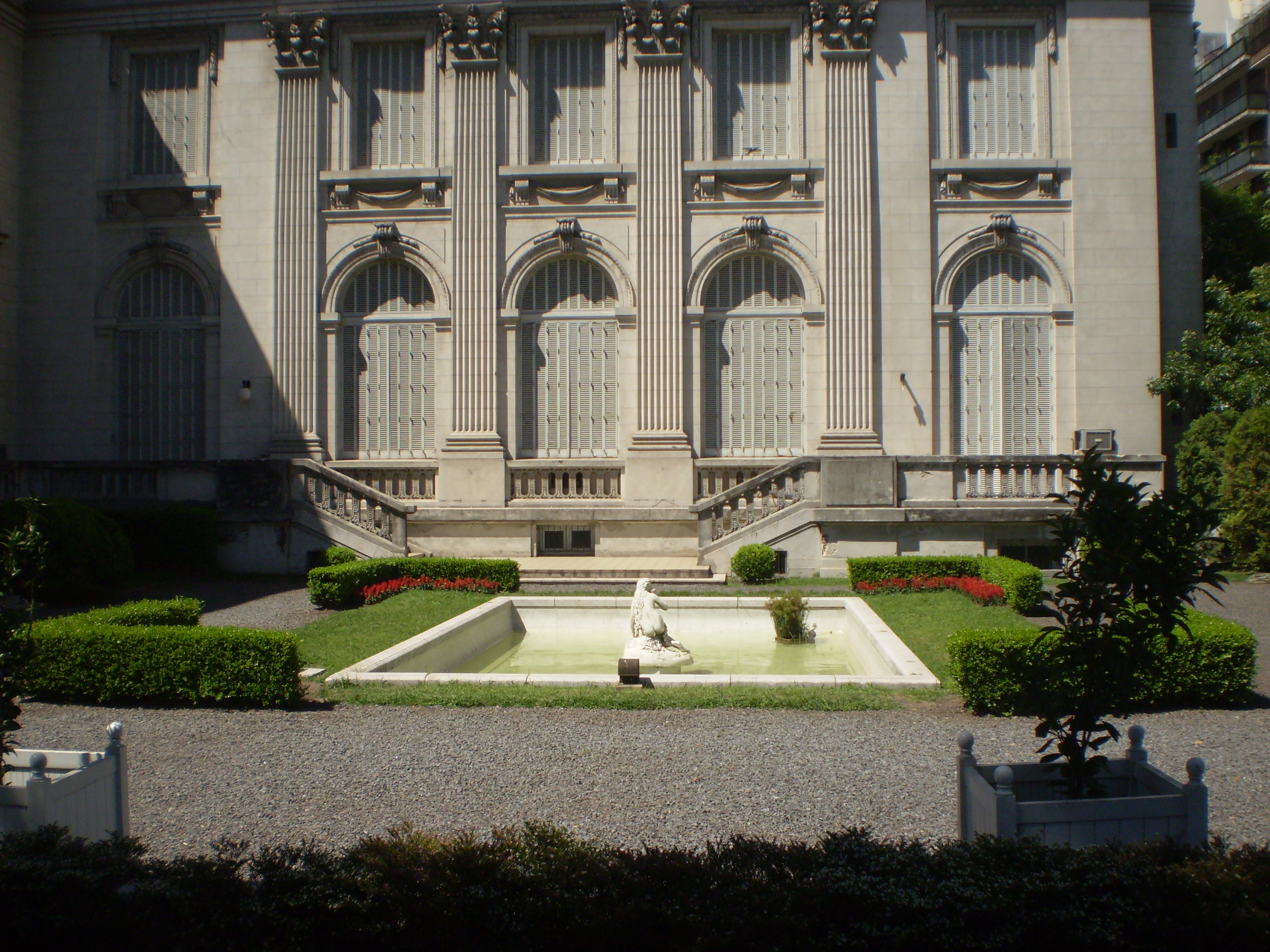

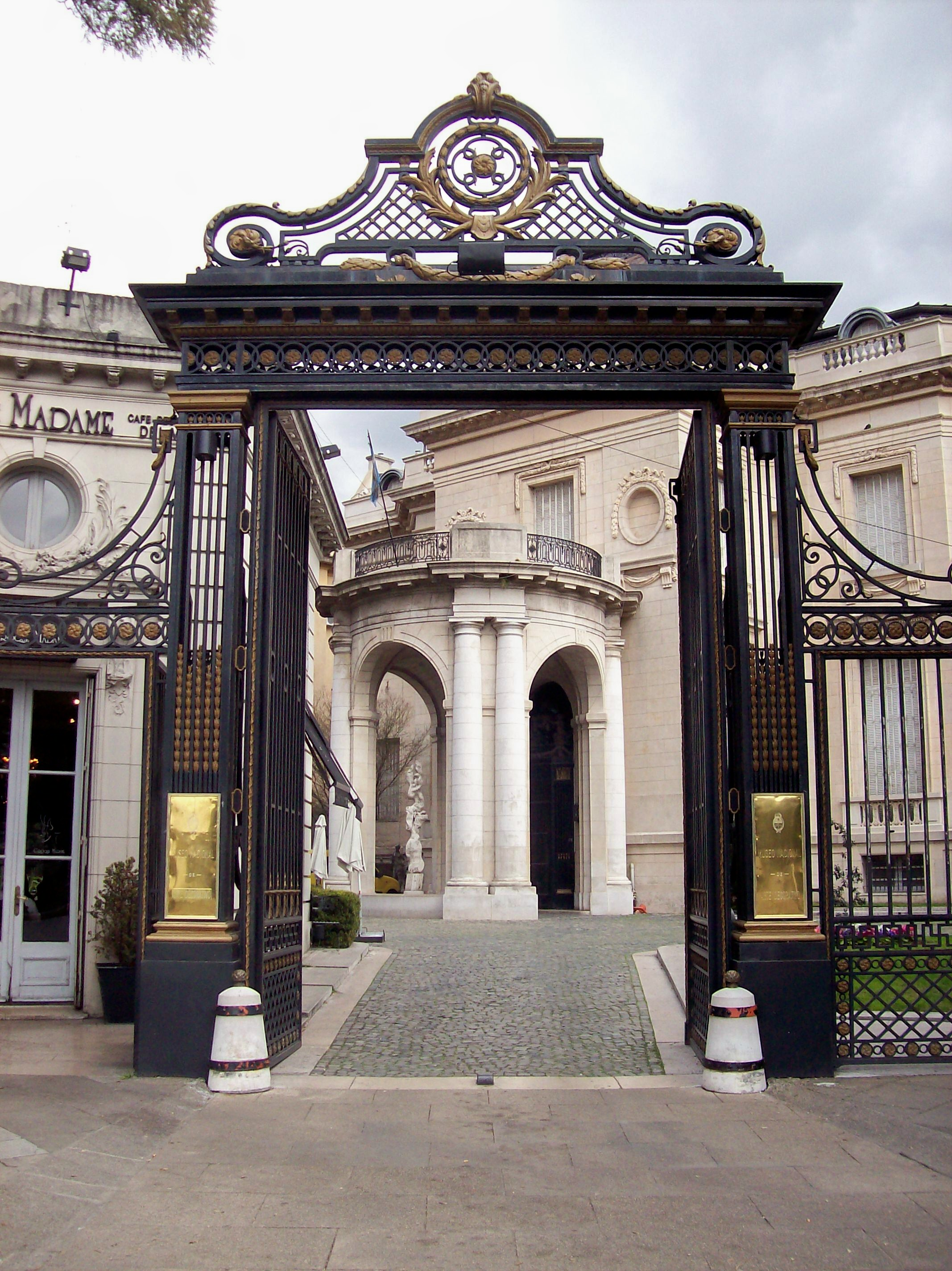

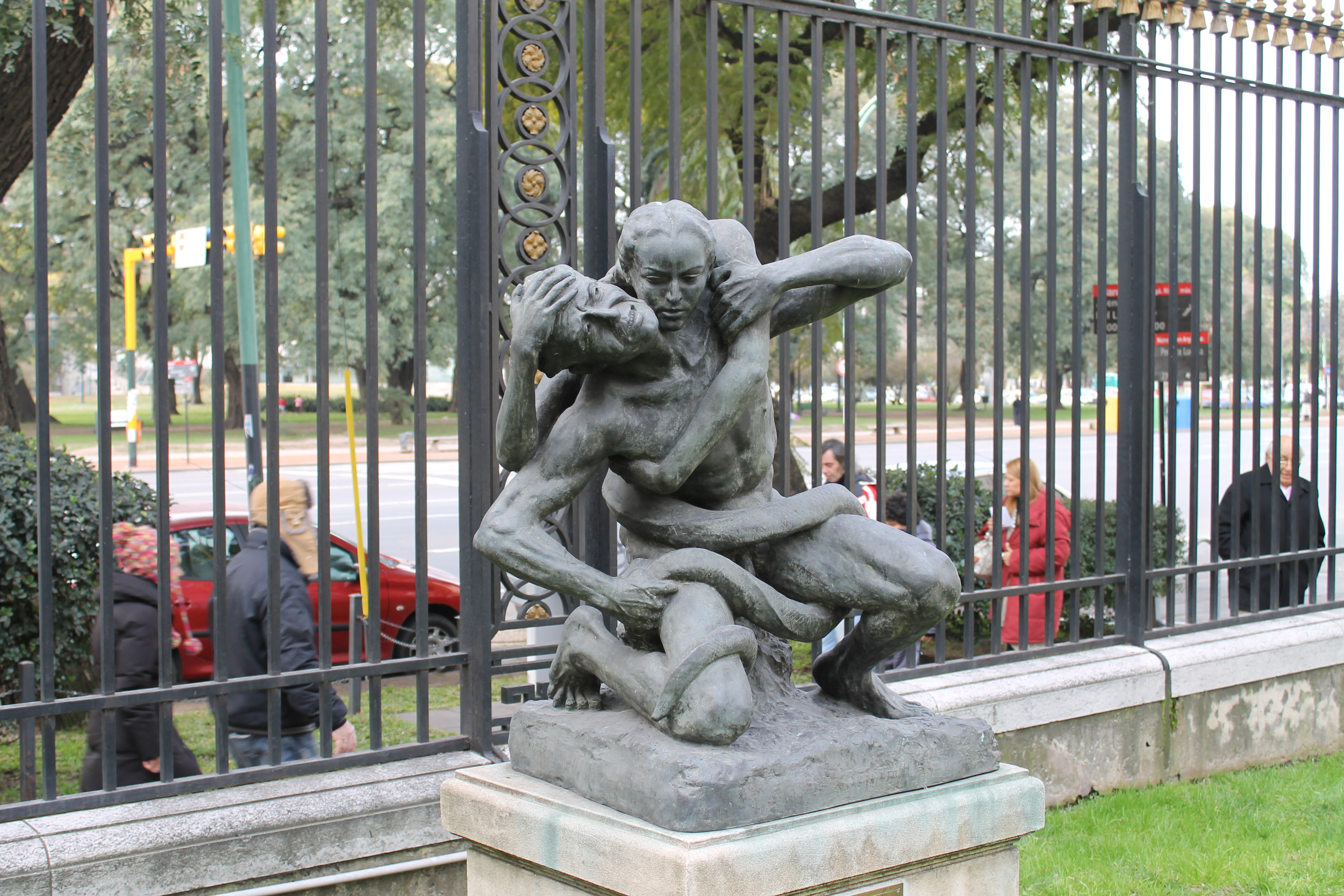

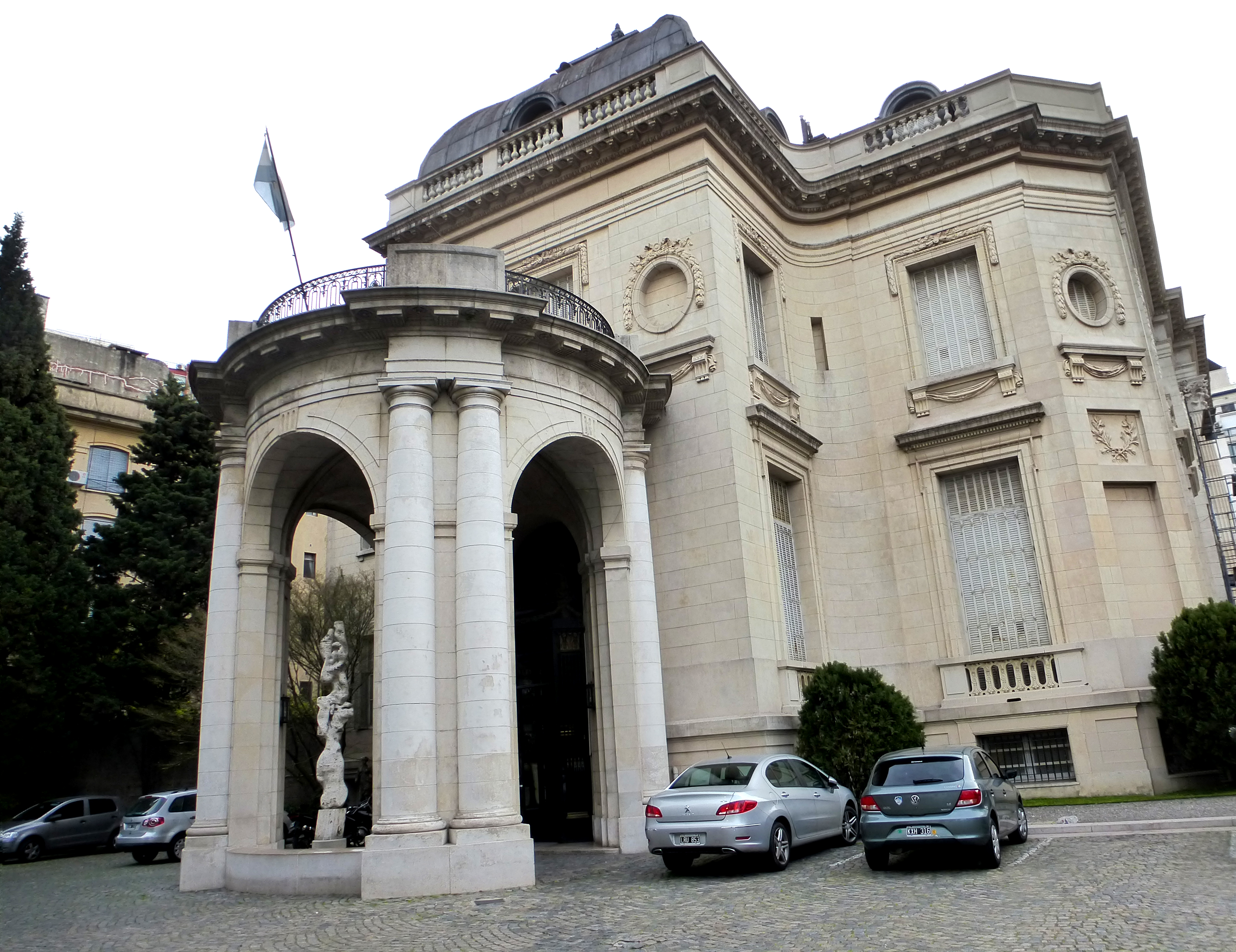
