= Josefina de Alvear =

Argentine aristocrat (1859–1935)

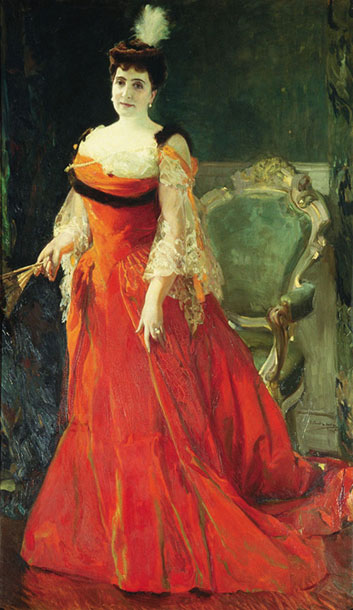
- Portrait by Joaquín Sorolla, 1905
- Born: 1859
- Died: 1935 (aged 75–76); Buenos Aires, Argentina
- Known for: Overseeing the construction of the Palacio Errázuriz; Founding the town of San Gregorio

Josefina de Alvear (1859–1935) was an Argentine aristocrat who, along with her husband, oversaw the construction of the Palacio Errázuriz, a large residence in the city of Buenos Aires.

== Biography ==
In 1885, de Alvear married Gregorio Rodríguez, who owned several large tracts of land which he inherited after the death of his father. Rodríguez died soon after, and in 1893, de Alvear, now widowed, founded the town of San Gregorio, in the southern end of the state of Santa Fe, naming the town after her late husband. Today, San Gregorio has over 5,000 residents.

In 1897, de Alvear married Chilean diplomat Matías Errázuriz Ortúzar. She moved to Buenos Aires and had two children. Due to the diplomatic nature of her husband's job, the family also spent significant time in France, especially in the cities of Paris and Biarritz. During this time, the family oversaw the construction of a massive home in the city, which was started by French architect René Sergent in 1911 in honor of their marriage. The house was completed in 1918, and was often named the Palacio Errázuriz. In all, the family lived in the house for around 18 years.

De Alvear died in 1935, of cancer.

== Legacy ==
After her death, the Palacio Errázuriz was given to the Argentine government and converted into a museum. Today, the palace is the site of the National Museum of Decorative Arts. De Alvear remains a prominent figure in Argentina, with newspaper La Nación defining her and the palace she resided in as a "symbol" of the Argentine aristocracy.
