= Edmond de Fels =

French diplomat, writer, and historian

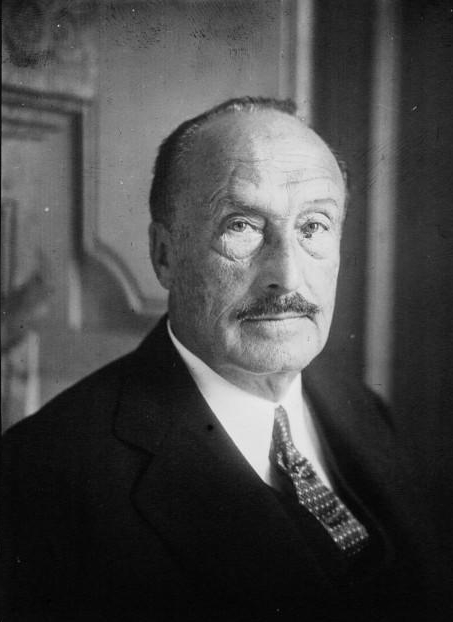
Edmond de Fels

Edmond de Fels (1858, in Marseille – 1951) was a French diplomat, writer and historian.

== Biography ==
Edmond Gustave Frisch was born in Marseille on July 30, 1858. His mother, Anna Fölsch von Fels (1826–1893), was born and died in Marseille. The Fölsch von Fels family, originally from Hamburg, Germany, produced a long dynasty of Swedish Consuls in Marseille, a post the family held continuously for 150 years in the city, from 1731 to 1881. His father, Jules Théodore Frisch (1818–1895), was born in Copenhagen and died in Marseille. He was a shipbroker and Danish Consul in Marseille from 1849 to 1858.

Edmond Frisch is a diplomat based in Tunis and Madrid.

On December 3, 1888, in Paris, he married Jeanne Lebaudy (1865–1943), a wealthy heiress to the Lebaudy sugar dynasty whose mother was the philanthropist Amicie Lebaudy and whose brothers Jacques Lebaudy, Robert and Max Lebaudy.
