= Louis-Ernest Dubois =

French cardinal (1856–1929)

His Eminence Louis-Ernest Dubois
- Cardinal, Archbishop of Paris
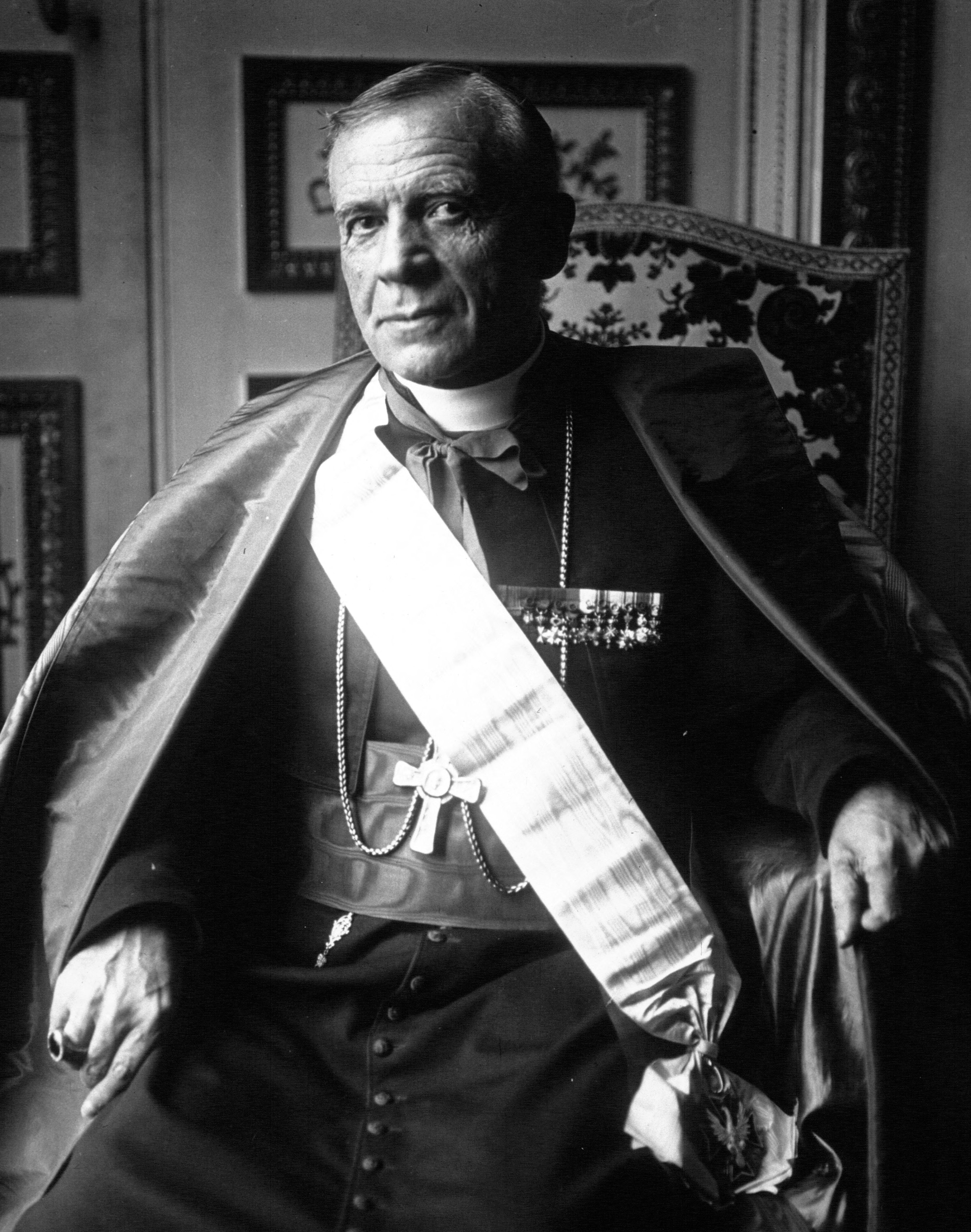
- Cardinal Dubois in 1926
- Church: Catholic Church
- Archdiocese: Paris
- Installed: 1920
- Term ended: 23 September 1929
- Predecessor: Léon-Adolphe Amette
- Successor: Jean Verdier
- Other post: Cardinal-Priest of Santa Maria in Aquiro
- Previous posts: Bishop of Verdun (1901–1909); Archbishop of Bourges (1910–1916); Archbishop of Rouen, Primate of Normandy (1916–1920)

Orders
- Ordination: 20 September 1879
- Consecration: 2 July 1901 by Marie-Prosper-Adolphe de Bonfils
- Created cardinal: 4 December 1916 by Benedict XV
- Rank: Cardinal-Priest

Personal details
- Born: 1 September 1856 Saint-Calais, France
- Died: 23 September 1929 (aged 73) Paris, France
- Buried: Notre Dame de Paris
- Coat of arms

Styles of Louis-Ernest Dubois
- Reference style: His Eminence
- Spoken style: Your Eminence
- Informal style: Cardinal
- See: Paris

Louis-Ernest Dubois (French pronunciation: [lwi ɛʁnɛst dybwa]; 1 September 1856 – 23 September 1929) was a cardinal and Archbishop of Paris. He played a leading role in the period of adjustment to the separation of Church and State in France.

== Early life ==
He was born in Saint-Calais (Sarthe), the second of six children of Louis Dubois, a nailmaker, and his wife, Henriette-Félicité Derouineau. He was educated at the Collège Ecclésiastique de Notre Dame in Saint Calais and at the seminary of Le Mans. He witnessed the invasion of his hometown by the Prussian army during the Franco-Prussian War. Dubois was ordained priest on 20 September 1879.

After his ordination he worked in pastoral ministry the diocese of Le Mans until 1898. He was editor of Semaine du fidèle in 1888. In 1895, he was made an honorary canon of the Cathédrale St-Julien du Mans. He served as Vicar general of the diocese of Le Mans from 1898 until 1901.

== Episcopate ==
Pope Leo XIII appointed him Bishop of Verdun on 18 April 1901, with a dispensation as he was the youngest bishop in France. His episcopal motto was Regnavit a ligno Deus. Verdun was one of only two French cities where the bishop was not obliged to leave his palace following the 1905 French law on the Separation of the Churches and the State.

He was promoted to Archbishop of Bourges in 1909, where he actively participated in helping soldiers and their families during the First World War. He served in Bourges until he was transferred to Archbishop of Rouen on 13 March 1916. The seat bears the title of Primate of Normandy. Dubois was a Member of the Academy of Sciences, Belles Lettres and Arts of Rouen.

== Cardinalate ==
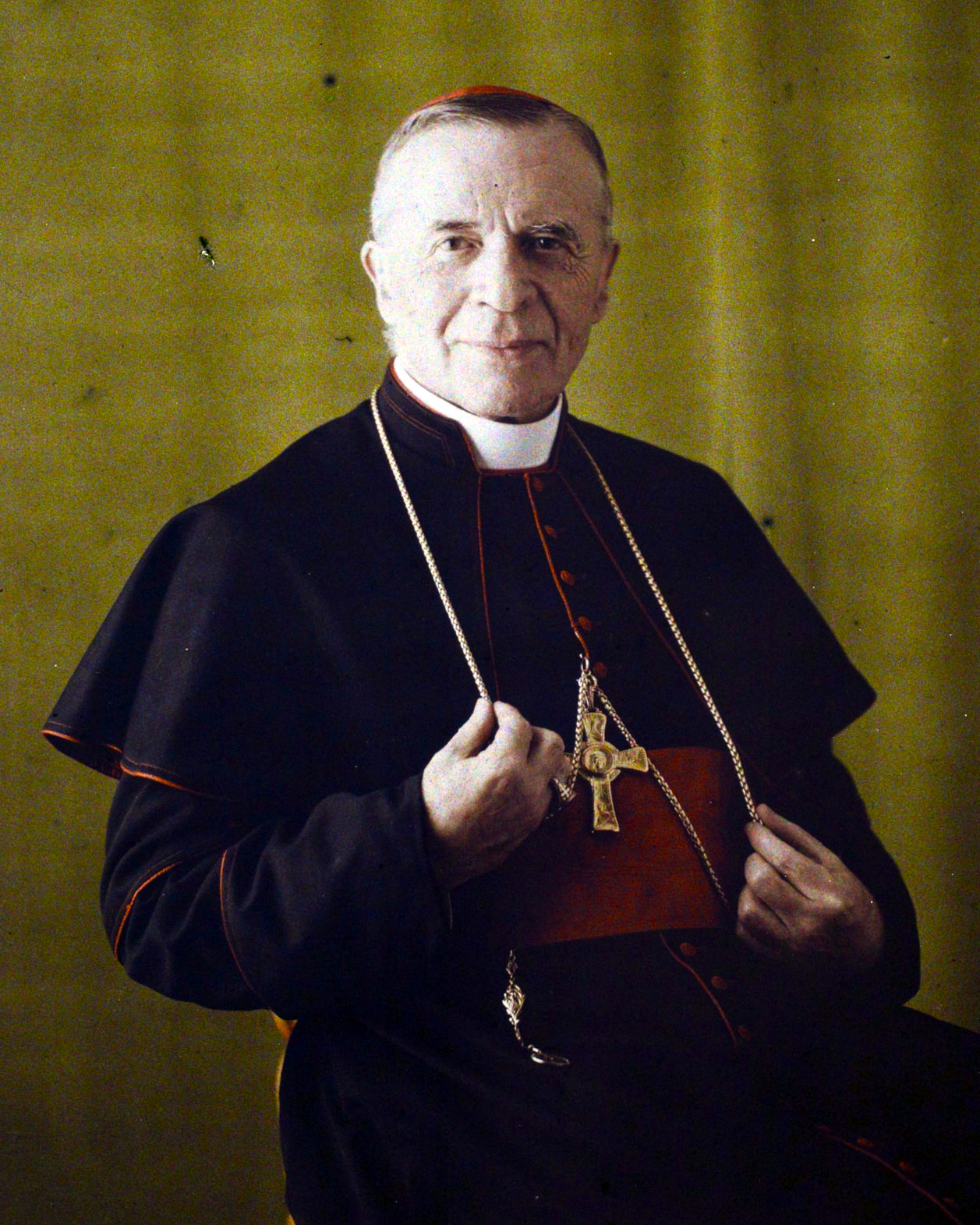
Cardinal Dubois in an autochrome by Georges Chevalier, 1926

He was created Cardinal-Priest of Santa Maria in Aquiro (deaconry elevated pro hac vice to title) in the consistory of December 4, 1916. He headed a French government religious mission to Palestine, Egypt, Syria, Lebanon, Smyrna, Athens, Constantinople and the Balkan countries from December 14, 1919 to March 24, 1920, to assure those areas of France's religious impartiality.

He was transferred to become Archbishop of Paris on 13 December 1920. He took part in the 1922 papal conclave that elected Pope Pius XI. In 1923, Dubois named the Knights of the Holy Sepulchre guardians of the Crown of thorns, a relic acquired by Louis IX of France. (Since the 2019 fire at Notre-Dame, the relic has been at the Louvre.) He was Papal legate to the National Marian Congress in Chartres, May 18, 1926. He traveled to the United States of America and Canada in June 1927.

Dubois played a conciliatory role in relations with French authorities. He established an ordinariate (under auxiliary bishop Emmanuel Chaptal, a descendant of Jean-Antoine Chaptal) to co-ordinate, thereby increasing French clerical control of the work of foreign language Catholic chaplaincies in Paris. In July 1929 he blessed the cornerstone of the Basilique Sainte-Jeanne-d'Arc. He published several works on art history and archeology. He was made a commander of the Legion d'honneur May 27, 1926.

He remained Archbishop of Paris until his death in 1929 at the clinic of the Frères de Saint-Jean de Dieu, Paris.

He is buried in the crypt of Notre-Dame de Paris. His monument, sculpted in marble in 1929, is the work of sculptor Henri Bouchard, and is located in the southeast corner of the ambulatory.

== Anecdote ==
When the existence of the Ecumenical Patriarchate of Constantinople was under threat from the Turkish Government, and the incumbent patriarch forced to leave the country, he led an unofficial mission on behalf of the French Government. The British Government reacted to this incident by sending a naval squadron, thus giving rise to the Perote saying (Pera was the diplomatic and cosmopolitan quarter of Constantinople) "les Anglais ont envoyé de l'acier et les Français Dubois" ("The English sent steel and the French sent Dubois.")

Catholic Church titles
Preceded by Léon-Adolphe Amette	Archbishop of Paris; 13 December 1920 – 23 September 1929	Succeeded by Jean Verdier
