= Joseph Pallache =

Jewish Moroccan merchant and diplomat

- Born: c. 1570; Fez, Morocco
- Died: 1637,1638,1639,1648,1649,1657; Amsterdam, Netherlands
- Burial place: Beth Haim of Ouderkerk aan de Amstel
- Other names: alternative spellings of surname: Joseph Palache, Jozef Pallache
- Years active: 1600s - 1638
- Known for: Moroccan-Dutch trade agreement (1608)
- Notable work: first Portuguese minyan Amsterdam
- Children: Isaac, Joshua, David, Moses, Abraham
- Parent(s): Isaac Pallache of Fez, rabbi
- Relatives: Samuel Pallache (brother) and nephews Isaac and Jacob (Carlos)
- Family: Pallache family

Joseph Pallache (c. 1570 – 1637/1638/1639/1648/1649/1657), was a Jewish Moroccan merchant and diplomat of the Pallache family, who, as envoy, helped his brother conclude a treaty with the Dutch Republic in 1608.

== Background ==
Pallache was born in Fez, Morocco. His father, Isaac Pallache, was a rabbi there, first mentioned in takkanot (Jewish community statutes) in 1588. His brother was Samuel Pallache. His uncle was Fez's grand rabbi, Judah Uziel, whose son Isaac Uziel was a rabbi of the Neve Shalom community in Amsterdam.

His family originated from Islamic Spain, where his father had served as rabbi in Córdoba. According to Professor Mercedes García-Arenal, "The Pallaches were a Sephardi family perhaps descended from the Bene Palyāj mentioned by the twelfth-century chronicler Abraham Ibn Da’ud as 'the greatest of the families of Cordoba'."

Sometime in the first half of the 16th Century, following the Christian conquest of Islamic Spain (the Reconquista), the family fled to Morocco, where Jews, like Christians, were tolerated as long as they accepted Islam as the official religion. How they arrived is unclear. One Italian historian states, "Verso i Paesi Bassi emigra anche la famiglia Pallache, forse dal Portogallo o dalla Spagna, oppure, secundo un'altra ipotesti, dalla nativa Spagna emigra a Fez, dove un Isaac Pallache è rabbino new 1588" (translation: "The Pallache family also emigrated to the Netherlands, perhaps from Portugal or Spain, or, second, another hypothesizes, they emigrated [directly] from their native Spain to Fez, where Isaac Pallache rabbi was in 1588.") (The surname is spelled "Palache" on his death certificate.

== Career ==
After a delegation from the Dutch Republic visited Morocco to discuss a common alliance against Spain and the Barbary pirates, sultan Zidan Abu Maali in 1608 appointed the merchant brothers Samuel and Joseph Pallache to be his envoys to the Dutch government in The Hague. Officially, they served as his "agents", not ambassador. The Pallaches received the support of stadholder Maurice of Nassau and the States-General in The Hague and negotiated an alliance of mutual assistance against Spain. On December 24, 1610, the two nations signed the Treaty of Friendship and Free Commerce, an agreement recognizing free commerce between the Netherlands and Morocco and allowing the sultan to purchase ships, arms and munitions from the Dutch. This was one of the first official treaties between a European country and a non-Christian nation, after the 16th-Century treaties of the Franco-Ottoman alliance.

After his brother Samuel's death in 1616, Joseph inherited his brother Samuel's position as lead agent for Morocco in the Netherlands. When he traveled to Morocco, his son David Palache served as his deputy. During one of his trips to Morocco, he and his son Moses tried to build a new port near Cape Cantin; the effort failed.

== Death ==
[Archive card number] 19218
Name: Palache
Given Name: Joseph
Birth: (-)
Married to: (-)
Wedding date: (-)
Death: 1639 or 1649
Buried: (field) A 13 - 175
Notes: Buried near brother
agent of the King of Barbary
son Moses

Pallache's date of death varies widely in reports. His burial record shows a 10-year discrepancy of "1639 or 1649."

He is buried next to his brother Samuel in Ouderkerk aan de Amstel near Amsterdam. The record for his grave spells his name as "Palache."

== Legacy ==
=== Co-founder of Amsterdam Sephardic community ===
In the first pages of his 1769 Memorias do Estabelecimento e Progresso dos Judeos Portuguezes e Espanhoes nesta Famosa Cidade de Amsterdam, David Franco Mendes records the first minyan in Amsterdam with its sixteen worshippers: Jacob Israel Belmonte (father of Moses Belmonte), David Querido, Jacob Tirado, Samuel Pallache, Ury a Levy, Joseph Pallache, Jacob Uriel Cardoso, Isaac Gaon, Samuel Abrabanel Souza, Jeosuah Sarfati, Joseph Habilho, David Abendana Pereyra, Baruch Osorio, Abraham Gabay, Isaac Franco Medeyro, Moseh de Casserez. Several sources claim this first minyan occurred in Palache's home, as he was the most prominent among them, being envoy from Morocco and occurred around 1590 or Yom Kippur 1596.

=== Family (Mediterranean rabbis) ===
Both Les noms des juifs du Maroc and A Man of Three Worlds describe several generations of Pallache family members, which forms the basis of the family descent shown below.

He had five sons, Isaac, Joshua, David, Moses, and Abraham, among whom Moses and David were the most influential after Samuel's death and more than their own father Joseph.

=== Portuguese-Spanish Sephardic intermarriage ===
Although the authors of A Man of Three Worlds clearly state that neither Samuel and Joseph's generation nor their children's married into the Portuguese (versus Spanish) Sephardic community of Amsterdam, documents in Amsterdam show otherwise. There exist two 1643 marriage certificates for David Pallache and Judith Lindo of Antwerp, daughter of Ester Lindo plus the death details for David. Three years later, in 1646, Samuel Pallache, nephew of David, then marries Abigail (born 1622), sister of Judith Lindo.

== See also ==
- Beth Haim of Ouderkerk aan de Amstel
- Sephardic Jews in the Netherlands
- History of the Jews in the Netherlands
- Morocco–Netherlands relations
- Barbary pirates
- Jewish pirates
- Islam and Protestantism
- Pallache family
- Pallache (surname)
- Samuel ha-Levi (ancestor)
- Moses Pallache
- David Pallache
- Isaac Pallache
- Haim Palachi (descendant)
- Abraham Palacci (descendant)
- Rahamim Nissim Palacci (descendant)
- Joseph Palacci (descendant)
- Juda Lion Palache
- Charles Palache (descendant)

== External sources ==
- García-Arenal, Mercedes; Wiegers, Gerard (2007). A Man of Three Worlds: Samuel Pallache, a Moroccan Jew in Catholic and Protestant Europe. Baltimore: Johns Hopkins University Press. doi:10.1353/book.14092. ISBN 9780801895838.
- García-Arenal, Mercedes (2010), "Pallache Family (Moroccan Branch)", in Stillman, Norman A. (ed.), Encyclopedia of Jews in the Islamic World, vol. 4, Brill
- Rahmani, Moïse (December 1990). "Les Patronymes: une histoire de nom ou histoire tout court" [A Story of a Name or a Short History] (PDF). Los Muestros (in French). Sefard (Institut Sephardi Europeen).
- Laredo, Abraham Isaac (1978). Les noms des juifs de Maroc: Essai d'onomastique judéo-marocaine. Madrid: Consejo Superior de Investigaciones Científicas - Instituto Arias Montano. pp. 966–971.
- "A 400 años de la muerte del sorprendente (¿espía?) Samuel Pallache, con Mercedes García-Arenal Rodríguez". Radio Sefarad.
- Anno: Joodse Marokkaan onder christenen (Dutch)
- Universiteit Leiden: Openingscollege 400 jaar Marokkaans - Nederlandse betrekkingen (Dutch)
- Review van Gerard Wiegers en Mercedes García-Arenal, Man of three worlds. Samuel Pallache, a Moroccan Jew in Catholic and Protestant Europe (Dutch)
- Wereldomroep: Diplomaat, handelaar, kaper en geleerde (Dutch)
