= Samuel Pallache =

Jewish-Moroccan merchant, diplomat and pirate

- Born: circa 1550; Fez, Morocco
- Died: 4 February 1616; The Hague, Netherlands
- Burial place: Beth Haim of Ouderkerk aan de Amstel
- Other names: alternative spellings of surname: Palache, Palacio, Palatio, Palachio, Palazzo
- Years active: 1580s – 1616 (death)
- Known for: Moroccan-Dutch trade agreement (1608)
- Notable work: first Portuguese minyan Amsterdam
- Criminal charge: Piracy
- Criminal penalty: Case dismissed
- Spouse: Reina (Hebrew Malca)
- Children: Isaac (and Jacob/Carlos)
- Parent(s): Isaac Pallache, rabbi
- Relatives: Joseph Pallache (brother) and nephews Isaac, Joshua, David, Moses, Abraham
- Family: Pallache family

Samuel Pallache (Arabic: صامويل آل بالاتش, Samuil al-Baylash, Hebrew: שמואל פלאצ׳ה, Shmuel Palache, c. 1550 – 4 February 1616) was a Jewish Moroccan merchant, diplomat, and pirate of the Pallache family, who, as envoy, concluded a treaty with the Dutch Republic in 1608. His ancestors fled to Morocco during the Reconquista. Appointed as an agent under the Saadi Sultan Zidan Abu Maali, Pallache traveled to the newly-independent Dutch Republic to discuss diplomatic terms with the Dutch against their mutual enemy, the Spanish. He died in the Netherlands, brought there due to the intervention of his ally, Maurice of Nassau, who helped him when he was arrested by the Spanish.

== Background ==
Pallache was born in Fez, Morocco. His father, Isaac Pallache, was a rabbi there, first mentioned in takkanot (Jewish community statutes) in 1588. His brother was Joseph Pallache. His uncle was Fez's grand rabbi, Judah Uziel; his son Isaac Uziel was a rabbi of the Neve Shalom community in Amsterdam.

His family originated from al-Andalus, now Spain, where his father had served as rabbi in Córdoba. According to Professor Mercedes García-Arenal, "The Pallaches were a Sephardi family perhaps descended from the Bene Palyāj mentioned by the twelfth-century chronicler Abraham Ibn Da’ud as 'the greatest of the families of Cordoba'." In the first half of the 16th century, following the Christian conquest of Islamic Spain (Reconquista), the family fled to Morocco, where Jews, like Christians, were tolerated as long as they accepted Islam as the state religion.

Pallache's surname is spelled "Palache" on his death certificate. He signed his name also as "Palacio" and "Palatio"; other Dutch records show "Palatio," "Palachio," and "Palazzo."

== Career ==
Pallache arrived in the Netherlands between 1590 and 1597. In 1591, Middelburg offered him residential permit, but Protestant pastors protested. In 1596 he established one of the first informal Jewish communities in The Hague.

After a delegation from the Dutch Republic visited Morocco to discuss a common alliance against Spain and the Barbary pirates, Sultan Zidan Abu Maali in 1608 appointed the merchant Samuel Pallache to interpret for his envoy Hammu ben Bashir to the Dutch government in The Hague. Officially, Pallache served as the sultan's "agent", not ambassador.

On 23 June 1608, Pallache met stadtholder Maurice of Nassau and the States-General in The Hague to negotiate an alliance of mutual assistance against Spain. On 24 December 1610, the two nations signed the Treaty of Friendship and Free Commerce, an agreement recognising free commerce between the Netherlands and Morocco, and allowing the sultan to purchase ships, arms and munitions from the Dutch. This was one of the first official treaties between a European country and a non-Christian nation, after the 16th-Century treaties of the Franco-Ottoman alliance.

The story goes that, one day, Pallache's horse-drawn carriage met the carriage of the Spanish ambassador in The Hague. The two carriages were unable to pass one another and, to cheers from onlookers, the Spanish ambassador's carriage had to make way for Pallache's carriage.

In addition to his diplomatic affairs, Pallache also continued his activities as a merchant, actively trading between the Netherlands and Morocco. He also got permission from Prince Maurice for privateering activities. The goods obtained through these pirating activities were sold along the Moroccan coast.

== Death ==
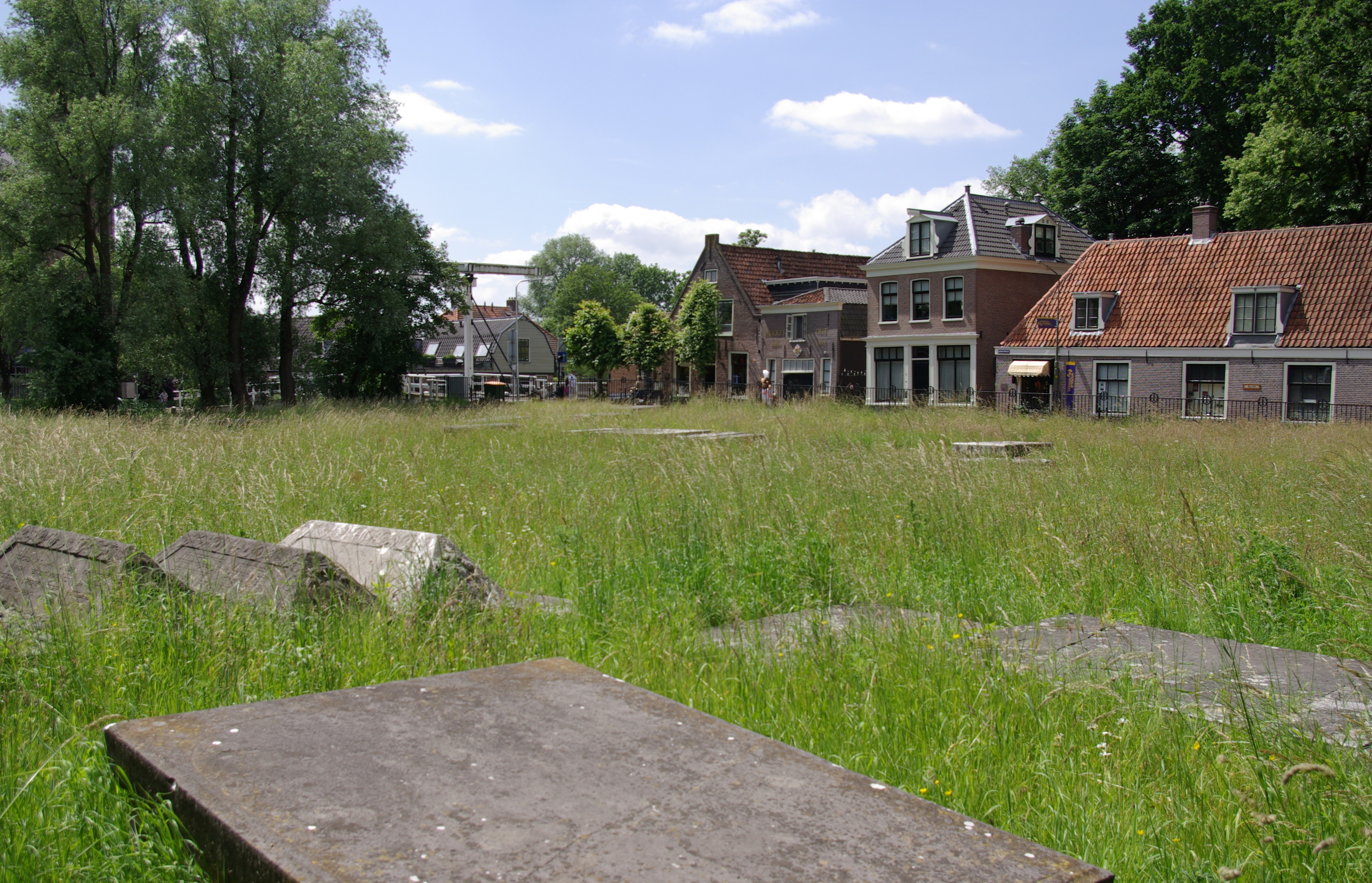
Beth Haim in Ouderkerk aan de Amstel

In 1614, Pallache, having captured a Portuguese ship, was unable to bring its cargo ashore in Morocco and so sailed for the Netherlands. A heavy storm and disease among his men forced him to seek refuge in an English port where, by request of the Spanish ambassador, he was arrested and imprisoned. Eventually, Prince Maurice came to his aid and helped bring him back to the Netherlands. However, he had lost all his money by then and fell ill shortly thereafter.

On 4 February 1616 he died in The Hague, and was buried with a gravestone (image) in the Beth Haim of Ouderkerk aan de Amstel, a "cemetery of the Portuguese Jewish community" in Ouderkerk aan de Amstel near Amsterdam. Thousands attended his funeral. The record for his grave spells his name as "Palache" and describes him as Morokkaans Gezant (Moroccan envoy). It cites a birth place of Fez (Morocco). It states a burial date in Hebrew calendar Sebat 16, 5376 (4 February 1616). It lists three sons: Isaac, Moses, and David. On his tombstone is written in Hebrew "הנושא טוב עם אלוהים ואדם", a verse from the book of Proverbs, which means Carries good with God and man.

== Legacy ==
=== Co-founder of Amsterdam Sephardic community ===
In the first pages of his 1769 Memorias do Estabelecimento e Progresso dos Judeos Portuguezes e Espanhoes nesta Famosa Cidade de Amsterdam, David Franco Mendes records the first minyan in Amsterdam with its sixteen worshippers: Jacob Israel Belmonte (father of Moses Belmonte), David Querido, Jacob Tirado, Samuel Pallache, Ury a Levy, Joseph Pallache, Jacob Uriel Cardoso, Isaac Gaon, Samuel Abrabanel Souza, Jeosuah Sarfati, Joseph Habilho, David Abendana Pereyra, Baruch Osorio, Abraham Gabay, Isaac Franco Medeyro, Moseh de Casserez. Several sources claim this first minyan occurred in Palache's home, as he was the most prominent among them, being the envoy from Morocco and occurred around 1590 or Yom Kippur 1596.

=== Family (Mediterranean rabbis) ===
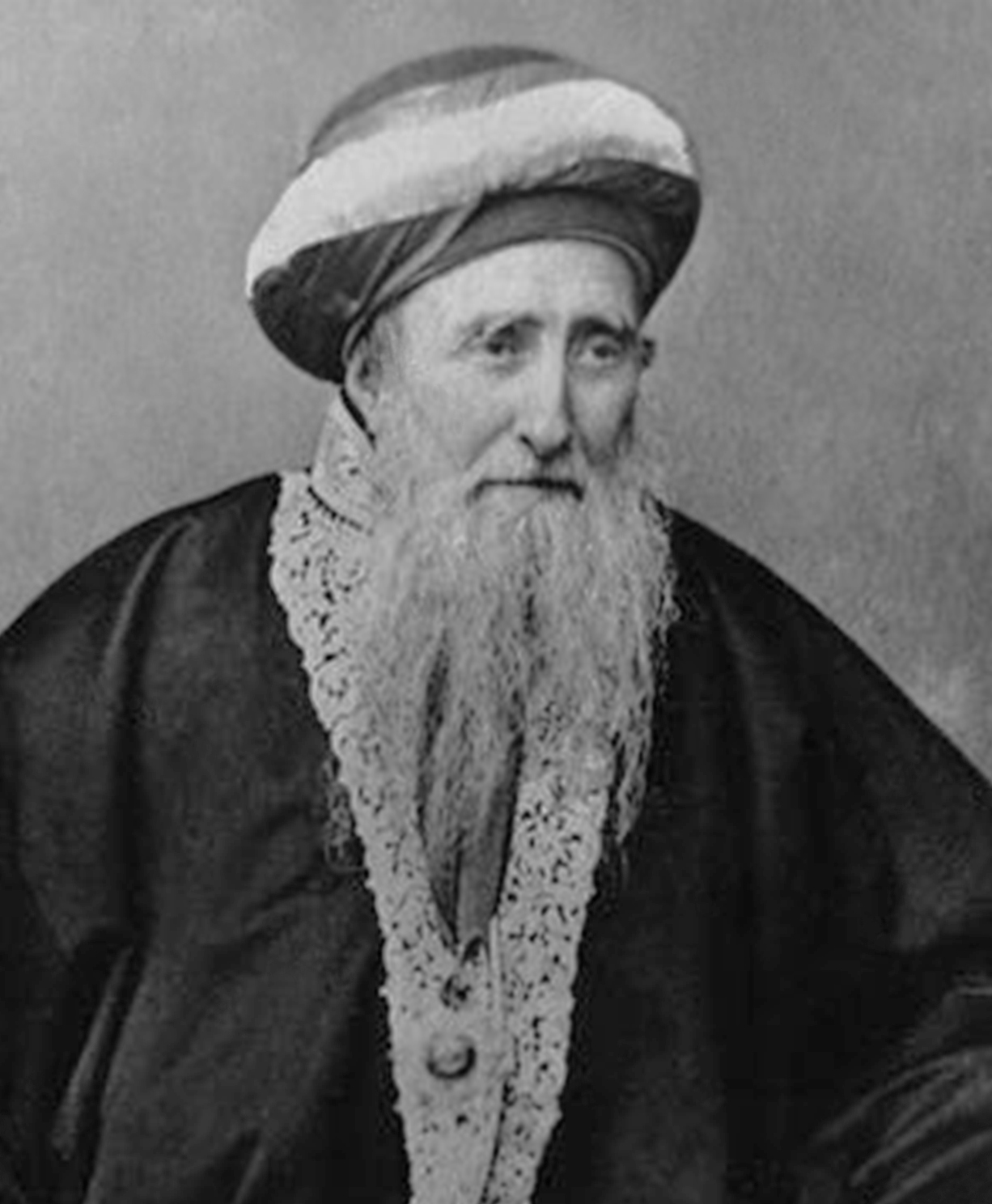
Abraham Palacci, a 19th-century relative of Samuel.

Both Les noms des juifs du Maroc and A Man of Three Worlds describe several generations of Pallache family members, which forms the basis of the family descent shown below.

Samuel's wife was Reina (Hebrew Malca) (English "Queen"). Les noms cites two sons, Isaac and Jacob, One Man cites only Isaac. Samuel's brother Joseph had five sons: Isaac, Joshua, David, Moses, and Abraham. One Man cites Moses (and David) as the most influential person after Samuel's death and de facto leader of the family, even before his own (elderly) father Joseph.

Descendants from the 19th century included four grand rabbis, three in Izmir, Turkey (Haim Palachi (likely), Abraham Palacci, and Rahamim Nissim Palacci) and one in the Netherlands (Isaac Juda Palache)–spellings of the surname varied considerably over the centuries).

In 1896, Samuel Pallache received mention in The Jewish Chronicle: a "Moorish Jew, Samuel Pallache, was also Consul for Barbary and one of the chief figures in the newly-organized Jewish Congregation."

=== "Rabbi Pirate" ===
Publication of A Man of Three Worlds: Samuel Pallache, a Moroccan Jew in Catholic and Protestant Europe in English (Baltimore: Johns Hopkins Press: 2003) and originally in Spanish as Entre el Islam y Occident: La vida de Samuel Pallache, judío de Fez - Between Islam and the Occident: The life of Samuel Pallache, Jew of Fez (Madrid: XXI century 1999) has led to some popular emphasis on Pallache as a pirate.

A main source of this reputation is Edward Kritzler's book Jewish Pirates of the Caribbean (2008), which calls Samuel Palache the "Pirate Rabbi" who "was still capturing Spanish ships in his late sixties." The book led to reviews with titles like "Sephardi Sea Hawks" and "Yo Ho Ho and a Bottle of Schnapps" among other reviews. It has led to continued mentions of Pallache in current-day prints, such as "Merchant, Diplomat, Pirate, Spy Dies in Amsterdam" and "The Pirate Rabbi."

== See also ==
- Sephardic Jews in the Netherlands
- History of the Jews in the Netherlands
- Morocco–Netherlands relations
- Jewish pirates
- Islam and Protestantism

== External sources ==
- García-Arenal, Mercedes; Wiegers, Gerard (2007). A Man of Three Worlds: Samuel Pallache, a Moroccan Jew in Catholic and Protestant Europe. Baltimore: Johns Hopkins University Press. doi:10.1353/book.14092. ISBN 9780801895838.
- García-Arenal, Mercedes (2010), "Pallache Family (Moroccan Branch)", in Stillman, Norman A. (ed.), Encyclopedia of Jews in the Islamic World, vol. 4, Brill
- Rahmani, Moïse (December 1990). "Les Patronymes: une histoire de nom ou histoire tout court" [A Story of a Name or a Short History] (PDF). Los Muestros (in French). Sefard (Institut Sephardi Europeen).
- Laredo, Abraham Isaac (1978). Les noms des juifs de Maroc: Essai d'onomastique judéo-marocaine. Madrid: Consejo Superior de Investigaciones Científicas - Instituto Arias Montano. pp. 966–971.
- "A 400 años de la muerte del sorprendente (¿espía?) Samuel Pallache, con Mercedes García-Arenal Rodríguez". Radio Sefarad.
- Anno: Joodse Marokkaan onder christenen (Dutch)
- Universiteit Leiden: Openingscollege 400 jaar Marokkaans - Nederlandse betrekkingen (Dutch)
- Review van Gerard Wiegers en Mercedes García-Arenal, Man of three worlds. Samuel Pallache, a Moroccan Jew in Catholic and Protestant Europe (Dutch)
- Wereldomroep: Diplomaat, handelaar, kaper en geleerde (Dutch)
