= Moses Cohen Henriques =

Sephardic pirate

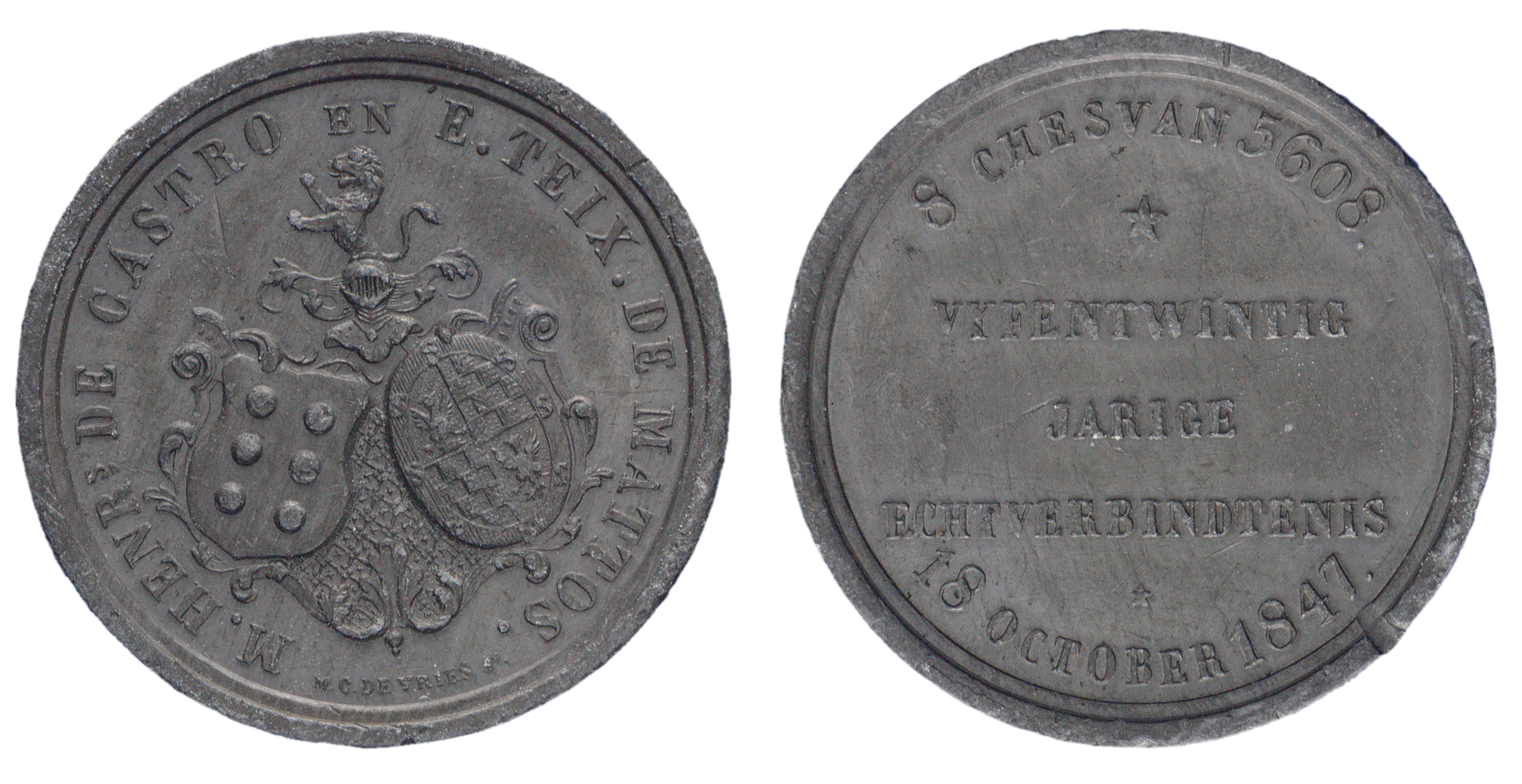

Moses Cohen Henriques (born c. 1595) was a Dutch pirate of Portuguese Sephardic Jewish origin. Operating in as a pirate of the Caribbean, the total haul of his raids on the Spanish is estimated to be about 1 billion USD in today's value.

== Life ==
=== Early life ===
Henriques was born in the late 16th century to a Portuguese converso family (Jews who had undergone forced conversion to Catholicism during the Portuguese Inquisition). To escape religious persecution his family immigrated at a certain stage to Amsterdam, whereupon they resumed the free practice of their Jewish faith.

=== Dutch Navy and privateer ===
Henriques served under Dutch naval officer and folk hero Admiral Piet Pieterszoon Hein, of the Dutch West India Company, rising in the ranks to become his right hand man. He aided in the capture of a Spanish treasure fleet in the battle of the Bay of Matanzas off the Cuban coast, during the Eighty Years' War, in 1628.

Part of the Spanish fleet in Venezuela had been warned because a Dutch cabin boy had lost his way on Blanquilla Island and was captured, betraying the plan, but the other half from Mexico continued its voyage, unaware of the threat. Sixteen Spanish ships were intercepted; one galleon was taken after a surprise encounter during the night, nine smaller merchants were talked into a surrender; two small ships were taken at sea fleeing; and four fleeing galleons were trapped on the Cuban coast in the Bay of Matanzas. After some musket volleys from Dutch sloops their crews surrendered and the Dutch captured 11,509,524 Dutch guilders of booty in gold, silver, and other expensive trade goods, such as indigo and cochineal, without any bloodshed. The Dutch did not take prisoners: they gave the Spanish crews ample supplies for a march to Havana.

=== Dutch colony in Brazil ===
After the war, Henriques scouted the Portuguese colony of Pernambuco on the Brazilian coast. He did this as a spy, in preparation for a Dutch invasion.

Henriques then went on to lead a Jewish contingent in Brazil as part of the Dutch invasion in 1630. He led a force of 3000 men, capturing the colony and turning it into a refuge for Jews during the subsequent Dutch rule.

He was the uncle of Jocob Cohen, a financial adviser and personal secretary to Count Maurice of Nassau, and on 9 February 1634 he wrote a letter to the Dutch West India Company in Amsterdam applying for permission to bring the first large organised group of Sephardi colonists to the Dutch colony in Brazil. The group arrived in 1635 and settled in Vila Velha on the island of Itamaracá.

Henriques was instrumental in bringing a rabbi to the Dutch colony (Isaac Aboab da Fonseca), as well as building a mikvah and synagogue (the Kahal zur Israel synagogue in Recife, Dutch Brazil) - all firsts for the New World. However, in 1654, the Portuguese recaptured the nascent colony in the northern coast of Brazil, forcing Henriques and other Jews to flee from religious persecution. Aboab then returned to Amsterdam, but members of his community immigrated to North America and were among the founders of New Amsterdam, the Dutch settlement at the southern tip of Manhattan. In 1655, Jocob Cohen lived in Manhattan.

=== Piracy ===
After the Portuguese Empire's recapture of Northern Brazil in 1654, Moses Cohen Henriques fled South America and in order to survive difficult times ended up as a trusted advisor to Henry Morgan, the leading pirate of the time. He established his own pirate island off the Brazilian coast, in order to take revenge against the Spanish and the Portuguese. Even though his role as a pirate was disclosed during the Portuguese Inquisition/ Spanish Inquisition, as he was active in the Caribbean against Spain and in Brazil against Portugal. Moses Cohen Henriques was never caught and never faced trial.

After the English conquest of Jamaica, Henriques migrated to the island, where he helped to establish the Jewish community in Jamaica. Morgan, who became the governor of Jamaica, gave Henriques a full pardon in 1681.

== Family ==
Moses Cohen is a forefather of Jamaican dancehall singer Sean Paul and british musician Phil Manzanera.
