= Pallache family =

Sephardic family from Spain

Pallache
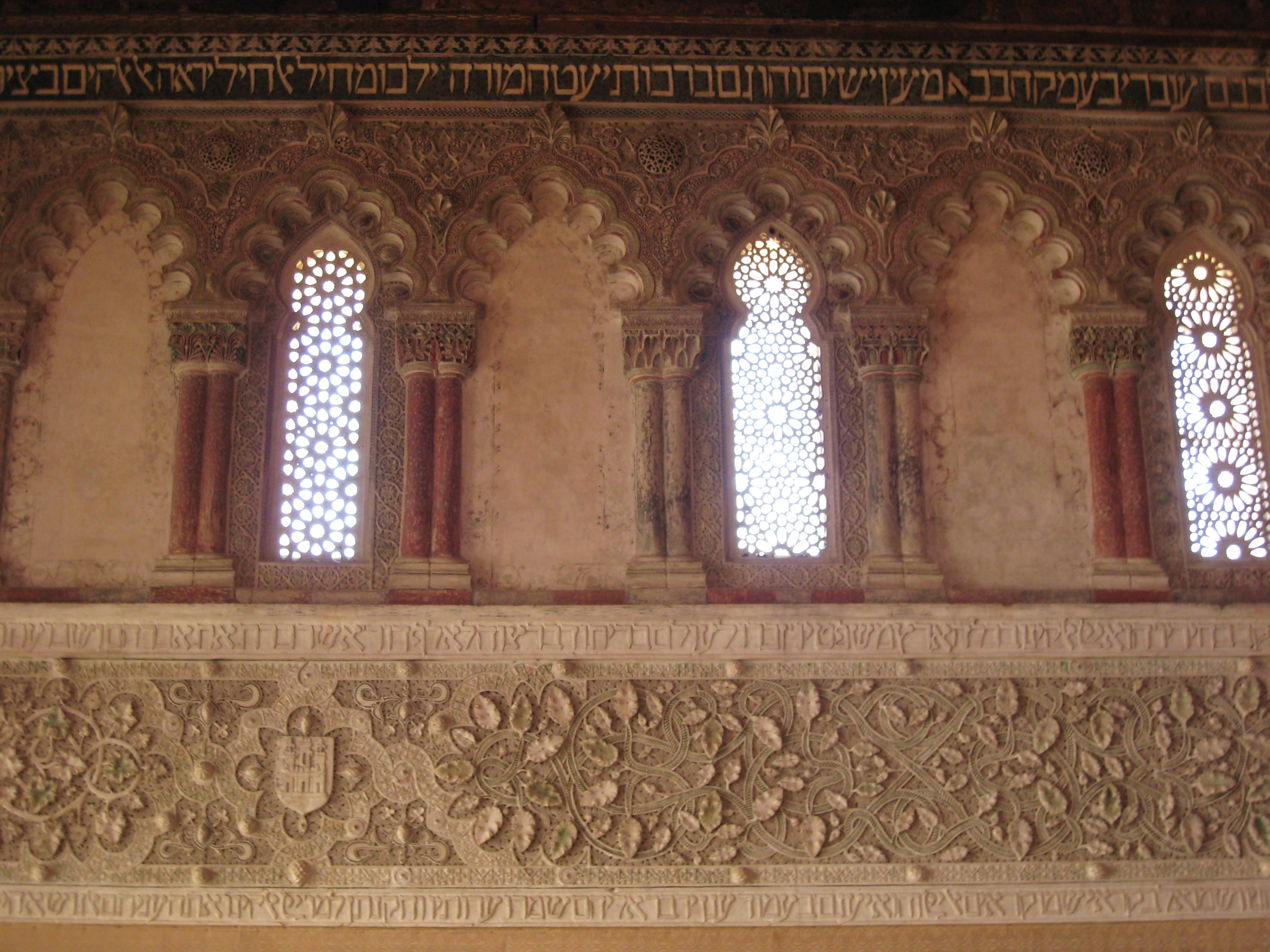
- Interior of Synagogue of El Transito

Origin
- Meaning: Palace(s)
- Region of origin: Iberian Peninsula

Other names
- Variant forms: de Palacio(s) (Spanish), de Palácio(s) (Portuguese), Pallais (French), Palacci (Italian), Palatsi (Greek), etc., all ultimately from Collis Palatium

Pallache, also de Palacio(s), Palache, Palaçi, Palachi, Palatsi, Palacci, Palaggi, al-Fallashi, and many other variations, is a prominent Sephardic Jewish family from the Iberian Peninsula, who spread mostly through the Mediterranean after the Alhambra Decree in 1492, and related events. (Note: This entry uses "Pallache" as an unifying name, based on scholarly preference, particularly three (3) entries for "Pallache" in Brill's Encyclopedia of Jews in the Islamic World and the scholarly historical biography A Man of Three Worlds: Samuel Pallache, a Moroccan Jew in Catholic and Protestant Europe.)

The Pallaches established themselves in cities in Morocco, the Netherlands, Turkey, Egypt, and other countries from the 1500s to the 1900s. The family includes Chief Rabbis, rabbis, founders of synagogues and batei midrash, scientists, entrepreneurs, writers, and others. Best known are Moroccan envoys and brothers Samuel Pallache (c. 1550–1616) and Joseph Pallache, at least three grand rabbis of Izmir – Gaon. Haim Palachi (1788–1868), his sons Abraham Palacci (1809–1899) and Rahamim Nissim Palacci (1814–1907), grand rabbi of Amsterdam Isaac Juda Palache (1858–1927), American mineralogist Charles Palache (1869–1954), and Dutch linguist Juda Lion Palache (1886–1944).

== History ==
=== Inquisitions and expulsions ===
Expulsions of Jews in Europe (1100–1600)

According to historians Mercedes García-Arenal and Gerard Wiegers, the Pallaches "were a family of Hispanic Jews who settled in Fez after the Jews were expelled from Spain in 1492." In 1492, Isabella and Ferdinand issued the Alhambra Decree, ordering the expulsion of practicing Jews from their kingdoms. Jews who had converted to Christianity were safe from expulsion. Some 200,000 Jews converted; between 40,000 and 100,000 fled.

In 1496, King Manuel I of Portugal decreed that all Jews must convert to Catholicism or leave the country. Jews who converted to Christianity were known as New Christians. This initial edict of expulsion turned into an edict of forced conversion by 1497. In 1506, the Lisbon Massacre erupted. In 1535, Portugal launched its own inquisition. Portuguese Jews fled to the Ottoman Empire, notably to Thessaloniki, Istanbul, and to Morocco. Some went to Amsterdam, France, Brazil, Curaçao, and the Antilles. As Portugal was under control of the Philippine Dynasty of the House of Habsburg (1581–1640), the Portuguese Inquisition blended with the Spanish.

The combined Spanish-Portuguese inquisitions caused one of the largest diasporas in Jewish history.

=== Iberia ===
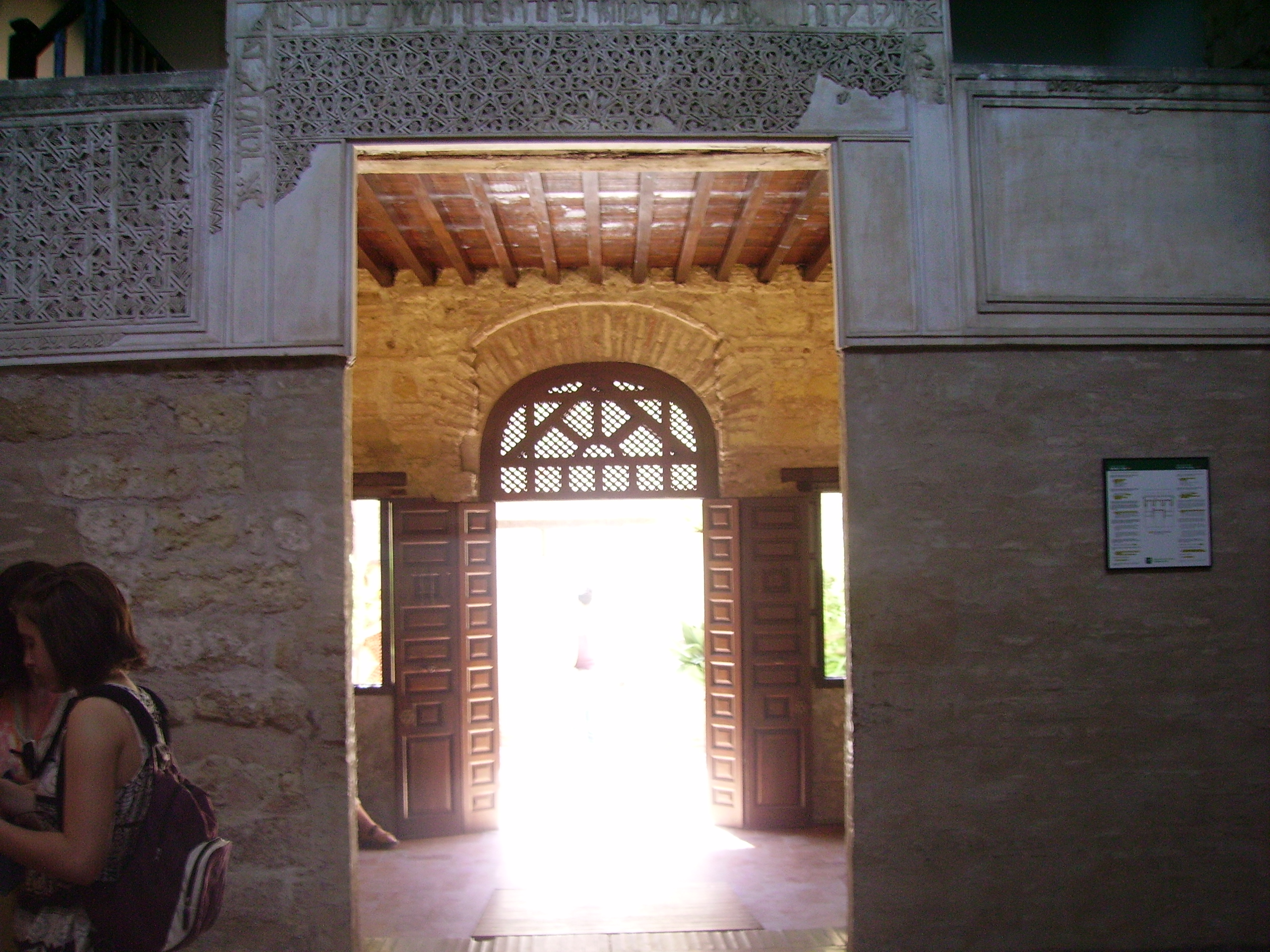
Cordoba Synagogue entrance hall from prayer hall

According to Professor Mercedes García-Arenal, the Pallaches were "a Sephardi family perhaps descended from the Bene Palyāj mentioned by the twelfth-century chronicler Abraham ibn Daud as 'the greatest of the families of Córdoba'".

According to Professor Reginald Aldworth Daly, the Pallaches were "persecuted Sephardim Jews of Portugal who were exiled to Holland".

According to Professor Giovanna Fiume, "The Pallache family also emigrated to the Netherlands, perhaps from Portugal or Spain, or, second, another hypothesizes, they emigrated [directly] from their native Spain to Fez."

José Maria Abecassis cites historian Abraham ibn Daud of Toledo (c. 1110–1180), who wrote:

According to the historian Abraham Ben Daud (Sepher Ha-Qabbalah, 69) the Pallache family was already famous in Cordoba in the 10th century. After expulsion from Spain in 1492, they went to Morocco, where later they branched out to Holland, Turkey, Palestine, and Gibraltar. Other spellings: Palatio, Pallacío, Payachia. Members of this family provided eminent services to Morocco in the 17th century. They distinguished themselves as ambassadors or envoys of the Sultans in Europe, especially in Holland. They established diplomatic relations and created important trade with their country. The Palaçano lived in Portugal before the Expulsion.

=== Morocco ===
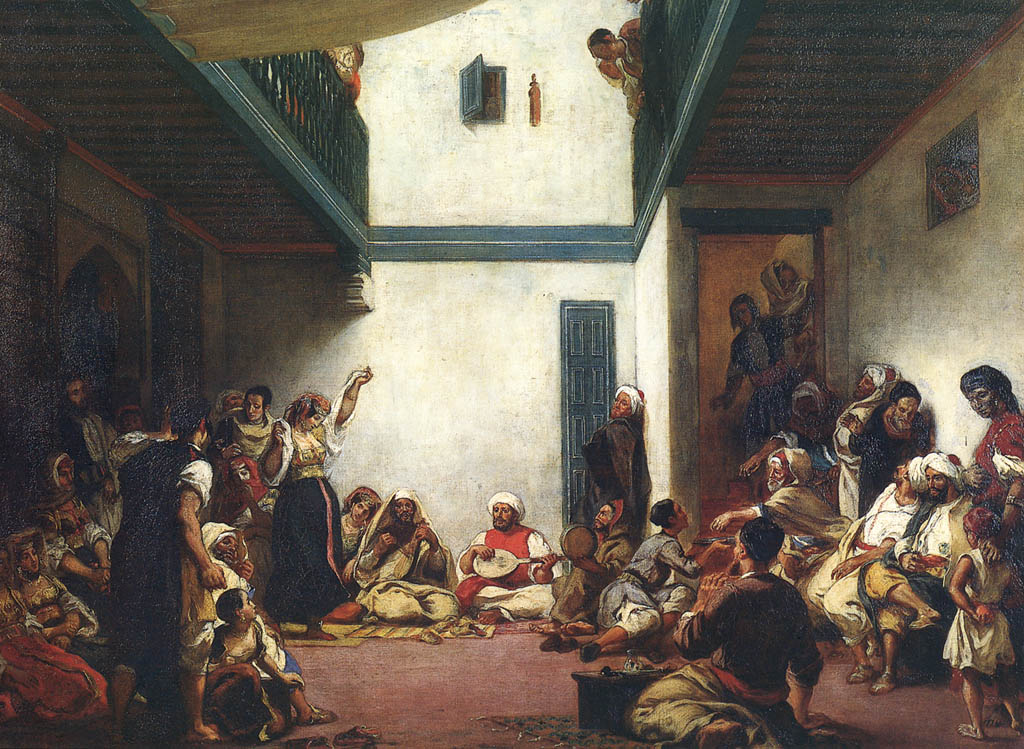
Jewish Wedding in Morocco by Eugène Delacroix, Louvre, Paris

The Jewish presence in Morocco goes back to Carthage, fared moderately, and often prospered under Muslim rule (e.g., the Marinid dynasty). From Morocco, they filtered into Al-Andalus (Islamic Spain, 711–1492) but began to return during the Spanish Reconquista, which mounted in the 10th century. The Spanish-Portuguese expulsions and inquisitions sent Jews back to Morocco on a larger scale. Resultant overcrowding in Moroccan cities led to tension, fires, and famines in Jewish quarters.

Moïse Al Palas (also Moses al-Palas) (???–1535), born in Marrakesh, was a rabbi who moved to Tetuán and lived for a time in Salonica, then in the Ottoman Empire. Before dying in Venice, he published Va-Yakhel Moshe (1597) and Ho'il Moshe (1597), and an autobiography.

Isaac Pallache was a rabbi in Fez, Morocco, first mentioned in takkanot (Jewish community statutes) in 1588. His sons were Samuel Pallache (c. 1550–1616) and Joseph Pallache. Isaac was married to a sister of Fez's grand rabbi, Judah Uziel; his nephew Isaac Uziel became a rabbi of the Neve Shalom community in Amsterdam.

=== Netherlands ===
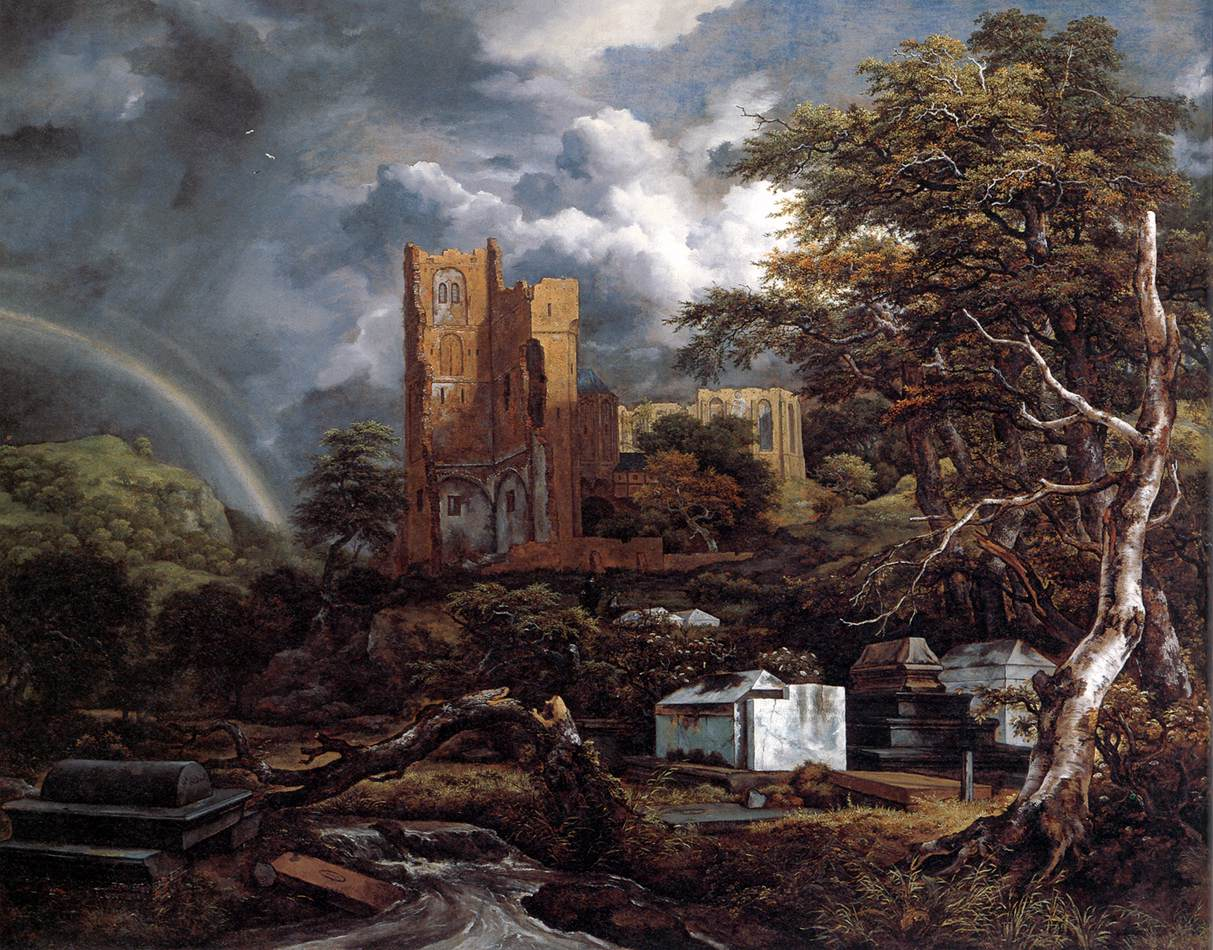
The Jewish Cemetery by Jacob van Ruisdael, where Samuel Pallache, his brother, and descendants lie buried

Jews began to settle in the Netherlands at the end of the 16th century. Thanks to its independence from Spanish control in 1581, the Dutch Republic attracted Sephardic Jews in the Netherlands as a refuge from a common enemy, Spain.

After an unsuccessful attempt to return to Spain in the mid-1600s, Samuel and Joseph Pallache settled a new branch of the Pallache family in the Netherlands by 1608. There, they represented their benefactor, Zidan al-Nasir of Morocco, as well as the Dutch government, in complex negotiations with Morocco, the Netherlands, Spain, France, England, the Ottoman Empire, and other European states – often on behalf of more than one sponsoring state and (as stateless Jews) on their own behalf.

The sons of both brothers continued in their fathers's footsteps, some remaining in the Netherlands (e.g., David Pallache), others returning to Morocco (e.g., Moses Pallache).

In the Netherlands, the surname solidified as "Palache" (a spelling variation which started in the 16th century), and the family continues as Palache in the Netherlands to the present. Prominent members have included grand rabbi Isaac Juda Palache (1858–1927) and his son, Professor Juda Lion Palache (1887–1944).

The Pallache brothers and their sons did not marry members of the Portuguese Sephardic community in the Netherlands. "It seems significant that no male member of the Pallache family ever married a woman from the Portuguese community... it is surely significant that neither Samuel nor any of his heirs were ever to marry into the great trading families of 'the Portuguese nation'." In September 2016, however, two 1643 marriage certificates were discovered for David Pallache (1598–1650) and Judith Lindo (??? – October 30, 1665) of Antwerp, daughter of Ester Lindo In 1646, Samuel Pallache (1616–???), son of Isaac Joseph Pallache and nephew of David Joseph Pallache, married Abigail (born 1622), sister of Judith Lindo.

=== Turkey ===
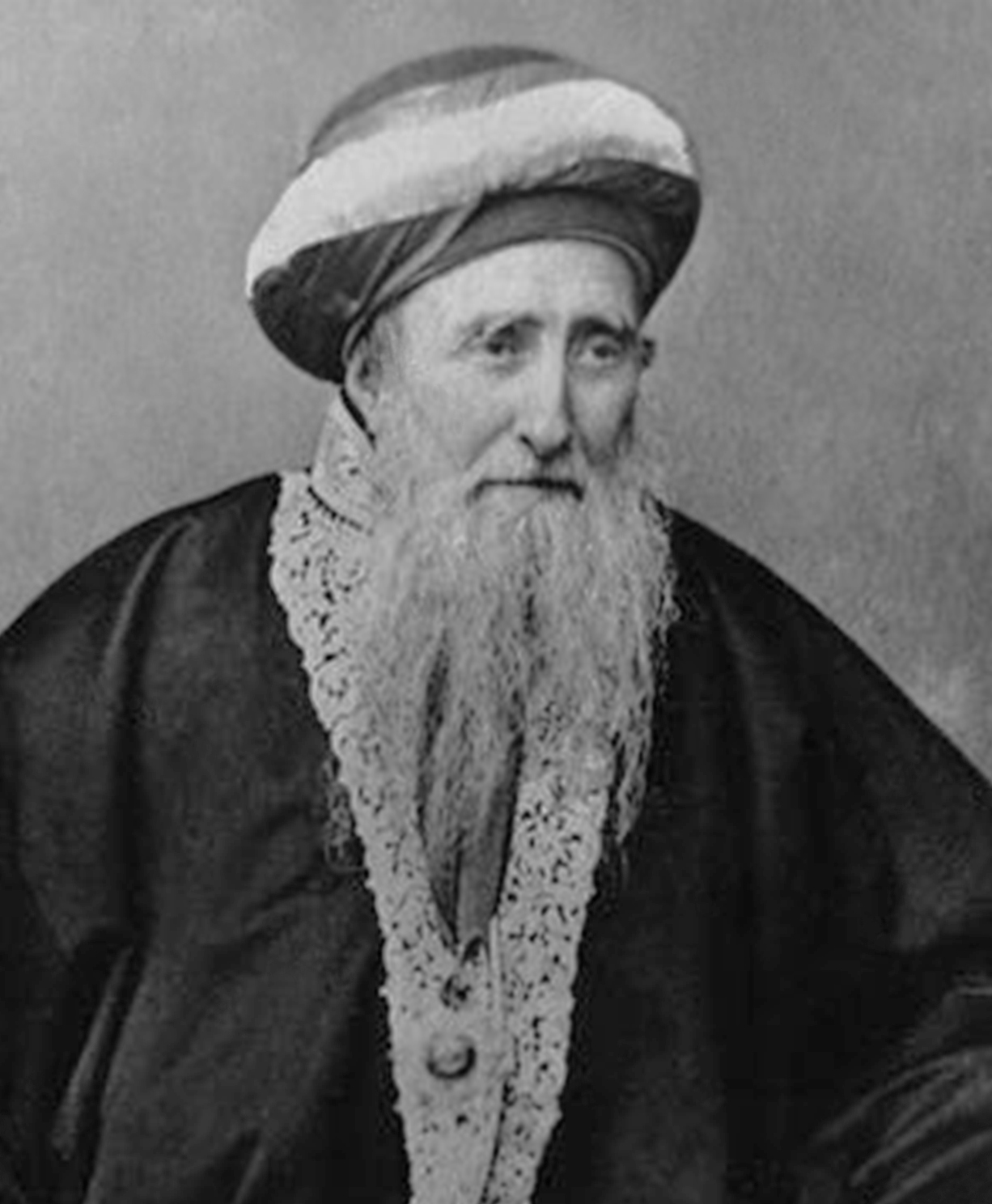
Abraham Palacci

The first reported Pallache in Turkey (then, the Ottoman Empire) dates to 1695, when Isaac Pallache of Leghorn (Livorno, Italy) wrote a letter to the Dutch consul in Smyrna (1695)

The Pallache appear in Izmir (then, "Smyrna") no later than the time of rabbi Jacob Pallache, who married the daughter of a grand rabbi Joseph ben Hayyim Hazan. Jacob's son became grand rabbi Haim Palachi (1788–1868), two of whose sons, Abraham (1809–1899) and Isaac, or Rahamim Nissim (1814–1907), also became grand rabbis there.

According to the Encyclopedia of Jews in the Islamic World:

The Pallache... produced several leading rabbinical scholars in the Ottoman city of Izmir (Smyrna) during the nineteenth and early twentieth centuries. Two of them, Hayyim ben Jacob and his sone Abraham, served as chief rabbi (hakham bashi) and became the focus of a fierce dispute that engulfed the town's Jewish community, while a third, Soloman ben Abraham, contributed to its decline.

In 1863, a London-based Jewish newspaper noted "the chief rabbi of Smyrna, Palacci, a venerable, octogenarian, seems to command universal respect". In 1868, Die Deborah (part of The American Israelite) reported a gather of four rabbis who unanimously supported the wish of the late Abraham Palacci that his son (son not named) be appointed in his place. In 1872, the Bulletin de l'Alliance Israélite Universelle reported on a "real famine" for which relief was sent to Chief Rabbi Palacci to distribute. In early 1873, the name of Haim Nissim Palacci appears as treasurer in Smyrna of the Alliance Israélite Universelle. In mid-1873, the Universal Israelitish Alliance of Paris and the Anglo-Jewish Association of London agreed to establish a school for Jewish boys and girls in Smyrna under the guidance of Dr. Palacci, Chief Rabbi of Smyrna. In 1891, a newspaper reported the a "good likeness" of chief rabbi Abraham Palacci was on its way from Smyrna to Istanbul as part of books sent there. In 1893, a newspaper reported that the importance of a grand rabbi Palacci (which one, unspecified), aided by his son Nissim Palacci.

The Pallache continued in Turkey past the 1922 great fire of Smyrna; some left during Allied evacuation during World War II and were murdered during the Holocaust.

=== Egypt ===
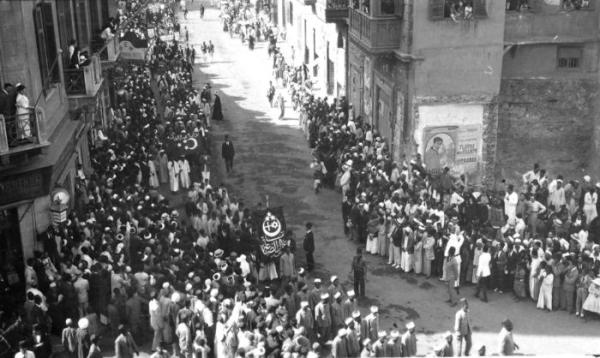
Demonstration in Egypt in 1919

No later than the close of the 19th century, a branch of the Pallache family had settled in Egypt, with some remaining in Cairo into the 1950s.

Which members of the family had what foreign citizenship is as yet undetermined, e.g., Spanish under the Decree-Law of 29 December 1948. Neither "Palacci" nor variations on the surname appear in either the Egyptian or Greek lists.

==== Palacci department store ====
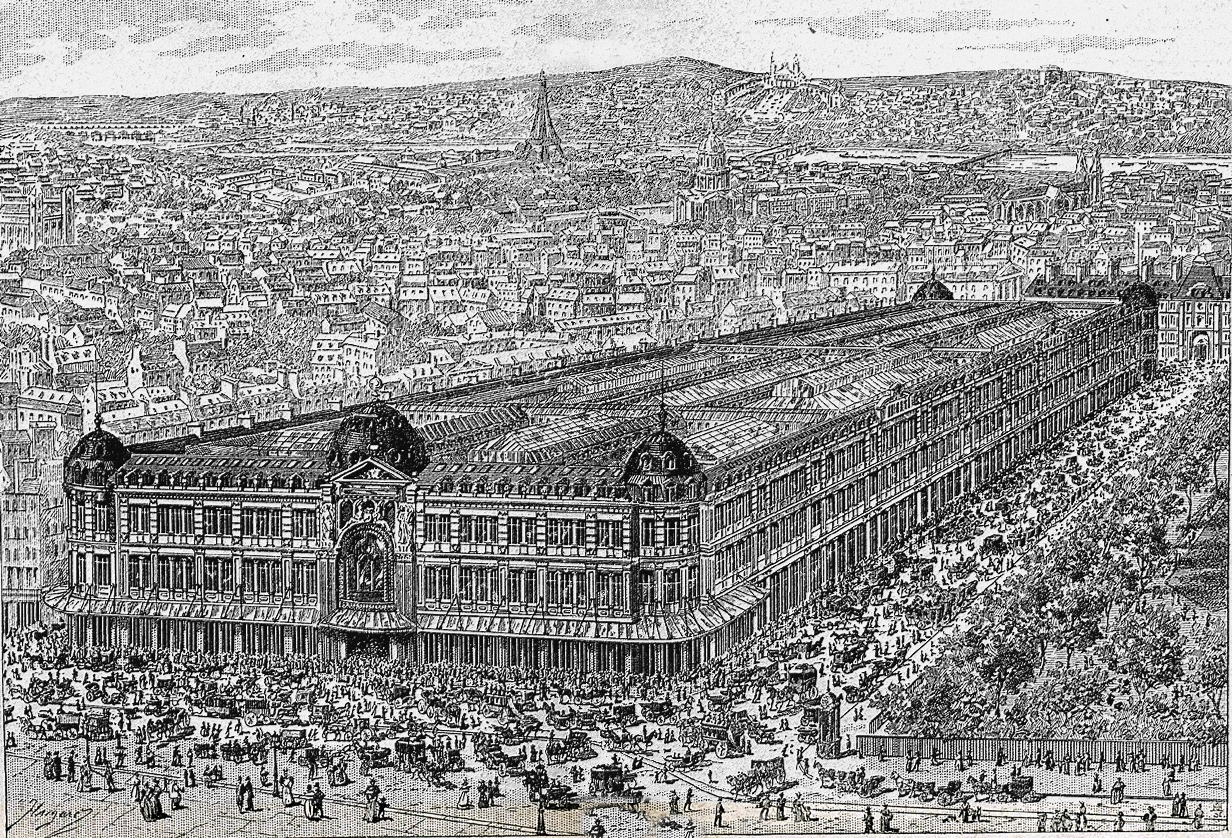
Au Bon Marché came to Egypt and inspired imitators like the Palacci department store

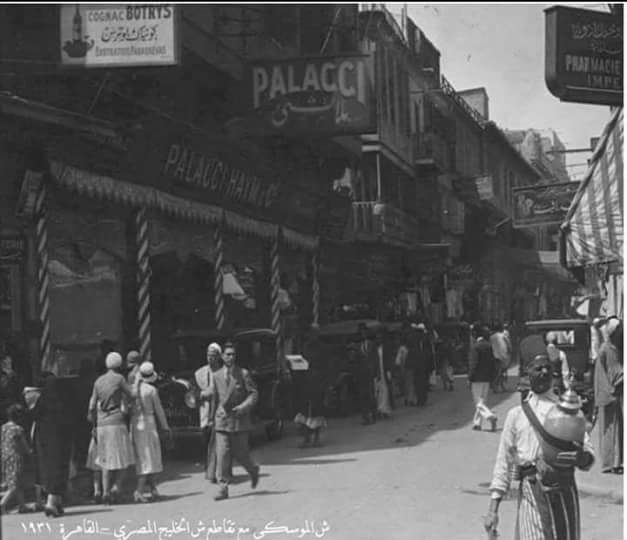
Palacci department store on Musky Street in 1931

In 1897, Palacci brothers Vita, Henri, and family established the Palacci (Arabic: Balaatshi) department store. In 1904, the company's name was Palacci Menasce et Fils. Shortly thereafter, it had become Palacci Fils, Haim et Cie, located on Muski street near the old Opera House. By 1907, Vita Palacci had become head of the store. Also in 1907, newspapers mentions "Mr. Vita Pallacci, the distinguished chief of the house of Palacci Pils, Halm and Co., which is well known in Europe and America" as president of the "Ahemia Society". By 1909, the Palacci had partnered with A. Hayam, and the store employed 20 office clerks and more than 100–120 sales staff. In 1910, "Albert Palacci & Co." appears as a Cairo firm interested in trading in silk. At an unclear date, "Palacci, Menasce & Co." are recorded as having stores in Cairo, Tanta, and Mansoura.

In 1916, "Palacci, Fils, Haym, and Co." were listed among "persons who have been granted licenses to trade in Egypt, with the British Empire, and with Allies of Great Britain". The same year, "Palacci Fil, Haim & Co." filed a suit against "Mohamed Moh. Sélim".

When Vita died in 1917, his oldest son Albert Vita Palacci succeeded as manager. The store had offices overseas in Paris (1922) to purchase draperies and hardware, while its Cairo offices exported household essentials and perfumes. By the mid-1920s, Palacci had branches on Fuad Street and in Heliopolis.

In 1925, the Palacci partook in a "Gran Corso Carnivalesque" in Cairo, organized by the International Union of Commercial Establishment Employees of Cairo, along with 24 other department stores.

By November 1926, it added a new location in Heliopolis. By 1927, it had begun to advertise seasonally or special occasions like weddings, school supplies, carpets, brass beds, shirts, ties, and false collars. In 1928, it dropped Heliopolis as its second location but restored a more French version "Palacci Haym & Cie" as well as the second store in Heliopolis (alternate version "Palacci Haim & Cie.") in the first quarter of 1929, reverting again to "Palacci Haym & Co."

In 1933, the family of Mahmoud Abel Bak El Bitar had a lawsuit against "Pallaci, Haym & Co." By 1935, the Palacci department store had experienced financial difficulties.

In August 1937, the original department store of les "Grand Magasins" Palacci, Haym & Co. on Mouski Street burned; the family did not rebuild.

The 1948 Cairo bombings, which included the Ades and Gattegno stores, did not deter the family; both Albert Vita Palacci and Dr. Victor Palacci appear in a 1955 Who's Who for Egypt, while Henry Menahem Palacci in Cairo appears in the mid-1950s (along with an Albert Palacci in Belgium). By the time Nasser had nationalized all Jewish-owned assets in Egypt (1958), most Palacci had left Cairo in diaspora–yet "Palacci Fils, Hayem et Cie." remained listed as a business in Cairo as late as 1959.

==== Ahemia Society ====
As community leaders, the Palacci supported Jewish causes inside and outside Egypt. In 1907, Vita Palacci was serving as president of la société de bienfaisence a "Hachemia" (from Hebrew Hakham: הכם ḥaḵam, "wise"?):

In 1901, a Jewish mutual aid society was founded in Cairo called the "Hachemia." This institution, which is a charitable organization for Turkish [Ottoman] Jews residing in Egypt, is making positive advances. Since the last fiscal year, Hachemia has provided medical care to a thousand visiting patients at the rate of one piaster (0.25 French francs) per visit, not including patients cared for and covered by Hachemia in several hospitals in Cairo and Alexandria... Last year, Baron Edmond de Rothschild, during his last visit to Cairo, donated 3,000 francs. In 1901, Baroness de Rothschild made a gift in the same amount. The committee leadership of Hachemia is composed of prominent people of Cairo. Mr. Vita Palacci, the distinguished head of the major commercial house Palacci Sons, Haim and Co., well known in Egypt and in Sudan, is the current and committed president of Hachemia. Among the other members of the leadership are: Dr. Beneroya, the editor of the newspaper "La Vara"; Mr. Talvi, an engineer at the Ministry of Public Works, etc.; Dr. Amster, doctor administering health services; and Dr. Isaac J. Levy of Alexandria, doctor at the Jewish Community Menascé Hospital, of Anti-Tuberculosis League, and the Alexandria Municipality. The latter two are honorary members theoretically, actively, and practically.

During 1916–1917, "Palacci Fils, Haym & Co." was one of numerous donors in Egypt to the "Yeshibat Erez Israel (Rabbinical Institution) for the Refugee Rabbis from the Holy Land". This group collected 120,427.5 PT (piasters), routed to its treasurer, E. Anzurat. Donors were from Alexandria, Cairo, "suburbs," England, Australia, Canada, S. Africa, India, France, and the U.s.. The local collector in Cairo was Rabbi Haim Mendelof. The Palacci donated 500 PT, as did Maurice Calamari, I.M. Cattaui & Fils, Le Fils de M. Cicurel, Jaques & Elie Green.

==== Cairo residences ====
The Pallache family settled around the main home of Vita Palacci, a villa ("Palacci-Naggar-Ades Building") at No. 23 Ahmed Basha Street (Ahmad Pasha Street) in Garden City, Cairo. Two of Vita Palacci's grandchildren, Eddy and Colette, have written memoirs of their childhoods in Cairo (and Paris), which document Sephardic Jewish life in Cairo in the 1930s.

==== Alexandria ====
Pallache also settled in Alexandria. "Mordahai Palacci-Miram was likewise a Sephardi but from Constantinople, when he married Rosa Alterman, an Ashkenazi of German origin. Several of their children were born in Constantinople... but to escape an outbreak of plague came to Alexandria..." A "Ventura Palacci-Miram" is also mentioned.

==== Congo venture: La Coupole ====
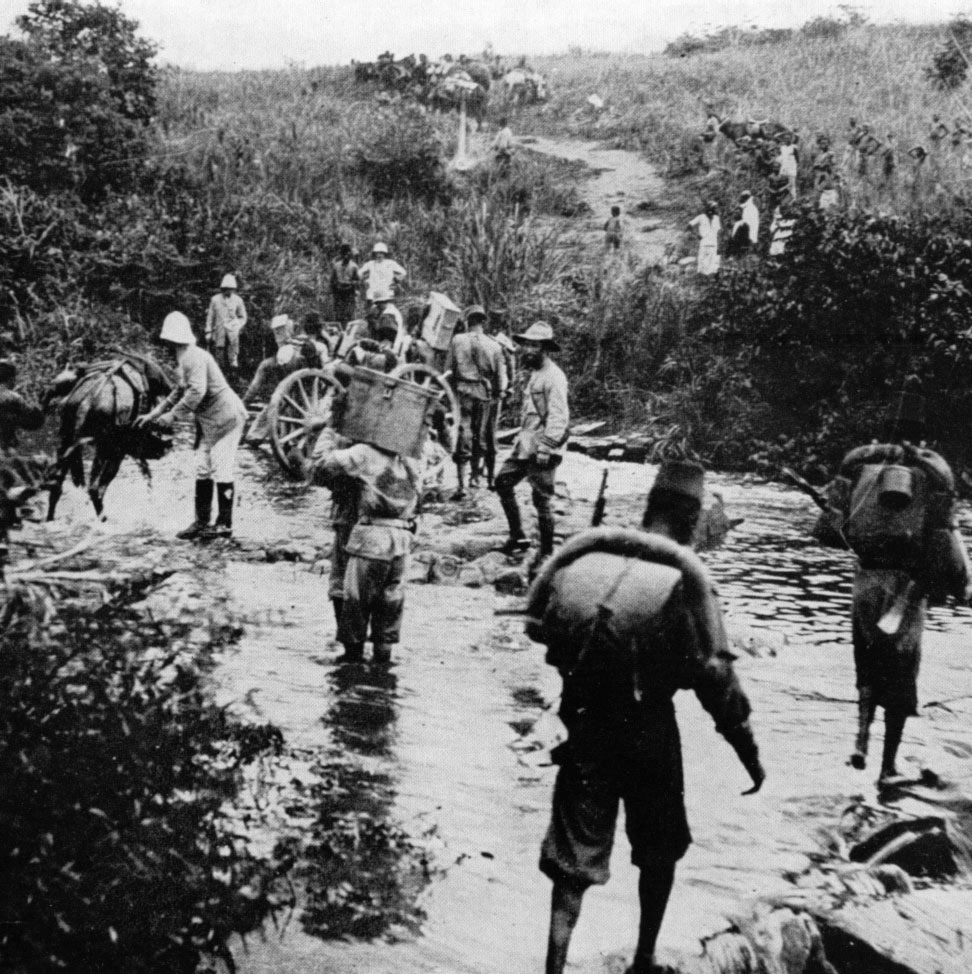
Force Publique in German East Africa (World War I)

In the mid-1940s, Henri Palacci founded "La Coupole" store in Leopoldville, (now Kinshasa) Belgian Congo.

=== Other countries ===
The Pallache had established themselves in Jamaica by the 19th century in the sugar trade. In 1825, the London Gazette posted notice of a partnership that included Mordecai Palache and Alexander Palache "of Kingston, in the Island of Jamaica." A "Charles, son of Mordechai Palache" is recorded in 1847. A prominent Palace at this time was the Honorable John Thomson Palache.

By 1855, a "Vita Palacci" appears in Argentina.

In 1911, Camille Palacci, daughter of the late Aaron Palacci, married Benjamin Bigio in Manchester, U.K.

=== 21st century ===
Continued expulsions and diaspora have dispersed the Pallache family to many countries in the Americas, Europe, and farther afield.

By the 20th century, the Pallache established itself within the U.S. The family of American mineralogist Charles Palache came to California from Jamaica. His descendants include Judith Palache Gregory, a writer, counselor, educator, and permaculturalist.

Numerous Palacci came to the United States in diaspora from Turkey and Egypt, including Colette Rossant.

== Synagogues ==
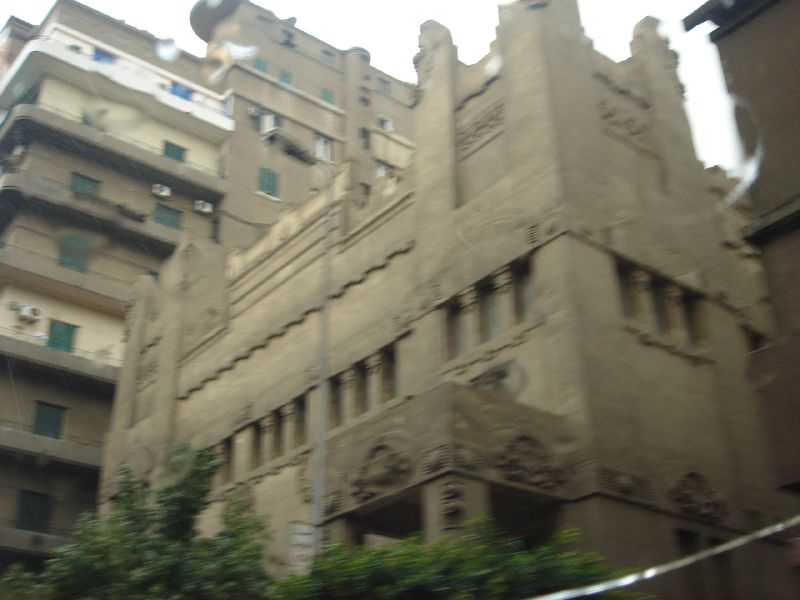
Sha'ar Hashamayim Synagogue on Adly Street in Cairo

=== Netherlands ===
Samuel Pallache may have helped found the first synagogue in Amsterdam. As early as 1769, David Franco Mendes records a first minyan in Amsterdam with sixteen worshippers, including Samuel and Joseph Pallache. Other sources go further to claim that this first minyan occurred in Palache's home, as they were envoys from Morocco and occurred around 1590 or Yom Kippur 1596. However, Professors García-Arenal and Gerard Wiegers point out that the Pallache brothers arrived in Amsterdam in the 1600s decade.

=== Turkey ===
Around 1840, the Pallache home in Smyrna became today's Beth Hillel Synagogue and seat of a yeshiva or beit madras. The synagogue lies in the Kemeraltı marketplace district in Izmir and is named after Haim or Abraham Palacci. Professor Stanford J. Shaw stated it was Haim who founded the Beth Hillel Palacci or his son Abraham. According to Jewish Izmir Heritage, "In the 19th century, Rabbi Avraham Palache founded in his home a synagogue named Beit Hillel, after the philanthropist from Bucharest who supported the publication of Rabbi Palache's books. However, the name 'Avraham Palache Synagogue' was also used by the community." This synagogue forms a cluster of eight extant (from a recorded peak of 34 in the 19th century), all adjacent... [making] Izmir is the only city in the world in which an unusual cluster of synagogues bearing a typical medieval Spanish architectural style is preserved ...[and] creating an historical architectural complex unique in the world." The Zalman Shazar Center also refers to Beit Hillel synagogue as "Avraham Palaggi's synagogue" but then states that "the synagogue was founded by Palaggi Family in 1840" and that Rav Avraham Palaggi "used" it. "The building had been used as a synagogue and a Beit Midrash. The synagogue has not been used since 1960's."

=== Egypt ===
The Palaccis were one of many families that helped maintain the Sephardic Sha'ar Hashamayim Synagogue (Cairo) on Adly Street in downtown Cairo.

== Yeshivas ==
=== Turkey ===
Journey into Jewish Heritage states that Haim Palacci founded the Beit Hillel Yeshiva in Izmir in the middle of the 19th century. Current sources are unclear, but it is likely the same as the Beit Midrash mentioned above.

=== Israel ===
A seminary was named in Haim Palachi's honor in Bnei Brak, Israel.

== Documented spellings of surname ==
As the Pallache settled in new cities with new languages, spellings of the surname changed. Sometimes, the families themselves voluntarily changed their surnames while at other times changes occurred via officialdom. In the 20th century, Turkish officials forced all nationals to adopt surnames under the 1934 Surname Law.

Variations on the Pallache name appear on both Spanish and Portuguese lists of Sephardic names. For instance, "Palacci" is listed as Spanish Sephardic, while "Pallache" is listed as Portuguese Sephardic.

Samuel Pallache's name appeared in several forms–including variations that he himself used. A German Vierteljarhschrift mentions both "Duarte de Palacios" and "Duarte Palache" when referring to the same person, thus making direct equation between the names "de Palacios" and "Palache."

== Family tree ==
=== 16th–17th centuries in Morocco and the Netherlands ===
Moïse Al Palas (???–1535)
Isaac Pallache(???–1560), rabbi of Fez

Isaac Uziel (???-1622), rabbi, nephew of Isaac Palacche
Samuel Pallache (ca. 1550–1616), envoy and dragoman of Morocco

Isaac Palache, co-envoy of Morocco to Poland (1618–1619), consul of the Netherlands to Salé, Morocco
Jacob Palache ("Carlos"), envoy of Morocco to Denmark

Joseph Pallache (ca.1552-1638/1639/1649), envoy and dragoman of Morocco

Isaac Palache, envoy of Morocco to the Ottoman Sultan, later broker in Amsterdam, later served sultan of Morocco (1647)

Samuel Pallache (1616/1618–???), represented his uncle Moses's request to marry levitically the wife of his other uncle David

Yehoshua Pallache (Joshua), co-envoy of Morocco to Poland, tax collector of Salé, Morocco

Manasseh ben Samuel, helped gain the 1656 return of Jews to England from Oliver Cromwell

David Pallache (1598–1650?), envoy of Morocco to King Louis XIII of France, envoy and dragoman of Morocco , and business partner of Michael de Spinoza (father of Baruch Spinoza)
Moses Pallache(???–1650), advisor to four sultans of Morocco: Muley Zaydan, Muley Abd al-Malik , Muley al-Walid, and Muley Muhammad al-Shakh al-Saghir
Abraham Palacci, 17th century merchant to Safi, Morocco

=== 17th–20th centuries in the Netherlands ===
Judah Pallache

Isaac Juda Palache (1858–1927), grand rabbi of Amsterdam, bet din from 1885

Juda Lion Palache (1886–1944), professor of Oriental languages at the University of Amsterdam

=== 17th–20th centuries in the Ottoman empire ===
Isaac Pallache of Leghorn (Livorno, Italy) and later Izmir
Samuel Palacci, died 1732

Jacob Pallache (ca. 1755–1828), 18th century rabbi

Isaac Palacci, brother of Haim
Salomon Palache

Yehoshua Pallache, rabbi of Safed, Israel

Hayyim Pallache (Palagi) (1788–1869), hakham bachi (1858), grand rabbi and kabbalist, member of Communal Council in Istanbul, died February 9, 1869

Abraham Palacci (1809–1899), grand rabbi, funded for Beit Hilel yeshiva 1840, chief rabbi 1869, died 1899

Salomon Palacci, eldest son of Abraham, whose candidacy for grand rabbi failed
Nissim Palacci, son of Abraham, who supported his brother Salomon for grand rabbi

Isaac Palacci, son of Haim a.k.a. Rahamim Nissim Palacci (1813–1907), grand rabbi and author
Joseph Palacci (1819–1896), rabbi and author

Benjamin Palacci 1890, later rabbi in Izmir
Hilel Palacci, member of Izmir communal council 1929–1933
Jacob Palacci, director of choir Choeur des Maftirim in Istanbul 19th–20th century
Nissim Palacci, helped Jewish Hospital Istanbul early 20th century, member of Galata community committee 1928–1931, member Haskeuy community committee 1935–1939

=== 19th–20th centuries in Egypt ===
Vita Palacci (ca. 1865–1917), left Izmir for Cairo, co-founded Palacci department store

Isaac Palacci (1893–1940), Paris-based négocient for Palacci department store

Eddy Palacci (1931–2016)
Colette (Palacci) Rossant (living)

Juliette Rossant (living)

Clement Palacci (1898–1984), Paris-based architect, real estate developer

Henri Palacci, brother of Vita, left Izmir for Cairo, traded in chemical products in Egypt and Sudan

Menahem Palacci, cofounded Palacci department store in Cairo, helped Jews in Egypt become Egyptian citizens in 1922

Henri Palacci, (1917–???)
Albert Palacci, "Mrs." listed as "member of Elderly Center Committee in Cairo" (1938)

=== 17th–20th centuries elsewhere ===
Jacob Pallache, 17th century rabbi of Marrakesh and later Egypt
Abraham Pallache, 18th century rabbi in the Ottoman Empire
Abraham Pallache, 19th century rabbi in Morocco
Samuel Pallache, 18th century rabbi in the Netherlands

Moshe Samuel Palache (???-1859), rabbi in Jerusalem

Palache of Jamaica and USA

James Palache (1834–1906)

Whitney Palache (1866–1949)

James Palache (died 1918)
John Garber Palache

Charles Palache (1869–1954)

Alice Palache Jones (1907–1989)
Mary Palache Gregory

Judith Palache Gregory (1932–2017)

Palatchi whose branches moved from Turkey to Spain or Latin America:

Spain: Alberto Palatchi
Argentina: Gabriel Palatchi Henri Palacci/Palatchi (1898–???), deported from Istanbul to France in 1942

Isaac Palacci/Palatchi (1900–???), deported from Istanbul to France in 1942

=== Holocaust victims ===
- Sarah Palatchi (1904 – 1944), born Sarah Kabili in Turkey, deported to Drancy internment camp in France, murdered in Auschwitz.
- Mordecai Palatchi/Palacci (1903–1942), born in Turkey and deported to Drancy internment camp
- David Palachi (1905 – 1943), born in Algeria, deported to Nice, sent in 1943 to Auschwitz and murdered.
- Jean Palatchi (1926 – ???), deported to Drancy internment camp; survived the Holocaust.
- Bella Palatsi (1896 – 942), born in Greece, deported to Drancy, sent in 1942 to Auschwitz and murdered.
- Maurice Palatsi (1923 – 1944), born in France, fight on Tulle, France, and murdered.

Famille Palatsi.

== See also ==
- Pallache (surname)
- Isaac Pallache
- Cristina (singer), daughter of Jacques Palaci
