= History of the Jews in Jamaica =

Jamaican Jews יהודים ג'מייקינים
Total population
- 506

Regions with significant populations
- Jamaica

Languages
- English, Jamaican English, Jamaican Patois, Judaeo-Spanish, Hebrew

Religion
- Judaism

Related ethnic groups
- Hershkovitch from Sanok Poland.

The history of the Jews in Jamaica predominantly dates back to migrants from Spain and Portugal. Starting in 1509, many Jews began fleeing from Spain because of the persecution of the Holy Inquisition. By 1611, the Island of Jamaica had reached an estimated population of 2,500 people. When the English captured Jamaica from Spain in 1655, the Jews who were living as conversos began to practice Judaism openly.

== History ==
The first Jews came to the island during the Spanish occupation of the Island, 1494–1655. With the influx of Jews to Jamaica in the 17th century, multiple synagogues were constructed across the island in such cities as Montego Bay, Spanish Town, Port Royal, and Kingston. A synagogue built in Spanish Town, the Sephardic Kahal Kadosh Neveh Shalom ("Habitation of Peace"), was consecrated in 1704. Jews came from Spain and Portugal, having fled the Spanish Inquisition. During the Spanish Inquisition, the Spanish government required the Jews to leave the country or convert to Catholicism. The punishment for disobedience was death. To conceal their identity they referred to themselves as "Portuguese" or "Spanish" and practiced their religion secretly. At the time of the English conquest of the island in 1655, General Robert Venables recorded the presence of many "Portuguese" in Jamaica. Details pertaining to how many times or any of these Portuguese were Jews or New Christians is unknown. Also, it is unclear how many of these possible New Christians converted to Judaism. The Portuguese on the island were often persecuted by the Spanish and so many helped the English with their invasion. The Jews were allowed to remain after the conquest and began to practice their religion openly. They were granted English citizenship by Oliver Cromwell, which was confirmed in 1660 by King Charles II of England. For many Jews, Jamaica became a safe place they could live in without fear of persecution. Jews from Amsterdam, Bordeaux, and Bayonne moved to Jamaica, mostly residing in Port Royal. Port Royal even had what was called a Jew Street. In 1672 thirty-one Port Royal merchants petitioned the governor complaining of large numbers of Jewish retail merchants active on the island.

Abraham Blauvelt was a Dutch-Jewish pirate, privateer, and explorer of Central America and the western Caribbean, after whom the towns of Bluefields, Nicaragua, and Bluefields, Jamaica, were both named.

In 1719, the synagogue Kahal Kadosh Neve Tsedek was built. It was originally planned to turn Jamaica into an agricultural powerhouse, but this plan failed. However, for local merchants, Port Royal became a successful center for trade. Port Royal became an attractive place to trade commodities such as gold, silver, porcelain, embroidery, and silk. The Jews participated as well, particularly in the trade of silver and gold, and in money-changing. This success, however, led to a backlash. English-Jamaican merchants accused Jamaican Jews of coin clipping, a method of shaving off precious metal from money and putting it back into circulation at face value. Such accusations occurred many times. This resentment led to the coalition of a Legislative Council that represented English-Jamaican merchants and planters in 1691. For example, the Council petitioned to the Crown that Jamaican Jews were evading taxes. Some have found these accusations to be false or exaggerated because the Jews did not play a large role in the economics of Port Royal.

In 1815, a fire nearly destroyed all of Port Royal. Many Jews left Port Royal for another Jamaican town called Kingston, where a new economy was flourishing with commercial success. The Jews in Kingston provided four Mayors, many Justices of Peace, members of Parliament, and countless builders, dentists, doctors, teachers, lawyers, and actors. The community of Ashkenazi Jews in Kingston were called "The English and German Congregation." In 1787, they built a synagogue called Shangare Yosher. There had been an Ashkenazi synagogue in the nineteenth century called Rodphei Zadek, but it was later united with a Sephardic congregation in 1850. By 1720, 18 percent of the population of Kingston was Jewish. For the most part, Jews practiced Orthodox rituals and customs. Among the Jewish community's religious leaders during the early 1800s was the Rev. Dr. Isaac Lopez (1780-1854). Born in Curacao, he came to Kingston where he served the congregation there, assisted for a time by Abraham Pereira Mendes who was later called to be the minister of the Montego community.

At the beginning of the twentieth century, the Jewish population began introducing Progressive Judaism into their rituals. Progressive Judaism had a combination of reform and conservative rituals. Since the Inquisition made its way to many parts of the New World, Jamaica offered a type of haven for the Jews. The Jews in Jamaica felt at peace with life even though they still faced certain restrictions such as not being able to vote or hold office. In 1826, however, free people of color were on track to gain equal rights to others in Jamaica, and the Jewish community noticed the possible threat of being the only group in Jamaica without voting rights.

Thus, the Jews decided to fight for their right through petitions to the English government. They attained full political rights in 1831. The status of British citizenship enabled ownership of property by the Jews.

This victory proved to be significant not just for the Jews of Jamaica but also elsewhere. In 1832, Jews in London used the victory in Jamaica as reasoning for their own rights to such freedoms. That same year in Canada, a similar story unfolded as Jews were granted same political rights as their Christian counterparts.

Jamaica's Jewish population was never large. However, their contribution to the economic and commercial life of the nation has been significant.

=== Modern times ===
Only 506 people are religiously practicing Jews in Jamaica and most Jews have migrated out of Jamaica. While many are non-practicing, it is recorded that over 2,000 Jamaicans religiously identify as Jews.

Common Jewish surnames in Jamaica with mostly Portuguese origin are Abrahams, Alexander, Andrade, Barrett, Babb, Benjamin, Bent, Carvalho, Codner, D'Aguilar, Israel ,DeCosta, De La Roche, Da Silva, De Souza, Pimentel, De Cohen, De Leon, Delisser, DeMercado, Eben, Fuertado, Henriques, Ibanez, Isaacs, Levy, Lindo, Lyon, Machado, Morais, Matalon, Mendes, Myers, Magnus, Nunes, Pimentel, Reuben, Rodriques, Sangster. Some of these surnames were then made to sound more English, in order to 'blend' with the British-Jamaican community. An example would be De La Roche being changed to Roach(e) and Eben /Ibanez changed to Ebanks.

The Chabad-Lubavitch movement opened a branch in Jamaica in 2014 servicing locals as well as a welcome centre for international visitors.

=== Institutions ===
The Shaare Shalom Synagogue in Kingston, first built in 1885, was the only synagogue in the country until 2014 when Chabad opened the second synagogue in Montego Bay. The congregation has its own siddur, blending together Spanish-Portuguese tradition and British Liberal and American Reform liturgy. The Hillel Academy, a private school founded by the Jewish community, today is non-denominational but still serves as a meeting place for the children of the Jewish community. A Jamaican Jewish Heritage Center opened in 2006 in celebration of 350 years of Jews living in Jamaica. At least 21 Jewish cemeteries also exist in the country.

== Notable people with Jamaican Jewish ancestry ==
- Ivan Barrow - test cricketer
- Harry Belafonte - American singer, songwriter and actor (Jewish grandfather)
- Chris Blackwell - record label founder and owner (Jewish mother)
- Jacob De Cordova - founder of the Jamaica Daily Gleaner newspaper
- H. G. de Lisser, CMG - prominent author and journalist, editor of Jamaica Daily Gleaner newspaper
- R. James deRoux - Jamaican Businessman and Custos Rotulorum of Clarendon
- Moses Cohen Henriques - pirate, escapee from Spanish Inquisition
- Blanche Blackwell - Jamaican Heiress
- Myer Lyon - hazzan and opera tenor
- Charles Palache - mineralogist, descended from Jamaican landowner and grandfather John Palache
- Sean Paul Francis Henriques - Jamaican dancehall/reggae singer (Jewish grandfather)
- George Stiebel - trader, entrepreneur and black millionaire
- Yehoshua Sofer - Jewish martial artist and hip hop recording artist
- Jenna Wolfe - American journalist raised in Haiti and born in Jamaica to a Puerto Rican Jewish father and an American Jewish mother from New Jersey
- Richard Henriquez - Architect
- Mayer Matalon - Jamaican Businessman
- Gloria Reuben
- Nicole Lyn

== See also ==
- Charles Palache
- Pallache family
- Lindo family
