= Isaac Pallache =

Moroccan businesspeople (1593–1650)

Isaac Pallache (1593–1650) was born in 1593, possibly in Fez, Morocco, son of Joseph Pallache and nephew of Samuel Pallache. He came from the Sephardic Pallache family.

== Career ==
Pallache studied at the University of Leiden, where he registered February 21, 1629.

With his brother Abraham, he served as an agent from the Netherlands to Morocco on his father's behalf.

== Personal and death ==
Pallache converted to Christianity before 1629.

Little is known about his death.

== See also ==
- Sephardic Jews in the Netherlands
- History of the Jews in the Netherlands
- History of the Jews in Morocco
- Morocco–Netherlands relations
- Pallache family
- Pallache (surname)
- Samuel Pallache
- Joseph Pallache
- David Pallache
- Moses Pallache
- Juda Lion Palache
- Charles Palache
