= David Pallache =

Moroccan businesspeople (1598–1650)

David Pallache (1598–1650) was born in Fez, Morocco, one of five sons of Joseph Pallache and nephews of Samuel Pallache. He came from the Sephardic Pallache family.

== Career ==
Pallache worked with his father in trading activities and as an agent of Moroccan state at the time. When his father traveled and stayed in Morocco, David served as his deputy in the Netherlands. In 1621, he helped negotiate a peace treaty for Morocco with France. From 1630 onwards, he took over from his brother Abraham as unofficial Dutch consul in Safi, Morocco. In 1634, apparently to clear some debts, he became involved commercially with Michael Spinoza (father of philosopher Baruch Spinoza).

He also served as agent to France, where in 1634 when Louis XIII demanded his father's extradition, after which David succeeded him in 1637.

== Personal and death ==
The scholarly biography A Man of Three Worlds: Samuel Pallache, a Moroccan Jew in Catholic and Protestant Europe did not find intermarriage between the Pallache brothers or sons and members of the Portuguese Sephardic community in the Netherlands. In fact, it documents the contrary, e.g., that sons Isaac and Joshua did not go make such marriages. "It seems significant that no male member of the Pallache family ever married a woman from the Portuguese community... it is surely significant that neither Samuel nor any of his heirs were ever to marry into the great trading families of 'the Portuguese nation'." In September 2016, however, two 1643 marriage certificates were discovered for David Pallache and Judith Lindo of Antwerp, daughter of Ester Lindo Death details for David Pallache also confirm the marriage. Further, three years later, in 1646, Samuel Pallache, nephew of David, married Abigail (born 1622), sister of Judith Lindo.

He died in Amsterdam in 1650 and was buried in Ouderkerk in the family grave.

== See also ==
- Sephardic Jews in the Netherlands
- History of the Jews in the Netherlands
- History of the Jews in Morocco
- Morocco–Netherlands relations
- Pallache family
  - Pallache (surname)
  - Samuel Pallache
  - Joseph Pallache
  - Isaac Pallache
  - Moses Pallache
  - Juda Lion Palache
  - Charles Palache
