= Moses Pallache =

Dutch merchant and diplomat (died 1650)

- Died: 1650; Morocco
- Other names: alternative spellings of surname: Moïse Pallache, Mozes Pallache
- Known for: Moroccan-Dutch trade agreement (1608)
- Parent: Joseph Pallache
- Relatives: Brothers Isaac, Joshua, David, Abraham; uncle Samuel Pallache; cousins Isaac and Jacob (Carlos)
- Family: Pallache family

Moses Pallache (died 1650), was a Jewish-Moroccan-born merchant and diplomat of the Pallache family, who emerged as leader of his second generation.

== Background ==
Pallache was born to father Joseph Pallache; his uncle was Samuel Pallache.

He studied languages at the University of Leiden without registering there.

== Career ==
Thanks to his many languages known, as a young man he was able to help his father and uncle prepare important negotiations, for which they rewarded him.

The States General of the Netherlands considered him a jeune homme de bonne expectation et fort qualifié et entendu en affaires et plusieurs langages ("young man of good prospects, very qualified, and knowledgeable in business affairs and several languages").

He partook in a mission to Istanbul (1614-1616).

After the death of his uncle Samuel, he went to live in Morocco and served at the court of Fez, where 1622–1642 he served as European secretary and interpreter. He became a chief interpreter and translator from Spanish, Dutch, and French into Arabic for the rules of Morocco. During those years, he served under four sultans of Morocco (1618 to 1650): Muley Zaydan (1603–1627), Muley Abd al-Malik (1623–1627), Muley al-Walid (1631–1636), and Muley Muhammad al-Shakh al-Saghir (1636–1655). "He became a very important and influential figure at the Moroccan court, responsible for international and diplomatic dealings."

In 1656, Menasseh ben Israel wrote, 'In the Kingdom of Barbary, their [sic] lives also a great number of Iews ... at Marrocco, the Court and Kings house, where they have their Naguid or Prince that governs them, and is their Iudge, and is called at this day, Seignor Moseh Palache'.

His name appears in English records from 1636 to his death. It also appears in the Spanish translation of a 1638 treaty between the English and Moroccans.

His prominence in Morocco led many relatives to return there from the Netherlands, including his brothers Joshua and Abraham. Joshua became a tax official. Abraham set up in the port of Safi, where he provisioned ships and served as unofficial consult for the Dutch.

== Death ==
Pallache probably died in Morocco around 1650.

== See also ==
- Sephardic Jews in the Netherlands
- History of the Jews in the Netherlands
- History of the Jews in Morocco
- Morocco–Netherlands relations
- Islam and Protestantism
- Pallache family
- Pallache (surname)
- Samuel ha-Levi (ancestor)
- Samuel Pallache (uncle)
- Joseph Pallache (father)
- David Pallache (brother)
- Isaac Pallache (brother)
- Haim Palachi (descendant)
- Abraham Palacci (descendant)
- Rahamim Nissim Palacci (descendant)
- Joseph Palacci (descendant)
- Juda Lion Palache
- Charles Palache (descendant)

== External sources ==
- García-Arenal, Mercedes; Wiegers, Gerard (2007). A Man of Three Worlds: Samuel Pallache, a Moroccan Jew in Catholic and Protestant Europe. Baltimore: Johns Hopkins University Press. doi:10.1353/book.14092. ISBN 9780801895838.
- García-Arenal, Mercedes (2010), "Pallache Family (Moroccan Branch)", in Stillman, Norman A. (ed.), Encyclopedia of Jews in the Islamic World, vol. 4, Brill
- Rahmani, Moïse (December 1990). "Les Patronymes: une histoire de nom ou histoire tout court" [A Story of a Name or a Short History] (PDF). Los Muestros (in French). Sefard (Institut Sephardi Europeen).
- Laredo, Abraham Isaac (1978). Les noms des juifs de Maroc: Essai d'onomastique judéo-marocaine. Madrid: Consejo Superior de Investigaciones Científicas - Instituto Arias Montano. pp. 966–971.
- "A 400 años de la muerte del sorprendente (¿espía?) Samuel Pallache, con Mercedes García-Arenal Rodríguez". Radio Sefarad.
- Anno: Joodse Marokkaan onder christenen (Dutch)
- Universiteit Leiden: Openingscollege 400 jaar Marokkaans - Nederlandse betrekkingen (Dutch)
- Review van Gerard Wiegers en Mercedes García-Arenal, Man of three worlds. Samuel Pallache, a Moroccan Jew in Catholic and Protestant Europe (Dutch)
- Wereldomroep: Diplomaat, handelaar, kaper en geleerde (Dutch)
