= Jewish pirates =

Seafaring Jewish people who engaged in piracy

Jasón, a Jewish archer on the prow of a pirate ship (a painting from Jason's Tomb)

Jewish pirates were Jews who engaged in piracy. While there is some mention of the phenomenon in antiquity, especially during the Hasmonean period (c. 140–37 BCE), most Jewish pirates were Sephardim who operated in the years following the Alhambra Decree of 1492 ordering the expulsion of Iberia's Jews. Upon fleeing Spain and Portugal, some of these Jews became pirates and turned to attacking the Catholic empires' shipping as both Barbary corsairs from their refuge in the Ottoman dominions, as well as privateers bearing letters of marque from Spanish rivals such as the United Netherlands.

Many Jews also gave economic support to privateers that attacked Spanish ships. The pirates stole valuables from Spanish treasure galleons and sold the treasure to Jewish merchants. Those Jewish merchants then sold the treasure and valuables onward for a profit, and used their money to support the pirates' raids against the Spanish. They considered it an effective revenge strategy for their expulsion and the Inquisition's continued religious persecution of their Jewish and converso brethren in both the Old and New Worlds.

== Piracy in the ancient world: pirates of Joppa ==
Ancient Jewish life was concentrated around in the highlands of the Samarian and Judaean Mountains, located some distance from the Mediterranean Sea. Therefore, Jews were initially not very active in seafaring or navigation. After 142 BCE, the Jewish Hasmonean state acquired ports of their own. Joppa (Jaffa), Ashdod and Gaza were added to their domain, and a small number of Jewish sailors developed.

Jewish pirates were first mentioned by Josephus. There is a drawing of a pirate ship following two merchant ships at Jason's Tomb in Jerusalem. The drawing shows three ships, one of which is a war ship with Jason holding the bow and getting ready to shoot. The painting is dated back at early 1st century BCE. The Seleucid Empire's decline in the region was a result of the Maccabean war, and was followed by an influx of Jewish and Syrian pirates operating from the Levant. Pompey's journey to Judea may indicate a connection between Jewish and Cilician pirates. As a matter of fact there were so many Jews at sea during Pompey's time, some of whom were pirates, that king Antigonus II Mattathias was accused of sending them out on purpose.

By the end of First Jewish–Roman War, also known as The Great Revolt, Jews who had been driven out of Galilee rebuilt Joppa (Jaffa), which had been destroyed earlier by Cestius Gallus. Surrounded and cut off by the Romans they rebuilt the city walls, and used a light flotilla to demoralize commerce and interrupt the grain supply to Rome from Alexandria.

In The Jewish War, Josephus wrote:

They also built themselves a great many piratical ships, and turned pirates upon the seas near to Syria, and Phoenicia, and Egypt, and made those seas unnavigable to all men.

In July 67 Vespasian attacked Joppa. The people of Joppa took to the sea, but a pre-dawn storm wrecked the ships. Many drowned, others killed themselves. Those who survived the wreck, numbering about 4,200, were killed by the Romans. Joppa was destroyed once again.

But some of them thought that to die by their own swords was lighter than by the sea, and so they killed themselves before they were drowned; although the greatest part of them were carried by the waves, and dashed to pieces against the abrupt parts of the rocks, insomuch that the sea was bloody a long way, and the maritime parts were full of dead bodies; for the Romans came upon those that were carried to the shore, and destroyed them; and the number of the bodies that were thus thrown out of the sea was four thousand and two hundred.

After Joppa's destruction for the second time, Vespasian built a citadel there to prevent the Jewish pirates from retaking the city. The Romans considered their victory over Joppa's pirates very important, and commemorated it with a large number of coins for "naval victory."

== Early modern Sephardi piracy ==
=== Iberian Jewish pirates ===
The Age of Exploration was, in part, enabled by crucial navigational advances developed by the primarily Jewish Majorcan cartographic school as well as Abraham Zacuto's ephemerides. Zacuto, Royal Astronomer and Historian of Portugal, left Portugal rather than become Christian. Vasco da Gama even lent his name to his Jewish pilot Gaspar da Gama. Many Jews also worked as ship navigators. Suddenly expelled from Iberia, their knowledge and skills in ship navigation made them enemies of the state and were contributing factors to the development of Jewish piracy in that age.

After Jews were expelled from Spain and Portugal, many of them settled in the friendlier Muslim lands of the Mediterranean (the Ottoman Empire for example). Like their Muslim compatriots who were likewise expelled in 1492, Jews were also looking to get revenge against Iberian Christians by sharing with Muslims the newest military techniques and secrets used by Christians. And they also joined in on Muslim anti-Christian piracy of the Mediterranean, such as Sinan Reis and Samuel Pallache.

The English State Papers of 1521 bear evidences of Sinan Reis, who sailed with Hayreddin Barbarossa:

As to Coron, it was reported at Rome a few days ago that Andrea Doria was informed that the famous Jewish pirate had prepared a strong fleet to meet the Spanish galleys which are to join Doria's nineteen

Christopher Columbus himself noticed a great symbolism in the expulsion of the Jews from Spain and his sea voyages of discovery, when he started his diary with this statement:

In the same month in which their Majesties issued the edict that all Jews should be driven out of the kingdom and the territories, in the same month they gave me the order to undertake, with sufficient men, my expedition of discovery to the Indies.

=== Jewish pirates of Jamaica ===
Today, there are only around 200 Jews in Jamaica. However, at some point 20% of Kingston's population were Portuguese and Spanish Jews, while Spanish Town was founded by escaped Jews. The first Jews colonized the island in 1530 just 40 years after it was invaded by Christopher Columbus. While for a time the Columbus family's rule kept out the Inquisition, when their power was eroded and the Church began threatening the crypto-Jewish populace, they aided the English conquest of Jamaica. Under the English, the city of Port Royal was home not only to privateers bearing letters of marque against Spanish treasure galleons, some of whom were Jewish, but was also home to a large Jewish community which economically supported the raids against the Spanish.

Jewish pirates of Jamaica named their ships for ancient Jewish heroes and prophets like Prophet Samuel, Queen Esther and Shield of Abraham. They targeted Spanish and Portuguese merchant ships. One of the most famous Jewish pirates of Jamaica was Moses Cohen Henriques, who in 1628, led with Piet Pieterszoon Hein the only successful capture of the Spanish treasure fleet. He went on to aid the Dutch capture of northeast Brazil from Portugal.

Abraham Blauvelt was a Dutch-Jewish pirate, privateer, and explorer of Central America and the western Caribbean, after whom the towns of Bluefields, Nicaragua, and Bluefields, Jamaica, were both named.

== Notable pirates ==
=== The Great Jew - Sinan Reis ===
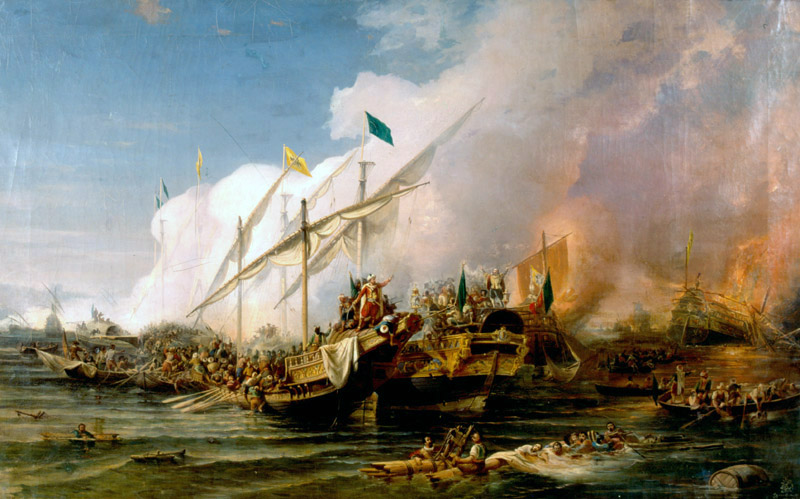
Barbarossa Hayreddin Pasha's force defeats the Holy League of Charles V under the command of Andrea Doria at the Battle of Preveza in 1538. Sinan Reis' leadership was key to the Ottoman victory.

Sinan, called The Great Jew by the Spaniards, was one such Jewish refugee whose family emigrated from Spain to the Ottoman Empire, according to some non-academic authors. He sailed as a barbary corsair under Hayreddin Barbarossa. Some attribute to him the defeat of an Imperial-Spanish fleet in 1538 at the Battle of Preveza. Some non-academic authors, mistaking him for Sinan Pasha and sometimes again mistaking the latter's place of burial, Üsküdar, for Shkodër in Albania (both places bearing the alternative name of Scutari), wrote erroneously that Sinan the Jew is buried in a Jewish cemetery in Albania.

=== Yaacov Kuriel ===
Yaacov Kuriel was born to a Jewish family which converted to Christianity under pressure from the Inquisition when Yaakov was a child. He was called Diego Da Coreia. As a young man, Yaacov Kuriel was a captain of the Spanish fleet until he was caught by the Inquisition, tortured and sentenced to death. He was freed by his sailors, most of whom were marranos themselves. For many years after that his only goal was revenge. He had three pirate ships under his command and was based in Jamaica. Later in life, he moved to Israel and became a disciple of the Arizal. He is buried near him in Safed. His gravestone bears a skull and crossbones. Little is known about what happened to him later. Some believe that eventually he made his way to the Holy Land, studied Kabbalah and died peacefully of old age.

=== Moses Cohen Henriques ===
Henriques was a Dutch Jewish Pirate of Portuguese Sephardic Jewish descent. Henriques operated in the Caribbean and in total his plunder and haul from his raids on the Spanish is estimated to be about 1 billion USD in current value.

== See also ==
- Samuel Pallache
- Pallache family
- Moses Cohen Henriques
