= Jacob Tirado =

Jacob Tirado (born ca. 1540; died in Jerusalem 1620) was one of the founders of the Spanish-Portuguese community of Amsterdam.

With several Marranos he sailed from Portugal in a vessel which was driven out of its course to Emden in East Friesland. Following the advice of Rabbi Moses Uri ha-Levi, he continued his travels with his companions to Amsterdam, c. 1593. After his arrival there, he confessed the Jewish faith openly, and afterwards, though advanced in years, underwent the rite of circumcision.

Together with Jacob Israel Belmonte and Samuel Pallache, Tirado founded the Spanish-Portuguese community of Amsterdam, being its first president.

Having acquired a house on the Houtgracht, he transformed it into Amsterdam's first synagogue, which was called after him Bet Ya'akob (Hebrew) or Casa de Jacob (Ladino), i.e., Beth Jacob, consecrated at the Jewish New Year's festival (September 1597).

Annually on Yom Kippur a special prayer in his behalf is recited as an acknowledgment of his important services to the community. In his old age Tirado traveled to Jerusalem, where he died.

== See also ==
- Sephardic Jews
- Spanish-Portuguese community of Amsterdam
- History of the Jews in the Netherlands
- Samuel Pallache
- Pallache family
