= David Franco Mendes =

Dutch-Jewish Hebrew-language poet

- Born: 13 August 1713; Amsterdam
- Died: 10 October 1792 (aged 79); Amsterdam
- Writing career
- Language: Hebrew
- Literary movement: Haskalah

David Franco Mendes (Hebrew: דוד פרונקו מינדיס; 13 August 1713 – 10 October 1792), also known as David Ḥofshi (Hebrew: דוד חפשי), was a Dutch-Jewish Hebrew-language poet. He was an early member of the Haskalah in Holland.

== Biography ==
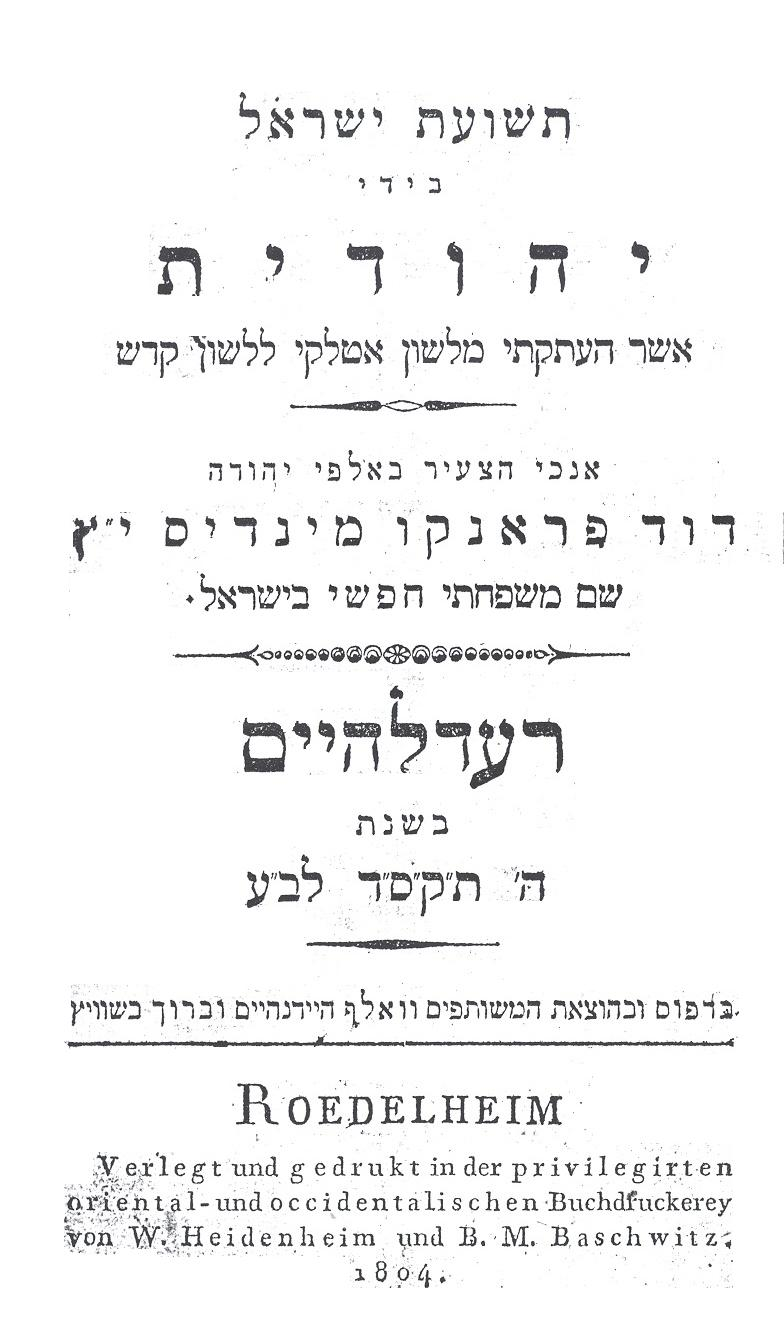
Title page of Teshu'at Yisrael bi-Yede Yehudit.

A businessman, he devoted his leisure hours to the study of the Talmud, in which he became very proficient. He knew several languages and was especially well versed in Hebrew. For six months preceding his death he was honorary secretary of the Spanish-Portuguese community in Amsterdam.

David Franco Mendes was regarded as, next to Moses Hayyim Luzzatto and Naphtali Hirz Wessely, the most important Hebrew poet of his time. Delitzsch describes his poems as traditional in subject, national in spirit, and artistic in form. He followed Racine's Athalie in his historical drama Gemul 'Atalyah (Amsterdam, 1770; Vienna, 1800; Warsaw, 1860). Under the title Teshu'at Yisrael bi-Yede Yehudit (Rödelheim, 1840) he translated into Hebrew Pietro Metastasio's Betulia liberata. He was a frequent contributor to Ha-Meassef, in which he published some poems and short biographies of eminent Spanish-Portuguese Jewish.

He left several manuscripts, written partly in Hebrew, partly in Portuguese and Spanish, most of which (as of 1903) were in possession of the seminary of the Spanish-Portuguese community at Amsterdam. They include: Bi'at ha-Mashiaḥ, on the advent of the Messiah; Nir le-Dawid, responsa, several of which are printed in the collection Peri 'Eẓ Ḥayyim; a collection of Hebrew epitaphs; and Kinnor Dawid, a large collection of poems by him and others. His Memorias do Estabelecimento e Progresso dos Judeos Portuguezes e Espanhoes nesta Famosa Cidade de Amsterdam: Recapilados de Paneis Antigos Impressos e Escritos, no Ao. 5529 = 1769 (MS. no. 220, p. 4), Memorias Succintas da Consternaçaõ de Nosso K. K. de Amsterdam nos Tribulaçoõs desde Cidade e Provincia, no Ao. 1787 (MS. no. 34, p. 4), and Collecaõ de Antiguidades (manuscript) are of historical value.
