= Judah Uziel =

Judah Uziel (d. 1634, Venice, probably; Jewish Encyclopedia of 1971 says he died ca. 1600) was an Italian scholar of the 16th century, born in Spain. He was the author of sixteen sermons on the Pentateuch, which were published under the title Bet ha-'Uzzieli (Venice, 1603-4).
