= Isaac Uziel =

Moroccan physician, poet and grammarian

Isaac ben Abraham Uziel (died 1 April 1622, Amsterdam) (Hebrew: יצחק בן אברהם עזיאל) was a Moroccan physician, poet and grammarian, born at Fez, Morocco. At one time he held the position of rabbi at Oran, Algeria, but late in life he left that city to settle in Amsterdam, where he opened a Talmudical school which counted among its pupils Manasseh ben Israel and Isaac Aboab da Fonseca. Dissatisfied with the laxity in religious matters which he noticed among many members of the Sephardic community, Uziel delivered a series of lectures which led to the foundation of a new congregation under the name of "Neveh Shalom". In 1610, at the death of Judah Vega, the first rabbi of the new congregation, Uziel was called to the rabbinate.

Uziel was the author of a Hebrew grammar, Ma'aneh Lashon, edited by his pupil Isaac Nehemiah at Amsterdam in 1627 (2nd ed. 1710). He left also in manuscript many Hebrew and Spanish poems (Libros Poeticos en Declaracion de Todos los Equivocos de las Sagradas Letras); these are highly praised by De Barrios, who represents the author as a great poet, an able musician, and a distinguished mathematician. Joseph Serrano dedicated a poem to Uziel; it is inserted in the Temime Derek.

== Jewish Encyclopedia bibliography ==
- Koenen, Geschiedenis der Joden in Nederland, pp. 144, 428;
- Adolf Jellinek, in Orient, Lit. viii. 264, 276;
- Meyer Kayserling, Geschichte der Juden in Portugal, p. 285;
- idem, Bibl. Esp.-Port.-Jud. p. 107;
- Moritz Steinschneider, Cat. Bodl. s.v.;
- Fuenn, Keneset Yisrael, p. 646.
