= Sephardic Jews in the Netherlands =

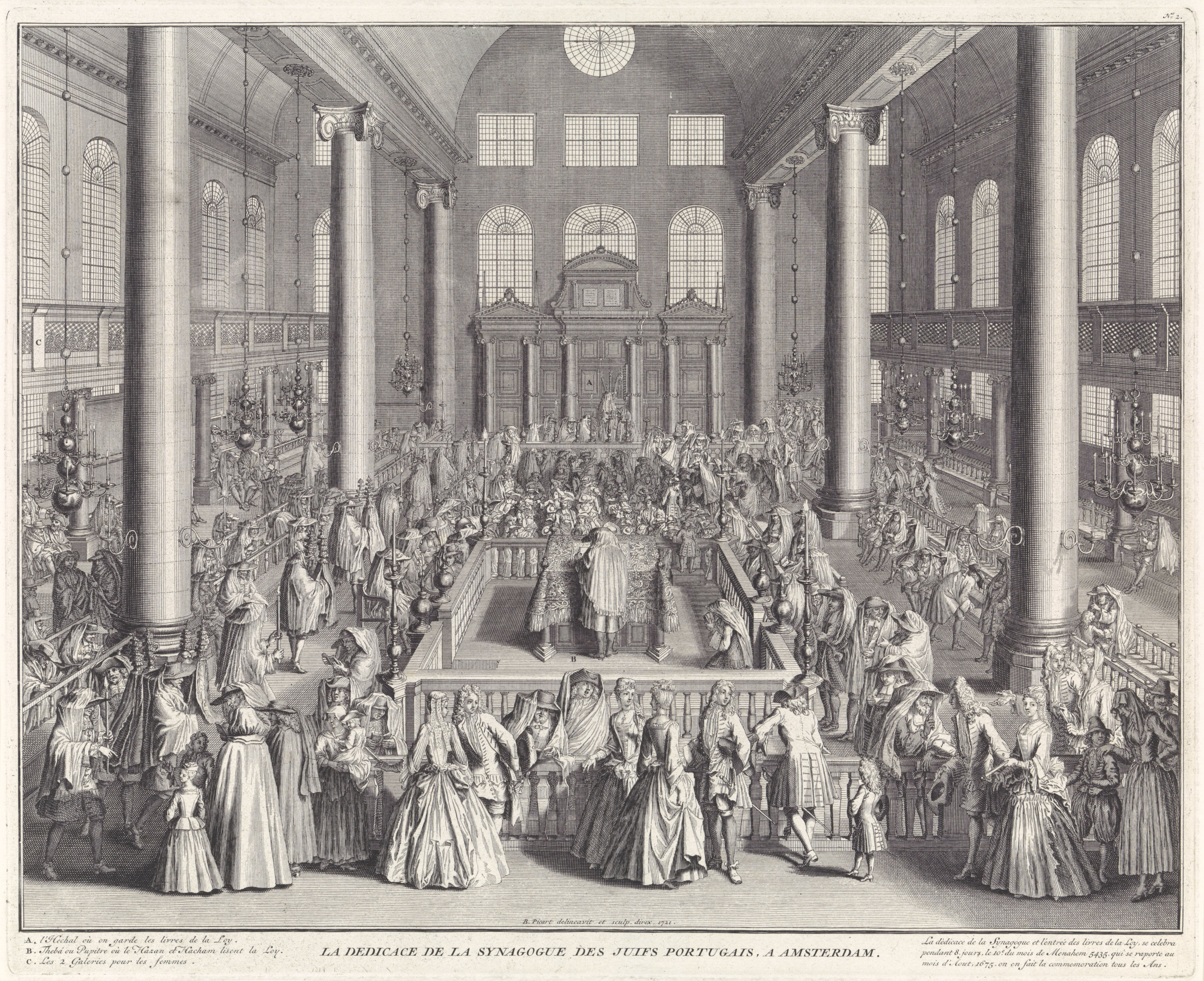
Inauguration of the Portuguese Synagogue in Amsterdam, 1675 (Illustration by Bernard Picart, 1721)

The community of Sephardic Jews in the Netherlands, particularly in Amsterdam, was of major importance in the seventeenth century. The Portuguese Jews in the Netherlands did not refer to themselves as "Sephardim", but rather as "Hebrews of the Portuguese Nation." The Portuguese-speaking community grew from conversos, Jews forced to convert to Catholicism in Spain and Portugal, who rejudaized under rabbinical authority, to create an openly self-identified Portuguese Jewish community. As a result of the expulsions from Spain in 1492 and Portugal in 1496, as well as the religious persecution by the Inquisition that followed, many Spanish and Portuguese Jews left the Iberian Peninsula at the end of the 15th century and throughout the 16th century, in search of religious freedom. Some migrated to the newly independent Dutch provinces which allowed Jews to become residents. Many Jews who left for the Dutch provinces were crypto-Jews. Others had been sincere New Christians, who, despite their conversion, were targeted by Old Christians as suspect. Some of these sought to return to the religion of their ancestors. Ashkenazi Jews began migrating to the Netherlands in the mid-seventeenth century, but Portuguese Jews viewed them with ambivalence.

== State of the community before the large-scale migration ==
Many Jews migrating from the Kingdom of Portugal, where Spanish Jews had fled after the Spanish Inquisition had been introduced in Spain in 1478, followed by the expulsion of the Jews from Spain in 1492. In 1497, the Portuguese forcibly converted all Jews in Portugal, including many who had returned to Judaism after fleeing Spain and its Inquisition. Following the establishment in 1536 of the Portuguese Inquisition, descendants of Jews who had converted to Catholicism dating back to a forced conversion in Spain in 1391 through the Portuguese forced conversion, were looked upon with suspicion by Old Christians. In search of greater religious and economic freedoms, many crypto-Jews left Portugal for places with more lenient religious legislation and opportunities where their unique skill sets could thrive. Many left for Brazil, where Europeans were Portuguese-speaking, and France. A couple of decades later, groups of crypto-Jews started reaching the Dutch Republic.

== Migration to Amsterdam ==
Amsterdam became one of the most favored destinations in the Netherlands for Sephardic Jews. Because many were merchants and traders, Amsterdam benefited economically from their arrival. However, the reason to settle in Amsterdam was not merely voluntary; many crypto-Jews or marranos had been refused admission in trading centers such as Middelburg and Haarlem and because of that settled in Amsterdam. Soon many Jews settled at Vlooienburg. There were three struggling congregations. In 1638 a reconciliation was achieved, whereby one synagogue was sold, one remained in existence and the third continued to be used as a schoolroom which merged to Talmud Torah, a united Sephardic congregation. Several Sephardic Jews supported the House of Orange and were in return protected by the stadholder.

== Relationship with Amsterdam officials ==
Many types of discriminatory laws commonplace in Europe and previously in medieval times were no longer in place in Amsterdam starting ca. 1600; to the extent such laws were on the books, they weren't always followed strictly. In part, such general religious toleration arose before Jews came to Amsterdam, as city officials adopted a policy of freedom of conscience in joining the Union of Utrecht. Despite voiced challenges toward the loose legislation tolerating Jews, Burgomasters continued to enact laws tailored to their own pragmatic vision of society, even if they were contrary to popular opinion disfavoring Jews. Much of the toleration expressed by the Amsterdam officials was rooted in the economic assets the new Portuguese Jewish community could provide, as well as the officials’ lack of prior experience with Jewish residents. These factors made Amsterdam officials and even residents less susceptible to labeling the entire Jewish community by their negatively perceived history in Christian tradition. While the Jews of Amsterdam enjoyed greater freedoms in the religious and economic spheres of everyday life, which helped them assimilate more quickly and efficiently into Amsterdam society, they were denied certain political privileges, like participation in municipal government.

== Religious identity and community in Amsterdam ==
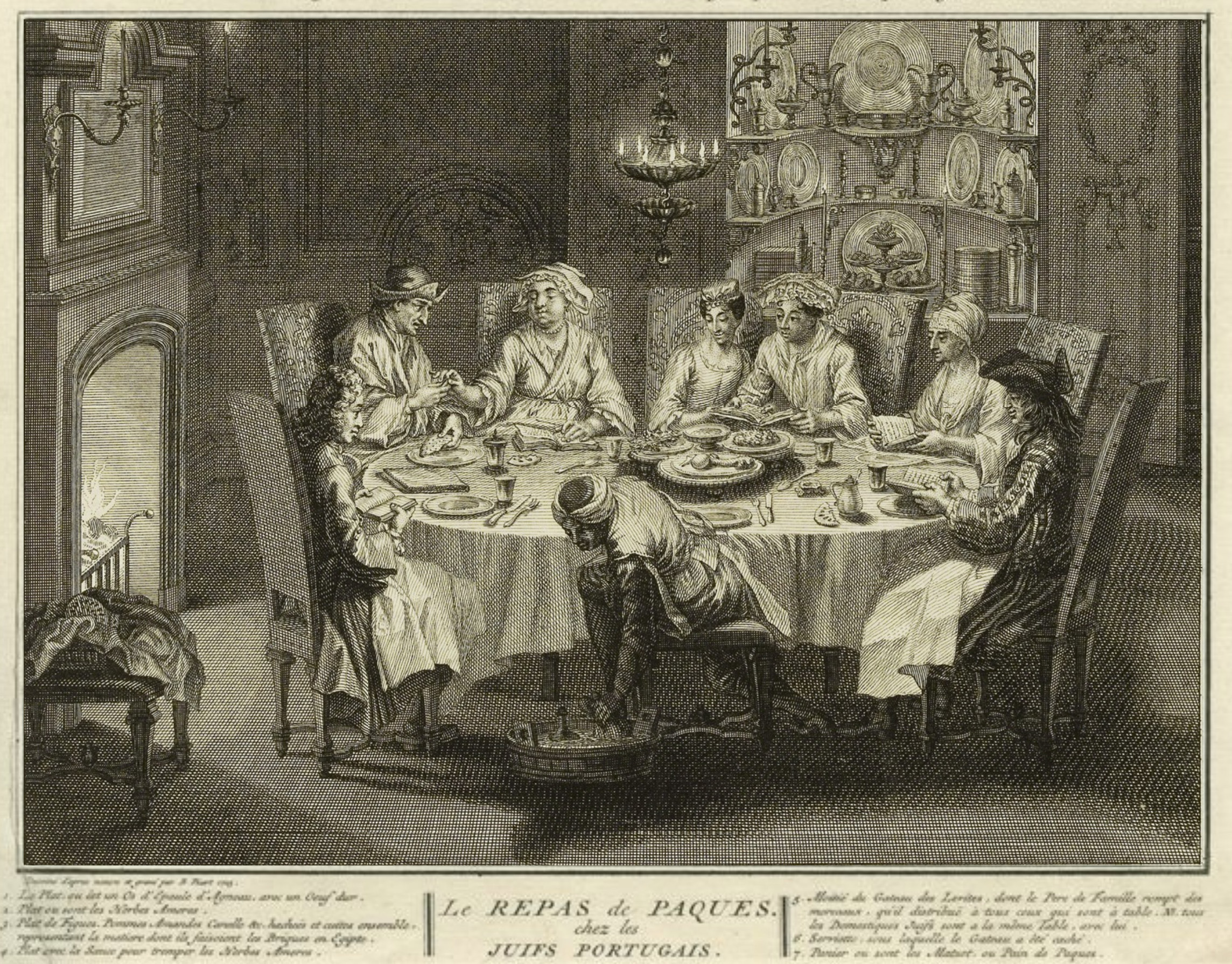
The Passover Seder of the Portuguese Jews, Amsterdam (illustration circa 1733–1739 by Bernard Picart)

The Jewish community of Amsterdam was self-governing, with the Imposta board overseeing communal and individual conduct until the establishment of the unified Ma'amad or governing committee in 1639, seven prominent men who had final say over all that happened in the Jewish community. The Ma'amad was self-sustaining, with members appointing their successors, thus keeping the communal power in the hands of the merchant elite among the Portuguese Jews. Besides providing for and overseeing the institutions of Portuguese Jewry in Amsterdam, the Ma'amad also closely controlled the process of rejudaization, helping those who were outwardly Catholic return to a Jewish life. In this process, several individuals rejected Rabbinic Judaism or advanced ideas outside of the norms of Judaism at that time and were disciplined by the Ma'amad through the process of ḥerem, which could be anything from denial of Torah honors to an outright ban on the individual. The most famous of those to receive a full ḥerem was philosopher Baruch Spinoza, whose intellectual contributions were very important in his time and continue to influence thinkers to this day.

Less influential were Solomon Ayllon and Tzvi Ashkenazi, who had Romaniote origins. Ayllon was connected to kabbalah, a mystical aspect of Judaism, and Tzvi Ashkenazi to the Sabbateans, a significant Jewish messianic movement. In Salonica, Ashkenazi witnessed the impact of Sabbatai Zevi, the Jewish messiah claimant, on the community. This experience became a determining factor in his whole career.

On 30 June 1713, Nehemiah Hayyun arrived at Amsterdam and requested the permission of the Portuguese Congregation or Esnoga to circulate his writings, which had been published in Berlin. Tzvi Ashkenazi thought Hayyun was an old enemy of his from Sarajevo and Salonica, and immediately requested Ayllon, who was the hakham of the Esnoga and was also from Salonica, not to accord patronage to Hayyun, who was unfavorably known to him. On 23 July Tzvi Ashkenazi pronounced the ban of exclusion upon Ḥayyun and his heretical book. Ayllon was no doubt the rabbi who laid charges against Tzvi Ashkenazi before the Amsterdam magistrates, and thus made an internal dissension of the Jewish community a matter of public discussion.

== Commerce ==
=== International commerce ===
The migration of Jews from Portugal and Spain to many places other than Amsterdam allowed them to build a strong international trading network that was unique to diaspora members. Because of the business and family relations many Amsterdam Jews had in light of their former community’s dispersal, they established trading connections with the Levant and Morocco. For instance, the Jewish-Moroccan merchant Samuel Pallache (ca. 1550-1616) was sent to the Dutch Republic by Sultan Zidan Abu Maali of Morocco in 1608 to be his ambassador at The Hague. In particular, the relations between the Dutch and South America were established by Sephardic Jews; they contributed to the establishment of the Dutch West Indies Company in 1621, and some of them were members of its directorate. The ambitious schemes of the Dutch for the conquest of Brazil were carried into effect through Francisco Ribeiro, a Portuguese captain, who is said to have had Jewish relations in Holland. After the Dutch in Brazil appealed to Holland for craftsmen of all kinds, many Jews went to Brazil; about 600 Jews left Amsterdam in 1642, accompanied by two distinguished scholars — Isaac Aboab da Fonseca and Moses Raphael de Aguilar. In the struggle between Holland and Portugal for the possession of Brazil, the Dutch were supported by the Jews. The Jews of Amsterdam also established commercial relations with various countries in Europe. In a letter dated November 25, 1622, King Christian IV of Denmark invited Jews from Amsterdam to settle in Glückstadt, where, among other privileges, the free exercise of their religion would be assured to them.

=== Commerce and occupations in Amsterdam ===
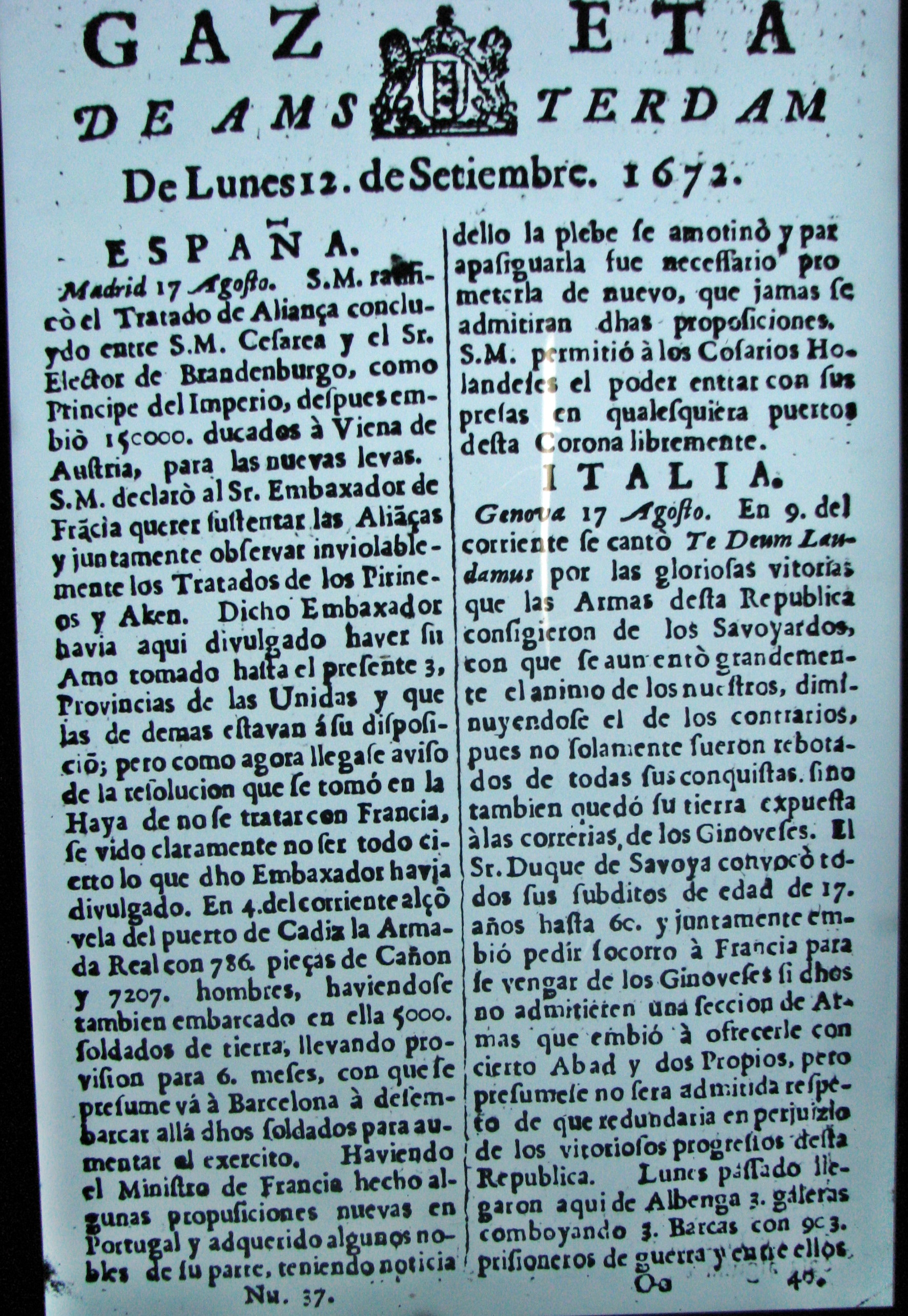
Front page of the Castilian Spanish Jewish economic newspaper Gazeta de Amsterdam published in 1672

Besides merchants, a great number of physicians were among the Spanish and Portuguese Jews in Amsterdam, including Samuel Abravanel, David Nieto, Elijah Montalto, and the Bueno family. Joseph Bueno was consulted in the illness of Maurice of Nassau, Prince of Orange (April 1623). Jews were admitted as students at the university, where they studied medicine as the only branch of science which was of practical use to them, for they were not permitted to practise law, and the oath they would be compelled to take excluded them from the professorships. Neither were Jews taken into the trade guilds: a resolution passed by the city of Amsterdam in 1632 excluded them. Exceptions, however, were made in the case of trades which stood in peculiar relations to their religion: printing, bookselling, the selling of meat, poultry, groceries, and drugs. Jews tended to involve themselves in newer industries in Amsterdam, like the importation of colonial products, that just so happened to not have as many guild restrictions attached to them. In 1655, a Jew was permitted to establish a sugar refinery. Jews also became heavily involved in the jewelry and tobacco industries. While occupational status did not differ greatly between Jews and the rest of the Amsterdam population, Jews were far more concentrated in particular lines of commerce.

== Decline ==
The migration of Portuguese Jews from the Netherlands to the Caribbean Antilles began in the mid-17th century, after the Dutch fleet captured the island of Curaçao from Spain in 1634. One generation later, several waves of migrant Jewish and Protestant families from the Netherlands had established a shipping and trading settlement in Willemstad, a natural harbor controlled by the Dutch West Indies Company. The Dutch troops lost the Brazilian colony of Recife to the Portuguese in 1654, which forced many Dutch Sephardic refugees from Brazil to move to Curaçao or to the colony of New Amsterdam (Manhattan).

By the 1680s, the Portuguese Jewish community of Amsterdam went into decline, in spite of having built a new synagogue, the monumental Esnoga, which was inaugurated in 1675. With the Netherlands experiencing economic difficulty (in part due to loss of New World colonies) some Jews left and immigration slowed. The Ashkenazic community became the larger Jewish community in Amsterdam, even as the Sephardic Jews kept positions of power and remained the significantly wealthier community. The process of emancipation, granting Jews full Dutch citizenship in the late 18th and early 19th century, continued the erosion of power the Mahamad held over the community.

== Holocaust ==
On the eve of the Holocaust, approximately 4300 Sephardic Jews were living in the Netherlands out of a total Jewish population of some 140,000 (3%). After World War II, the Sephardic community had declined to some 800 people, 20% of the prewar population. The Holocaust ended the existence of the Sephardic community in The Hague, with its Jews deported to Nazi concentration camps and with no post-war resettlement in any numbers.

== Current era ==
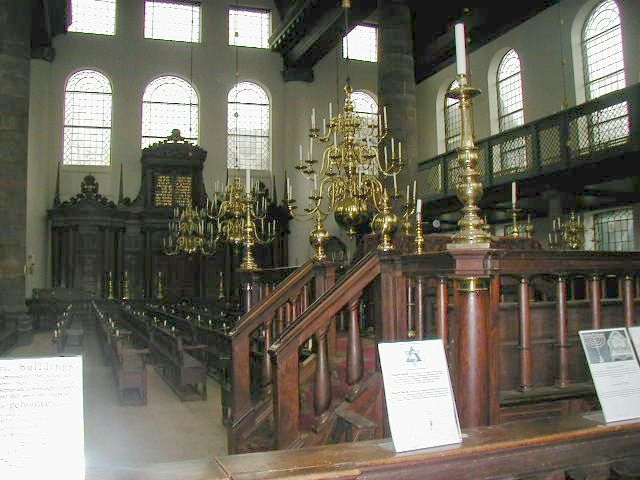
Interior of the 1675 Esnoga (Sephardic synagogue) in Amsterdam

The Sephardic community in the Netherlands, called the Portugees-Israëlitisch Kerkgenootschap "Portuguese-Israelite Religious Community" (PIK), has a membership of some 270 families (approximately 600 persons), and is concentrated in Amsterdam. They constitute now some 2% of the Dutch Jewish community. The PIK also has a youth movement, J-PIG (Jongeren Portugees-Israëlitische Gemeente - Youth Portuguese-Israelite Community).

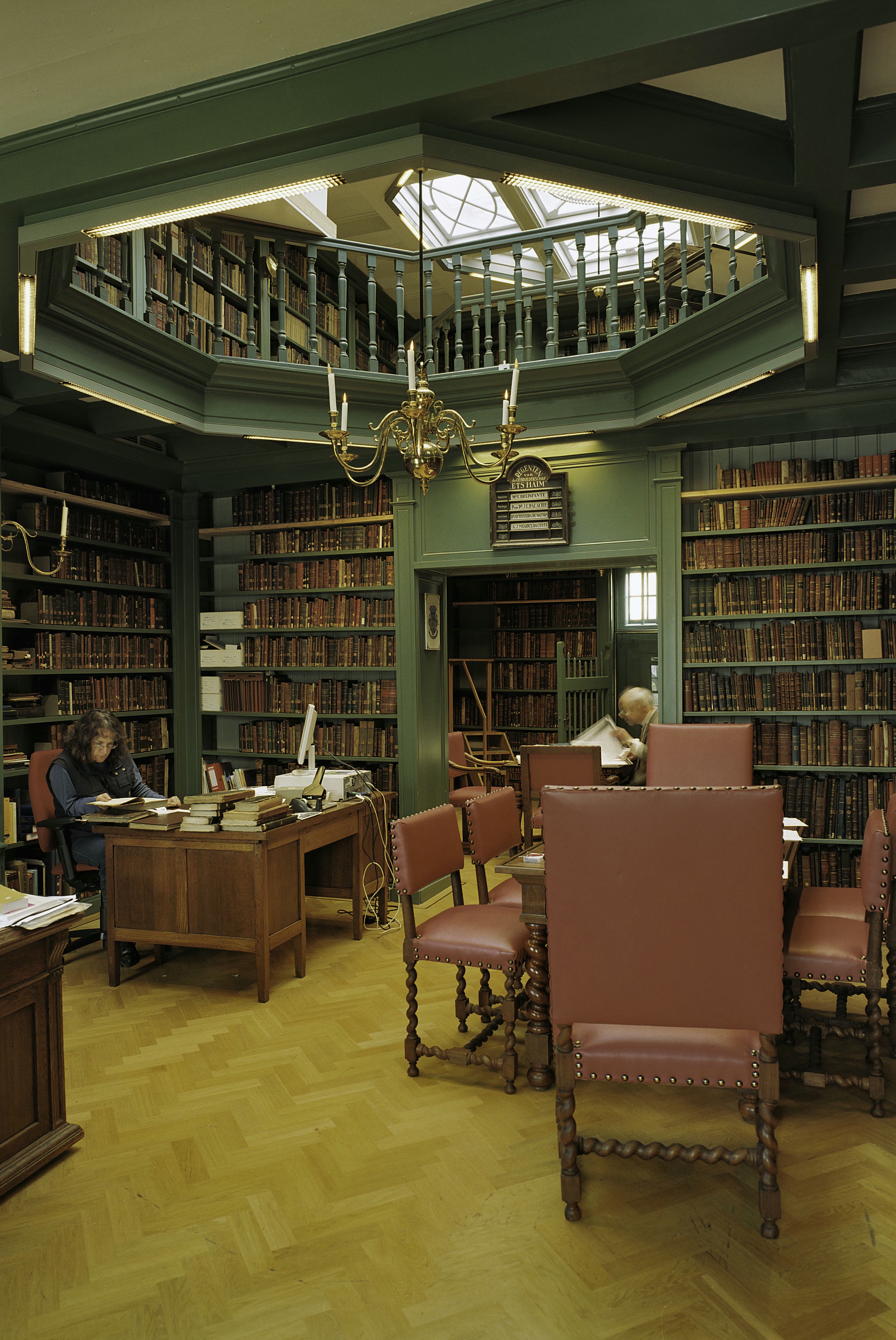
Library Ets Haim - Livraria Montezinos -

Amsterdam is still home to works of its once vibrant Sephardic community. The Esnoga, which was inaugurated in 1675, is located at the heart of Amsterdam's Jewish Cultural Quarter and it is still in use today. The venerable Library Ets Haim - Livraria Montezinos was founded in 1616 and it is the oldest functioning Jewish library in the world. Also, the Sephardic cemetery Beth Haim of Ouderkerk aan de Amstel, in a village on the outskirts of Amsterdam, has been in use since 1614 and is the oldest Jewish cemetery in the Netherlands. Another reminder of the Sephardic community in Amsterdam is the Huis de Pinto, a residence for the wealthy Sephardic family de Pinto, constructed in 1680.

== Notable Portuguese Jews ==
- Abraham Blauvelt, a 17th century Jewish privateer and explorer of Central America and the western Caribbean, after whom the towns of Bluefields, Nicaragua, and Bluefields, Jamaica, were both named
- David de Aaron de Sola – rabbi and author (1796–1860)
- Abraham Cohen Pimentel – rabbi Amsterdam Synagogue (died 1697)
- Jacob Abendana – rabbi and philosopher (1630–1695)
- Jacob Israel Belmonte – poet, co-founder of the Sephardic community of Amsterdam (1570–1629)
- Manuel de Belmonte – diplomat (died 1705)
- Isaac Aboab da Fonseca – rabbi, kabbalist, scholar, writer (February 1, 1605 – April 4, 1693)
- Hedy d'Ancona – female politician, well-known feminist (b. October 1, 1937)
- Abraham Bueno de Mesquita – comedian, actor (July 23, 1918 – August 19, 2005)
- Benjamin Cardozo – Associate Justice of the Supreme Court of the United States (May 24, 1870 – July 9, 1938)
- Uri Coronel – sports director and chairman of Ajax Amsterdam (December 24, 1946 – July 18, 2016)
- Daniel De Leon – American Socialist leader (December 14, 1852 – May 11, 1914)
- Isaac da Costa – poet (January 14, 1798 – April 28, 1860)
- Manasseh ben Israel – rabbi, influential in the readmission of the Jews to England (1604–1657)
- Samuel Jessurun de Mesquita – graphic artist, mentor of M. C. Escher (June 6, 1868 – February 11, 1944, Auschwitz)

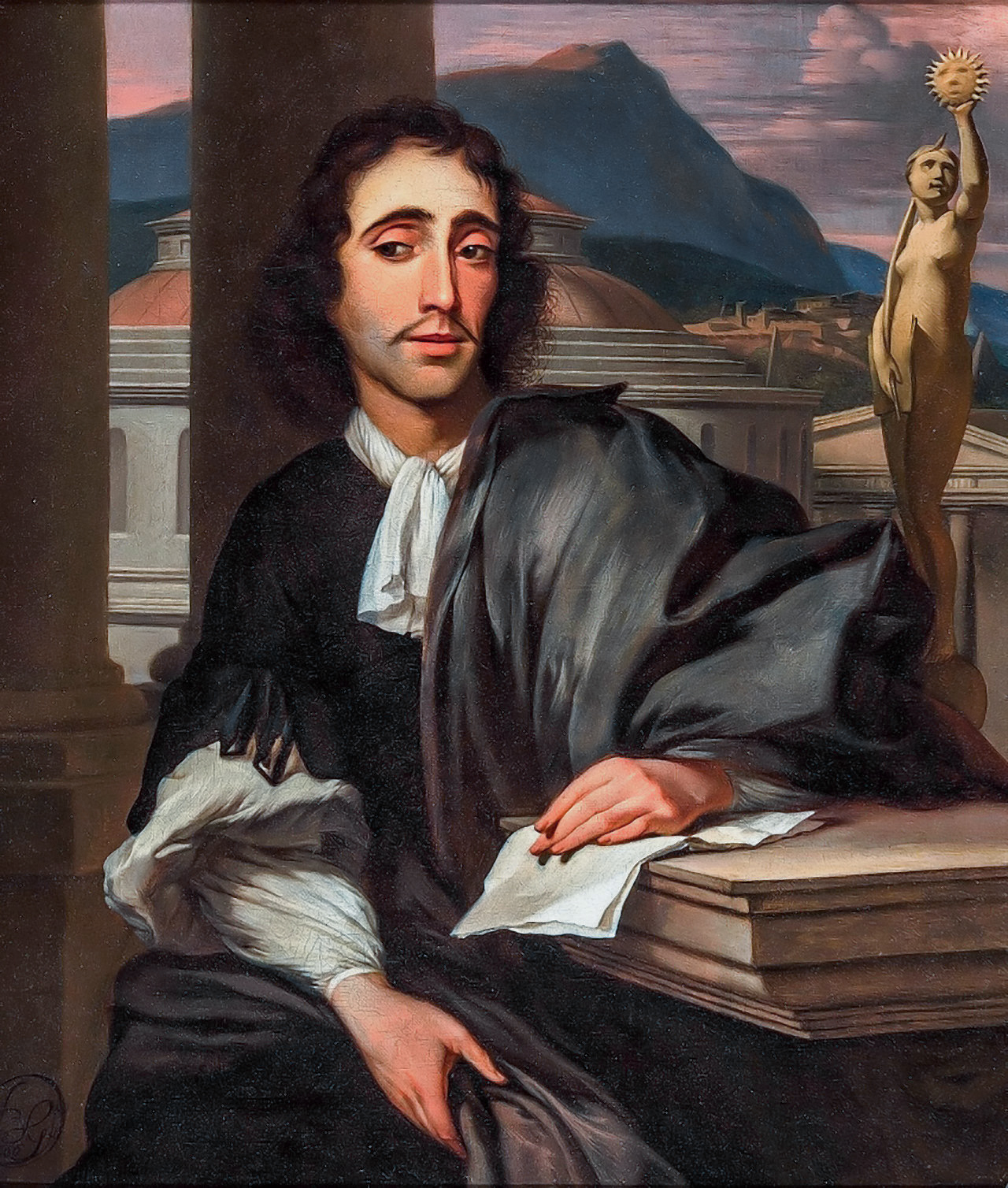
Baruch Spinoza, born and raised in Amsterdam's Portuguese Jewish community, became one of the most influential figures of Western philosophy after his permanent expulsion by religious leaders

- Abraham Lopes Cardozo – hazzan of Congregation Shearith Israel (1914–2006)
- George Maduro – resistance fighter, distinguished officer (July 15, 1916 – February 9, 1945, Dachau concentration camp)
- Balthazar (Isaac) Orobio de Castro – philosopher (1617–1687)
- Samuel Pallache – Moroccan envoy to the Dutch Republic, co-founder of the Sephardic community of Amsterdam (ca. 1550–1616)
- Samuel Sarphati – physician, city planner (1813–1866)
- Baruch Spinoza – philosopher and optician (November 24, 1632 – February 21, 1677), excommunicated 1656
- Jacob Tirado – merchant and shipowner, co-founder of the Sephardic community of Amsterdam (ca. 1540–1620)
- Joseph de la Vega – author, poet and economist (1650–1692)
- Isaac de Pinto – merchant/banker, political philosopher (1717–1787)
- Joseph Teixeira de Mattos – watercolor painter and pastellist (1892–1971)
- Joseph Mendes da Costa – sculptor and teacher (1863–1939)
- Rehuel Lobatto – mathematician (1797–1866)
- Nathan Lopes Cardozo - contemporary rabbi, philosopher and scholar of Judaism

== Persons of partial Dutch Jewish descent ==
- Frieda Belinfante – cellist and conductor, Jewish father (May 10, 1904 – April 26, 1995)
- Neve Campbell – Canadian actress, daughter of an Amsterdam-born mother of Portuguese Jewish descent (October 3, 1973)
- Abraham Pais – particle physicist, science historian, Portuguese Jewish father, Ashkenazi mother (May 19, 1918 – July 28, 2000)
- Ophir Pines-Paz – Israeli politician, Dutch-Sephardic father (July 11, 1961)

== See also ==
- History of the Jews in Amsterdam
- History of the Jews in the Netherlands

== Sources ==
- Bodian, Miriam, Hebrews of the Portuguese Nation: Conversos and Community in Early Modern Amsterdam: Indiana University Press 1997.!
- da Silva Rosa, J. S., Geschiedenis der Portugeesche Joden te Amsterdam 1593-1925 (History of the Portuguese Jews in Amsterdam 1593-1925): Amsterdam 1925 (Dutch)
- Katchen, Aaron L., Christian Hebraists and Dutch Rabbis: Seventeenth Century Apologetics and the Study of Maimonides' Mishneh Torah: Harvard University Press 1985
- Sorkin, David, Beyond the east-west divide: rethinking the narrative of the Jews’ political status in Europe, 1600–1750: Jewish History 2000
- Swetschinski, Daniel M., Reluctant Cosmopolitans: The Portuguese Jews Of Seventeenth-century Amsterdam: Littman Library of Jewish Civilisation 2004
- Tammes, Peter., “Hack, Pack, Sack”: Occupational Structure, Status, and Mobility of Jews in Amsterdam, 1851–1941: Journal of Interdisciplinary History 2012
