= Pardo (surname) =

- Language: Spanish, Hebrew, Latin

Origin
- Derivation: Pardus
- Meaning: Brownish grey

Pardo (Hebrew: פרדו) is a surname of Sephardic Jewish origin and judaite tribe.

== Notable people with the surname ==
- David ben Jacob Pardo: Rabbinic commentator and liturgical poet.
- Isaac ben David Pardo : The rabbi of Sarajevo, Bosnia, brother of Jacob Pardo.
- Jacob Vita Pardo: Son of David Samuel Pardo, born in Ragusa 1822 and died in 1843 in Padua, where he was a student of the Rabbinicum Collegium.
- David ben José Pardo : Rabbi, born in Amsterdam,
- José ben David Pardo Editor of Shulḥan Ṭahor
- José Pardo (rabbi)
- Jacob Ben David Pardo : Rabbi in Ragusa and Split in the 18th century.
- Claudia Sheinbaum Pardo (born 1962) is a Mexican academic and political activist.
- Moisés ben Raphael Pardo : rabbi and rabbinical emissary.
- Dr. Sharon Pardo: member of the Department of Politics and Government and Director of the Center for the Study of European Politics and Society (CSEPS).
- Juan Pardo (explorer): a Spanish explorer and conqueror
- Al Pardo (born 1962), Spanish-born former professional baseball player
- Alejandro Pardo (born 1993), Italian motorcycle racer born in Spain
- Anselmo Pardo Alcaide (1913–1977), Spanish entomologist
- Arsenio Iglesias Pardo (born 1930), Galician (Spanish) football player and coach
- Arvid Pardo (1914–1999), Maltese diplomat and scholar born in Italy
- Bernard Pardo (born 1960), French football player
- Bernardo P. Pardo (born 1932), Filipino judge
- Bob Pardo, American military pilot known for the Pardo's Push
- Bruce Jeffrey Pardo, perpetrator of the Covina massacre
- Carlos Pardo (1975–2009), Mexican NASCAR driver
- Carlos Pardo-Villamizar, Colombian neuroscientist
- Claudia Sheinbaum Pardo (born 1962), Mexican scientist, 66th President of Mexico
- David Pardo (Dutch rabbi, born at Salonica), (c.1591–1657)
- David Pardo (Dutch rabbi, born in Amsterdam), 17th century rabbi and grandson of the David Pardo born at Salonica
- David Pardo (Italian rabbi), (1719–1792), rabbinical commentator and liturgical poet
- Don Pardo (1918–2014), American radio and television announcer
- Emilia Pardo Bazán (1851–1921), Galician (Spanish) writer and scholar
- Enrique Cal Pardo (born 1922), Galician (Spanish) writer
- Felipe Pardo (born 1990), Colombian football player
- Felipe Pardo y Aliaga (1806–1868), Peruvian writer, diplomat and politician
- Frank Fernández Pardo (born 1992), Chilean football player
- Herbert Pardo (Hamburg 1887- Haifa 1974), German-born lawyer and politician
- Isaac Pardo, rabbi of Sarajevo
- Isaac Díaz Pardo (1920–2012), Galician (Spanish) artist and businessman
- Isaac J Pardo (1905–2000), Venezuelan historian and physician
- Jacinto Angulo Pardo, Cuban Minister of Internal Trade
- Jacob Pardo, 18th-century rabbi of Ragusa and Spalato
- Jacob Vita Pardo (1822–1843), author and preacher
- Jaime Pardo Leal (1941–1987), Colombian presidential candidate
- J. D. Pardo (born 1980), American actor
- Jimmy Pardo (born 1966), American stand-up comedian, actor, and TV host
- Jorge Pardo (artist), Cuban born artist
- Jorge Pardo (musician) (born 1955), Spanish musician
- José Pardo y Barreda (1864–1947), President of Peru
- José Antonio Pardo Lucas (born 1988), Spanish football player
- Joseph Pardo (c. 1561 – 1619), Italian rabbi and merchant
- Joseph Pardo (c. 1624 – 1677), English hazzan
- Josiah Pardo (1626–1684), Dutch rabbi
- Juan Pardo (explorer), 16th-century Spanish explorer and conquistador
- Juan Pardo de Tavera (1472–1545), Spanish cardinal and Grand Inquisitor
- Laurent Pardo (1961–2016), French bass and cello player for US singer-songwriter Elliott Murphy
- Laurent Pardo (rugby player) (born 1958), French rugby union player
- Luciano Di Pardo (born 1975), Italian long-distance runner born in Germany
- Luis Pardo (1882–1935), Chilean sailor who rescued the Sir Ernest Shackleton's expedition
- Manuel Pardo (politician) (1834–1878), first civilian President of Peru
- Mariano Pardo de Figueroa (1828–1918), Spanish nobleman and philatelist
- Mario Pardo (footballer) (born 1988), Chilean football player
- Mario Pardo (wrestler) (born 1984), Mexican professional wrestler
- Mercedes Pardo (1921–2005), Venezuelan painter
- Moses Pardo (died 1888), rabbi and rabbinical emissary
- Orlando Luis Pardo Lazo (born 1972), Cuban blogger
- Pável Pardo (born 1976), Mexican international football player
- Rafael Pardo Rueda (born 1953), Colombian politician
- Rob Pardo (born 1970), computer game designer (Warcraft)
- Rodrigo Pardo García-Peña (1958–2024), Colombian journalist, academic and diplomat
- Ron Pardo, Canadian actor
- Rubén Pardo (racing driver) (born 1979), Mexican NASCAR driver
- Rubén Pardo (footballer) (born 1992), Spanish football player
- Salvador Pardo Cruz, Cuban politician
- Sancho Pardo Donlebún (1537–1607), Spanish seafarer
- Sebastián Pardo (born 1982), Chilean football player
- Sergio Contreras Pardo (born 1983), Spanish football player
- Sharon Pardo (born 1971), Israeli academic
- Silvia Pardo (born 1941), Mexican painter
- Tamir Pardo (born 1953), former Director of the Israeli Mossad
- Thomas Pardo (died 1763), Principal of Jesus College, Oxford
- Thomas Letson Pardo (1840–1925), Canadian politician
- Tomás Barros Pardo (1922–1986), Galician (Spanish) writer and painter
- Trinidad Pardo de Tavera (1857–1925), Filipino historian and physician
- Urko Rafael Pardo (born 1983), Spanish football player born in Belgium
