= David Pardo =

David Pardo may refer to:

- David Pardo (Dutch rabbi, born at Salonica) (c. 1591–1657)
- David Pardo (Dutch rabbi, born in Amsterdam), 17th century rabbi and grandson of the David Pardo born at Salonica
- David Pardo (Italian rabbi) (1719–1792), rabbinical commentator and liturgical poet

== See also ==
- Pardo (disambiguation)
