= Joseph Pardo =

Joseph Pardo may refer to:

- Joseph Pardo (hazzan) (c. 1624–1677), English hazzan
- Joseph Pardo (rabbi) (c. 1561–1619), Italian rabbi and merchant

== See also ==
- José Pardo (disambiguation)
