= The Jewish Cemetery =

Painting by Jacob van Ruisdael in the Detroit Institute of Arts

- Het Joodse kerkhof (Dutch), De Joodse begraafplaats (Dutch)
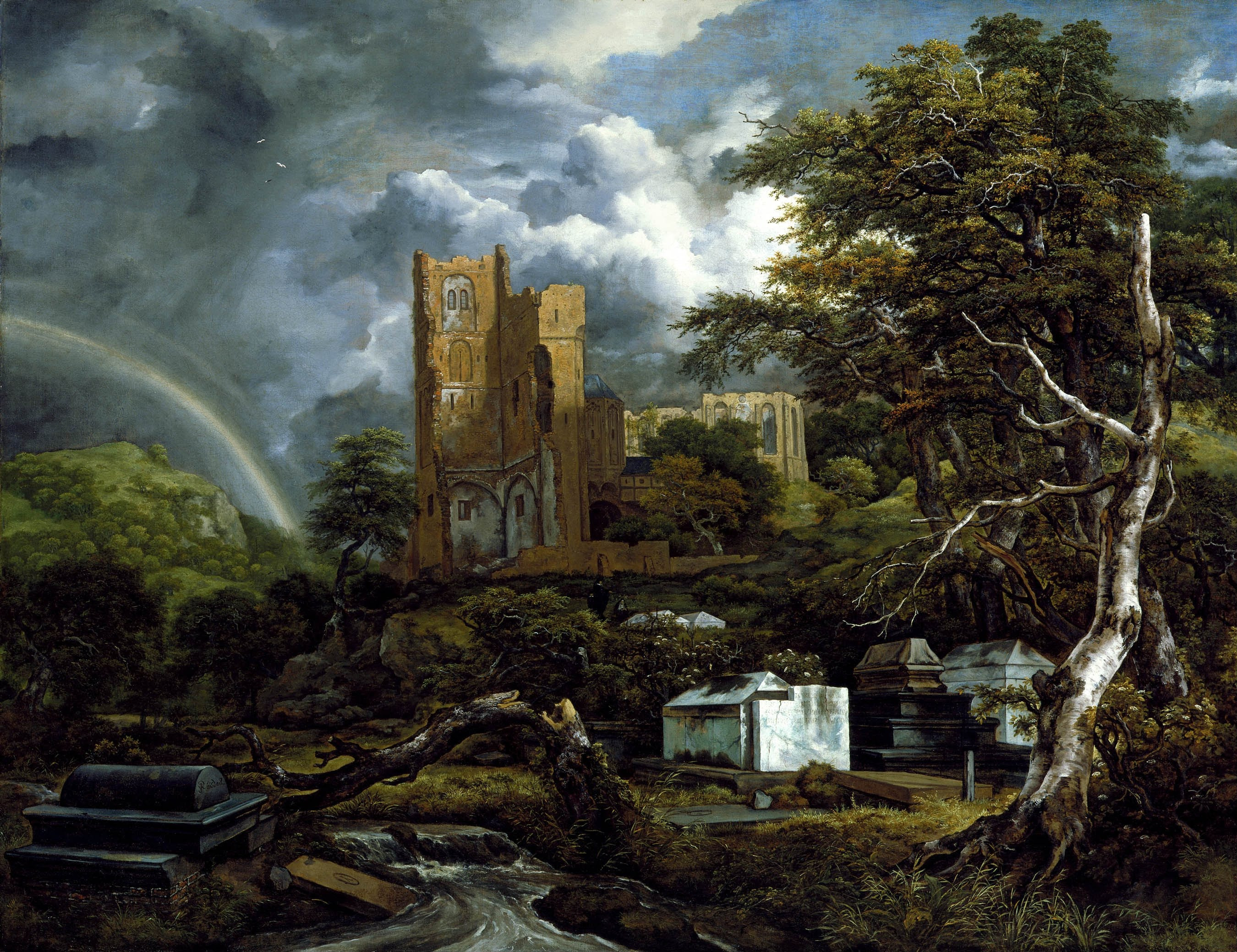
- Artist: Jacob van Ruisdael
- Year: 1654 or 1655
- Medium: Oil on canvas
- Dimensions: 142.2 cm × 189.2 cm (56.0 in × 74.5 in)
- Location: Detroit Institute of Arts; Detroit, MI 48202
- Accession: 26.3

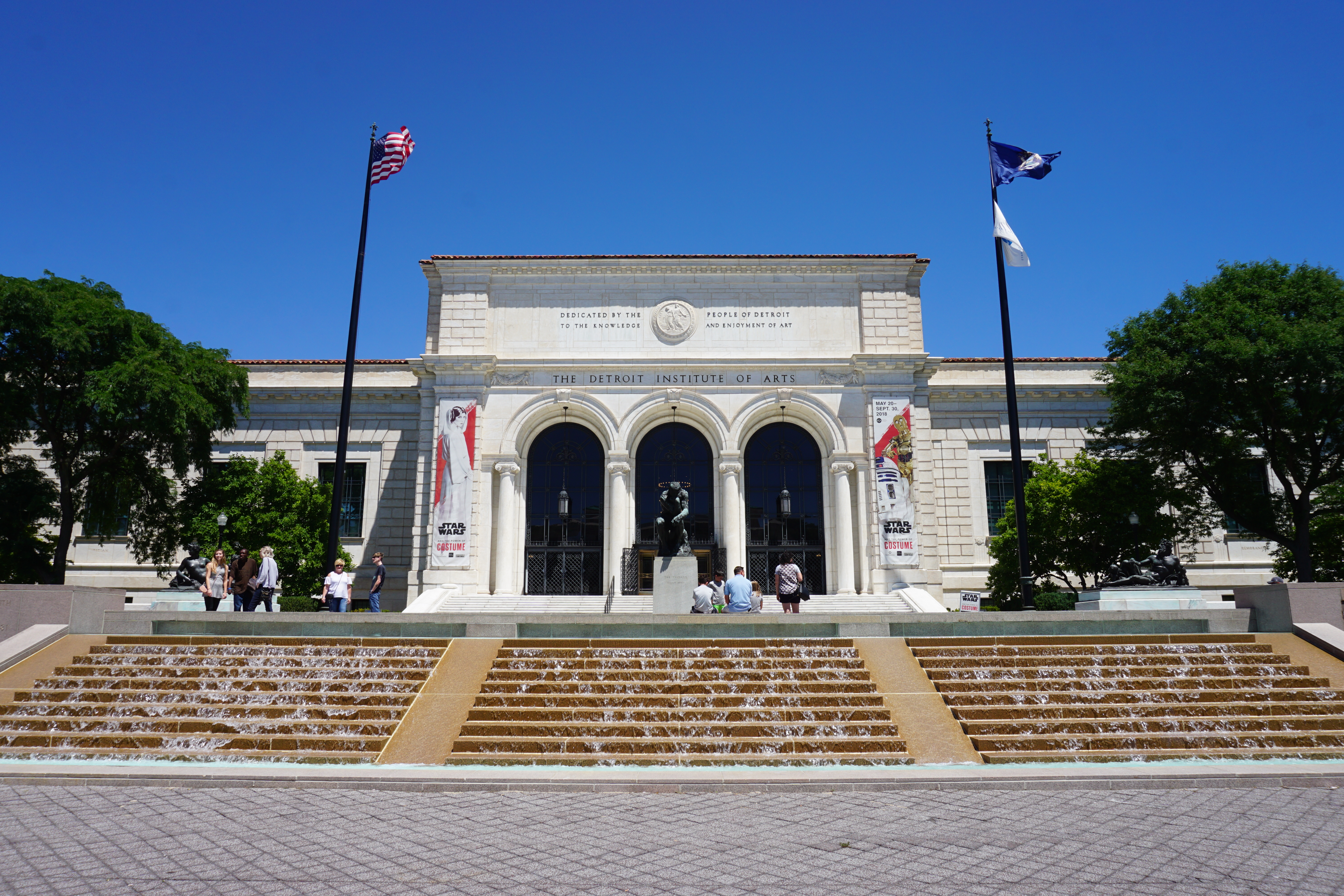
The Detroit Institute of Arts, where The Jewish Cemetery is located.

The Jewish Cemetery is an oil-on-canvas painting by the Dutch landscape painter Jacob van Ruisdael, now at the Detroit Institute of Arts.

The Jewish Cemetery is an allegorical landscape painting suggesting ideas of hope and death, while also depicting Beth Haim, a cemetery located on Amsterdam's southern outskirts, at the town of Ouderkerk aan de Amstel. Beth Haim is a resting place for some prominent figures among Amsterdam's large Jewish Portuguese community in the 17th century. The tomb monuments commemorate leaders of the newly arrived Portuguese-Jewish population. The central elements of the painting differ from what one would see in Ouderkerk, as Ruisdael made adjustments to achieve compositional and allegorical intent. The picture's physical dimensions are twice that of typical landscape painting from the 17th century. After being cataloged in England in 1835, the work disappeared from public display for many years, before emerging at various auctions in London and Berlin. The Detroit Institute of Arts acquired the painting in 1926 from Julius H. Haass, given in memory of his brother.

Jacob van Ruisdael created two versions of The Jewish Cemetery in 1653 and 1655 while in his mid-twenties, according to Erich Simon.

== Subject and symbols ==
In both versions, Jacob van Ruisdael presents the cemetery as a landscape variant of a vanitas painting. Vanitas works tend to be still-life or genre scenes, with skulls, books, flowers, and candles as common subjects in this theme. Similarly, Jacob van Ruisdael employed deserted tombs, ravaged churches, stormy clouds, dead trees, changing skies, and flowing water to symbolize death and the transience of all earthly things. Jacob Rosenberg and Seymour Slive describe the "compelling and tragic mood in nature" of the Jewish Cemetery—"a moralizing landscape .... painted with a deliberate allegorical programme."

The central building's foundations are overrun by leafy foliage arising from decaying wood in the foreground. Beyond, many likely symbols of death prevail. As the brook rushes over large stones under the broken arch, possibly symbolizing the fast-flowing passage of a human lifetime. That may correspond to beams of light that break through billowing rain or storm clouds in the upper sphere. The upright but broken column—here presented as a half-cylinder—likely signifies death. In addition to serving as a memento mori, a reminder of the inevitability of death, the painting may also offer themes of hope and renewal. Water constantly flows, changes, and regenerates in the stream, perhaps symbolizing life and aliveness while the decaying tree bending over it represents death's inevitable arrival. Nature revitalizes and replenishes neglected areas as they become submerged in encroaching woodland over time. Although a rainbow bears varied symbolic meanings, it often been regarded as a harbinger of hope and divine promise. At the top of the picture, the curve in the rainbow's arc may suggest a "bridge to the heavens." It has also been theorized to symbolize the renewal of life, connecting the work to a theological message: rabbis have said that the resurrection of the dead would be the first sign that the moshiach (the anointed one from the House of David) would be coming. This message would have been clear to Portuguese Sephardi, who would wait for this event from within Beth Chaim. It is possible that this added meaning would have been at the direction of a patron, though it is unknown who, if anyone, might have commissioned the painting.

=== Tombs ===
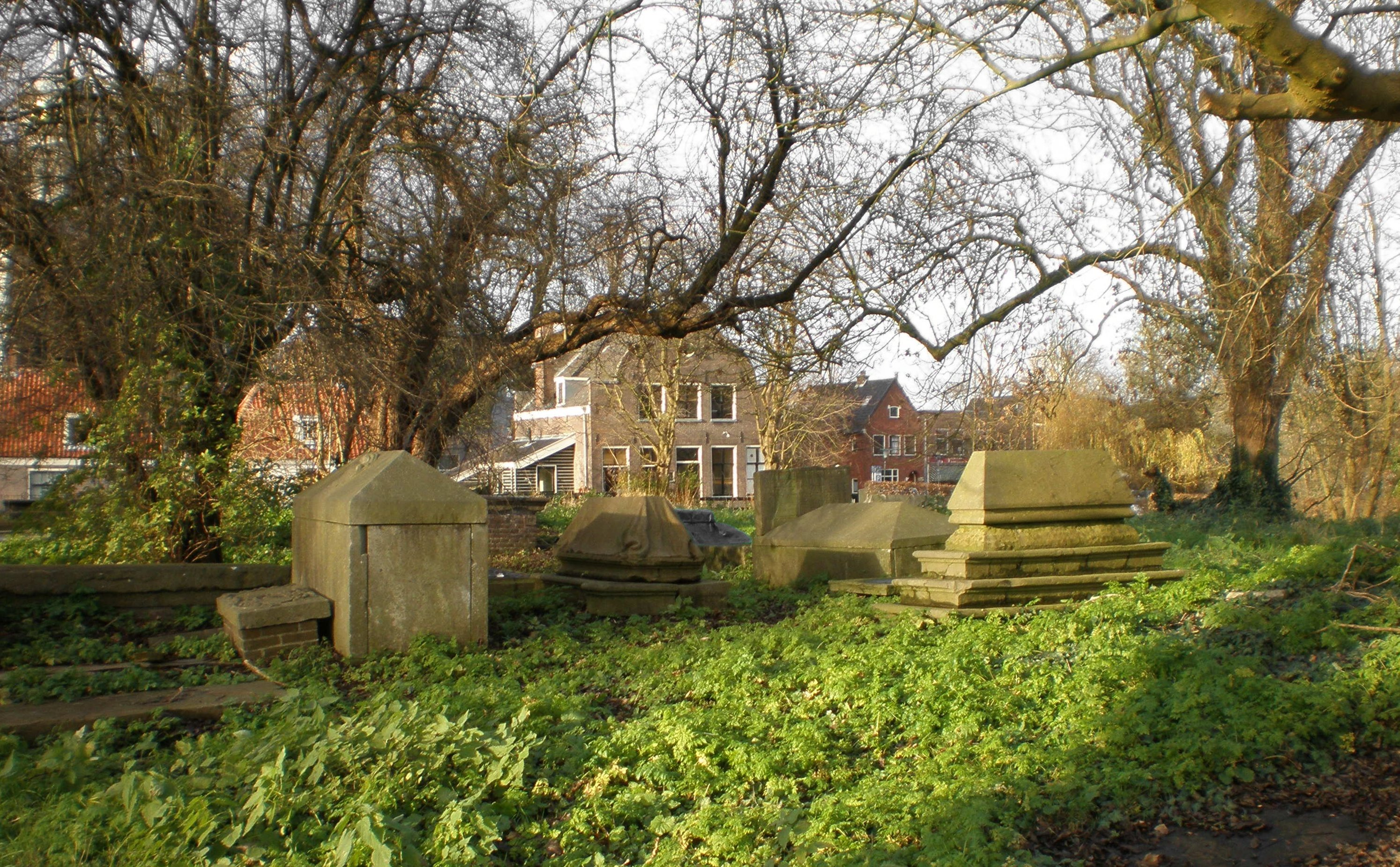
View of Beth Haim, some tombs that are depicted in the painting are visible.

Ruisdael's paintings depict tombs he would have observed when visiting Beth Hamin. (Michael Zell writes that "Ruisdael focuses on a corner of the cemetery, isolating four of the oldest, most unusual and most conspicuous Sephardi tombs" with "illegible pseudo-Hebraic inscriptions.") They marked the remains of the first Portuguese settlers in Amsterdam at the time, many of whom were from old families that had obtained wealth and noble titles before coming to Amsterdam. In the illuminated white marble tombstone, adorned with a large stone box and colorful cap, lie the remains of Elias (or Eliahu) Montalto. Dr. Montalto was physician to Maria de' Medici, and upon his death in 1616 his remains were brought to Ouderkerk for burial. Inscribed on the marble slab are Hebrew block letters. Montalto's first name is spelled out in an acrostic poem on the vertical rear plate.

In both versions of the painting, Ruisdael shows Montalto's tomb with light concentrated over it, as if that light is breaking through from the heavens to shine on his resting place. The shape and style of the tomb align with the style seen in the Levant, and not typical of tombs found in Holland. The carver of the tomb is unknown but it is likely that it was created in another country before being brought to Beth Haim. Ruisdael reproduced the oldest tombs in his works, shown in accord with the Old Testament belief that it was not proper to have images on tombs. Instead these grave sites are inscribed with Hebrew writing. In the painting, David Farrar's grave is barely visible behind Montalto's tomb—as a simple headpiece and a plain stone slab.

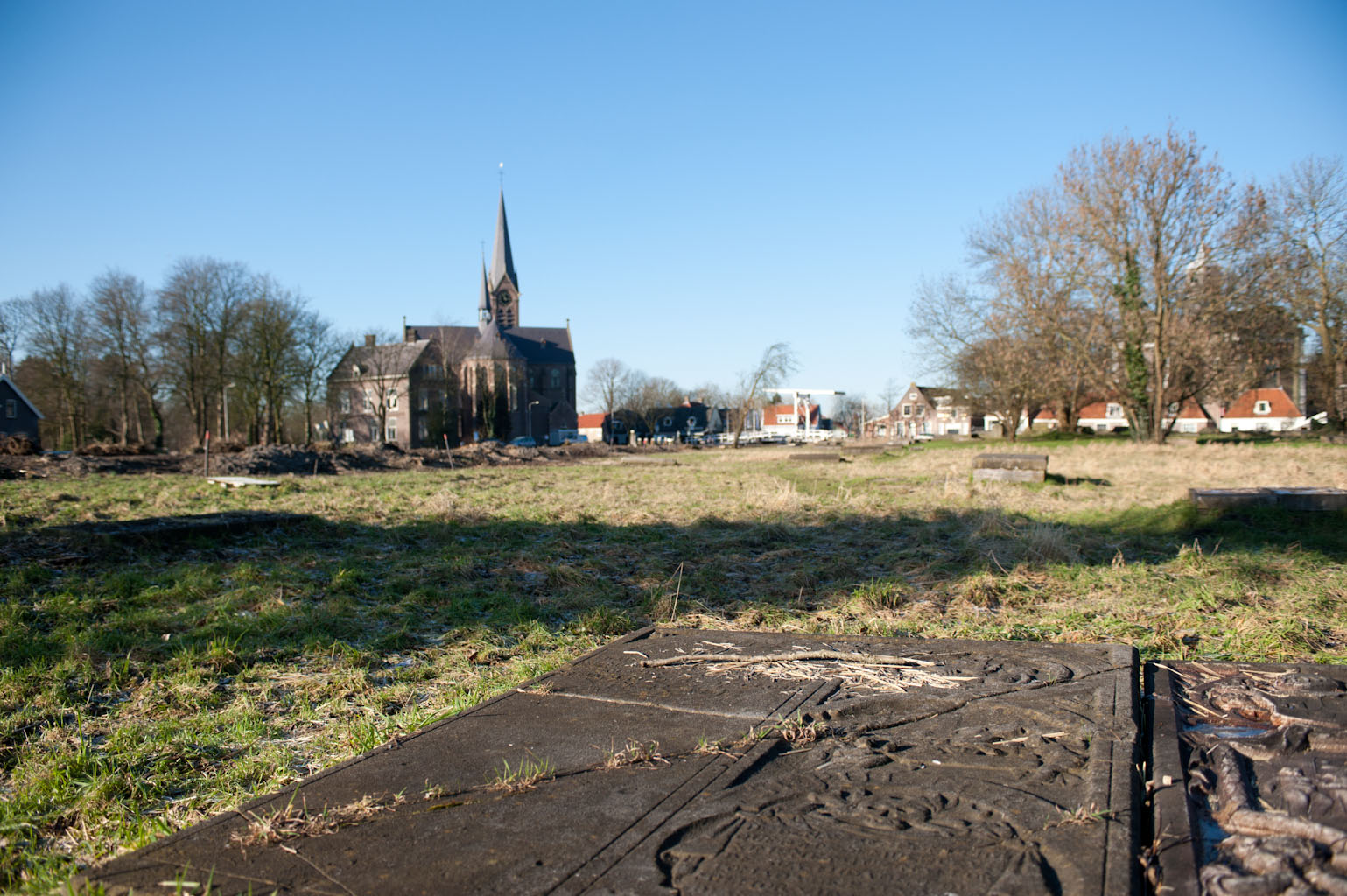
Beth Haim, with view of the church.

In the sarcophagus next to Montalto there is a carved cover made of red marble that bedecks Issac Uziel grave; the tomb is adorned with a veil of red-speckled marble, of symbolic significance. Uziel is presumed to have arrived in Amsterdam around 1615 and was the Haham, or Chief Rabbi, of the second community from 1617 to 1622 when he died. He was also a well known scholar of Hebrew, and likely taught the new immigrants much about Judaism. So respected when he died, it was decided that his tomb would require no inscription, as the greatness of his tomb would speak for the reputation of the man.

Alongside Uziel, to the right, is the largest tomb of the group, belonging to Abraham Israel Mendez. This tomb is described as having an impressive height and "prismatic simplicity." Mendez was one of the third Portuguese-Jewish community's governors and the inscription on his memorial describes him as "highly esteemed". On one side of the block the Mendez coat of arms appears, though barely legible and not depicted with any detail in the painting.

A dark tomb with a half-cylindrical column erected on top of the graves in the far left corner of the painting, separated from the other graves by a rushing stream and a broken, fallen bridge-like tree, dedicated to Abraham Franco Mendes o Velho ("the old one" in Portuguese). (He was also known as Abraham Franco O. Velho or Melchior Franco Mendez). In the painting, Ruisdael located the black stone tomb on the left edge, on the other side of the brook, although it was actually placed in front of the other three tombs at Beth Haim: Ruisdael's choice would have been for composition and coloration. Viewers eyes would be led to the tomb, as they follow the curves of the dead tree and eventually end up in front of the Mendez tomb. His tomb appears to be significant, as Ruisdael signed the horizontally lying half-column that crowned his grave. This half-column is thought to be the column that once decorated the top of the stone slab that was placed over the tombs of Mendez Velho and three other members of his family, linking them all together. The stone slab cracked around 1676 and the column fell off and was later made visible above ground, which is what Ruisdael captures in his paintings and prints, though he has placed it on the opposite side.

Also noted in Ruisdael's composition is what in the actual cemetery is a wooden post—presented in one of the Teylers drawings as a signpost, and in the Detroit painting as a stump, while in the Dresden version left out altogether. This wooden post would have been found near the tomb of Jacob Pereyra, itself a flat marble slab seen in both paintings and the drawing. Pereyra's grave appears decorated with a medallion encompassing a coat of arms. He reserved his tomb's location specifically for its proximity to the other three tombs. The tomb and signpost were both created move than half a century before his death.

Near these prominent tombs lies another burial site for a man of social prominence, Don Samuel Palache. Palache came to Amsterdam as an ambassador for Muley Sidan, the king of Morocco. In Beth Haim the actual tomb comprises a slab decorated with a coat of arms consisting of lion and a coronet, along with Hebrew inscriptions detailing his rank and notable accomplishments. In Ruisdael's painting the tomb appears to be away from the other three graves, placed on the other side of the brook, at the left of the painting. The lower edge of the tomb is in the water and instead of the detailed coat of arms that adorns Palache's actual grave, the painting shows merely a letter sign, similar to a 'Y'. Some scholars have interpreted this as Ruisdael's way of signifying death's inevitability, and that regardless of one's status or wealth, there is no protection from death.

In the center of the composition, a pair of white tombs are flanked by the figures of three mourners—a Jewish family, including a father, mother, and boy, dressed in black, and reflected in the middle distance by the lids of two elongated pyramids. These tombs have been identified by Zwarts based on the Portuguese inscriptions, as belonging to Rafael Hiskias Athias and his wife Raquel.

== Location and context ==
https://www.atlasenkaart.nl/toonkaart.php?kaart=2272 On the southern outskirts of Amsterdam is the village of Ouderkerk aan de Amstel, and its Beth Haim (House of Life) cemetery lies by the Amstel River provides the subject matter of Jacob van Ruisdael's painting. David Henrique De Castro was the first to connect the marble tomb in Dresden painting to the Portuguese-Jewish cemetery in Ouderkerk. The site was also visited by other artists, including Rembrandt. Rembrandt was struck by its unusual beauty in the Ouderkerk church's steeple, with its decorative knob-like projections. Frits Lugt discovered the structure in a pen-and-ink drawing by Rembrandt. Jacob van Ruisdael made sketches that demonstrate his awareness of the surroundings early in his career. During his trip to Ouderkerk, the artist still lived with his father in his native Haarlem. At that time, Ouderkerk had a small Jewish community, but Haarlem was the first city in Holland to allow Jews to practice openly. Following the fall of Granada in 1492, Ferdinand and Isabella granted full power to the Inquisition, which drove Jews from Spain, leading to the arrival of Portuguese-Jewish refugees in Amsterdam, around 1590. In Amsterdam, many Portuguese Jews reverted to Judaism after generations of being forced to live as Catholics in the Iberian peninsula. Since its founding in 1614, the year Jews became officially religiously free, the Jewish cemetery in Ouderkerk saw the burial of Sephardic refugees who fled the Inquisition from Spain and Portugal. The Jewish cemetery there was thus emblematic of Jews' freedom in Amsterdam.

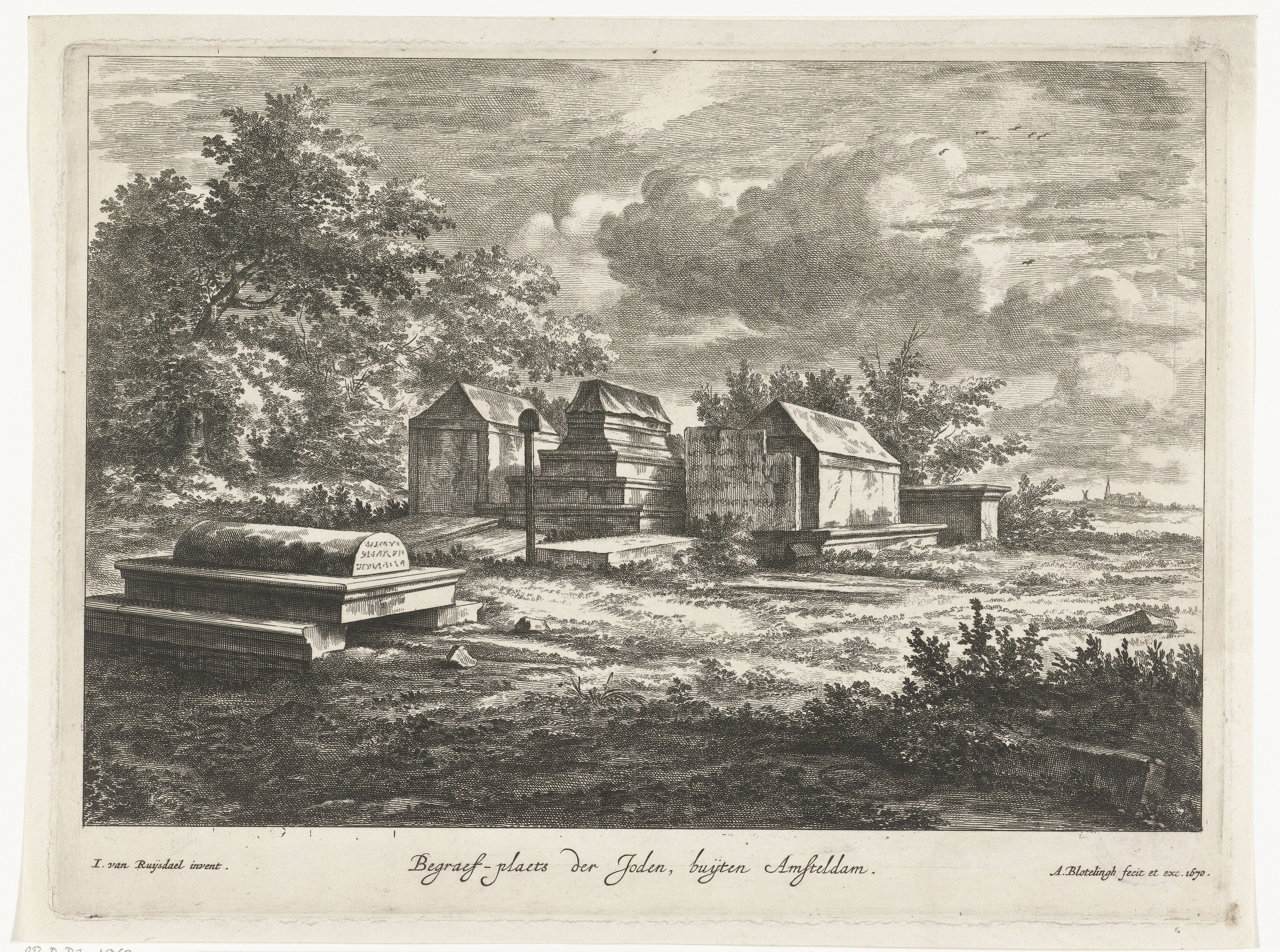
Print of the cemetery at Ouderkerk from ca. 1862

Many of the largest elements depicted in the painting do not represent how Ouderkerk really appears, including the church ruins: there was neither a castle nor church on the grounds, nor any small timber building nearby, nor hills or rushing streams, all of which Jacob van Ruisdael must have invented. Svetlana Alpers finds "radical changes wrought on a site ... which nears, in this regard, his imaginary representation of swamps." Only the tombs in Beth Haim cemetery are similar to those in the painting. The drawing of the ruined remains of Egmond aan den Hoef Castle were depicted in his Dresden painting. In the Detroit version, the scene contains what was left of the Romanesque Abbey of Egmond Binnen, near Alkmaar. The abbey had been sacrificed during the Dutch revolt against Spain over 80 years before Ruisdael painted it. Landscape artists like Jacob van Ruisdael may have selected representative sites of the Dutch Republic, such as ruins, windmills, and city views, to illustrate Dutch patriotism. In his Haarlem studio, he added the additional landscape elements to render compositional and allegorical elements into the scene. These features are found in sketches Jacob van Ruisdael made at other locations, but do not appear in the Ouderkerk landscape.

== Provenance ==
The known provenance for the painting dates back only to 1739 and its original owner is not documented. While it is not known whether the painting was produced under commission, some scholars have theorized that it was possibly made for a member of Montalto's family, as his tomb is prominent in the image and is highlighted with a concentration of light leading the eye to the tomb as if the light were coming from the heavens. On September 22, 1783 the painting was sold at an auction of Pieter Locquet's collection in Amsterdam, before appearing again at auctions in Paris in 1790 and 1802. Around 1815 the painting was purchased from a banker in Paris by Huybens, who imported the work into England. It was sold three more times, including the 1828 sale to the Mackintosh collection, where it was later catalogued in 1835. The Jewish Cemetery ceased to be exhibited publicly some time after it was cataloged in England in 1835. In the 1920s, the painting was rediscovered in London and by 1925 it was included in the Kaiser Friedrich Museum Museumsverein exhibition Old Masters from Berlin Collections, in Berlin. In 1926, the painting was donated to The Detroit Institute of Arts by Mr. Julius H. Haass, in memory of his brother Dr. Ernest W. Haass.

== Other versions ==
In Dresden, there was another version of the same composition, that some scholars believe was created after the Detroit painting. The Dresden painting is described as having the qualities of a more developed technique: lighter brushwork, a strong and simple structure, and greater perspective and clarity in the artist's approach. In comparison, the Detroit painting has forms that are more natural, firmer brushwork, and stronger, brighter, color. It is unknown if the paintings were commissioned or who their early owners were. However, Montalto's white illuminated marble tomb appears prominently in both paintings. Therefore, Jacob van Ruisdael might have been commissioned to paint it by a member of his family. There is also a possibility that he was merely exploring the dramatic aspects of a landscape. These paintings show a step back from the Haarlem realism that most of Ruisdael's landscapes represent. Many of his landscapes, even if they did not depict any real or identifiable location, would be painted in a realistic manner. Ruisdael's cemetery paintings however, show a more dramatic and "wonderous realm." Both paintings are thought to have been created around 1653-55 and show a very similar depiction of the three tombs that are visible in the right foreground. Many other aspects of the paintings differ, however; the Dresden painting has a more "concentrated composition" with an emphasis on the vertical axis, which is made clear by the proportions of the church ruins and the flow of the stream, unlike the Detroit painting where the stream flows through the image quietly. The Dresden painting shares the moral lesson in general, less localized, ways while the Detroit painting uses the Romanesque church tower and other key features to keep the painting tied to the specific location of Ouderkerk.

A potential third painting, a panel, appeared in Rotterdam at an auction on October 11, 1855. Its current location, however, remains unknown. The Teyler Museum in Haarlem, Amsterdam, also houses two sketches of the cemetery. Both drawings are rigorously topographical, without figures, and stylistically equivalent. Similar to Detroit and Dresden paintings, the tombs are realistically depicted. The drawings are finished works, signed by the artist, and not just sketches for the paintings though they are clearly related. They became well known in the late 1670s, as they were reproduced by the engraver Abraham Blooteling, and later were used in a pair of etchings by Romeyn de Hooghe that depicted the Ouderkerk cemetery.

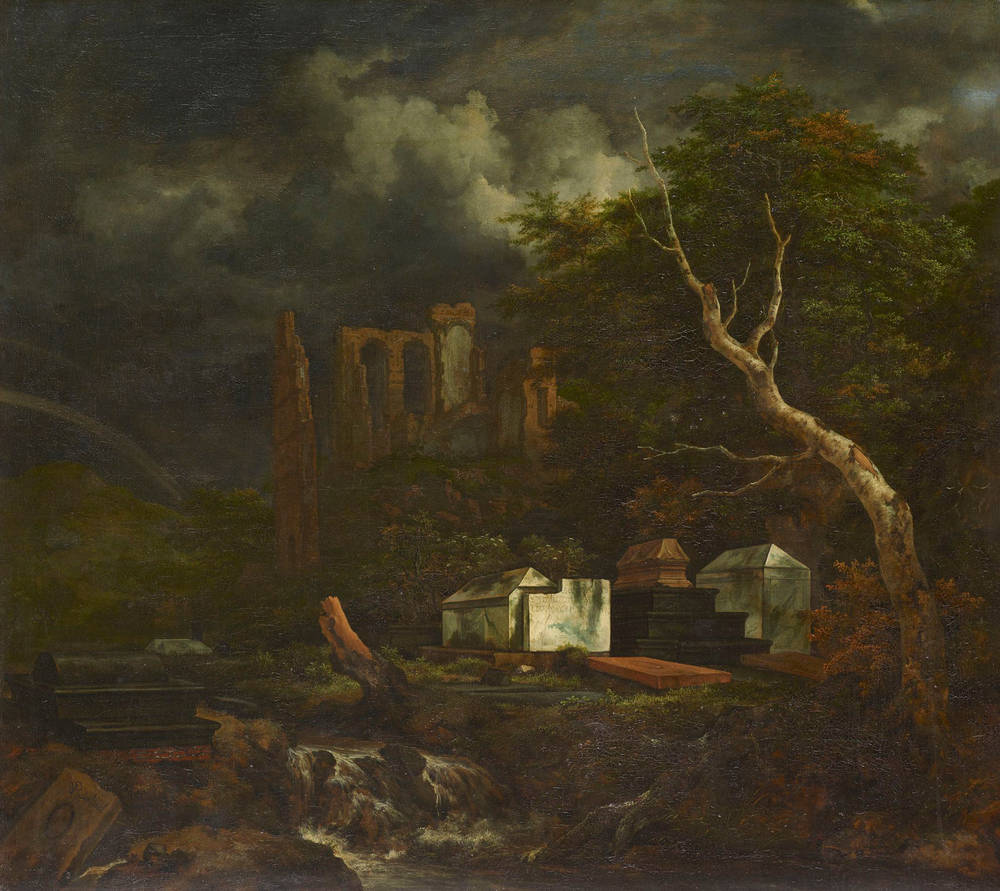
The painting referred to as a duplicate above (considered genuine by later experts) Gemäldegalerie Alte Meister.

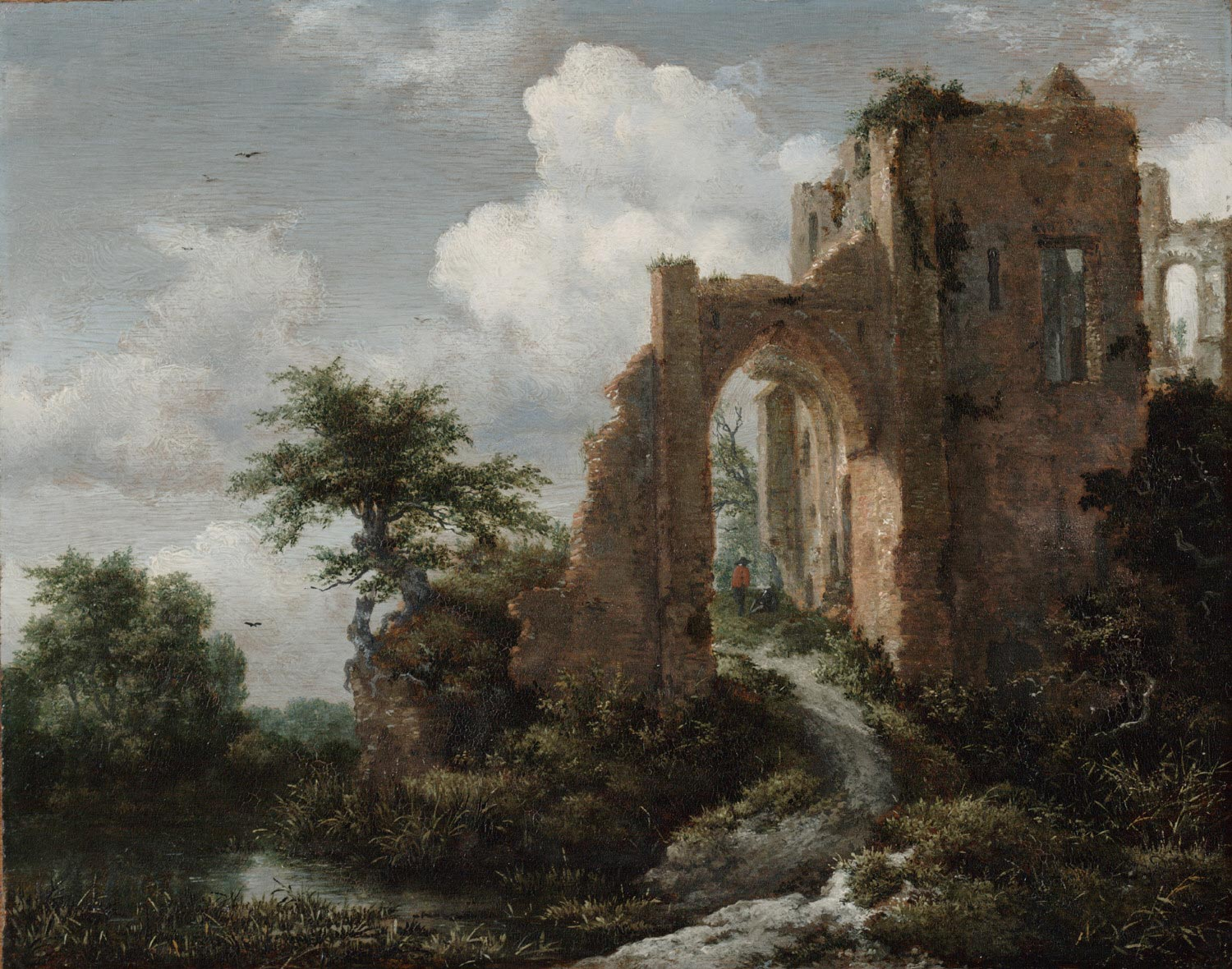
Philadelphia Museum of Art.

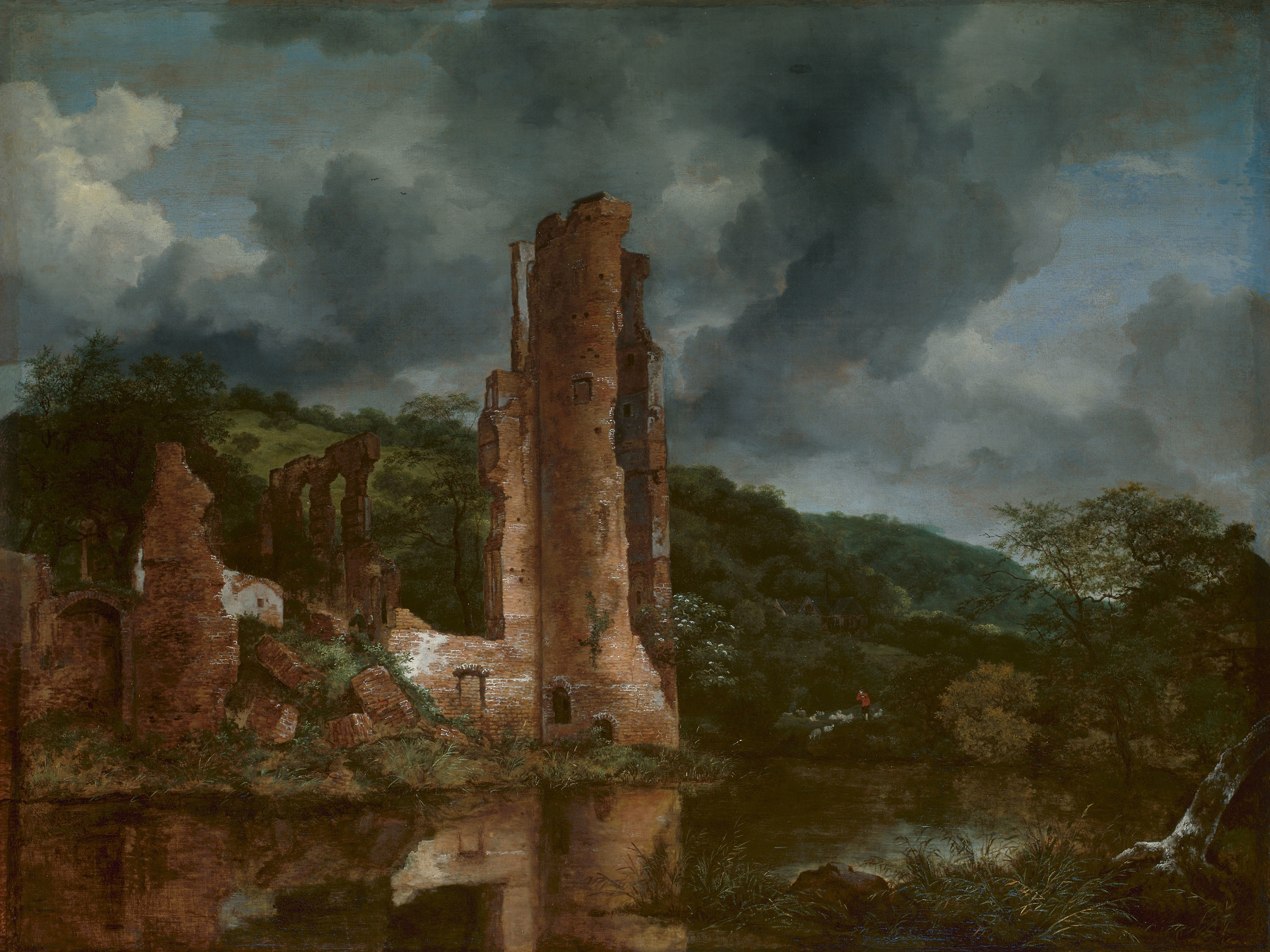
Art Institute of Chicago.

== Exhibitions ==
- Rings: Five Passions in World Art, High Museum of Art, Atlanta, Georgia, July 4, 1996 – September 29, 1996.
- The Glory of the Golden Age, Rijksmuseum, Amsterdam, April 15, 2000 – September 17, 2000.
- Rembrandt and the Golden Age: Highlights from the Detroit Institute of Arts, Detroit Institute of Arts and the Frist Center for Visual Arts, Nashville, Tennessee, February 1, 2013 – May 19, 2013.

== See also ==
- List of paintings by Jacob van Ruisdael
