= Zechuto Yagen Aleinu =

Jewish blessing of the dead

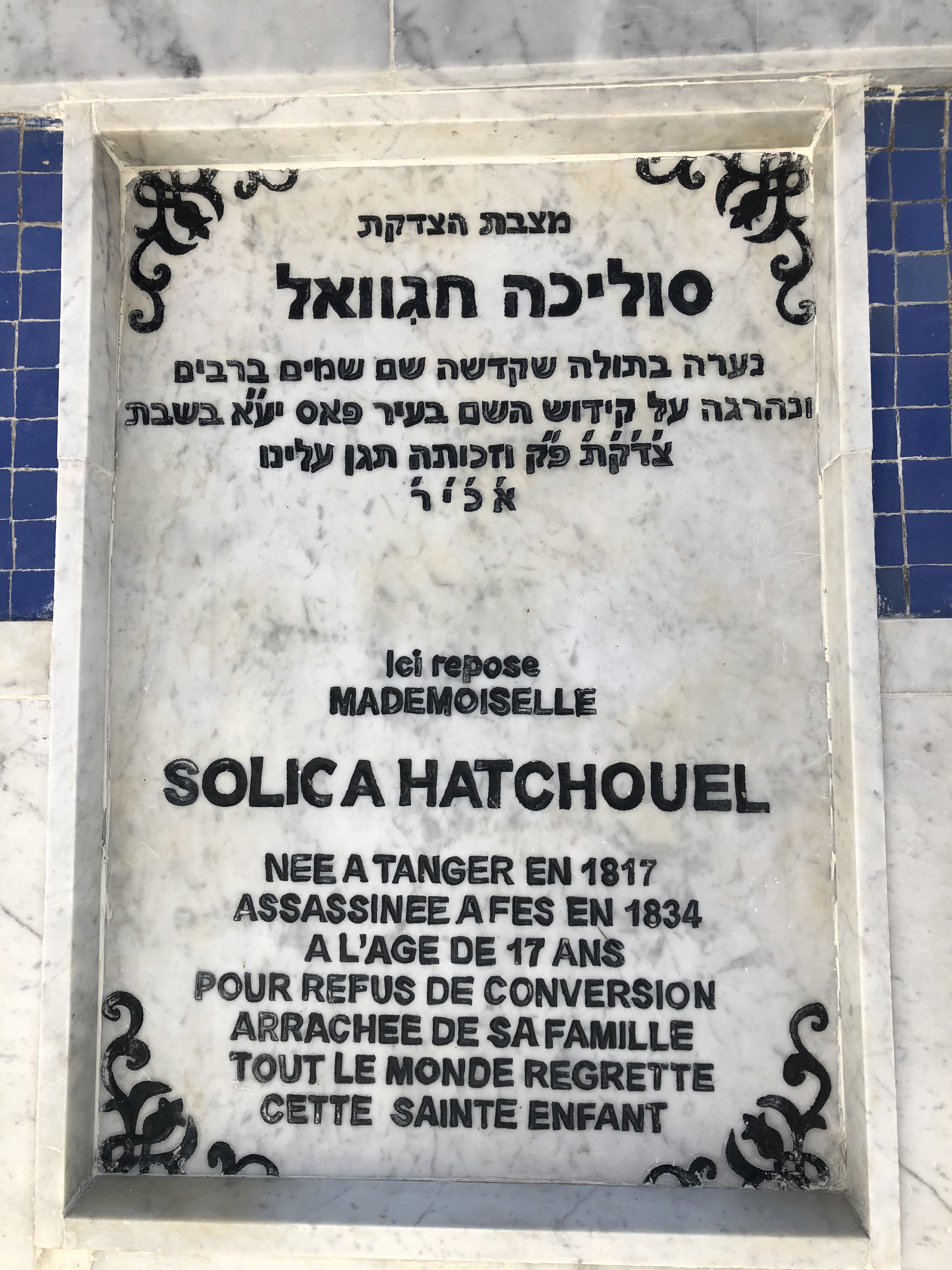
Jewish grave with "Zechuta Tagen Aleinu" written on it.

Zechuto Yagen Aleinu (Hebrew: זְכוּתוֹ יגֵן עָלֵינוּ, lit. 'may his merit protect us', Abbr: ZY"A, זי"ע ,זיע"א) is a Jewish blessing of the dead that is added after the names of Tzadiks, Hasidics and important Jewish figures. It is a common blessing among Kabbalah Jews and Hasidic Jews. It's mainly added as an abbreviation in different ways, shapes or forms.

== Origin ==
The first known mention of the phrase appears in the Yehi Ratzon prayer, recited before the psalms, as found in the book Sheari Tzion written by Rabbi Nathan ben Moses Hannover, a Ruthenian Jewish historian, Talmudist, and kabbalist.

The origin of the blessing is likely derived from the Piyyut "El Mistater": "יָהּ זְכוּת אָבוֹת יָגֵן עָלֵינוּ" (Yah, the merit of the forefathers will protect us).

== History ==
The phrase's usage was uncommon prior to the 18th century. One of the earliest frequent instances of this blessing can be found in the writings of Chaim Yosef David Azulai (the Hida חיד"א), particularly in his work Shem HaGedolim. The blessing is used in the works of Rabbi Moses Hagiz, Rabbi David Pardo and Rabbi Levi Yitzchok of Berditchev.

=== Modern days ===
In modern days, the sentence "Zechuto tagen aleinu v'al kol Yisroel" (may his merit protect us and the whole of Israel) is commonly used among Zionist Jews. This expression likely originated in the 20th century and is often recited during the hillula (memorial celebration) of Rabbi Israel Abuhatzeira, known as the Baba Sali.
