= Pardo (disambiguation) =

Pardo is a word used in the Spanish colonies in the Americas to refer to the tri-racial descendants of Europeans, Amerindians, and Africans.

Pardo may also refer to:

== People ==
- Pardo (surname)
- Pardo Brazilians, a race/skin color category used by the Brazilian Institute of Geography and Statistics (IBGE) in Brazilian censuses

== Other ==
- Pardo Ridge, the highest part of Elephant Island, South Shetland Islands, UK
- Pardo River (disambiguation)
- Capivari River (Pardo River)
- Claro River (Pardo River)
- Novo River (Pardo River)
- Palmital River (Pardo River)
- Rio Pardo (tribe)
- Rio Pardo, a municipality in Rio Grande do Sul, Brazil
- Rio Pardo de Minas, a municipality in Minas Gerais, Brazil
- Vargem Grande do Rio Pardo, a municipality in Minas Gerais, Brazil
- Ribas do Rio Pardo, a municipality in Mato Grosso do Sul, Brazil
- Santa Rita do Pardo, a municipality in Mato Grosso do Sul, Brazil
- Santa Cruz do Rio Pardo, a municipality in São Paulo, Brazil
- São José do Rio Pardo, a municipality in São Paulo, Brazil
- Pardo Miguel District, a district of the Rioja Province, Peru
- Abelardo Pardo Lezameta District, a district of the Bolognesi Province, Peru
- Mark Pardo Shellworks Site, an archaeological site in Florida
- Jacarandá-Pardo
- Trabb Pardo–Knuth algorithm
- Sport José Pardo, a Peruvian football club
- AD El Pardo, a Spanish football club
- El Pardo, a ward of Madrid
- Royal Palace of El Pardo, palace in the same-named ward of Madrid
- Treaty of El Pardo (disambiguation)

== See also ==
- Pardoe (disambiguation)
- Pardos (disambiguation)
