= Symfomania =

Radio Show

Symfomania Rock Show (in Dutch: Symfomania-Rockshow) is a Dutch radio show broadcasting since September 4, 1994. It emphasizes symphonic, progressive and melodic rock music. The disk jockey is DJGJ.

During its early years, the show was broadcast via a local radio station, Nieuwegein-Radio in the Netherlands. The name of the show was originally '"Late Night Symfo." During the first two years the show lasted one hour, and was extended to two hours in 1996. Nieuwegein-Radio stopped transmitting on January 1, 2003 and the show stopped temporarily. Starting July 1, 2003 Symfomania Rock Show was broadcast via Radio Seagull.

The radio show is broadcast on two radio stations in the Netherlands, Radio Seagull and PopRockFM. In the past, several other Radio Stations broadcast Symfomania Rock Show: Avatar Music in Winnipeg (Canada), Excellent FM in Ouderkerk aan de Amstel (the Netherlands) Spix FM in Rotterdam (the Netherlands), DigitaalHitRadio (the Netherlands), Hoex Radio (the Netherlands) and Radio Bingo in Roeselare, Belgium.
