= Josiah Pardo =

Rabbi Josiah ben David Pardo

Personal life
- Born: 1626 Amsterdam
- Died: August 27, 1684 (aged 57–58) Port Royal
- Buried: Hunts Bay Cemetery, Jamaica
- Spouse: Sarah (daughter of Saul Levi Morteira)
- Children: Saul Pardo (Brown)
- Parent(s): David Pardo; Rachel Sanchez

Religious life
- Religion: Judaism
- Synagogue: Curaçao synagogue Mikvé Israel
- Began: 1674
- Ended: 1683
- Other: hakham

Josiah ben David Pardo (Josiau Pardo, Jesia Hisquiyahu Pardo, Hebrew: יאשיהו בן דוד; 1626–1684) was a Dutch rabbi and hakham, who served as a Rabbi in Willemstad, Curaçao and in Port Royal, Jamaica. Josiah Pardo was one of the first rabbis who settled in the New World and a pioneer of many Jewish communal and educational institutions in the Western Hemisphere.

Josiah was born in 1626 in Amsterdam to Rabbi David Pardo and Rachel Pardo (Sanchez). Josiah originated from a prominent Sephardic rabbinical family of Venice, Amsterdam and Thessaloniki. Josiah's grandfather, Joseph Pardo (died 1619), was born in Thessaloniki and served as a Rabbi of Venice. Josiah’s father, David Pardo, served as a Rabbi of Amsterdam since 1618. Josiah was a disciple and son-in-law of Saul Levi Morteira (who, himself, was a disciple of Leon of Modena).

Josiah was a teacher at the Yesiba de los Pintos in Rotterdam, which was transferred to Amsterdam in 1669, and was also Hakham of the Honen Dallim benevolent society. He emigrated to Curaçao, where he became a Hakham in 1674. He served as a first leader of the Congregation Mikvé Israel in Curaçao for nine years. Josiah has established a school and several other institutions of the community. While the first Rabbi in America and Western Hemisphere was Isaac Aboab da Fonseca (1605-1693), who became a Rabbi of Pernambuco in Brazil in 1642, Josiah Pardo was, apparently, the first one who settled outside Brazil.

In 1683 Josiah departed to Jamaica, which was an unusual decision since the Curaçao Jewish community was economically better off at that time. Possibly, a conflict with influential leaders (parnasim) of the Mikvé Israel community was the reason for his departure. In the 1670s, Port Royal had a reputation of a center of piracy. The synagogue "on the Jewe's street" of Port Royal was built at about 1677.

Josiah Pardo's later fate and his date of death were unknown until his gravestone was identified in 2008 at the historical Jewish cemetery of Port Royal in Hunts Bay. The gravestone has an image of the skull and crossbones, which, contrary to the popular perception, was not a pirate symbol but a symbol of death when appeared on gravestones. The epitaph calls him, in Judaeo-Portuguese "Famozo H.H. Morenu Arab R Yosiau David Ab Bet Din deste K.K. que para si recolleu Ds. Em 17 de elul de 5444" ("Famous our teacher, Rabbi Yosiau [ben] David, the head of the Rabbinical court of this sacred community, who called by the Lord on 17th of Elul 5444") and then in Hebrew quotes 2 Kings 22:2 "Josiah did what was right in the sight of the Lord, and walked in all the way of David his father and turned not aside to the right hand or to the left." The date corresponds to August 27, 1684 of the Gregorian calendar. In 1691, the Jews of Curaçao introduced a special memorial prayer (or hashcabah) for Josiah.

Josiah Pardo's son, Saul Pardo (died in 1702), moved to New York where he was the first hazzan of the first New York Jewish Congregation Shearith Israel; however, later he returned to Curaçao to join his aunt Rachel Dovale, who was either Josiah’s sister-in-law or a half-sister from the first marriage of his father.

== See also ==
- Curaçao synagogue
- Jewish Pirates
- Sephardic Jews in the Netherlands
- Spanish and Portuguese Jews
