= Pardos =

Pardos may refer to:

- Plural of pardo, a race/skin color category used by the Brazilian Institute of Geography and Statistics (IBGE) in Brazilian censuses.
- Pardos, Guadalajara, a municipality in the province of Guadalajara, Castile-La Mancha, Spain.
- Pardos (catepan) was the catepan of Italy briefly in 1042 following the short term of George Maniakes.

== See also ==
- Pardo (disambiguation)
