= Beth Haim of Ouderkerk aan de Amstel =

Historic Jewish cemetery in North Holland, Netherlands

Beth Haim
- בית חיים
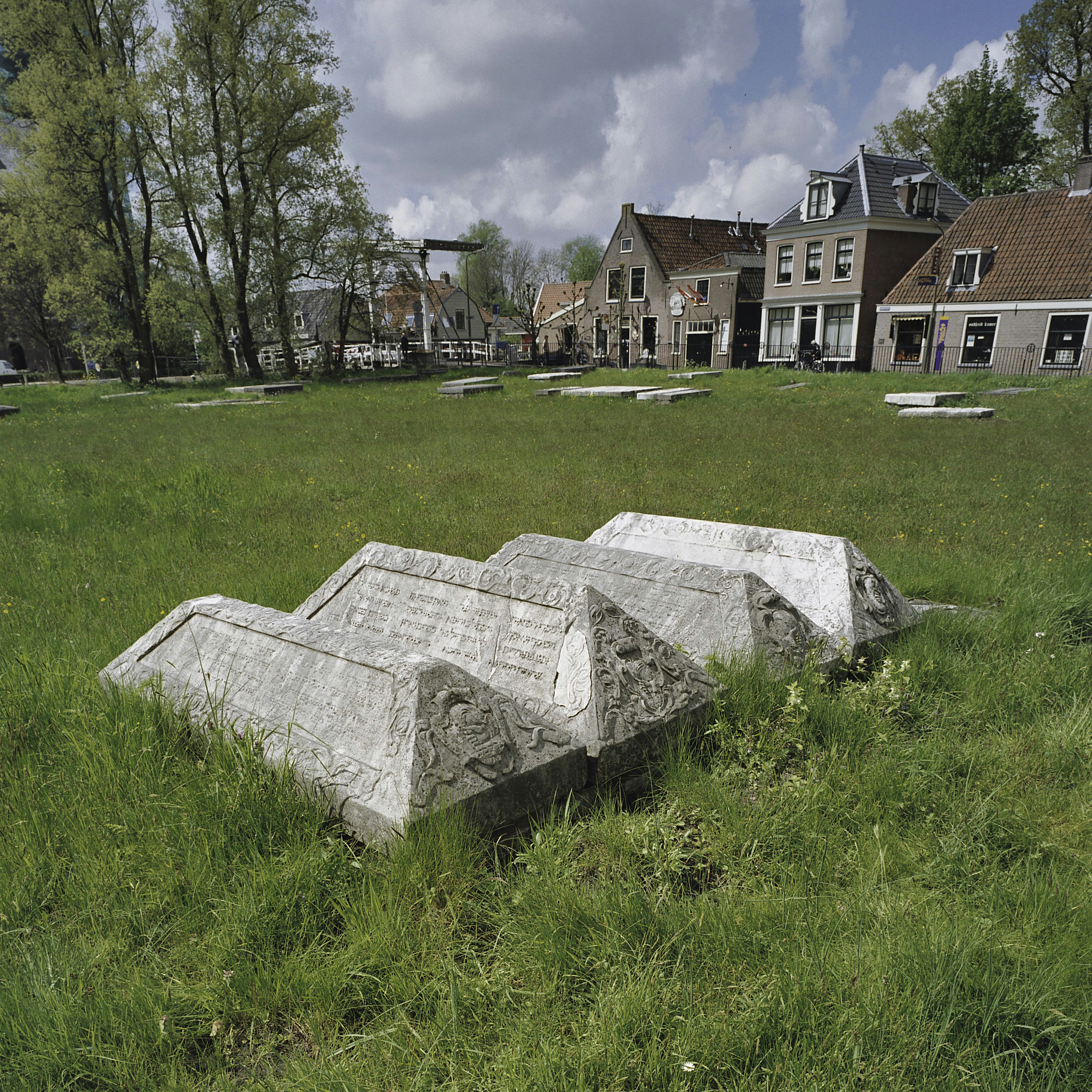
- Grave markers in the cemetery's southwestern corner, facing Ouderkerk's historic drawbridge over the Bullewijk branch of the Amstel, 2005
- Interactive map of Beth Haim

Details
- Established: 1614; 411 years ago
- Location: Ouderkerk aan de Amstel
- Country: Netherlands
- Coordinates: 52°17′43″N 4°54′15″E
- Type: Jewish
- Size: 4 hectares (9.9 acres)
- No. of interments: 28,000+
- Website: www.bethhaim.nl

Rijksmonument
- Designated: 15 December 1970
- Reference no.: 31967

The Beth Haim of Ouderkerk aan de Amstel (Note: Beth Haim, meaning House of Life in translation, is a transliteration of the Hebrew words: בית חיים (Hebrew is read leftwardly: from right to left)) is the oldest Jewish cemetery in the Netherlands.

== History ==
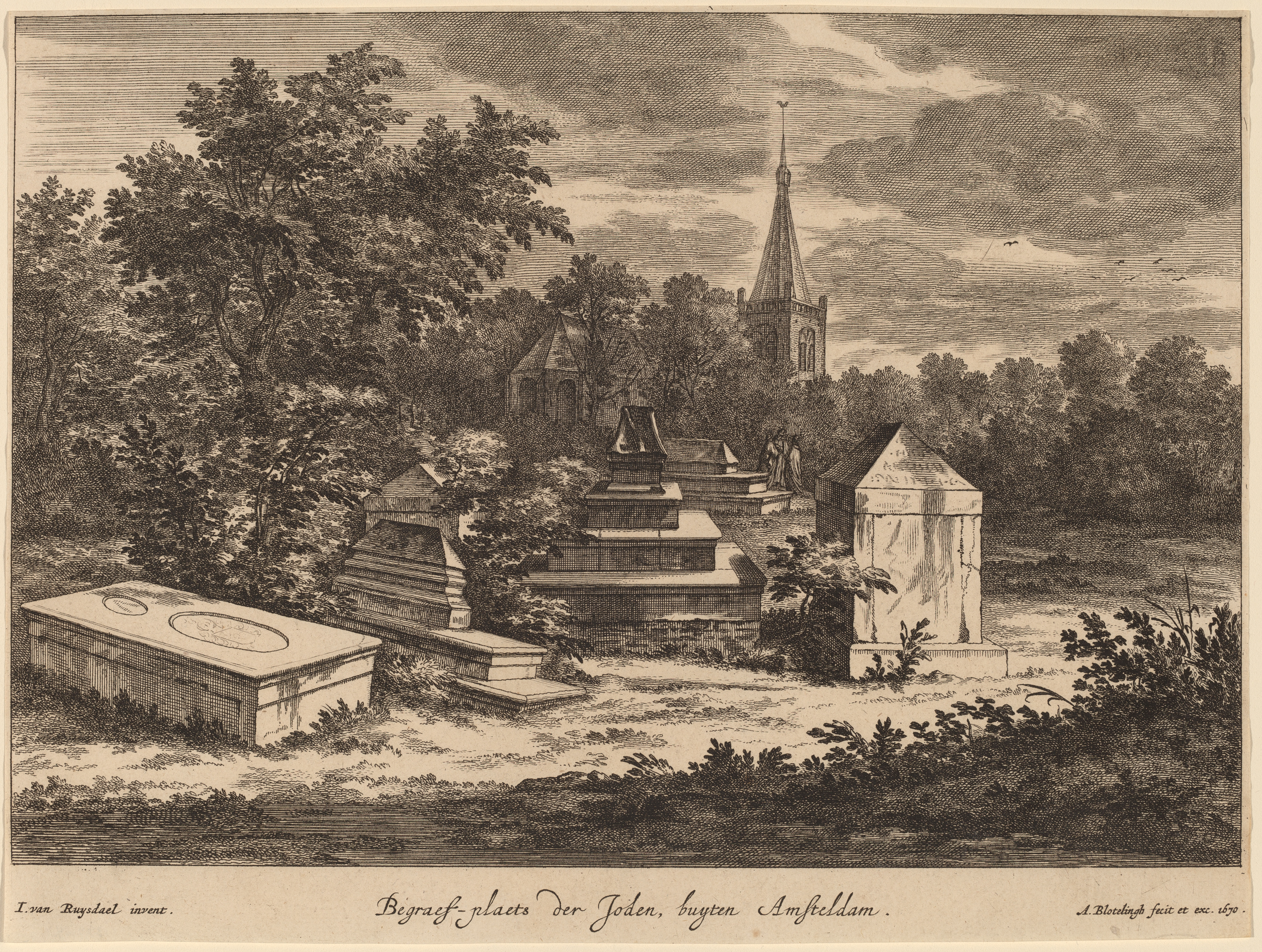
Jewish Cemetery, outside Amsterdam, c. 1670 etching print

The land was purchased in 1614 by the Jewish community of Amsterdam for use as a burial ground. It is situated in the village of Ouderkerk aan de Amstel, in the rural outskirts south of Amsterdam.

The Jewish population of Amsterdam in the early modern period consisted largely of Sephardic Jews from the Iberian Peninsula, many of whom had fled persecution in Spain and Portugal.

== Facilities ==
=== Monuments ===
In addition to its age, the cemetery is notable for several features. Many of its tombstones bear inscriptions in Portuguese, Dutch, and Hebrew. Unusually for a Jewish cemetery, a significant number of the stones also display sculptural reliefs, including representations of human figures.

=== Visitation ===
The cemetery is open to visitors and is free of charge.

== Notable burials ==
Famous people buried at the Beth Haim include:

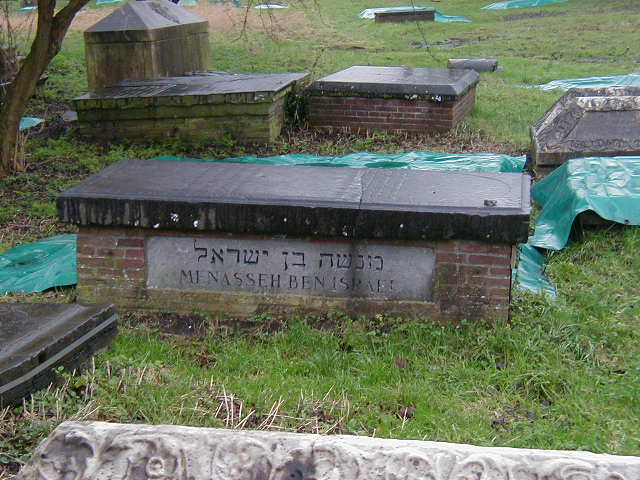
Grave of Menasseh Ben Israel

- Samuel Pallache (ca. 1550–1616), Moroccan diplomat
- Joseph Pallache (c. 1580 – 1638/1648/1657) merchant and diplomat
- numerous members of the Pallache family (subsequently known as: "Palache") descendants of brothers Samuel and Joseph Pallache
- Menasseh Ben Israel (1604–1657), rabbi and friend of the artist Rembrandt van Rijn
- Joseph Pardo (ca. 1561–1619), Italian rabbi
- David Pardo (ca. 1591–1657), Dutch rabbi and son of Joseph Pardo
- Eliahu Montalto (1604–1657), personal physician to Maria de Medici (of the Medici family)
- Joseph Pardo (ca. 1624–1677), English hazzan
- the philosopher Baruch Spinoza's parents (16th–17th centuries)
- Maup Caransa (1916-2009), real estate developer

== In culture ==
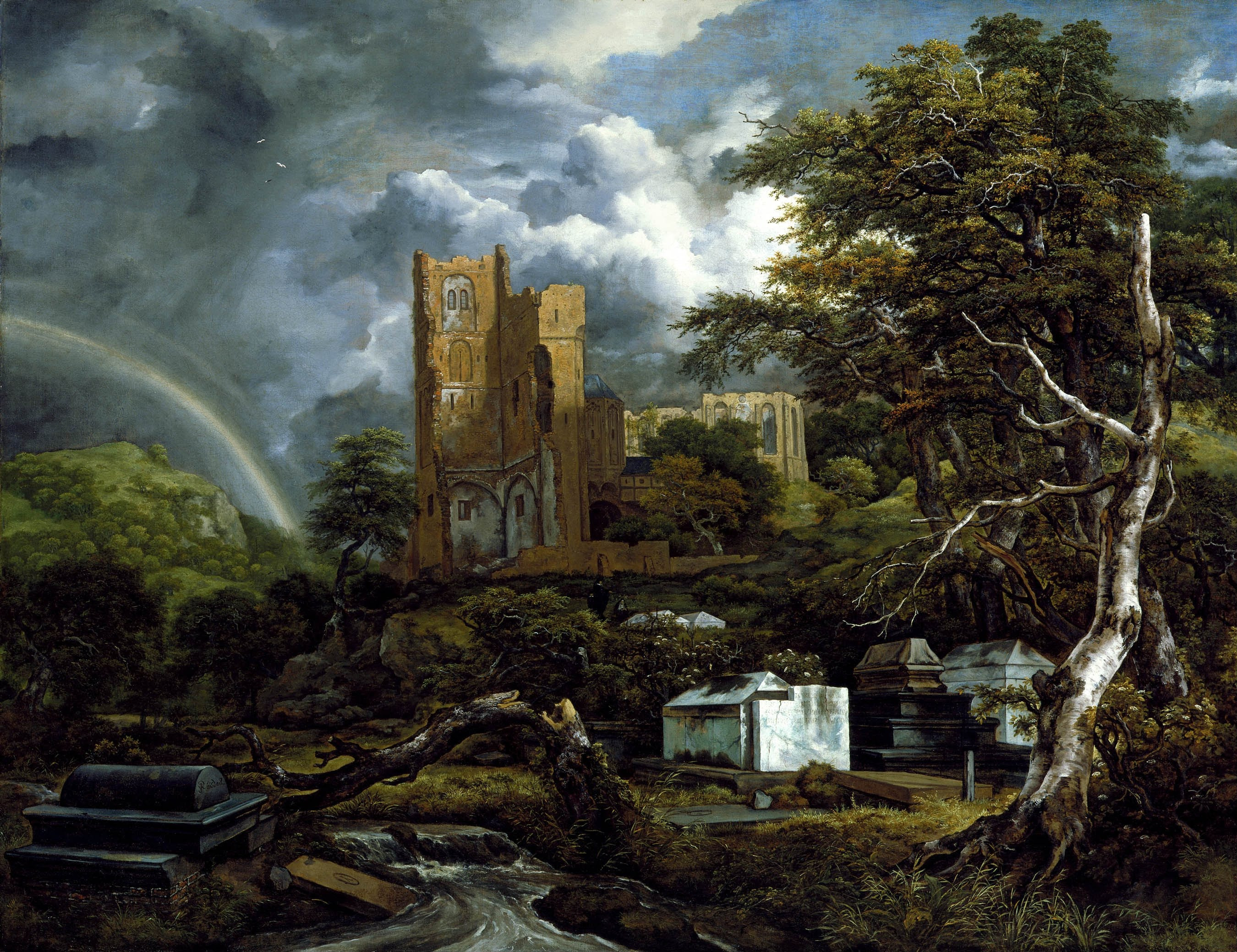
The Jewish Cemetery, one of the paintings by Jacob van Ruisdael

Two paintings by Jacob van Ruisdael were inspired by Beth Haim. Although the paintings are usually called in English "The Jewish Cemetery at Ouderkerk", the artist felt free to add picturesque elements, and they therefore do not closely resemble the actual location.

== See also ==
- History of the Jews in the Netherlands
