= Pardoe =

Pardoe is a surname, and may refer to:

- Blaine Pardoe, American science fiction writer and military historian
- Geoffrey Pardoe (1928–1996), English rocket scientist
- Glyn Pardoe (1946–2020), English former footballer
- John Pardoe (born 1934), retired British businessman and Liberal Party politician
- Julia Pardoe (1804–1862), English poet and novelist
- Margot Pardoe (1902–1996), English children's author
- Matthew Pardoe (born 1991), English cricketer
- T. Earl Pardoe (1885–1971), American drama teacher
- Thomas Pardoe (painter) (1770–1823), English enameler
- Thomas Pardoe (boxer) (1911–1992), English boxer

== See also ==
- Pardo (disambiguation)
