= Pardo River =

Pardo River or Rio Pardo may refer to:

== Brazil ==
- Pardo River (Amazonas), a river of Amazonas state in north-western Brazil
- Pardo River (Bahia), a river of Bahia state in eastern Brazil
- Pardo River (Das Velhas River), a river of Minas Gerais state in southeastern Brazil
- Pardo River (Mato Grosso do Sul), a river of Mato Grosso do Sul state in southwestern Brazil
- Pardo River (Paranapanema River), tributary of the Paranapanema in southern São Paulo state
- Pardo River (Ribeira River), tributary of the Ribeira River in southern São Paulo and northeastern Paraná
- Pardo River (Rio Grande), tributary of the Rio Grande in northern São Paulo and southwestern Minas Gerais
- Pardo River (Rio Grande do Sul), a river of Rio Grande do Sul state in southern Brazil
- Pardo River (São Francisco River), a river of Minas Gerais state in southeastern Brazil
- Pardo River (Xingu), a river in the state of Pará, Brazil

== See also ==
- Pardo (disambiguation)
