= Abraham Pinso =

Bosnian rabbi and writer

Abraham Pinso (1740-1820) was a Bosnian rabbi and writer from Sarajevo. He served as Rosh Yeshiva and head of a Bet Din in that city, and lived in Jerusalem towards the end of his life.

== Biography ==
Pinso was born around the year 1740 in the Bosnian capital Sarajevo to Israel and Sarah. At the age of three, his father Yisrael died, and his mother died shortly afterwards. He writes about this difficult event in the introduction to his book Tola'at Shani:

"That I did not have the honor of honoring father and mother, that in my many iniquities my father was killed to the vengeance of God, and I was three years old, and when my mother died I was in the toddler season." From his words ("my father was killed", "to the vengeance of God") it is clear that his father did not die a natural death, and he may have been killed by the authorities, who often slandered the city's Jews and would have put them to death for it.

At the beginning of his studies he learned from the city's rabbis. His primary teacher was Rabbi David Pardo, who was the city's rabbi from 1773 to 1781. He married the daughter of Haim Daniel HaLevo, one of the wealthy Jews of Sarajevo, who supported him in his studies.

When Rabbi Pardo moved to Ottoman Palestine in 1781, he requested of Pinso to attempt to print his books. For this purpose Pinso travelled to Livorno, where he met Hida and the Rabbi of Ferrara Yaakov Moshe Ayash (future Rishon LeZion). The two rabbis provided him with a letter of recommendation to assist him in printing Pardo's books.

He went on to head a yeshiva in Sarajevo and taught Talmud and Halacha. At the same time, he also served as a Rabbi in the city. During this period, the city's residents were in a difficult situation from wars in the area, and the city's rabbis, Rabbi Pinso and his counterpart Rabbi Yitzchak Pardo, gathered the Jews in the synagogues to pray and even composed lamentations and supplications for the occasion.

At the end of his life (after the year 1805) Pinso immigrated to Ottoman Palestine and settled in Jerusalem. He had previously expressed his desire to make Aliyah several times in his writings and the introductions he wrote to his books. In Jerusalem he continued to write.

He died on the 18th of Cheshvan 5580 (either November 5 of 6, 1820), and was buried in the Sephardic section on the Mount of Olives, near the tomb of his teacher Rabbi David Pardo.

His son Rabbi Chaim Daniel Shlomo immigrated to Jerusalem with his father, and was known as one of the great rabbis of the city and as a leading Kabbalist. He authored the book Shem Hadash, a commentary on Rabbi Eliezer ben Samuel's Yereim. Another of Pinso's sons was Rabbi Yitzchak.

== Work ==
Penso was the author of Appe Zuṭre (Salonica, 1798), a work on the paschal laws, and of Tola'at Shani (ib. 1805), a collection of homilies. He edited Ḥayyim J. D. Azulai's notes on the Shulḥan Arukh, Mishpat Katub (ib. 1798).

=== Bibliography ===
- Api Zutri: Novellae on the laws of Passover, Thessaloniki ed., 1798
- Mishpat Katuv: Compendium collected from the Halachik works of Hida, Thessaloniki ed., 1798
- Ezrat MeTzar: Responsa on the four sections of Shulchan Aruch, first published in Jerusalem, 1994
- Tola'at Shani: Sermons, Thessaloniki ed., 1805
- Katit LaMaor: Commentary on Aggadah
