= Joseph Almanzi =

Italian bibliophile and poet (1801–1860)

- Born: 25 March 1801; Padua, Venetian Province, Habsburg monarchy
- Died: 7 March 1860 (aged 58); Trieste, Austrian Littoral, Austrian Empire
- Writing career
- Language: Hebrew

Joseph Almanzi (Hebrew: יוסף בן ברוך אלמנצי; March 25, 1801, Padua – March 7, 1860, Trieste) was an Italian Jewish bibliophile and poet.

== Biography ==
Almanzi was born in Padua, the eldest son of Baruch Hayyim Almanzi, a wealthy merchant. He received a good education by private tutors, one of whom was Israel Conian. According to the Italian custom, he began at an early age to write Hebrew poems on special occasions. At the age of twenty he was a devoted student of Jewish literature and an ardent collector of Hebrew books. Rare books and manuscripts that he could not purchase he copied. He had a good command over the Hebrew, Italian, Latin, German, and French languages, and is said also to have known Syriac.

His tastes as a bibliophile were fed by the large and well-selected library formerly belonging to Chaim Joseph David Azulai, which his father had bought from Azulai's son, Raphael Isaiah, at Ancona. This library was largely increased by Joseph Almanzi, its rare editions and manuscripts making it one of the most important in private possession. Its treasures were freely used by Luzzatto, Steinschneider, Zunz, and others. During the last few years of his life Almanzi lived at Trieste, where he took a lively interest in all communal affairs. Here he died unmarried.

== Work ==
Few of Almanzi's poems have been published. He was a graceful writer, and, above all, a clever translator into Biblical Hebrew of the poems of the great Italian authors. After his death S. D. Luzzatto published a number of his Hebrew letters and of his poems, in a collection entitled Yad Yosef ('The Hand of Joseph', Cracow and Triest, 1889).

He left a number of Hebrew poems in manuscript, among them translations from Horace. Almanzi's family published in his honour a catalogue of his Hebrew library, which was compiled by his lifelong friend Luzzatto, who also wrote a preface. Luzzatto had already described the manuscripts of the collection in the Hebräische Bibliographie of Steinschneider. The greater part of the manuscripts were bought by the British Museum; the collection of rare books found its way to the bookseller Frederik Müller in Amsterdam, and was bought in 1868 by the trustees of Temple Emanu-El in New York City, who in 1893 presented it to the library of Columbia University.

=== Publications ===
- Me'il kinah ('The Robe of Mourning'—a play on Isa. iix. 17), an elegy on Israel Conian (Reggio, 1824).
- A biography of Moses Ḥayyim Luzzatto in Kerem Ḥemed, vol. iii., reprinted by M. Wolf, Lemberg, 1879, together with Luzzatto's La-yesharim tehillah.
- Higgayon be-kinnor ('A Reverie upon the Harp'), a collection of poems on Judah di Modena and Isaac Abravanel and of translations from Savioli, Tasso, Phædrus, Petrarch, and Vitorelli, among others. (Vienna, 1839).
- An elegy on the death of Jacob Vita Pardo, printed together with S. D. Luzzatto's Avne zikkaron (Prague, 1841; the copy of the inscriptions published by Luzzatto was made by Almanzi).
- Nezem zahav ('A Golden Ring'), Hebrew poetry (Padua, 1858).
