= José Pardo =

José Pardo may refer to:

- José Pardo y Barreda (1864–1947), Peruvian politician, twice president of Peru
- José Antonio Pardo (born 1988), Spanish footballer
- José González Pardo (born 1939), Chilean footballer and manager
- Sport José Pardo, a Peruvian football club in Tumán, Lambayeque

== See also ==
- Joseph Pardo (disambiguation)
