= David Pardo (Dutch rabbi, born in Salonica) =

17th century Dutch Rabbi born in Solonica

Rabbi David Pardo

Personal life
- Born: c. 1591 Salonica
- Died: March 15, 1657 Amsterdam
- Buried: Beth Haim Cemetery, Ouderkerk aan de Amstel, Amsterdam
- Spouse: Rachel Sanchez
- Children: Joseph Pardo; Josiah Pardo; Sarah Pardo (married Joseph Salom)
- Parent(s): Joseph Pardo; Reina

Religious life
- Religion: Judaism

David ben Joseph Pardo (c. 1591 – 1657) was a Dutch rabbi and hakham. He was born in Salonica to Rabbi Joseph and Reina in the second half of the sixteenth century. He went with his father to Amsterdam, where he became hakham of the Bet Yisrael congregation (founded 1618). This congregation was consolidated in 1639 with the other two congregations in Amsterdam, and Pardo was appointed hakham together with Isaac Aboab da Fonseca, Menasseh Ben Israel, and Saul Levi Morteira. He was also a trustee of the Jewish cemetery and hazzan of the Bikkur Holim organization. In 1625 he founded the Honen Dallim benevolent society.

In 1610, Pardo published in Amsterdam a transcription in Latin characters of Zaddik ben Joseph Formon's Obligacion de los Coraçones, a translation of the Hobot ha-Lebabot into Judaeo-Spanish.

On September 16, 1619, he married Rachel Sanchez (born 1595 at Moura, Portugal). They had three children: Joseph (c. 1624 – 1677), Josiah (1626-1684), and Sarah. Josiah Pardo served as a Rabbi in Curaçao and in Port Royal, Jamaica and was one of the first Rabbis in the New World.

Pardo died at Amsterdam on March 15, 1657 (Rosh Chodesh Nisan, 5417 A.M.) and is buried at Beth Haim of Ouderkerk aan de Amstel.
