= Isaac Pardo =

Isaac ben David Pardo (Hebrew: יצחק בן דוד פארדו) was a Bosnian rabbi as well as the author of "To'afot Re'em", a commentary on the responsa of Rabbi Ahai of Shabha, with an index of the different responsa. He succeeded his father, Rabbi David Pardo, as rabbi of Sarajevo, Bosnia and Herzegovina. His brother was Jacob Pardo.

"To'afot Re'em" was published posthumously at Thessaloniki in 1811.
