= Pardos, Guadalajara =

Pardos
- Municipality
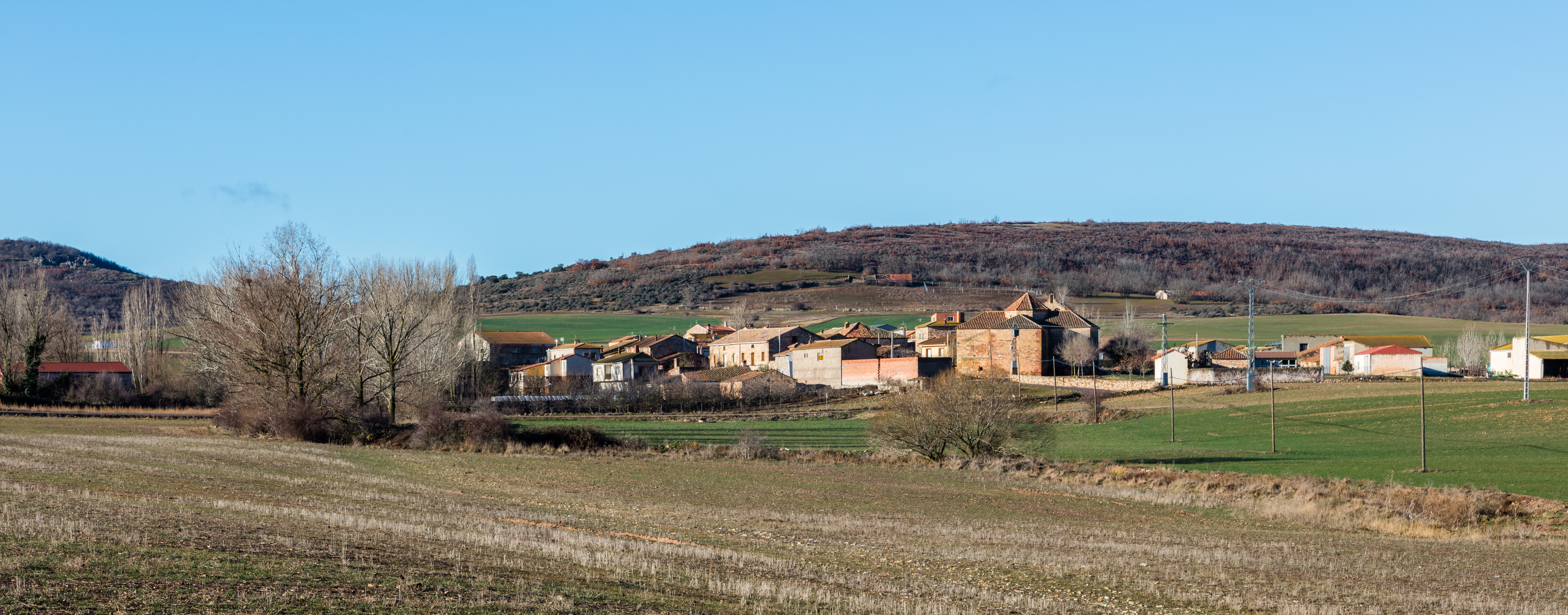

- Location in Spain
- Coordinates: 40°56′56″N 1°55′27″W
- Country: Spain
- Autonomous community: Castile-La Mancha
- Province: Guadalajara
- Comarca: Señorío de Molina-Alto Tajo

Government
  - Alcalde: Alfonso Martínez Ibáñez

Area
  - Total: 23 km^{2} (8.9 sq mi)

Population (2025-01-01)
  - Total: 33
  - Density: 1.4/km^{2} (3.7/sq mi)
- Time zone: UTC+1 (CET)
  - Summer (DST): UTC+2 (CEST)
- Postal code: 19490

Pardos is a municipality in the province of Guadalajara, Castile-La Mancha, Spain. The municipality had 23.15 km^{2} and a population of 50 inhabitants at the time of the 2013 census (INE).
