= David Pardo (Dutch rabbi, born in Amsterdam) =

David ben Joseph Pardo was a 17th-century rabbi. He was born in Amsterdam. His father was Rabbi Joseph Pardo (c. 1624 – 1677), hazzan in London and author of "Shulḥan Tahor."

== Personal life ==
He was married to Esther Abenatar.

== Works ==
He edited his father's work "Shulḥan Tahor" and also translated the work into Spanish under the title of "Compendio de Dinim" (Amsterdam, 1689). The other works attributed to him by Julius Fürst ("Bibliotheca Judaica" iii. 67) were written by David ben Jacob Pardo.
