= Jacob Pardo =

Rabbi

Jacob ben David Pardo was an 18th-century rabbi, author and poet.

He served as rabbi at Ragusa (Dubrovnik) and Spalato (Split). He was the author of: "Marpe Lashon" (Venice, 1780), prayers and religious poems for children, printed conjointly with his "Tehillah be-Eretz," poems on the earthquake in Ragusa; "Kehillat Ya'akob" (ib. 1784), commentary on the Earlier Prophets; "Appe Zutre" (ib. 1797), novellæ to the treatise "Hilkot Ishshut," i.e., precepts for women; "Tokfo shel Nes" (ib. 1798), introduction to the "Ma'aseh Nissim" of Aaron Cohen Ragusano; "Minchat Aharon" (ib. 1809), precepts for the religious ritual upon awakening, for the three daily prayers, and moral precepts; "Mishkenot Ya'akob" (Leghorn, 1824), commentary on Isaiah, published by his son David Samuel.
