= Moses Pardo =

Rabbi and rabbinical emissary

Rabbi Moses ben Raphael Pardo

Personal life
- Born: Unknown Jerusalem
- Died: 1888 Alexandria, Egypt
- Notable work(s): Hora'ah de-Veit Din, Shemo Moshe, Zedek u-Mishpat
- Known for: Author of Hora'ah de-Veit Din, Shemo Moshe, Zedek u-Mishpat
- Occupation: Rabbi, Rabbinical Emissary

Religious life
- Religion: Judaism

Senior posting
- Post: Rabbi of Alexandria

Moses ben Raphael Pardo (died 1888) was a rabbi and rabbinical emissary. He was born in Jerusalem. After serving as rabbi in Jerusalem for many years, he left the city in 1870 and traveled to North Africa on a mission on behalf of Jerusalem. On his return trip in 1871 he stopped in Alexandria and accepted an offer to serve as the rabbi of the Jewish community there, a position he held until his death. Pardo was the author of Hora'ah de-Veit Din, about the laws of divorce; Shemo Moshe, responsa; and Zedek u-Mishpat, novellae to Hoshen Mishpat.

He was a descendant of Rabbi Chaim Yosef David Azulai.
