= Jacob Vita Pardo =

Author and preacher

Jacob Vita Pardo (Hebrew: יעקב חי פארדו; 1817–1838) was an author and preacher. He was born at Ragusa in 1817 to David Samuel Pardo, and died in 1838 at Padua, where he studied at the Collegium Rabbinicum under Samuel David Luzzatto. His body was transported to Verona for burial. Five of his sermons, preached in Padua and Verona, were published after his death. When but eighteen years old he wrote a commentary on Micah, which was published by Luzzatto as the first supplement to Joseph Almanzi's "Abne Zikkaron," Prague, 1841. The commentary is not complete, extending only to chapter 4 verse 8. An obituary, written by Luzzatto in memory of his talented pupil, serves as an introduction to the work.
