= Elijah Montalto =

Portuguese-French Jewish physician (1567-1616)

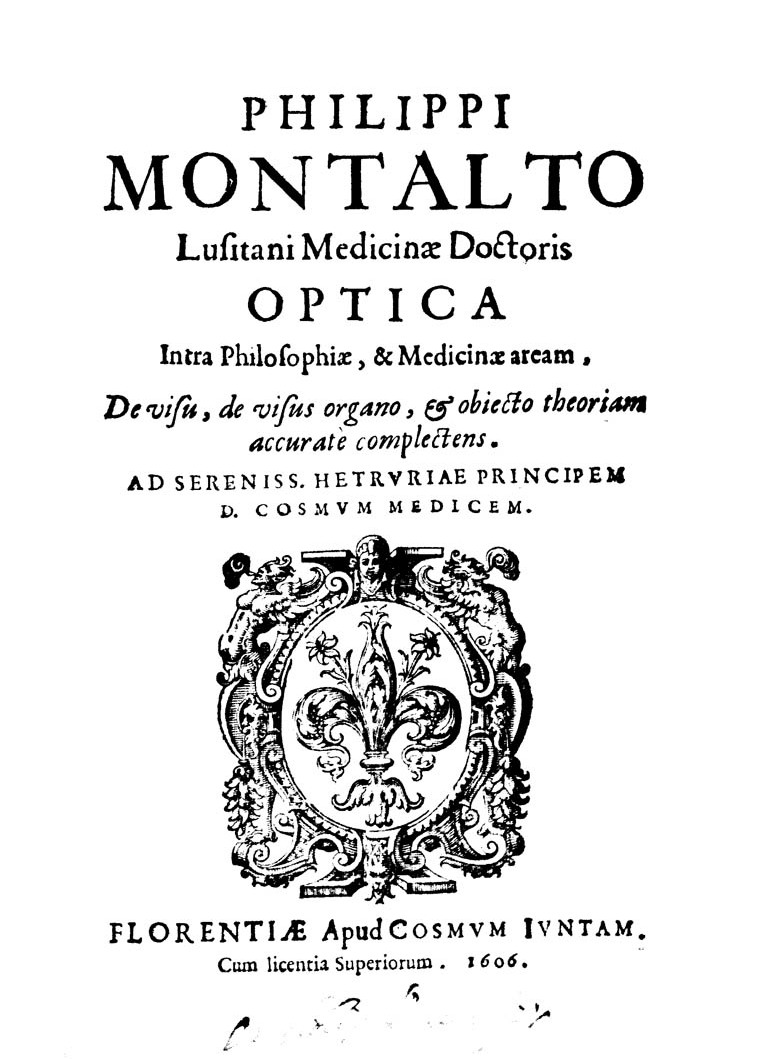
Optica intra philosophiae, 1606

Elijah Montalto (1567 – 1616) was a Marrano physician and polemicist from Paris who became the personal physician of Maria de Medici.

He had been reared as a Christian in Portugal and openly returned to Judaism on settling in Venice. His Suitable and Incontrovertible Propositions was an anti-Christian polemic. He was one of the teachers of Joseph Solomon Delmedigo.

When Montalto died, Saul Levi Morteira went to Paris to recover his body for burial in Beth Haim of Ouderkerk aan de Amstel, one of the Jewish cemeteries in Amsterdam.

== Works ==
- Optica intra philosophiae, et medicinae aream, de visu, de visus organo, et obiecto theoriam accurate complectens (in Latin). Firenze: Cosimo Giunta. 1606.
