= Treaty of El Pardo =

The Treaty of El Pardo may refer to:

- Treaty of El Pardo (1728)
- Treaty of El Pardo (1739), commonly referred to as the Convention of Pardo
- Treaty of El Pardo (1761)
- Treaty of El Pardo (1778)
