= Joseph Pardo (hazzan) =

English hazzan

Hazzan Joseph Pardo
- Born: c. 1624
- Died: August 1677 (aged 52–53); Amsterdam
- Resting place: Beth Haim of Ouderkerk aan de Amstel
- Children: Rachel, David
- Father: David Pardo

Joseph Pardo (c. 1624 – 1677) was an English hazzan. He appears to have gone to London from Amsterdam, where his father, David, was a rabbi. He wrote "Shulhan Tahor," a compendium of the first two parts of Joseph Caro's Shulhan 'Aruk, which was edited by his son, David, and printed at Amsterdam in 1686, dedicated to the "Kaal Kados De Londres" (Holy Community of London), but with an approbation from the bet din of Amsterdam. The book has been reprinted several times: Frankfort-on-the-Main, 1696, and, with notes by Moses Isserles, 1713; and Frankfort-on-the-Oder, 1704.

Hazzan Pardo was married and had two children: Rachel (married Isaac, son of Emanuel Baruch) and the above-mentioned Rabbi David (married Esther Abenatar).

Hazzan Pardo died in August, 1677, at Amsterdam and was buried in the same grave as his grandfather, Rabbi Joseph Pardo, at Beth Haim of Ouderkerk aan de Amstel.
