= Saul Levi Morteira =

Important rabbi in 17th c. Amsterdam

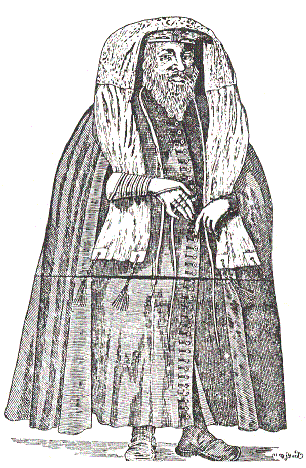
- Illustration of Morteira, 1912

Personal life
- Born: c. 1596 Venice, Republic of Venice
- Died: 10 February 1660 (aged 63–64) Amsterdam, Netherlands

Religious life
- Religion: Judaism

Saul Levi Morteira or Mortera (c. 1596 – 10 February 1660) was a rabbi in Amsterdam. He was born in Venice, so he was neither a Sephardic or Ashkenazic Jew. He became a prominent figure in the city's community of exiled Portuguese Jews. His polemical writings against Catholicism had wide circulation.

== Life ==
Morteira was a student of prominent Italian rabbi Leon de Modena. In a Spanish poem Daniel Levi de Barrios speaks of him as being a native of Germany ("de Alemania natural"). From the age of thirteen, Morteira accompanied Elijah Montalto to Paris and served as his secretary at the Louvre until 1616. When Montalto died, Morteira escorted the body of the physician from France to Amsterdam, where a Jewish community had been openly established and he could have a Jewish burial. In Amsterdam he married a poor Jewish orphan, whose dowry was provided by a Jewish charity for poor women. This marital pattern was typical for rabbis in Amsterdam at the time. Rabbis were not desirable candidates for marriage into rich Sephardi families. The fact that Morteira was from Venice and not a Sephardi Jew might have also been a factor, despite his eminence as a rabbi.

The Sephardic Congregation Beth Jaacob ("House of Jacob") in Amsterdam elected him hakham in succession to Moses ben Aroyo. Morteira was the founder of the congregational school Keter Torah, in the highest class of which he taught Talmud and Jewish philosophy. He was the senior rabbi when the three Amsterdam congregations merged in 1639, outranking Menasseh Ben Israel, and receiving an annual remuneration of 600 guilders. The two rabbis had strong differences of opinion. Morteira was fiercely anti-Christian, while Ben Israel sought to bridge the religious divide between Jews and Christians, particularly dissenting Protestants. Their feuding prompted the intervention of the Ma'amad, the political arm of the community, to prevent the rabbis' disputes from becoming open and a source of instability in the congregation. Among his most notable pupils were Moses Zacuto, Abraham Cohen Pimentel, and Baruch Spinoza.

Morteira was concerned about members of the congregation violating Jewish law and questioning rabbinic authority. He instigated an investigation against physician Daniel de Prado (also known as Dr. Juan de Prado, born in Andalusia c. 1614), who held deist beliefs, and Daniel de Ribeira, a Catalan convert to Judaism, then apostate from it. Both "held a deprecatory and cynical view of the Law of Moses", doubted the divine nature of Scripture, and argued against the immortality of the soul. Their views influenced Spinoza. Morteira and Isaac da Fonseca Aboab (Manasseh ben Israel was at that time in England) were members of the Ma'amad which on 27 July 1656 pronounced the decree of cherem (excommunication) against Spinoza.

== Works ==
Some of Morteira's pupils published Gibeat Shaul (Amsterdam, 1645), a collection of fifty sermons on the Pentateuch, selected from 500 derashot written by Morteira.

Morteira wrote in Spanish Tractado de la Verdad de la Ley (translated into Hebrew by Isaac Gomez de Gosa under the title Torat Moshe, in 66 chapters), apologetics of Judaism and attacks against Christianity. This work (excerpts from which are given in Jacques Basnage, Histoire de la Religion des Juifs) and other writings of Morteira, on immortality, revelation, etc., are still in manuscript.

Morteira's polemical sermons in Hebrew against the Catholic Church were published, but his Portuguese writings against Calvinism remained unpublished.
