= Ouderkerk aan de Amstel =

- Town
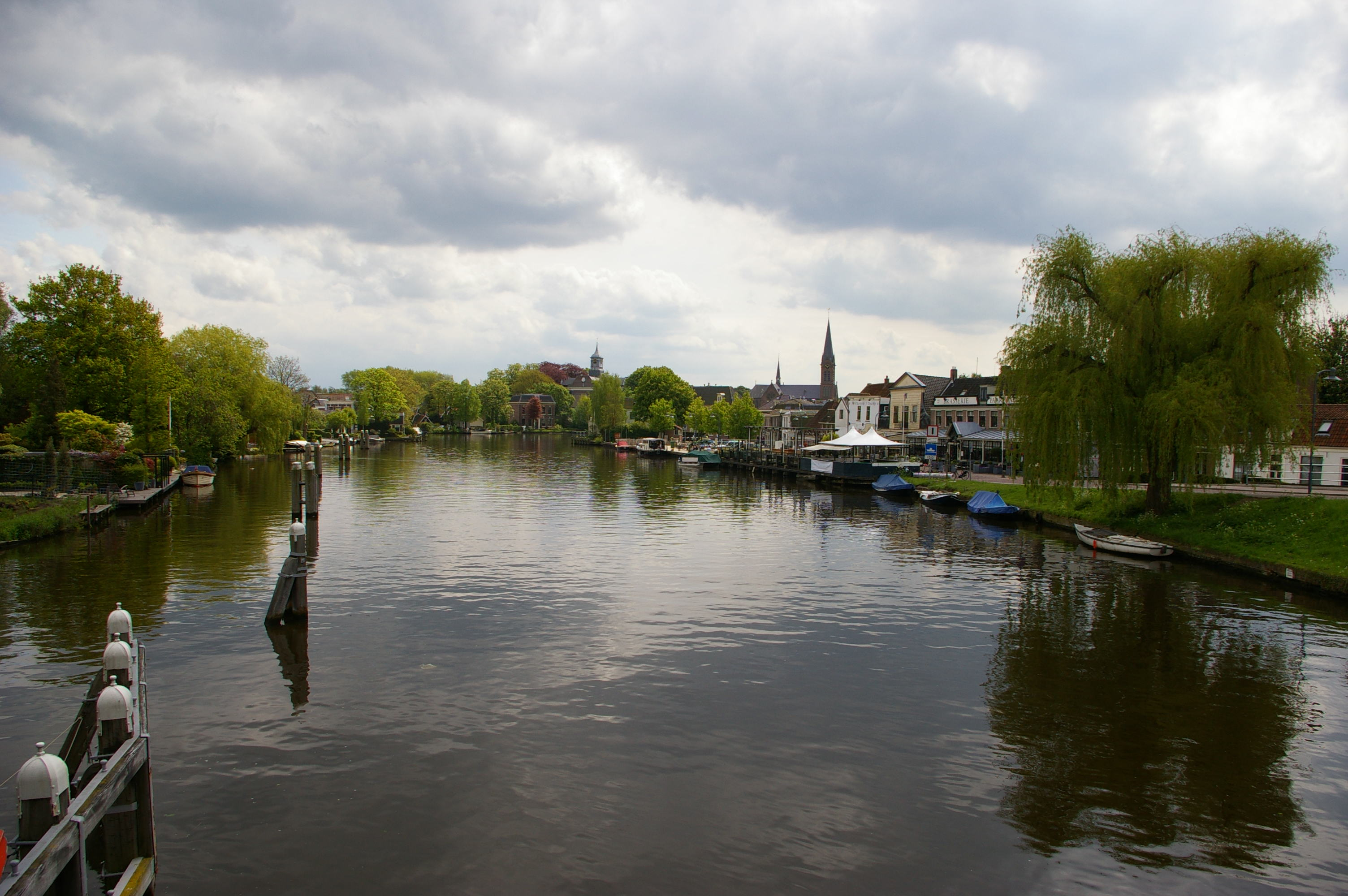
- Ouderkerk aan de Amstel seen from the Amstel

- Location in the Netherlands Location in the province of North Holland in the Netherlands
- Coordinates: 52°17′49″N 4°54′15″E
- Country: Netherlands
- Province: North Holland
- Municipality: Ouder-Amstel; Amstelveen

Area
  - Total: 2.21 km^{2} (0.85 sq mi)
- Elevation: −0.9 m (−3.0 ft)

Population (2026)
  - Total: 8.809
  - Density: 3.99/km^{2} (10.3/sq mi)
- Time zone: UTC+1 (CET)
  - Summer (DST): UTC+2 (CEST)
- Postal code: 1191
- Dialing code: 020

Ouderkerk aan de Amstel (Dutch pronunciation: [ˈʌudərkɛr(ə)k aːn də ˈʔɑmstəl]) is a town in the province of North Holland, Netherlands. It is largely a part of the municipality of Ouder-Amstel; it lies about 9 km south of Amsterdam. A small part of the town lies in the municipality of Amstelveen. It is connected to Amsterdam by the river Amstel. There is another village called Ouderkerk in South Holland, Ouderkerk aan den IJssel.

== History ==
The village was first mentioned in 1308 as Ouderkerken, and means "old church". Old was probably added to distinguish from another village, however it is not clear which village. A candidate is Nieuwerkerk which disappeared in the Haarlemmermeer, but it can also refer to Amstelveen. It most likely refers to Amstelveen since Amstelveen used to be called Nieuwer-Amstel.

Ouderkerk developed at the confluence of the Bullewijk into the Amstel river. The castle of the van Amstel family was probably located on across the present church, however it was destroyed in 1204. From the 17th century onwards, estates were built in Ouderkerk aan de Amstel by the Amsterdam merchants.

== Main sights ==
The town is the site of the Beth Haim of Ouderkerk aan de Amstel, the oldest Jewish cemetery in the Netherlands, as well as a neogothic Roman Catholic church that was designed by Pierre Cuypers in 1865. The Dutch landscape painter Jacob van Ruisdael created at least two renderings of the cemetery and a church, after his imagination.

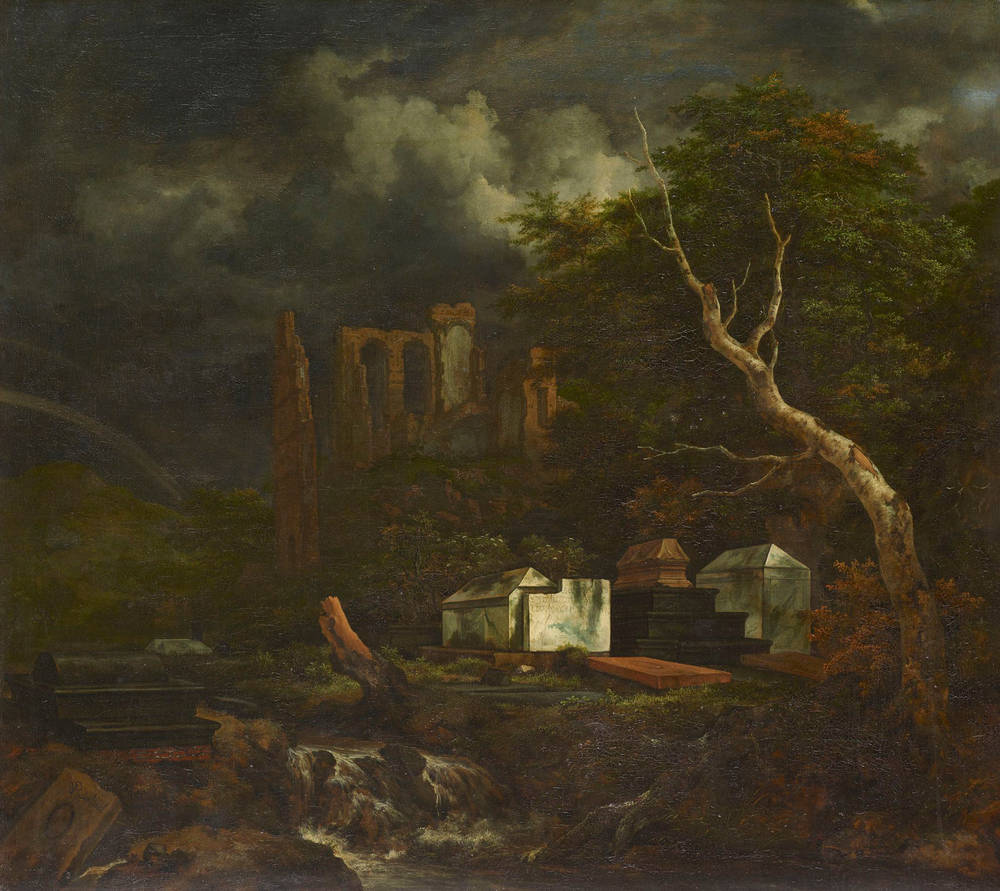
Jacob van Ruisdael, The Jewish Cemetery, 1653/54 (Dresden)

== Gallery ==
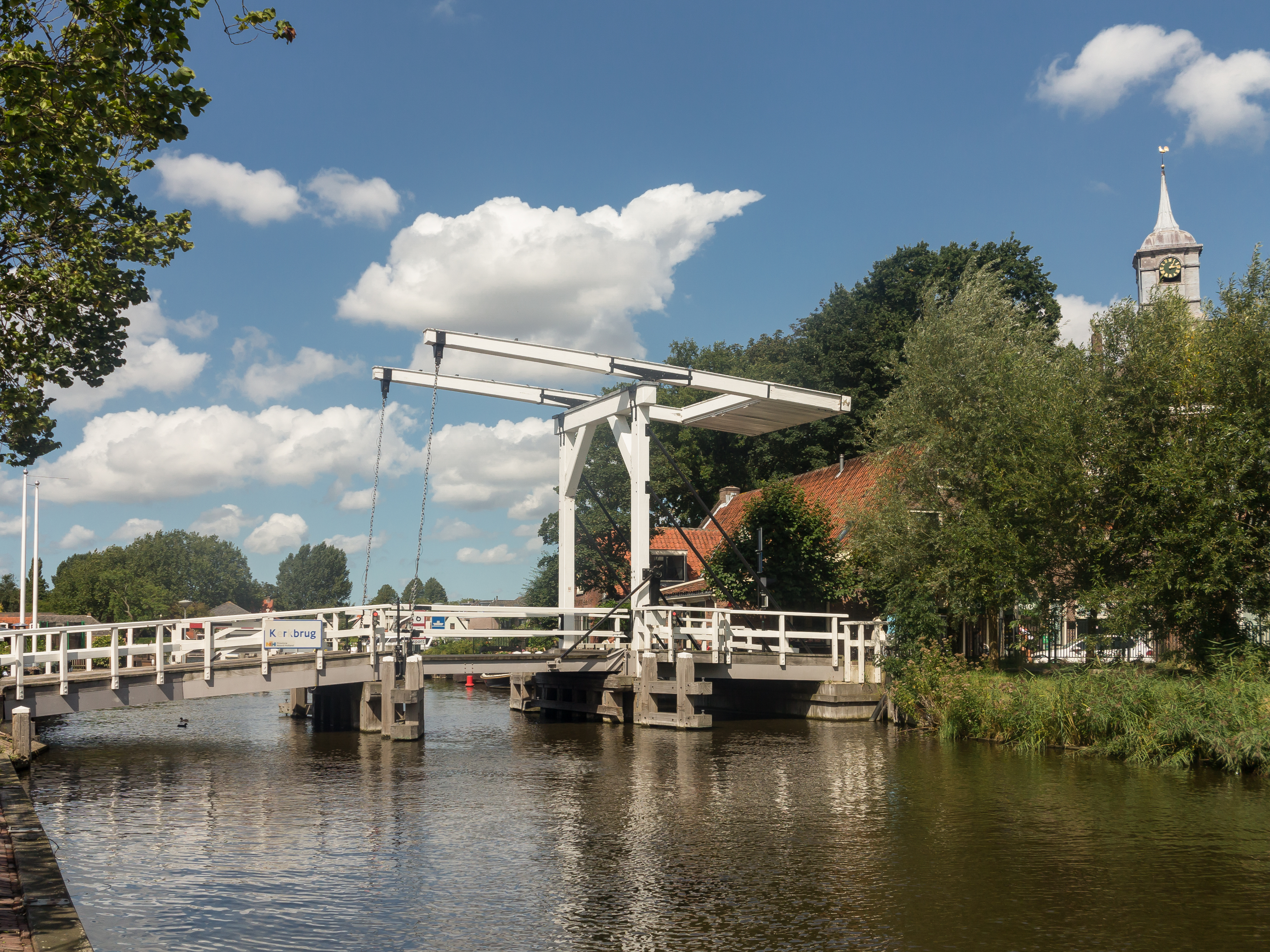
Drawing bridge: de Kerkbrug

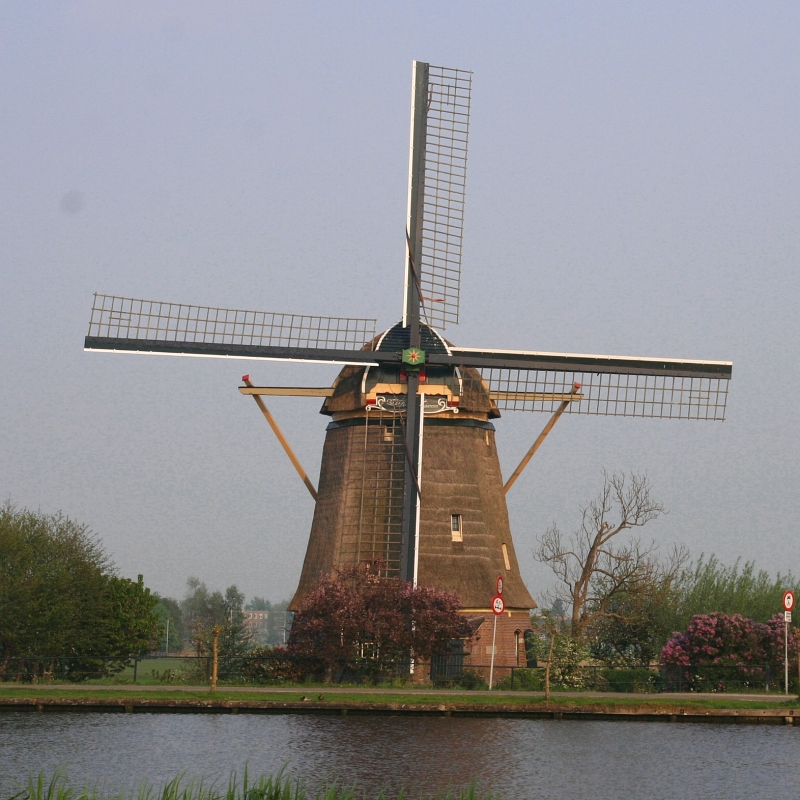
De Zwaan ("The Swan") windmill

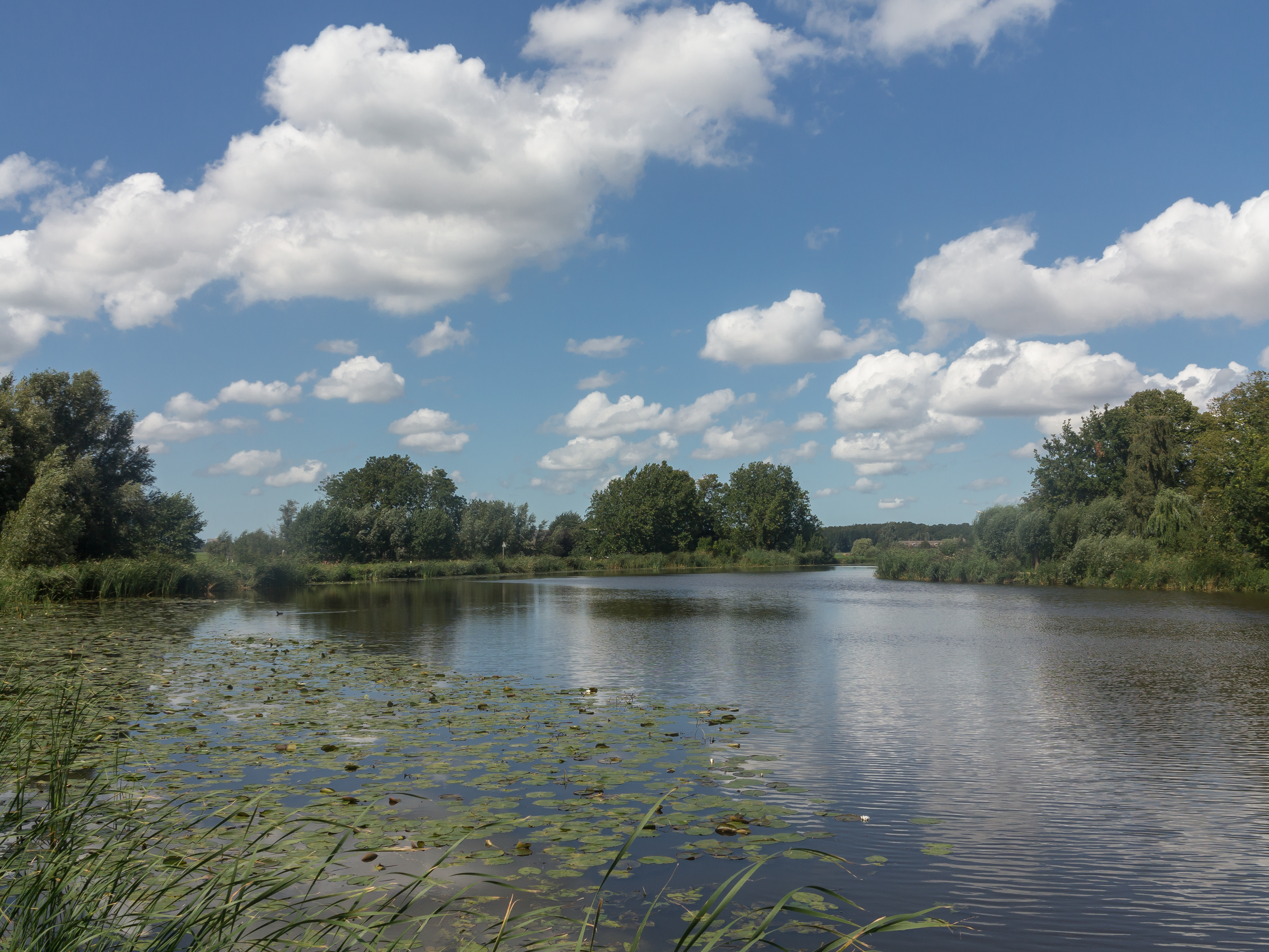
View to de Ronde Hoep

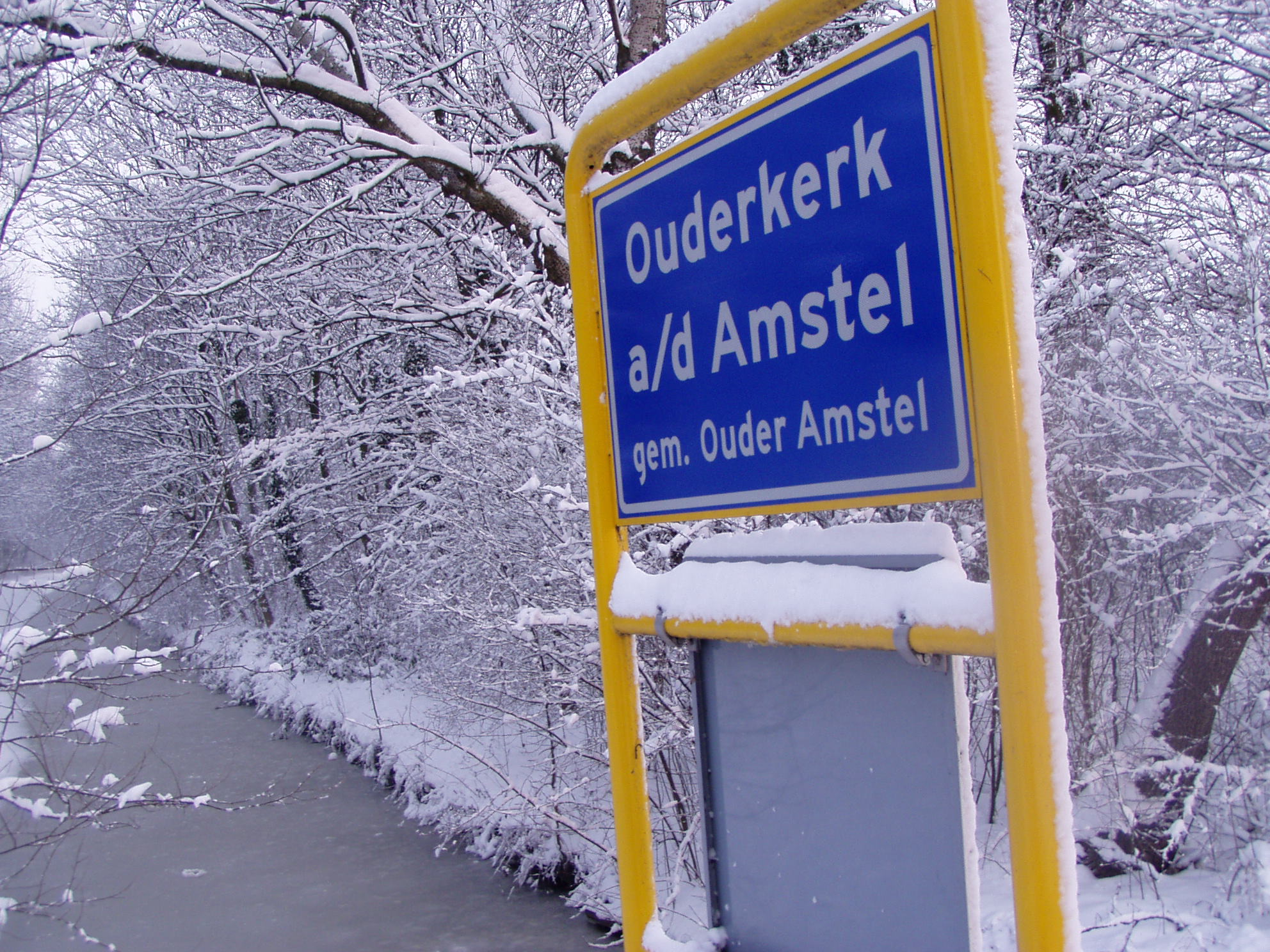
Entering the town of Ouderkerk aan de Amstel

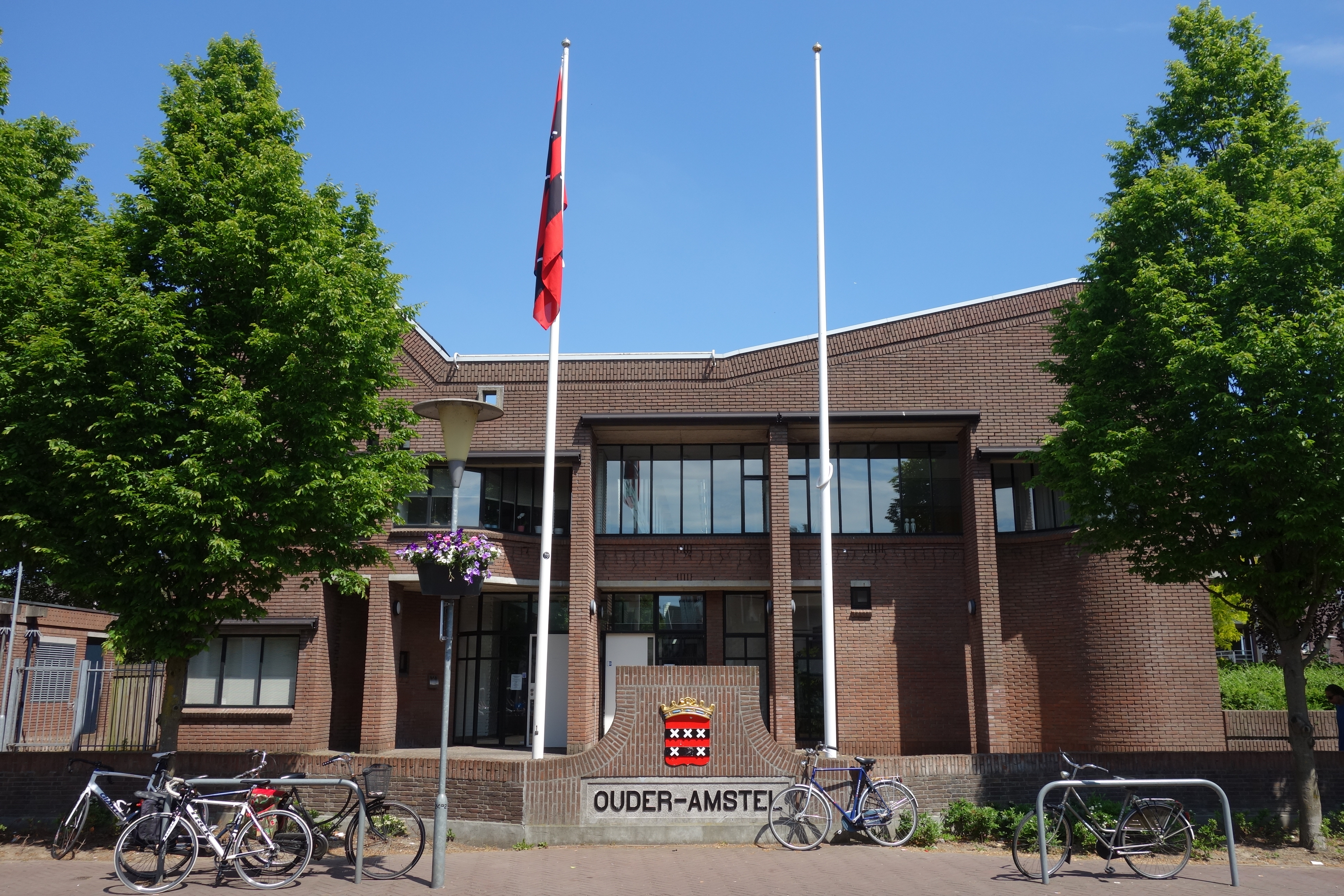
Ouder-Amstel Town Hall in Ouderkerk aan de Amstel

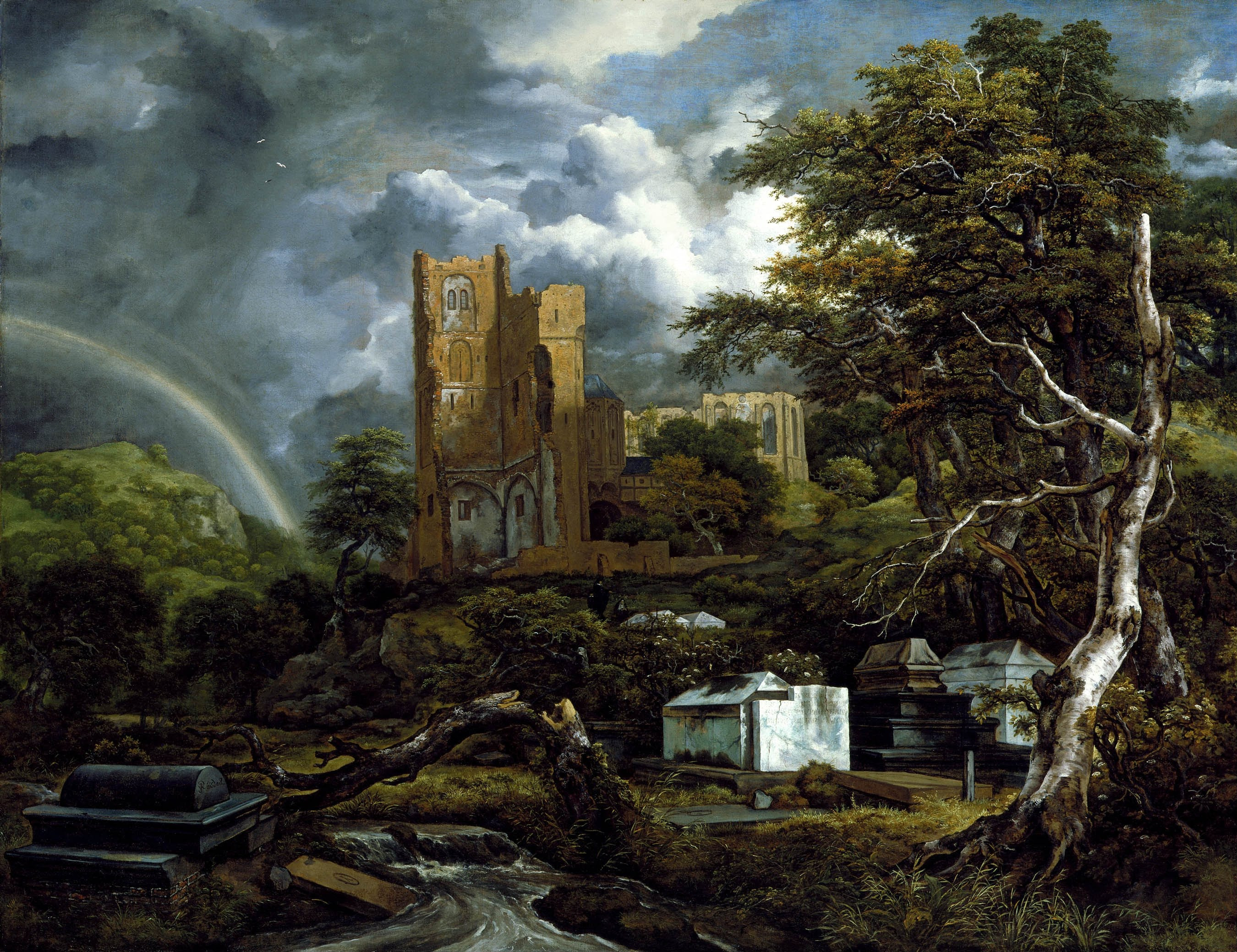
Jacob van Ruisdael, The Jewish Cemetery (Detroit Institute of Arts)
