= Joseph Pardo (rabbi) =

Italian rabbi and merchant

Rabbi Joseph Pardo

Personal life
- Born: c. 1561 Thessaloniki
- Died: 9 October 1619 Amsterdam
- Buried: Beth Haim of Ouderkerk aan de Amstel
- Spouse: Reina
- Children: Isaac, Abraham, David

Religious life
- Religion: Judaism

Jewish leader
- Synagogue: Bet Ya'akob congregation, Amsterdam
- Began: 1597
- Ended: 1619
- Yahrtzeit: Rosh Chodesh Cheshvan, 5380 A.M.

Joseph Pardo (born c. 1561 – died 9 October 1619) was an Italian rabbi and merchant. He was born in Thessaloniki, but went to Venice before 1589, where he served as rabbi to the Levantine community and also engaged in business. Later, he emigrated to the Netherlands and was appointed Hakham of the Bet Ya'akob congregation in Amsterdam founded by Jacob Tirado, holding office from 1597 until his death.

In 1615 he founded the Hermandad de las Huerfanas and Moher ha-Betulot, now the Santa Compania de Dotar Orphas e Donzelas. Some liturgical poems by him are included in the "Imre Noam" (Amsterdam, 1628; very rare). He was married to Reina (died at Amsterdam, 1631) and had three sons: Their eldest son, Isaac Pardo, died at Uskup in Turkey. Their second son, Abraham Pardo, died in Jerusalem.

Their third son, David (c. 1591 – 1657), died at Amsterdam. David's son, Joseph Pardo, was an English hazzan (died 1677).

Pardo died in Amsterdam on Wednesday, 9 October 1619 (Rosh Chodesh Cheshvan, 5380 A.M.) and is buried at Beth Haim of Ouderkerk aan de Amstel.
