= David Pardo (Italian rabbi) =

Personal life
- Born: 29 March 1719 Venice, Republic of Venice
- Died: 1792 Jerusalem, Ottoman Empire
- Children: Isaac Pardo
- Parent: Jacob Pardo (father)

Religious life
- Religion: Judaism

David Pardo was an 18th-century Italian rabbi and liturgical poet who lived for some time in Sarajevo and in Jerusalem. Among other things, he authored a commentary on the Sifra on Leviticus and Maskil le-David (Venice, 1760), a super-commentary on Rashi on the Torah.

== Biography ==
Pardo was born in Venice on 29 March 1719 and died in Jerusalem in 1792. He was the son of Jacob Pardo of Ragusa, rabbi of Venice. After finishing his studies, Pardo left Venice and went to Ragusa. He then lived for some years in Sarajevo, where he devoted himself to teaching. From Sarajevo he went to Split, Dalmatia, where Rabbi Abraham David Papo engaged him as teacher at the yeshivah. After the death of Papo's successor, Isaac Tzedakah, Pardo was elected chief rabbi of the city. Among his disciples were Shabbethai Ventura, David Pinto, and Abraham Curiel.

In 1764 Pardo accepted the position of chief rabbi at Sarajevo, where he succeeded Joshua Isaac Machoro. He employed his leisure time in writing and publishing various works. Toward the end of his life he went to Jerusalem, where he died.

Pardo married a young woman of Split, who aided him in literary labors. They had three sons, named Jacob, Isaac, and Abraham, and one daughter. The last-named married Abraham Penso, author of the Appe Zutre (Salonica, 1798). Abraham Pardo married a daughter of the great Rabbi Hayyim Joseph David Azulai. Isaac succeeded him as rabbi of Sarajevo.

== Works ==
In 1752 Pardo began to publish, his first work being Shoshannim le-David (Venice, 1752), a commentary on the Mishnah. He also wrote the following works:

- Miktam le-David (Salonica, 1769), responsa
- Chasdei David (part i., Leghorn, 1776; part ii., ib. 1790), commentary on the Tosefta
- Chukkat ha-Pesach (Leghorn, 1796), a ritual for the Passover season
- La-Menatzeach le-David (Salonica, 1795), novellae on various Talmudic topics.

His liturgical works include:

- Sekiyyot ha-Chemdah (Salonica, 1756; often reprinted), ritual for the first day of Nisan
- Shirah Chadashah (Amsterdam, 1776 [?]), the history of Esther in verse
- Mizmor le-David (Leghorn, 1818), notes on Shulchan 'Aruk, Yoreh De'ah; Shif'at Rebibim (Leghorn, 1788, and often reprinted), prayers for holy days, with a poetical presentation of the Temple service on Yom Kippur and other piyyutim, published by his disciple Elisha Chabillo, called also "Mercado."

Notes of Pardo's on the Talmud are found in the Vienna edition of 1860–72, and on Alfasi in the Vilna Edition Shas of 1881–86. As of 1906, the library of the Jewish community at Rustchuk owned a Miktam le-David bearing the author's signature.
