= List of South-East European Jews =

Many of the Jews expelled from the Iberian Peninsula during the Spanish Inquisition settled in the Ottoman Empire, leaving behind, at the wake of Empire, large Sephardic communities in South-East Europe: mainly in Bulgaria, Turkey, Greece, Bosnia and Herzegovina and Serbia.

== Bosnia and Herzegovina ==
- Kalmi Baruh, writer and philosopher
- Emerik Blum, businessman, founder of Energoinvest, former Mayor of Sarajevo
- Ivan Ceresnjes, architect-researcher, former president of the Jewish community in Bosnia and Herzegovina and vice-chairman of the Yugoslav Federation of Jewish Communities, 1992–1996
- Oskar Danon, composer and conductor
- David Elazar, Israeli general and Chief of Staff of Israel Defense Forces
- Jakob Finci, politician, ambassador of Bosnia and Herzegovina to Switzerland
- Daniel Kabiljo, painter
- Daniel Ozmo, painter
- Isaac Pardo, rabbi of Sarajevo
- Robert Rothbart, basketball player
- Isak Samokovlija, writer

== Bulgaria ==
- Albert Aftalion, Bulgarian-born French economist
- Binyamin Arditi
- Aron Aronov, tenor
- Mira Aroyo, member of the band Ladytron
- Gabi Ashkenazi
- Michael Bar-Zohar
- Maxim Behar, president of M3 Communications Group
- Haim Bejarano, Torah scholar and chief rabbi
- Shimon Bejarano
- Alexander Bozhkov, vice-premier (Jewish mother)
- Elias Canetti, author and Nobel Prize winner
- Sabetay Djaen, rabbi and teacher
- Carl Djerassi
- Itzhak Fintzi, dramatist
- Pini Gershon
- Moshe Gueron
- Shlomo Kalo
- Nikolay Kaufman, musicologist and composer
- Yehezkel Lazarov
- Moshe Leon
- Milcho Leviev, jazz composer (Jewish father)
- Raphael Mechoulam
- Moni Moshonov
- Ya'akov Nehushtan
- Ya'akov Nitzani
- Jules Pascin, artist (Jewish father)
- Isaac Passy, philosopher
- Solomon Passy, foreign minister, son of Isaac Passy
- Valeri Petrov
- Georgi Pirinski, Jr.
- David Primo
- Sarah-Theodora
- Victor Shem-Tov
- Maxim Staviski
- Angel Wagenstein, author & screenwriter
- Alexis Weissenberg, pianist
- Jaime Yankelevich
- Emanuel Zisman

== Croatia ==
- Viktor Axmann, architect
- Slavko Brill, sculptor and ceramics artist
- Julio Deutsch, architect
- Hugo Ehrlich, architect
- Ignjat Fischer, architect
- Josip Frank, Croatian politician
- Stjepan Gomboš, architect
- Branko Grünbaum, mathematician
- Leo Hönigsberg, architect
- Rikard Lang, prominent Croatian university professor, lawyer and economist, UN's expert
- Slobodan Lang, physician, politician, humanitarian
- Slavko Löwy, architect
- Rudolf Lubinski, architect
- Branko Lustig, film producer and winner of two Academy Awards
- Blessed Ivan Merz, beatified in 2003
- Oscar Nemon, sculptor
- Vladimir Šterk, architect
- Ivo Stern, founder of the "Zagreb Radiostation"
- Karlo Weissmann, physician and founder of the first sanatorium in Osijek
- Dragutin Wolf, industrialist, founder of the food company Koestlin in Bjelovar

== Cyprus ==
- Aristobulus of Britannia (converted to Christianity)
- Barnabas (mentioned in the New Testament)
- Mike Brant, French-based singer (Cyprus-born)
- Epiphanius of Salamis (converted to Christianity)
  - John the Merciful
- Arie Zeev Raskin, rabbi
- Georgios Savva, footballer

== Greece ==
- Albert Bourla, Pfizer CEO
- Hank Azaria, actor and producer
- Sid Ganis, film producer
- Anna Rezan, actress and singer
- Moses Elisaf, physician and academic
- Alberto Israel Errera, officer
- Leon Cohen, Holocaust survivor
- Marcel Nadjari, Holocaust survivor
- Salamo Arouch, boxer and Holocaust survivor
- Avraam Benaroya, socialist
- Ioanna Tsatsou, writer

== Montenegro ==
- Jelena Đurović, writer, politician and journalist

== North Macedonia ==
- Estreya Haim Ovadya, Yugoslav partisan
- Rafael Moshe Kamhi
- Žamila Kolonomos, Sephardi Jewish partisan, writer, academic, and political activist

== Serbia ==
- David Albahari, writer
- David Albala, military officer, physician, diplomat, and Jewish community leader
- Oskar Danon, composer
- Oskar Davičo, poet
- Filip David, playwright and columnist
- Predrag Ejdus, actor
- Vanja Ejdus, actress
- Rahela Ferari, actress
- Ivan Ivanji, writer
- Enriko Josif, composer
- Danilo Kiš, writer
- Marko Kon, pop singer
- Shaul Ladany, Holocaust survivor, racewalker and two-time Olympian
- Tommy Lapid, former Israeli politician of Hungarian descent, born in Novi Sad
- Paulina Lebl-Albala, feminist, translator, literary critic, literature theoretician, and professor of literature in Belgrade
- Sonja Licht, political activist
- Izidor Papo, cardiac surgeon, general-colonel of the Yugoslav Army medical unit
- Moša Pijade, politician, painter, art critic and publicist
- Eva Ras, actress
- Seka Sablić, actress
- Erich Šlomović, art collector
- Aleksandar Tišma, writer

== Slovenia ==
- Katja Boh, politician
- Berta Bojetu, author
- Israel Isserlin, Medieval rabbi
- Lev Kreft, sociologist and politician
- Dušan Šarotar, author and editor

== Turkey ==
=== Academia ===
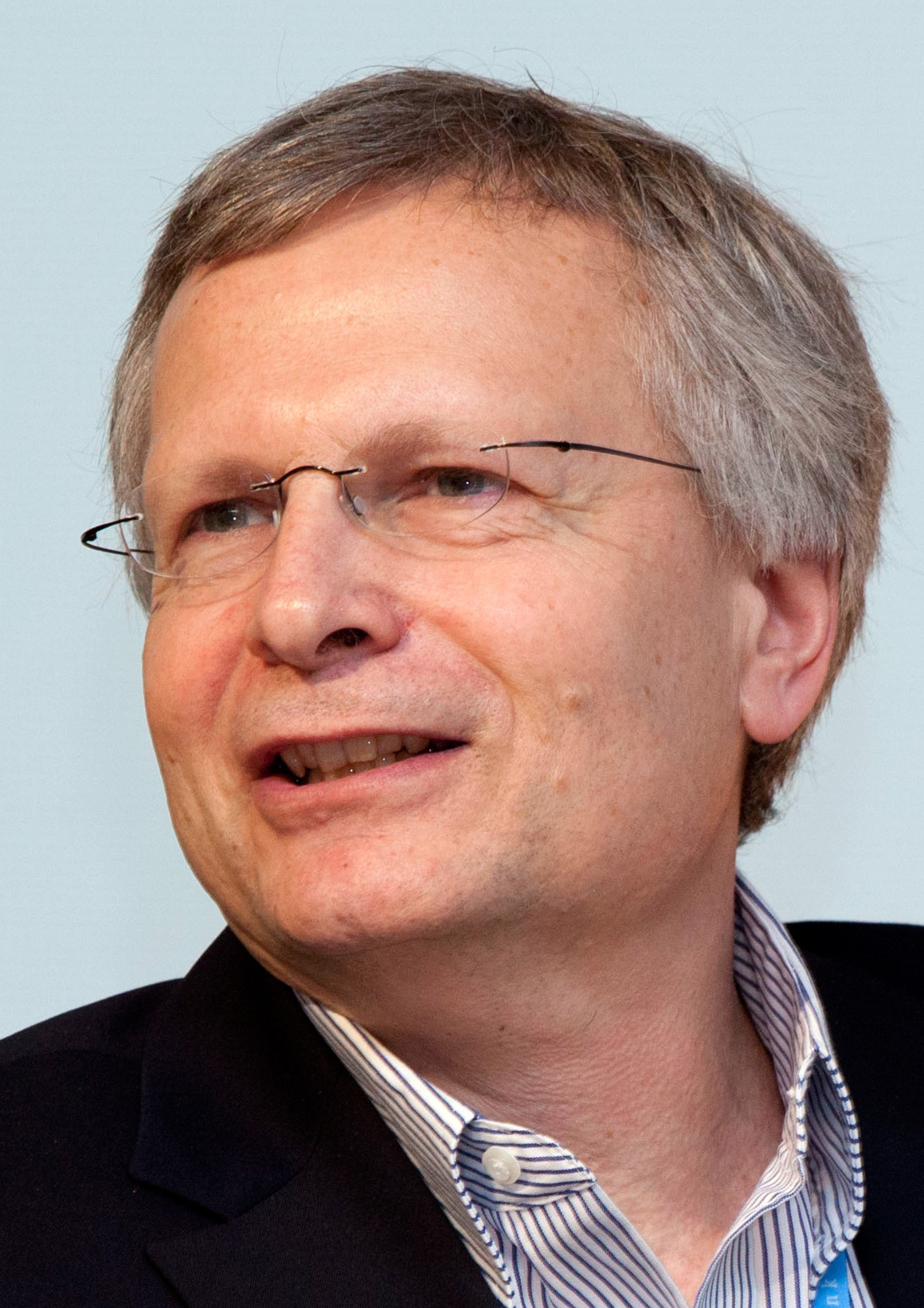
Dani Rodrik, Turkish economist and professor at Harvard University

- Maír José Benardete (1895–1989), Ottoman-born American scholar of Sephardic studies; professor at Brooklyn College
- Ruth Behar (born 1956), Cuban-American anthropologist; professor at the University of Michigan
- José Benardete (1928–2016), American philosopher; professor of philosophy at Syracuse University
- Seth Benardete (1930–2001), American classicist; professor New York University and The New School
- Doron Ben-Atar (born 1957), American historian and playwright; professor of history at Fordham University
- Seyla Benhabib (born 1950), Turkish-born American political theorist; professor at Columbia Law School
- Edit Doron (1951–2019), Israeli linguist; professor at Hebrew University of Jerusalem
- Lois Ellen Frank (born 1960), American food historian; professor at the Institute of American Indian Arts
- Yomtov Garti (1915–2011), Turkish mathematician and a teacher of mathematics, physics and cosmography
- John Gerassi (1931–2012), French-American professor, journalist and political activist
- Joseph Halévy (1827–1917), French orientalist and traveller; professor of Ethiopic in the École pratique des hautes études; librarian of the Société Asiatique
- Israel Hanukoglu (born 1952), Turkish-born Israeli biochemist; professor at Ariel University; former science and technology adviser to the prime minister of Israel (1996–1999)
- Yossef H. Hatzor (born 1959), Israeli professor of Earth and Environmental Sciences at the Ben-Gurion University of the Negev
- Jaklin Kornfilt (c. 1940s), Turkish theoretical linguist and professor at Syracuse University; known for her contributions to the fields of Turkish language and grammar, and Turkic language typology
- Miriam Lichtheim (1914–2004), Turkish-born American-Israeli Egyptologist, academic, librarian and translator
- Jacob L. Moreno (1889–1974), Romanian-American psychiatrist; the founder of psychodrama; pioneer of group psychotherapy
- Jonathan D. Moreno (born 1952), American philosopher and historian; professor at the University of Pennsylvania
- Aron Rodrigue (born 1957), Turkish-born American professor in Jewish Culture and History at Stanford University
- Dani Rodrik (born 1957), Turkish economist and professor at Harvard University
- Nathan Salmon (born 1951), American philosopher; professor at the University of California, Santa Barbara
- Ishak Saporta (born 1957), Israeli professor of business ethics at Tel Aviv University
- Simon Schama (born 1945), English historian and television presenter; professor at Columbia University

=== Arts and entertainment ===
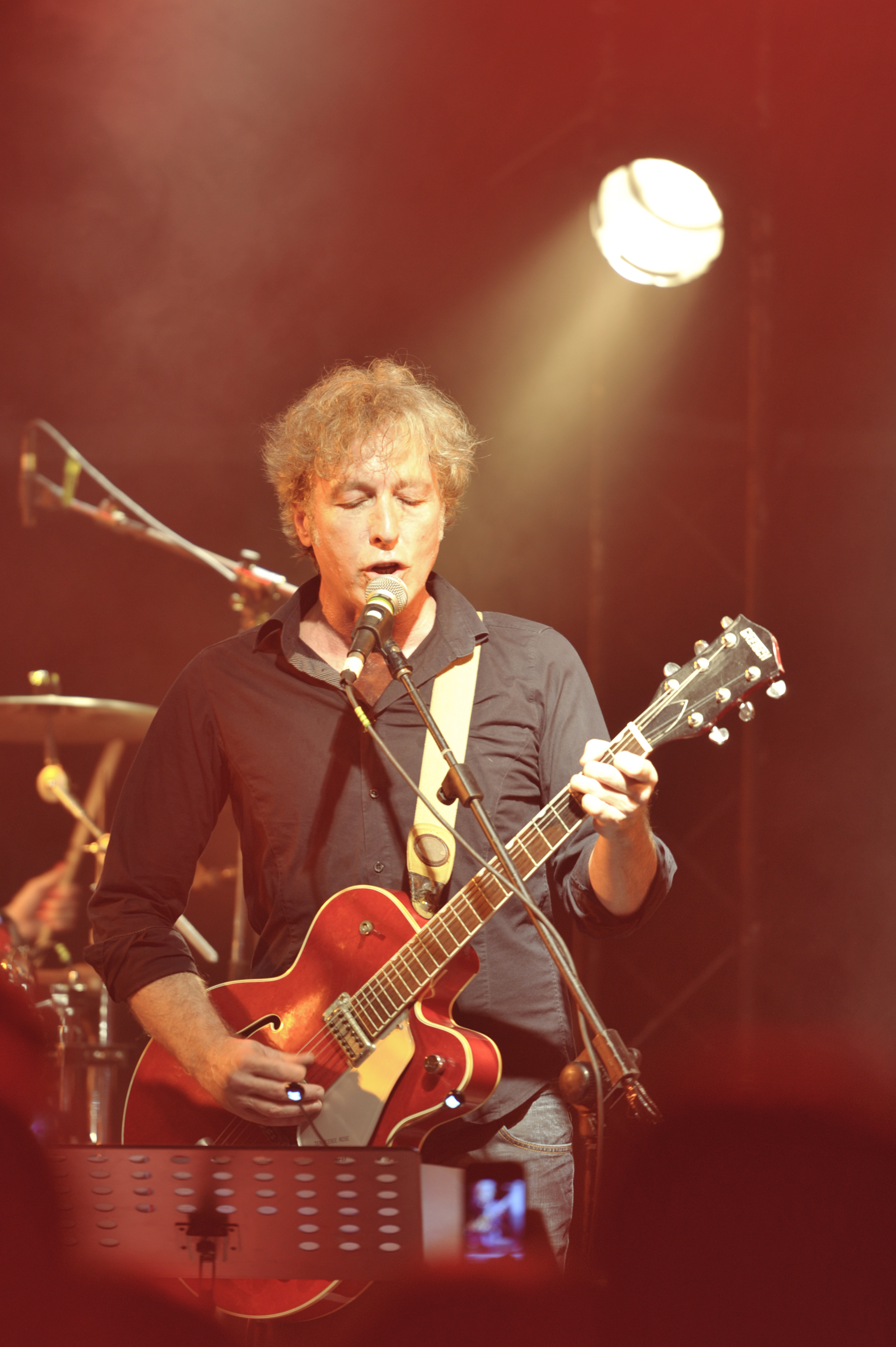
Berry Sakharof, Israeli rock singer and guitarist

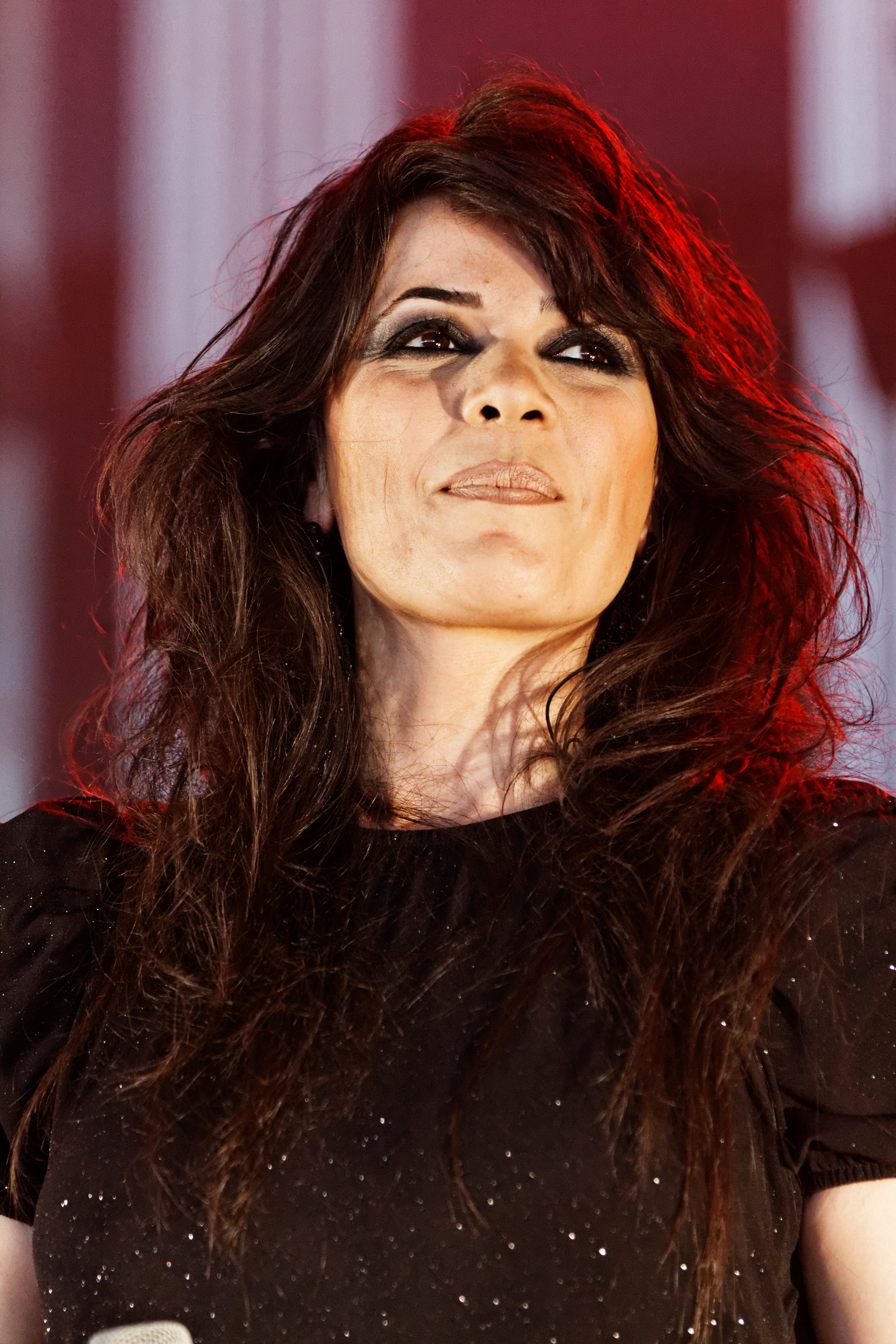
Yasmin Levy, Ladino singer

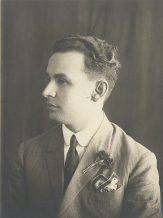
Alberto Hemsi, composer

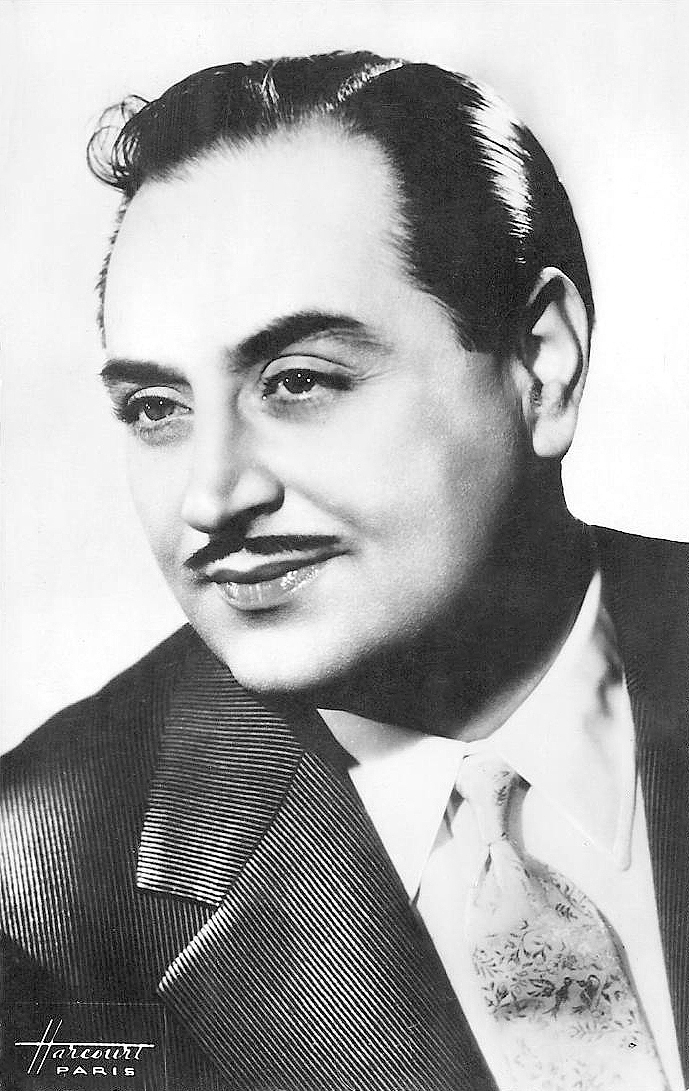
Dario Moreno, Turkish singer

- Maurice Abravanel (1903–1993), Ottoman-born American classical music conductor
- Anjelika Akbar (born 1969), Turkish composer, pianist and writer
- Philip Arditti (born 1979), Turkish theatre and television actor
- Adi Ashkenazi (born 1975), Israeli actress, screenwriter and stand-up comedian
- Lior Ashkenazi (born 1968), Israeli actor, voice actor, comedian and television presenter
- Mili Avital (born 1972), Israeli actress
- Aki Avni (born 1967), Israeli actor, entertainer and television host
- Jeff Baena (born 1977–), American screenwriter and film director
- Kathy Barr (1929–2008), American vocalist
- Albert Beger (born 1959), Istanbul-born Israeli saxophonist and flutist
- Bea Benaderet (1906–1968), American actress
- Albert Bitran (1931–2018), French painter and sculptor
- Can Bonomo (born 1987), Turkish singer who represented Turkey in the Eurovision Song Contest 2012
- Assi Cohen (born 1974), Israeli comedian and actor
- Sacha Distel (1933–2004), French musician
- Bob Dylan (born 1941), American singer and songwriter; 2016 Nobel Prize in Literature winner
- Jesse Dylan (born 1966), American film director and production executive
- Roza Eskenazi (1890 – 1980), Istanbul-born Greek dancer and singer of rebetiko
- Savi Gabizon (born 1960), Israeli filmmaker, screenwriter and producer
- Yehoram Gaon (born 1939), Israeli singer, actor, director, comedian, producer, television and radio host
- Miki Gavrielov (born 1949), Israeli composer
- Fernando Gerassi (1899–1974), Turkish-born American artist
- Eydie Gormé (1928–2013), American singer
- Isaac Guillory (1947–2000), American folk guitarist
- Sienna Guillory (born 1975), English actress and former model
- Emma Kingston (born 1991), British stage actress
- Lainie Kazan (born 1940), American actress and singer
- Alberto Hemsi (1898–1975), Turkish-born French composer
- Victoria Kamhi (c. 1905–1997), Turkish pianist
- Tchéky Karyo (1953–2025), French actor and musician
- Victor Laredo (1910–2003), American documentary photographer
- Shaily Lipa (born 1974), Israeli cookbook author, content creator and TV cookery show host
- Sami Levi (born 1981), Turkish soloist of the Turkish band Sefarad
- Kohava Levy (born 1946), Israeli singer, songwriter, composer and poet in Ladino
- Yasmin Levy (born 1975), Israeli Ladino singer and songwriter
- Yitzhak Levy (1919–1977), Israeli singer, songwriter, musicologist and composer in Ladino
- Linet (born 1975), Turkish-Israeli singer
- Art Metrano (1936–2001), American actor
- Paul Misraki (1908–1998), French composer
- Darío Moreno (1921–1968), Turkish polyglot singer
- Eliad Nachum (born 1990), Israeli singer, songwriter and television actor
- Germaine Poliakov (1918–2020), French music teacher and Holocaust survivor
- Jacques Rémy (1911–1981), French screenwriter
- Berry Sakharof (born 1957), Israeli rock guitarist, singer, songwriter and producer
- Rudolph Schildkraut (1862–1930), Austrian film and theatre actor
- Altina Schinasi (1907–1999), American sculptor, filmmaker, actress and inventor
- Neil Sedaka (born 1939), American singer, songwriter and pianist
- Rotem Sela (born 1953), Israeli actress best known for starring in the Israeli television series Beauty and the Baker (2013–2021)
- Shlomi Shabat (born 1954), Israeli vocalist and musician
- Cem Stamati (born 1981), bass guitar player of the Turkish band Sefarad
- Alona Tal (born 1983), Israeli actress and singer
- Roy Gokay Wol (born 1984), Turkish-Israeli film producer and director
- Ed Wynn (1886–1966), American actor and comedian
- Keenan Wynn (1916–1986), American character actor
- Ned Wynn (1941–2020), American actor and screenwriter

=== Business ===
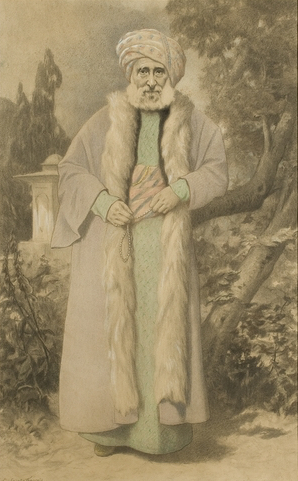
Abraham Salomon Camondo, Ottoman financier and philanthropist; patriarch of the House of Camondo

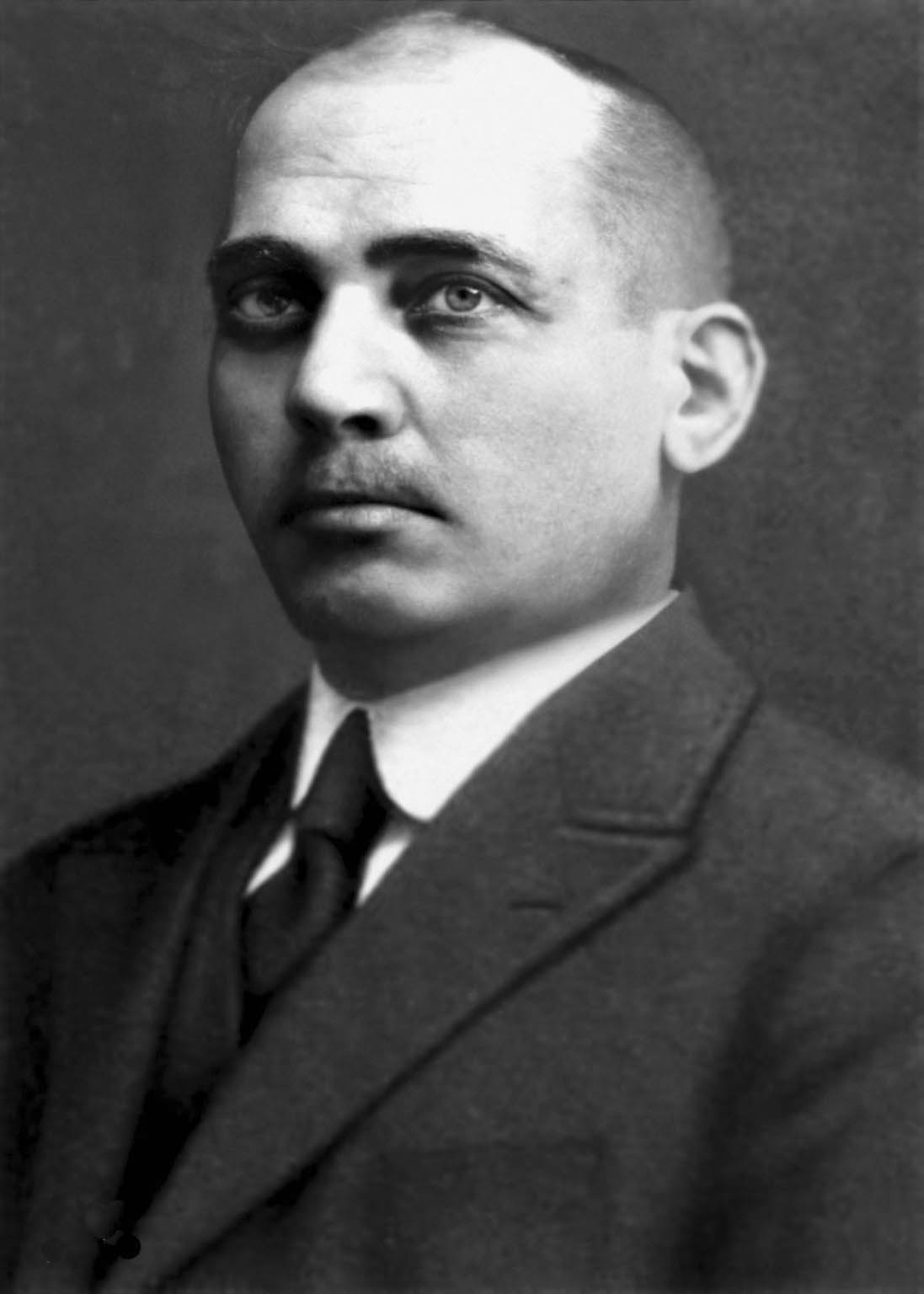
Isaac Carasso, founder of Groupe Danone

- Ishak Alaton (1927–2016), Turkish businessman and co-founder of Alarko Holding
- Leyla Alaton (born 1961), Turkish businesswoman and art collector, board member of Alarko and Alvimedica
- Isak Andic (1953–2024), Turkish-Spanish businessman and co-founder of clothing retailer Mango
- Howard Behar (born 1944), American businessman; president of Starbucks Coffee Company International
- Abraham Salomon Camondo (1781–1873), Ottoman financier and philanthropist; patriarch of the House of Camondo
- Isaac de Camondo (1851–1911), Ottoman-born French businessman and art collector
- Moïse de Camondo (1860–1935), Ottoman-born French banker and art collector
- Isaac Carasso (1874–1939), Ottoman-born Spanish businessman; founder of Groupe Danone; member of Carasso family
- Giuseppe Eskenazi (born 1939), Turkish businessman and Chinese art dealer; founder of Eskenazi
- Üzeyir Garih (1929–2001), Turkish businessman and co-founder of Alarko Holding
- Cem Hakko (born 1955), Turkish businessman and president of Vakko
- Vitali Hakko (1913–2007), Turkish businessman, founder of the Vakko
- Jeffi Medina (born 1950), Turkish businessman and co-founder of Medina Turgul DDB; former president of Advertising Association of Turkey
- Gracia Mendes Nasi (1510–1569), Ottoman-Portuguese philanthropist, businesswoman, and member of the Mendes Benveniste family; one of the wealthiest and most influential women of Renaissance Europe; known for securing a long-term lease of Tiberias in the Safed sanjak (modern day Israel) from Suleiman the Magnificent
- Silvio Santos (1930–2024), Brazilian media mogul and television host
- Morris Schinasi (1855–1928), Ottoman-born American businessman in the tobacco industry
- Izak Senbahar (born 1959), American real estate developer

=== Politics, military and government ===
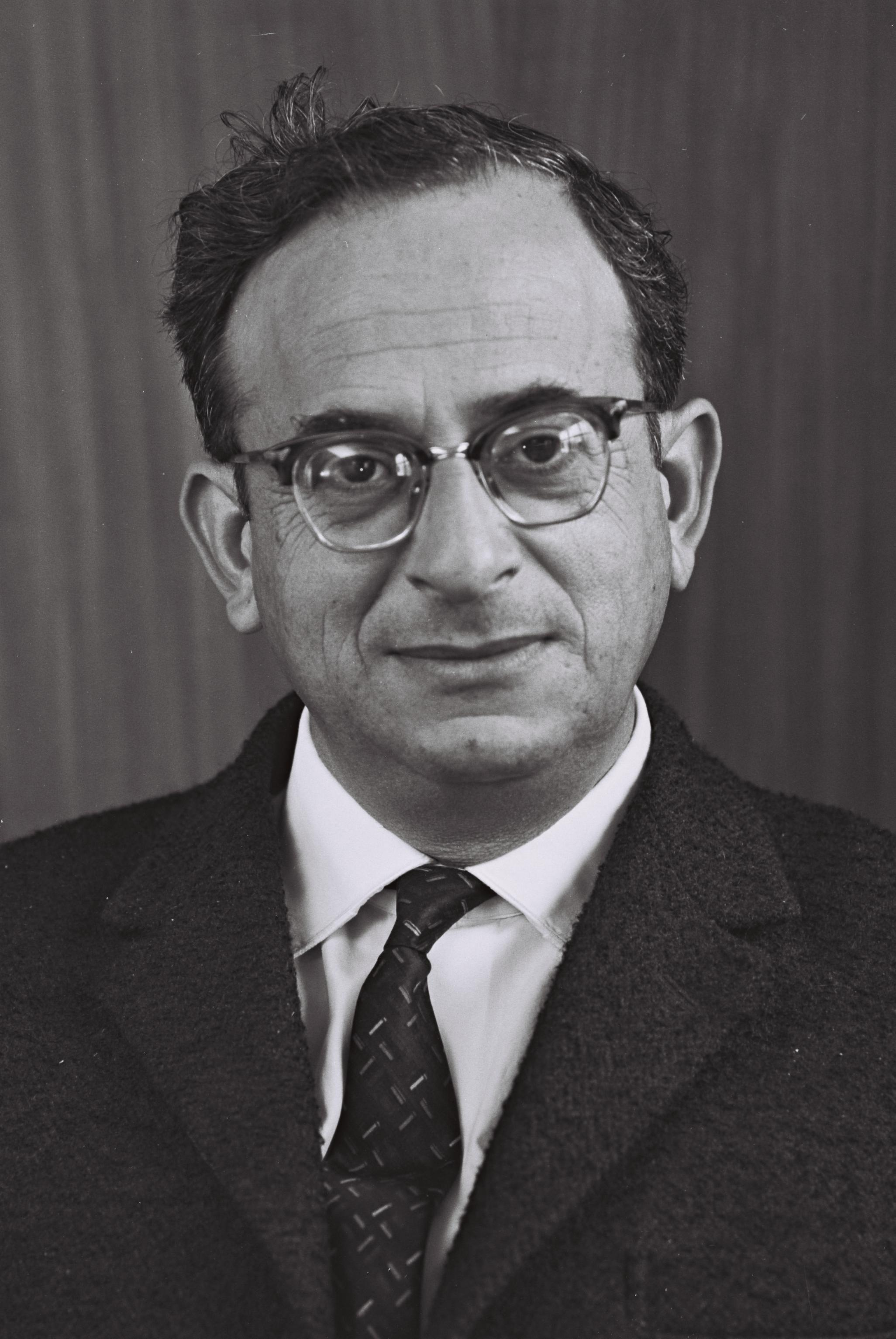
Yitzhak Navon, President of Israel from 1978 to 1983

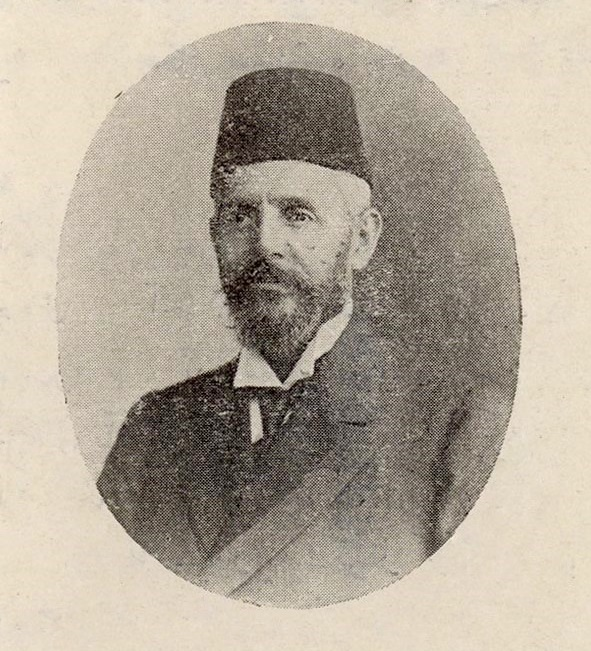
Emmanuel Carasso, Ottoman lawyer and member of the Ottoman Chamber of Deputies

- Avichay Adraee (born 1982), Israeli military officer; head of the Arab media division of the IDF Spokesperson's Unit
- Mordechai Alkahi (1925–1947), Petah Tikva-born Turkish member of the Irgun
- Solomon Ashkenazi (c. 1520–1602), Ottoman-Venetian physician and businessman active in Ottoman, Venetian and Polish–Lithuanian politics
- Ruhama Avraham (born 1964), Israeli politician who served as a member of the Knesset
- Esther Benbassa (born 1950), French historian and politician; member of the French Senate (2011–2023)
- Avraham Ben-Shoshan (born 1940), Israeli military officer; Commander of the Israeli Navy (1985-1989)
- Eliezer Cohen (born 1934), Israeli politician who served as a member of the Knesset
- Geulah Cohen (1925–2019), Israeli politician and activist
- Nechemya Cohen (1943–1967), Israeli soldier; the most decorated soldier in the history of the IDF
- Steve Cohen (born 1949), American attorney and politician; member of the U.S. House of Representatives
- Dalia Dorner (born 1934), Israeli-Turkish judge; justice of the Supreme Court of Israel (1993-2004)
- Shlomo Gazit (1926–2020), Israeli military officer and academic; major general in the Israel Defense Forces, head of the Military Intelligence Directorate
- Mordechai Gazit (1922–2016), Israeli diplomat; adviser to Israeli Prime Minister Golda Meir; ambassador to France; and Director-General of the Israeli Foreign Ministry
- Françoise Giroud (1916–2003), French journalist, screenwriter, writer, and politician; Minister of Culture
- Emanuel Karasu (1862–1934), Ottoman lawyer and politician; member of the Ottoman Chamber of Deputies, member of the Young Turks
- Ileana Ros-Lehtinen (born 1952), American politician, member of the U.S. House of Representatives
- Alejandro Mayorkas (born 1959), American attorney and government official, 7th United States Secretary of Homeland Security
- Tamir Pardo (born 1953), Israeli intelligence officer; 11th Director of Mossad
- Emin Pasha (1840–1892), Ottoman physician, naturalist, and governor of the Egyptian province of Equatoria on the upper Nile
- Luisa Porritt (born 1987), British politician
- Issy Smith (1890–1940), British-Australian military officer and recipient of the Victoria Cross
- Moshe Bar Siman Tov (born 1976), Israeli economist and the Director-General of the Ministry of Health
- David Tzur (born 1959), Israeli politician and former policeman; member of the Knesset

=== Religion ===
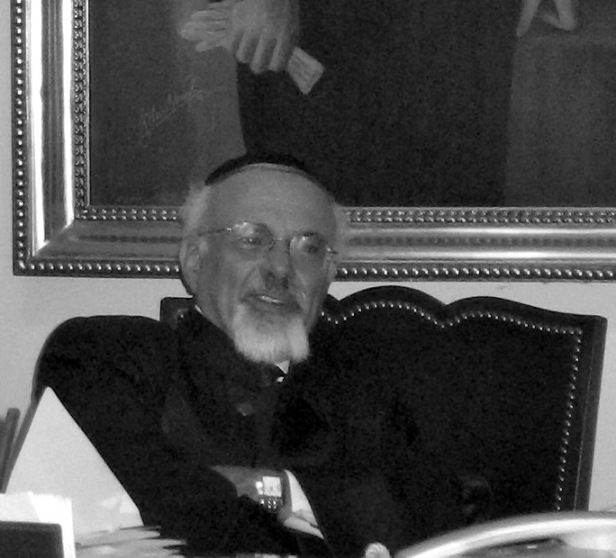
Ishak Haleva, Hakham Bashi (Chief Rabbi) of Turkey (2002-2025)

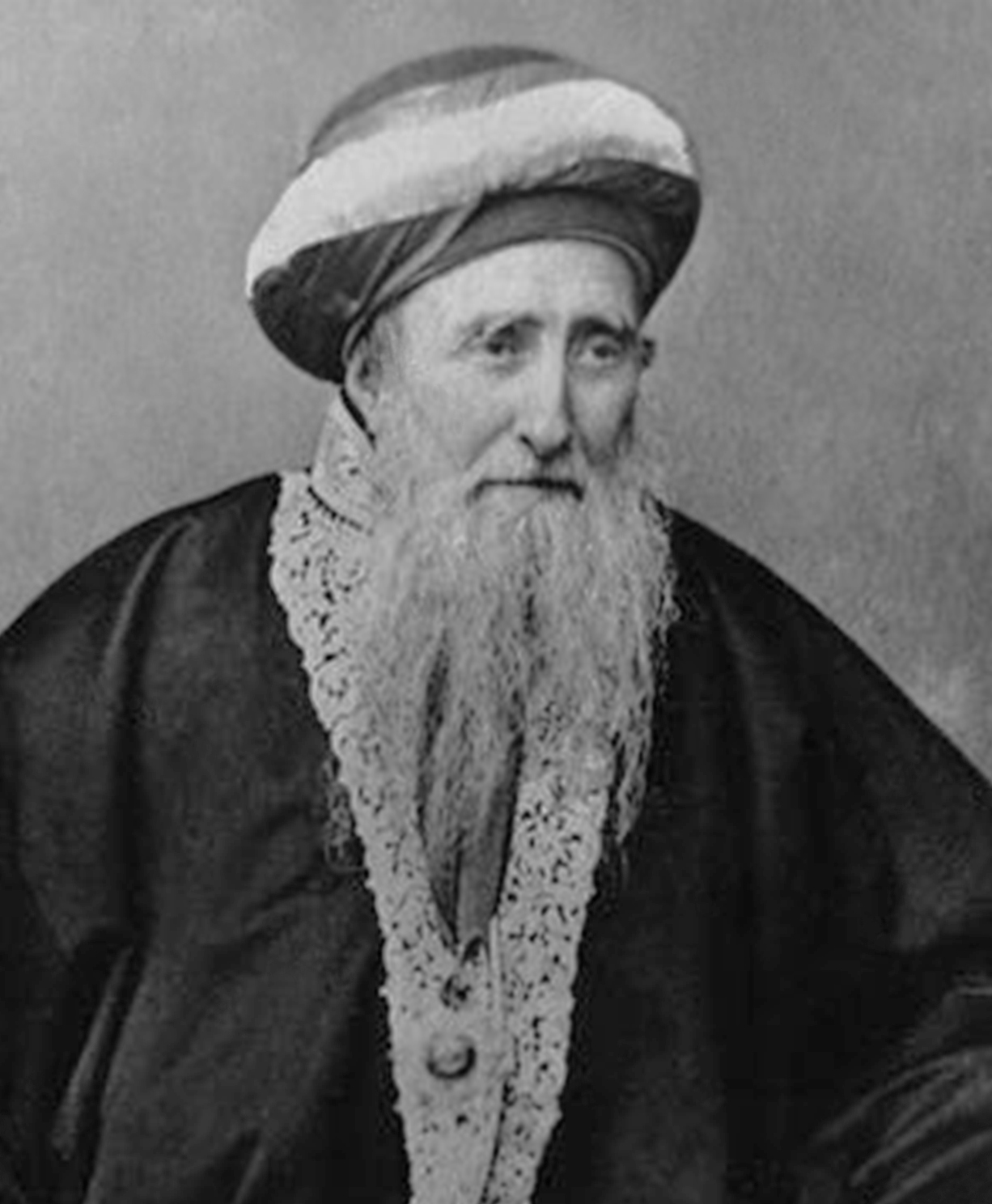
Abraham Palacci, Chief Rabbi and author of Smyrna; member of the Pallache family

- Aaron Alfandari (c. 1700–1774), Turkish Talmudic writer
- Marc D. Angel (born 1945), American rabbi and author
- Hayyim Isaac Algazi (d. c. 1819), Turkish Chief Rabbi of Smyrna
- Yom Tov Algazi (1727–1782), Ottoman Chief Rabbi of Jerusalem (1773-1782)
- Hayyim ben Jacob Alfandari (1558–1640), Turkish Talmudic educator and writer
- Solomon Eliezer Alfandari (c. 1826–1830), Ottoman rabbi, kabbalist and rosh yeshiva of Istanbul
- Albert Jean Amateau (1889–1996), Turkish rabbi, lawyer and social activist
- David Asseo (1914–2002), Turkish rabbi; Hakham Bashi (Chief Rabbi) of the Republic of Turkey (1961-2002)
- Asenath Barzani (1590 – 1670), Ottoman-Kurdish female rabbinical scholar and poet
- Joshua ben Israel Benveniste (c. 1590 – 1668), Ottoman rabbi at Constantinople and physician
- Elijah Capsali (c. 1485–1550), Ottoman rabbi and historian
- Moses Capsali (1420–1495), Ottoman rabbi; first Hakham Bashi (Chief Rabbi) of the Ottoman Empire
- Abraham Danon (1857–1925), Turkish rabbi, Hebraist, writer and poet
- Haim Moussa Douek (1905–1974), Turkish rabbi; last Chief Rabbi of Egypt
- Menahem Egozi (c. 1500s), Turkish Talmudist
- Ishak Haleva (1940–2025), Turkish rabbi; Hakham Bashi (Chief Rabbi) of Turkey (2002-2025)
- Aaron ben Solomon ben Hasun (c. 1500s), Turkish rabbi and Talmudic scholar
- Barzillai ben Baruch Jabez (c. 1700s), Turkish Talmudist
- Elijah Mizrachi (c. 1455–1525), Ottoman Talmudist and posek; authority on Halakha and mathematician
- Chaim Nahum (1872–1960), Turkish rabbi; Grand Rabbi of the Ottoman Empire; jurist, and linguist; member of the Turkish delegation for the Lausanne Treaty
- Abraham Palacci (c. 1809–1898), Turkish rabbi; Chief Rabbi and author of Smyrna; member of the Pallache family
- Haim Palachi (c. 1788–1868), Turkish rabbi; Chief Rabbi of Smyrna and Gaon
- Joseph Palacci (1815–1896), Turkish rabbi and author in Ladino and Hebrew in Smyrna
- Rahamim Nissim Palacci (1813–1907), Turkish rabbi; Chief Rabbi of Smyrna and author
- Mosè Piccio (d. c. 1576), Ottoman lexicographer; compiled Zikhron Torat Moshe (Hebrew: זכרון תורת משה)
- Benjamin Pontremoli (1740–1784), Turkish rabbi and poet, member of the Pontremoli dynasty
- Yitzhak Sarfati (d. c. 1400s), French-Ottoman rabbi; Chief Rabbi of Edirne
- Joseph Taitazak (d. c. 1529), Ottoman Talmudic authority and Kabbalist; member of the Taitazak family
- Sabbatai Zevi (1926–1676), Ottoman former Jewish mystic and rabbi from Smyrna; founder of the Sabbatean movement
- Aaron Zorogon (d. c. 1600s), Turkish Torah scholar

=== Sports ===
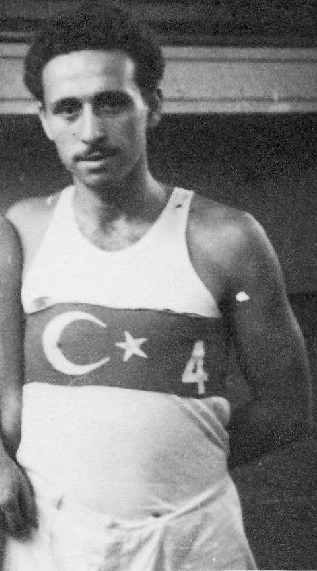
Avram Barokas, basketball player and coach

- Eli Abarbanel (born 1976), Israeli football player
- Barak Bakhar (born 1979), Israeli former player and the current manager of Maccabi Haifa
- Pini Balili (born 1979), Israeli former football manager and former football player
- Avram Barokas (1926–2003), Turkish basketball player and coach
- Arik Benado (born 1973), Israeli football manager and former player
- Joe Bonomo (1901–1978), American weightlifter, strongman and actor
- Rober Eryol (1930–2000), Turkish football player for Galatasaray and manager for Hapoel Be'er-Sheva
- Umut Güzelses (born 1987), Turkish-Israeli football player
- Alfred König (1913–1987), Turkish Olympic sprinter and 1935 Maccabiah Games competitor
- Jack Molinas (1931–1975), American professional basketball player; NBA All-Star (1954)
- Adi Soffer (born 1987), Israeli footballer
- Avi Soffer (born 1986), Israeli football player
- Garrett Wittels (born 1990), American baseball player

=== Literature and journalism ===
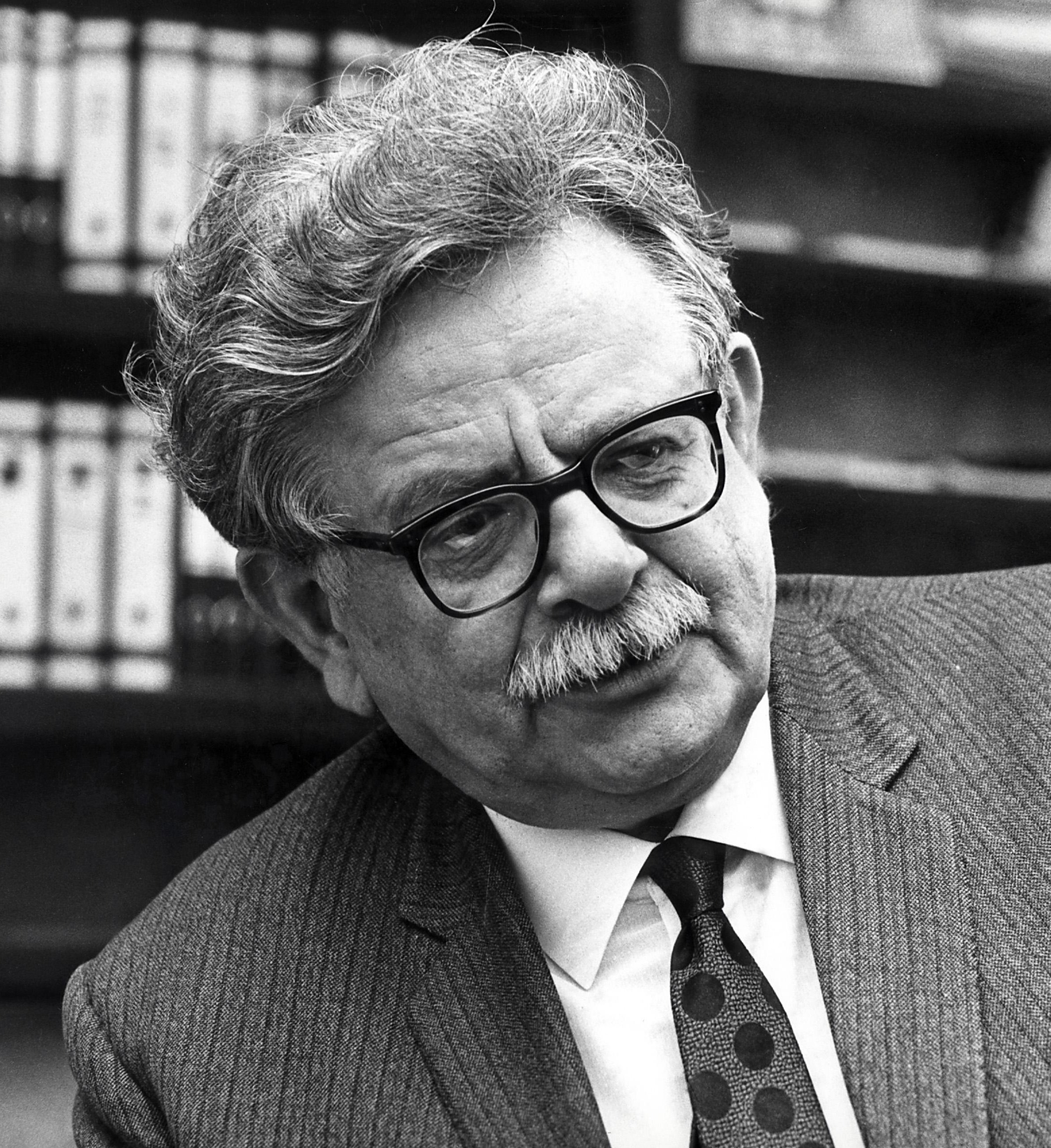
Elias Canetti, author, 1981 Nobel Prize in Literature winner

- Alexander Aciman (born 1990), American writer and journalist
- André Aciman (born 1951), American writer
- Stella Aciman (born 1953), Turkish novelist, columnist for Yeni Düzen
- Beki Luiza Bahar (1926–2011), Turkish writer and playwright
- Asa Benveniste (1925–1990), American poet, typographer and publisher
- Elias Canetti (1905–1994), German-language writer, novelist, memoirist; 1981 Nobel Prize in Literature winner
- Elia Carmona (1869–1931), Ottoman author and journalist; founder of El Jugueton (Hebrew: איל ג'וגיטון)
- Vitalis Danon (1897–1969), Ottoman-Tunisian writer and educator at Alliance Israélite Universelle
- Moris Farhi (1935–2019), Turkish author, vice president of International PEN (2001-2019)
- Erol Güney (1914–2009), Turkish-Israeli journalist, translator and author
- Albert Karasu (1885–1982), Turkish journalist
- Sami Kohen (1928–2021), Turkish journalist and columnist for Milliyet
- Mario Levi (1957–2024), Turkish novelist, journalist and scholar with a focus on modern Turkish literature
- Peter Levi (1931–2000), English poet, archaeologist, Jesuit priest, travel writer, biographer, academic and critic; Professor of Poetry at the University of Oxford (1984–1989)
- Saadia ben Abraham Longo (d. c. 1500s), Turkish Hebrew poet
- Roni Margulies (1955–2023), Turkish poet, author, translator and political activist
- Leandra Medine (born 1988), American author and blogger
- Édouard Roditi (1910–1992), American poet, short-story writer, critic and translator of Turkish
- Moshe Shaul (1929–2023), Israeli journalist, writer and researcher of the culture of Sephardi Jews
- Diana Souhami (born 1940), English writer
- Benny Ziffer (born 1953), Israeli author and journalist

=== Miscellaneous ===
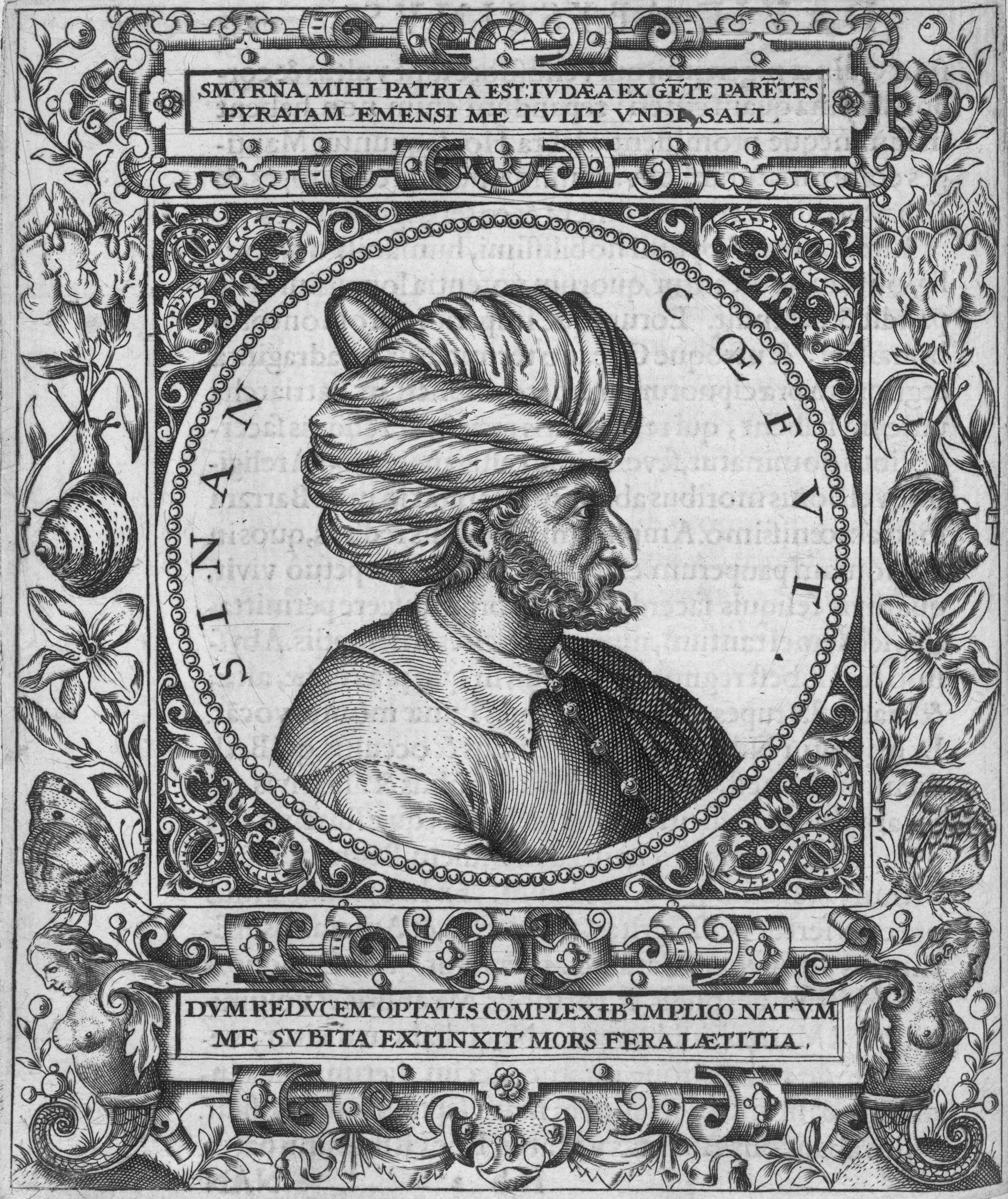
Sinan Reis, Ottoman corsair and second in command of Hayreddin Barbarossa

- Tobias Cohn (1652–1729), Polish-Ottoman physician to Ottoman Sultan Mehmed IV, Suleiman II, Ahmed II, Mustafa II and Ahmed III
- Jacque Fresco (1916–2007), American futurist
- Bohor Hallegua (d. c. 1926), Ottoman chess player
- Moses Hamon (1490–1554), Ottoman physician and patron Jewish learning
- Yolande Harmer (1913–1959), Israeli intelligence officer who operated in Egypt
- Hila Klein (born 1987), Israeli-American YouTuber
- Liran Kohener (born 1988), Israeli model; Miss Israel 2007
- Rodrigo Lehtinen (born 1986), American LGBTQ rights advocate
- Joseph Nasi (1524–1579), Ottoman diplomat and administrator; influential figure in the Ottoman Empire during the rules of both Sultan Suleiman I and Selim II
- Joseph Niego (1863–1945), Turkish-born Jewish activist
- Lenore Skenazy (born 1959), American speaker, blogger, syndicated columnist, author, and reality show host
- Rona Ramon (1964–2018), Israeli public activist and STEM influencer
- Sinan Reis (c. 1533–1546), Ottoman corsair; second in command of the Ottoman admiral Hayreddin Barbarossa
- Solomon ibn Verga (c. 1460–1554), historian, physician, and author of the Shevet Yehudah (Hebrew: שבט יהודה)

== See also ==
- List of Bosnians
- List of Bulgarians
- List of Croatians
- List of Greeks
- List of Serbs
- List of Slovenians
- List of Turks
- List of Macedonians
