= Alaton =

Alaton is a surname. Notable people with the surname include:

- İshak Alaton (1927–2016), Turkish businessman and investor of Jewish descent
- Kalef Alaton (1940–1989), Turkish interior designer
- Leyla Alaton (born 1961), Turkish businesswoman and art collector

== See also ==
- Alton (surname)
