= Üzeyir =

Üzeyir is a Turkish given name transliterated from Ezra. Notable people with the name include:

- Üzeyir Garih (1929–2001), Turkish Jewish businessman
- Uzeyir Hajibeyov (1885–1948), Azerbaijani and Soviet composer
