= Stamati =

Stamati is a surname of the Greek origins. Notable people with the surname include:

- Cem Stamati (born 1981), Turkish musician
- Constantin Stamati (1786–1869), Moldavian writer and translator
- Evdokia Stamati (born 1984), Greek basketball player
- Giovanni Stamati (1912–1987), Italian hierarch of the Italo-Albanian Catholic Church
