= Leyla Alaton =

Turkish businesswoman and art collector

Leyla Alaton is a Turkish businesswoman and art collector, and a member of the board of the Alarko group of companies. She has held that position since 2008. She is also a Board Member of Alvimedica Medical Devices.

== Biography ==
Alaton was born in Istanbul. She is the daughter of İshak Alaton, one of the founders of Alarko Holding, one of the largest business conglomerates in Turkey, listed on the Istanbul Stock Exchange. Her father died on September 11, 2016.

Alaton studied at Şişli Terakki Primary School, Sainte-Pulchérie French Secondary School and Notre Dame de Sion French High School in Istanbul. She also has a degree in business administration and management from Fairleigh Dickinson University, and completed a master's degree in social sciences at New York University.

Alaton started her entrepreneurial career by selling belts while in the United States. She is a founding member of Kadiger, the Turkish Association of Women Entrepreneurs. She is a popular speaker on women's rights issues and on the role of women in modern Turkey, as well as fostering social entrepreneurship.

In 1993, she was one of the first Leaders of the Future named at the Davos World Economic Forum. In 2014, she was made Chevalier of the French Légion d'honneur.

== Art ==
Alaton collects contemporary art by artists from Turkey and abroad. She is a member of Contemporary Art Istanbul Consultative Committee and the Leadership Council of the New Museum in New York City.

== Honours ==
- Chevalier (Knight) of the French Légion d'honneur (1994).
