= Aciman =

Aciman is a surname. Notable people with the surname include:

- Alexander Aciman (born 1990), American writer and journalist
- André Aciman (born 1951), Italian-American writer and academic
- Stella Aciman (born 1953), Turkish novelist, columnist, and businesswoman

== See also ==
- Acidman
