= Moshe Hacohen =

Tunisian rabbi

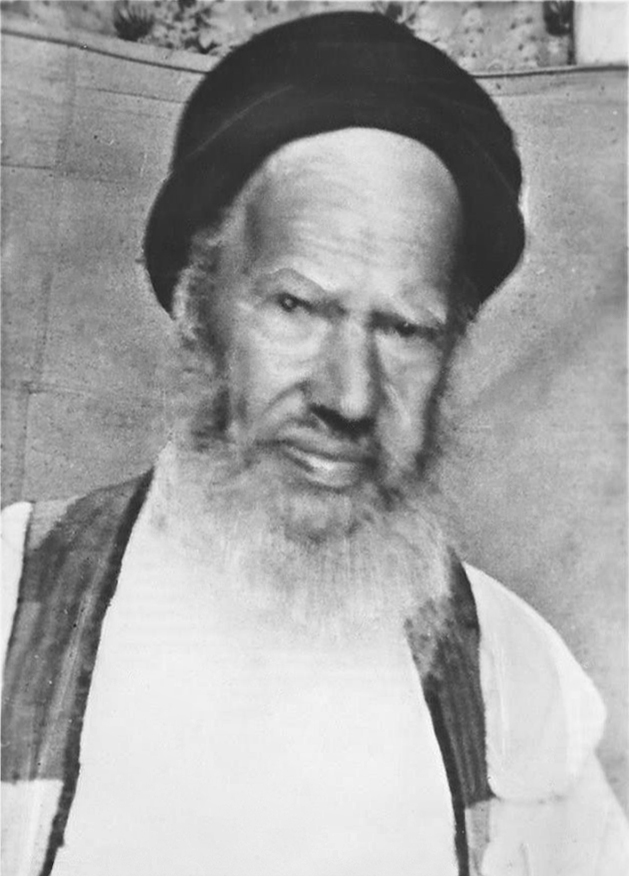
Moshe Kalphon Hacohen

Moshe Kalphon Hacohen (1874–1950), also known by his acronym Ramach, was one of the leading rabbis of the island of Djerba, Tunisia, during the 20th century.

== Early life and family ==
Hacohen, a kohen by birth, was born in 1874 to Rabbi Shalom Hacohen and his wife Tarachi, on the island of Djerba off the coast of Tunisia. He was named after his grandfather, Rabbi Moshe Hacohen, author of the book Pnai Moshe; "Halphon" is a nickname. His great-grandfather, Rabbi Shaul (Saul) Hacohen was the head of the rabbinical court in Djerba.

During his youth Moshe's family were well off financially and they were well known for their generosity and the support they gave to the elderly and poor of Djerba. However, when he became a teenager his family's financial situation deteriorated and Moshe had to contribute to support his family by working as a book editor and copyist. His father Rabbi Shalom, the author of numerous books including Nahar Shalom, Hefetz Yakar and HaimVeShalom, was initially the rabbi and head of the local rabbinical court in the city of Zervis, near Djerba, but in 1924 he emigrated to Mandatory Palestine to join the Elders of Zefat (Safed).

He received his Jewish education from his father as well as the chief rabbi of Tunisia, Rabbi Yoseph (Joseph) Barbi. When his father was called upon to be the rabbi of Zervis, Moshe was asked by the local community to become their ritual slaughterer. At the age of 17 he mastered the laws of Jewish ritual slaughter and began to work in the profession. However, the difficult conditions, primarily the outdoor heat during the summer, caused him to become feverish as well as affecting his vision. He wished to continue working in order to help his family financially, but they prevailed upon him to return to Djerba and to continue with his studies.

In 1895, at the age of 21, Moshe married Masida, daughter of his maternal uncle Rabbi Aharon Hacohen. The couple has two sons: Avraham and Shushan, and four daughters: Haviva, Rachel, Amima, and Plila. Shushan would eventually take his father's place as chief rabbi of Djerba and is well known for his book "Moshav Eitan". Avraham wrote his first book, Birchat Avraham, at the age of 14 and eventually became a rabbi. He died at the age of 33 following a short illness. His death has a strong effect on his father, who emphasized it greatly in his memoirs.

Hacohen was related to Abraham Palacci, grand rabbi of Izmir.

== Leadership ==
In 1917, at the age of 43, Rabbi Moshe was appointed as a member of the rabbinical court of Djerba (serving together with Rabbi Zvi Hacohen Yehonatan and Rabbi Mordechai Emaus Cohen). It took a great deal of pressure to persuade him to accept the appointment; he completely refused the position of head of the court and only accepted the appointment as the third member. This court enacted a number of important decrees and carefully regulated the lives of the Jewish communities throughout the island.

In 1943 the Nazis came to Tunisia, and demanded that Rabbi Moshe collect 50 kilos of gold in 3 1/2 hours and hand it over to them; otherwise they would bomb the Jewish communities of Djerba and Tunis. The next day the Allies conquered Tunisia and the Nazis were gone from Tunisia. The 35 kilos of gold that the Jews managed to collect was not handed to the Germans.

== Relationship to Zionism, the State of Israel and Modernity ==
Rabbi Moshe was an enthusiastic supporter of the Zionist movement. Among other decrees, he decreed that Israel's Independence Day be celebrated for three days. His writings that predate the State of Israel are full of detailed political plans, not only regarding Zionist ideas but also expanding upon his cosmopolitan ideas, such as a plan to establish a League of Nations and a World Court, both of which would have their headquarters in Jerusalem.

While he was still living in Djerba he purchased land in Israel. In his old age, after his health deteriorated, he decided to emigrate to Israel. His son Shushan traveled to Tunis to arrange the necessary visas but Rabbi Moshe's health deteriorated even further and the emigration had to be called off.

== Death and Burial ==
Rabbi Moshe died on the 18th of Tevet 1950 in Djerba. During his funeral, the cities in the area emptied of their Jewish residents, all of whom attended the funeral. The main souk of Djerba was closed for the day, since most of the stores were owned by Jews. Tens of thousands of mourners, including representatives of the governments of Tunisia and France, attended the funeral. He was buried in Djerba but in 2006, 55 years after his death, his bones were moved from Tunisia to Israel (via France) to the Mount of Respite cemetery in Jerusalem. This transfer required the concerted efforts of many people, including the Foreign Minister of Tunisia. The second funeral, which lasted three days, was attended by thousands of Jews from Tunisia, France and Israel. Among the eulogizers was former Israeli chief rabbi Ovadiah Yosef, who characterized Rabbi Moshe's philosophy of Jewish law as closely adhering to the judgements of the author of the Shulchan Arukh (Rabbi Joseph Caro).

== Works ==
Approximately 80 of his works have been published, covering all facets of Judaism. Nonetheless, many works remain in manuscript. He is best known for two of his works in Jewish law (halacha): "Responsa Shoel VeNishal", a collection of more than 3,000 responsa he penned, in 8 volumes, and "Brit Kehuna", a compilation of the customs of the Jewish community of Djerba and its surroundings, following the order of the Shulchan Arukh. Among his works that remain in manuscript is: "Zedek VeRahamim".
