= Grim Reaper paradox =

Paradox involving infinity

The Grim Reaper paradox is a philosophical argument involving an infinite sequence of Grim Reapers, each tasked with killing a person if no reaper has already killed them. The paradox raises questions about the possibility of continuous time and the infinite past (temporal finitism).

It is inspired by J. A. Benardete's paradoxes from the 1964 book Infinity: An Essay in Metaphysics. Various formulations of paradoxes involving beginningless sets, whose members perform a function only if no previous member performs it, are all labelled "Benardete Paradoxes". These are examples of supertasks.

== Paradox ==
The paradox supposes there is an infinite sequence of Reapers, each assigned a time to kill a particular person. Each Reaper will only kill this person if no earlier Reaper has already killed them.

It is 12pm, and the first Reaper is set to kill the person at 1pm. The second Reaper is set to kill them at 12:30pm, the third at 12:15pm, and so on.

As a consequence of these propositions, the person will certainly be killed by a Reaper before 1pm; however, no individual Reaper can kill them, as there is always an earlier Reaper who would do so first. Therefore, it is impossible for the person to survive but also impossible that any Reaper kills them.

== Resolutions and implications ==
=== Discrete time ===
One solution to the paradox is supposing that time must be discrete rather than continuous. If so, an infinite number of Reapers cannot all have a separate time in which they will kill you, as there are only finitely many "moments" in each period of time. A possible issue with this solution is that the Reaper paradox can take different forms that do not rely upon continuous time. One such example appears in Benardete's book, in which a god throws up a wall if a man travels 1/2 mile, another god throws up a wall after 1/4 mile, another at 1/8 mile, ad infinitum. Discrete time would do nothing to prevent this paradox.

=== Causal finitism ===
Another solution is the idea of causal finitism, which asserts that there cannot be an infinite regress of causes. In other words, every causal chain must have a starting point. Thus, there cannot be an infinite number of Reapers whose actions depend on all previous Reapers. All Benardete paradoxes share this feature of an infinite causal chain, and so are all impossible.

Causal finitism does not force the discreteness of time and space. Moreover, it is consistent with an infinite past, as long as it does not imply a backward-infinite causal chain. Schmid and Malpass think that there are heavy metaphysical commitments, but others disagree.

=== Unsatisfiable Pair Diagnosis ===
A third potential solution to the Grim Reaper paradox has been suggested, known as the Unsatisfiable Pair Diagnosis (UPD). The UPD asserts that Benardete paradoxes (including the Grim Reaper paradox) are simply logically impossible, and no metaphysical thesis needs to be adopted. In The Form of the Benardete Dichotomy, Nickolas Shackel observes that all Benardete paradoxes involve two conditions:

1. The linearly ordered set S has no first member.
2. For all x in S, E at x iff E nowhere before x.

Shackel shows these statements to be formally inconsistent—they logically cannot both be true. The paradox assumes that some set of items could satisfy both statements, but no set can. However, the UPD does not help much with probabilistic or rationality paradoxes, whereas causal finitism has an advantage here. Another feature of the UPD is that it permits time travel in all cases except when a person is capable of killing their own grandfather, but in other cases, it is perfectly fine. Finally, the UPD is compatible with causal finitism insofar as it is a feature rather than a bug.

=== No-Actual-Infinities principle ===
A fourth proposed solution is a more general No-Actual-Infinities (NAI) principle, inspired by Aristotle, which dissolves all paradoxes involving an actually infinite number of things (including the many Benardete paradoxes, Thomson, Ross–Littlewood, and Banach–Tarski paradoxes, among others), while remaining relatively simple and elegant. NAI is consistent with all reasonable theories of time as well as with infinities of mathematics, propositions, and universals, since these entities do not have actual existence. Physicists generally avoid attributing infinite quantities to physical systems, which is in line with the NAI principle.

== Relevance to theism ==
According to Alexander Pruss, the Grim Reaper paradox provides grounds for thinking that the past is finite, i.e., that there must be a first period of time. This would support the Kalam cosmological argument, backing up the premise that the universe began to exist.

In 2018, Pruss provided a more thorough cosmological argument using causal finitism to motivate a "necessary uncaused cause". The argument is as follows:

1. Nothing has an infinite causal history. (Note: Due to causal finitism being assumed.)
2. There are no causal loops.
3. Something has a cause.
4. Therefore, there is an uncaused cause.

Pruss then adds the following causal principle: 5. Every contingent item has a cause. (Note: A contingent item is one such that it is possible for it to exist or to not exist, as opposed to a necessary item.) From this, the conclusion can be drawn that there is an uncaused cause that exists necessarily. Pruss states that it is still a major task to argue from a necessary first cause to theism.

Whilst the Kalam argument opposes sequences that go infinitely backwards in time, this argument denies all causally backwards-infinite sequences.
