= José Benardete =

American philosopher (1928–2016)

- Born: March 24, 1928; Brooklyn, United States
- Died: February 25, 2016 (aged 87)
- Spouse: Catherine Lord (m. 1961)

Education
- Education: University of Virginia (PhD)
- Thesis: An essay on time: wherein a neglected argument for the prime mover is shown to be demonstrative (1953)

Philosophical work
- Era: 21st-century philosophy
- Region: Western philosophy
- Institutions: Syracuse University
- Main interests: Metaphysics
- Notable ideas: Grim Reaper paradox
- Website: https://web.archive.org/web/20220218000933/https://sites.google.com/site/joseabenardete/

José Amado Benardete (March 24, 1928 – February 25, 2016), sometimes misspelled as Jose Bernadette, was an American philosopher and Emeritus Professor of Philosophy at Syracuse University. He was the son of Maír José Benardete and the brother of Seth Benardete and Diego Benardete, professor of mathematics at the University of Hartford. He is known for his works on metaphysics and infinity.

Benardete was notable for developing Grim Reaper paradoxes. In metaphysics and the philosophy of religion, these paradoxes against the infinitude of past causal chains have been utilized together with time travel paradoxes to argue for a kalam cosmological argument for the existence of a creator.

== Books ==
- Infinity: An Essay in Metaphysics (Clarendon Press, 1964)
- Metaphysics: The Logical Approach (Oxford University Press, 1989)
- Greatness of Soul: In Hume, Aristotle and Hobbes, As Shadowed by Milton's Satan (Cambridge Scholars Publishing, 2013)
