= Alvimedica =

Medical device and implant company

- Type: Private
- Industry: Medical Instruments & Supplies
- Founded: 2007
- Headquarters: Istanbul, Turkey
- Key people: Vedat Alaton, CEO
- Products: Medical devices
- Number of employees: 187 (2009)
- Website: www.alvimedica.com

Alvimedica is a manufacturer of medical devices, including coronary stents, balloon catheters, diagnostic and guiding catheters. The company was founded in 2007 by Turkish businessman İshak Alaton.

Alvimedica’s headquarters are a 5,500 m² facility located at the free trade zone in Catalca, Istanbul, Turkey. Alvimedica has one of the biggest Class 10,000 cleanrooms in Europe. With an area of 700 m², Alvimedica's Good Manufacturing Practice-compliant facility contains the main assembly of catheter and stent systems.

Current projects include renal and cranial intravascular stents. These include Coracto, the first drug-eluting stent developed and manufactured in Turkey. The company is also working on bio-degradable stents which completely dissolve in the vessel.

== Coracto SDS (Stent Delivery System) ==
Coracto is a drug-eluting stent made with a bioabsorbable polymer. In 2010, a pre-clinical and clinical study were conducted on Coracto. Prof. Nicolaus Reifart of the Main-Taunus-Privatklinik in Germany performed the clinical studies, CVPath's well-known Cardiac Pathologist Prof. Renu Virmani conducted animal studies on Coracto SDS (Stent Delivery System) and announced the results at EuroPCR 2009. The study conducted by Dr. Virmani used confocal, scanning electron and light microscopy to examine reendothelialization and inflammation at 14 and 28 days of Coracto, a rapamycin-eluting stent, versus, a sirolimus-eluting stent (SES) and an everolimus-eluting stent (EES) and a bare metal stent (Constant) as a control in a healthy rabbit iliac model. The trial was not powered for significance, but results indicate that endothelial coverage of Coracto at 14 days was better than that of both EES and SES. As expected, the bare metal stent showed the greatest endothelial coverage.

== Other Projects and Collaborations ==
Alvimedica also develops projects in collaboration with universities in Turkey such as Boğaziçi University, Istanbul University, Sabancı University, Bilkent University, Yıldız Technical University, Yeditepe University, and international universities like Drexel University (USA), Medical University of Vienna (Austria), and as well as institutions like TASSA (Turkish American Scientists and Scholars Association), CVPath International Registry of Pathology (USA), or the Main-Taunus-Private Clinic (Germany). Alvimedica works with Stent for Life to provide staff training.

In collaboration with TSC (Turkish Society of Cardiology), the company established Turkey's first cardiology simulation center. Together they provide training for Turkish cardiologists as part of an international project called Stent For Life. Through the training sessions the partnership aims at the early detecting of heart attacks and then making sure that the patient will receive the necessary treatment within an hour.

Alvimedica sponsored a team for the 2014–2015 Volvo Ocean Race, round-the-world sailing race.

== Investments ==
The company made its first investment move by purchasing Nemed, a medical device company, in 2007. In 2009, the company purchased an American company called In-Vivo, a manufacturer of angioplasty and angiography catheters, and one of the suppliers of Abbott Laboratories.
