= Rikard Lang =

Croatian professor, lawyer and economist

Prof.dr.sc. Rikard Lang
- Born: 22 February 1913; Vinkovci, Austro-Hungarian Monarchy, (now Croatia)
- Died: 16 September 1994 (aged 81); Zagreb, Croatia
- Education: University of Zagreb
- Children: Slobodan Lang
- Relatives: Ignjat and Terezija Lang (parents)

Rikard Lang (February 22, 1913 – September 16, 1994) was a prominent Croatian university professor, lawyer and economist.

Lang was born to a notable Jewish family, of Ignjat and Terezija Lang, in Vinkovci on February 22, 1913. His father was president of the Jewish community Vinkovci and his mother was a housewife. Lang finished elementary and high school in Vinkovci. He attended and graduated from the University of Zagreb's Faculty of Law in 1936. During his study he joined the leftist movement in Zagreb. During World War II, from 1942 to 1945, Lang joined and fought with the Partisans. Because of his language skills, Lang accompanied Tito in his meetings with Churchill in Italy as a translator. His parents were killed at the Jasenovac concentration camp during the Holocaust. After the war he was employed at the University of Zagreb's Faculty of Law as associate professor. Lang initiated the founding of the Faculty of Law Political Economy Chair at which he taught and headed from 1947. He was also the director of the Institute of Economics in Zagreb from its founding in 1954 until 1974. As the head of the Institute, he was the initiator of numerous research projects in the field of economic development, advocated market relations in the conditions of a socialist economy, and its inclusion in the global economy and the world market. Thanks to Lang, many Croatian commercial organizations were successfully engage in the global economy flows. During Croatian Spring, Lang refused to join the persecution of colleagues at the Faculty of Law, University of Zagreb.

As an author and co-author Lang has published more than 200 scientific and technical books, monographs, studies on economic policy in SFR Yugoslavia. As a member of the Yugoslav delegation, he participated in the sessions of the United Nations General Assembly, certain United Nations bodies and specialized agencies of the United Nations.

As one of the most distinguished Croatian economists of his generation, Lang received numerous state, national and international awards, honors and awards for his prolific long-term work from the highest national and international bodies. He retired in 1983. Lang died on September 16, 1994, and was buried at the Mirogoj Cemetery.

== See also ==
- Slobodan Lang
