= Maír José Benardete =

Maír José Benardete (1895, Çanakkale, Ottoman Empire – 1989, U.S.) was a scholar of Sephardic studies and was a long-time Professor of Spanish and Sephardic Studies at Brooklyn College.

He was a past Director of The Hispanic Institute at Columbia University's Sephardic Studies Section in the late 1920s. The Institute was also known as Casa Hispánica.

== Early life and education ==
Benardete was born in the Ottoman Empire, in the city of Çanakkale, on Dardanalles, Turkey. He was the eldest of nine children, and came from a Ladino (Judaeo-Spanish)-speaking family. At the age of eight, he contracted a serious illness that left him unable to walk for months. He spent his year-long convalescence among the Sephardic women of his community, absorbing the Judeo-Spanish folklore and language that would later serve him well in his career as a Sephardic scholar. In 1910, Benardete immigrated to the United States, to live with an uncle living in Cincinnati.

Benardete also went by the names Mair José Benardete; Mair José Benadrete; M. J. Benadete; Meyer Benardete; and Mercedes Benardete.

== Career ==
Under Benardete's direction, the Sephardic Section of Casa Hispanica hosted or sponsored lectures on Sephardic civilization, generated articles for the institute's "Revista Hispanica Moderna", published a Ladino/Spanish commemorative volume on the medieval Spanish-Jewish poet, Yehuda Halevi, and staged dramatic performances in Judaeo-Spanish. Benardete's doctoral dissertation, "Hispanic Culture and Character of the Sephardic Jews," was first published by the Hispanic Institute in 1953.

In 1962, two Sephardic activists, Louis N. Levy and David N. Barocas, published "Studies in Honor of M.J. Benadrete."

== Personal life ==
Benardete produced three academically-successful sons; Seth Benardete, who was an American classicist and philosopher, José Benardete, who was also a philosopher. and Diego Benardete, who is a professor of mathematics at the University of Hartford. Benardete's wife was a professor in the English department at Brooklyn College.
