= Slobodan Lang =

Croatian physician, professor, diplomat and politician

Personal details
- Born: 8 October 1945 Zagreb, PR Croatia, Yugoslavia (now Croatia)
- Died: 23 February 2016 (aged 70) Zagreb, Croatia
- Party: Democratic Centre (formerly: Croatian Democratic Union, League of Communists of Yugoslavia)
- Relations: Rikard Lang (father)
- Education: University of Zagreb
- Occupation: Physician

Slobodan Lang (8 October 1945 – 23 February 2016) was a Croatian physician, professor, diplomat, Member of Parliament, politician and Adviser for Humanitarian Issues of the first Croatian president, Franjo Tuđman.

== Background and education ==
Lang was born on 8 October 1945 in Zagreb. His father was a prominent Croatian university professor, Rikard Lang, and his mother was from the notable Sorkočević family of Dubrovnik. Lang's paternal grandfather Ignjat Lang was president of the Jewish community of Vinkovci and his grandmother Terezija was a housewife.

In 1941, a Dominican priest Hijacint Bošković, attempted to rescue the Langs from Nazi persecution. Bošković traveled from Dubrovnik to Vinkovci with a special permit that allowed him to relocate the Langs to Dubrovnik. Lang's grandfather refused to leave, saying he "was the president of Jews in peace and he will stay one in the war". Both of Lang's grandparents were killed at Jasenovac during the Holocaust.

Lang graduated from the University of Zagreb School of Medicine with a specialty in social medicine.

== Later life and career ==
From 1986 to 1990, Lang was a member of the executive council of the city of Zagreb and secretary of the secretariat of health. He co-organized the Libertas convoy in 1991 during the Croatian War of Independence to bring humanitarian aid to besieged Dubrovnik. In 1991, Lang organized a protest against the JNA in Zagreb and a protest against anti-semitism.

He was president of the Croatian Healthy Cities Network and vice president of the Croatian Association of Public Health, as well as a member of several editorial boards of medical and other journals, member of the Committee for Human Rights and Peace of Croatian Academy of Arts and Sciences, honorary member of the Croatian Red Cross and honorary member of the Croatian Helsinki Committee. Lang was President of the assembly of the Croatian-American Society. He was the author of more than 100 professional and scientific articles, and authored and co-authored several books.

Lang was a personal adviser to President Franjo Tuđman for humanitarian affairs in the period from 1993 until 2000. Lang was a member of the Zagreb Jewish community. On February 12, 2010, he was seriously injured in a car accident, but he recovered from his injuries.

In 2012, Lang criticized the statements of Croatia President Ivo Josipović when the latter addressed the Israeli Knesset in February 2012 and apologized for the crimes committed against the Jews in Croatia during World War II. Lang accused Josipović of left wing antisemitism, and of insulting Croats, Jews and Franjo Tuđman for not recognising the communist crimes of the Socialist Federal Republic of Yugoslavia against the Croats and Jews.

Lang stated: "Josipović spoke in the Knesset without truth, justice, accountability and good for Croatia, Israel and the world. President Ivo Josipović was supposed to deliver a speech in Israel about the two small nations who have shown that there are no small nations. Members of the Knesset should have heard about the pride of Croats from the man whom the Croatian people entrusted to speak about the truth and good, to present the Croatian experience of suffering, trials, persecutions and slander, with the aim of joint efforts for the good of our peoples and for the good of all mankind."

== See also ==
- Rikard Lang
