= Haim Palachi =

Chief rabbi of Smyrna (1788–1868)

Hakham Bashi Haim Palachi
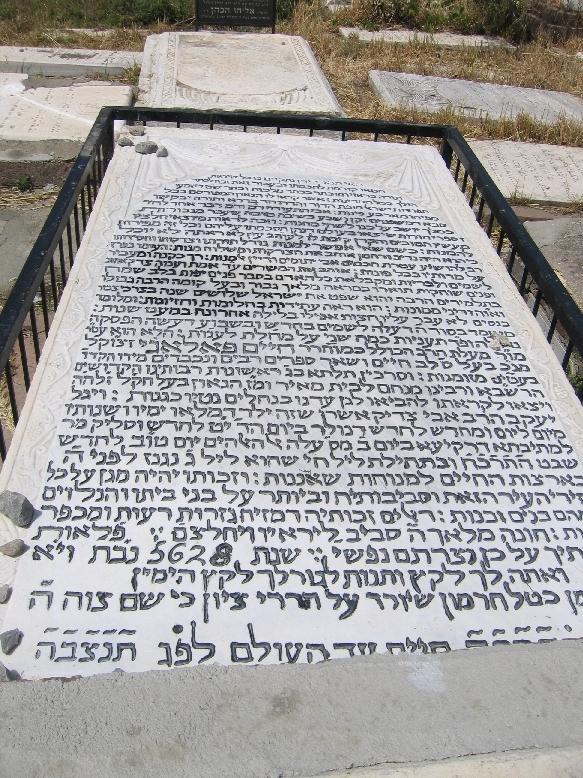
- Tomb of Haim Palachi in İzmir, Turkey
- Born: Ḥayyim ben Jacob Pallache; January 28, 1788; Smyrna (İzmir)
- Died: February 10, 1868 (aged 80) (Hebrew calendar 17 Shvat 5628); Smyrna (İzmir)
- Burial place: Bahri Baba Jewish cemetery, Izmir; relocated to Gürçeşme cemetery, 86-116 Gürçeşme Caddesi, Izmir
- Other names: alternative spellings: Haim Palacci, Ḥayyim Pallache, Hayim Palacci, Hayyim Palaggi, Chaim Palagi; also Palache, Falaji
- Years active: 1813–1868 (death)
- Era: Tanzimat period
- Notable work: Tokhahot Hayyim (Reproofs of Life)
- Spouse: Esther Palacci
- Children: Abraham, Yitzak/Isaac (Rahamim Nissim), Joseph
- Parent(s): Jacob Pallache, Kali Kaden Hazen
- Family: Pallache family
- Awards: Mecidiye Order Third Class

Haim Palachi (Hebrew: חיים פלאג'י Yiddish: חיים פאלאדזשי; Acronym: MaHaRHaF or HaVIF) (January 28, 1788– February 10, 1868) was a Jewish-Turkish chief rabbi of Smyrna (İzmir) and author in Ladino and Hebrew. His titles included Hakham Bashi and Gaon. He was the father of grand rabbis Abraham Palacci and Isaac Palacci (Rahamim Nissim Palacci) and rabbi Joseph Palacci. He was a member of the Pallache family.

(Alternative spellings include: Hayim Palachi, Hayyim Pallache, Hayyim Palache, Haim Palacci, Hayim Palacci, Hayyim Palaggi (and Falaji), Chaim Palagi, and Haim Palatchi.) He died on 17 Shevat 5628, according to the Jewish calendar. His mother's name was Kaden.

== Background ==
Pallache was born in İzmir, Turkey, then known internationally as Smyrna, part of the Ottoman Empire. His parents were Jacob Pallache (a rabbi and kabbalist) and Kali Kaden Hazan. His maternal grandfather was Joseph Raphael ben Hayyim Hazzan (1741–1820), chief rabbi of İzmir. He studied under his grandfather and also Isaac ben Elyakim Gatigno.

== Career ==
=== Early years ===
By 1813, aged 25, Palacci was already a rabbi. In 1828, aged 40, he became head of the Bet Yaakov rabbinical seminary.

In 1837 or 1838, he became head of a religious court and then became dayan (jurist), marbiš torah (teacher of Torah), and rav korel (head rabbi).

By 1854 or 1856, he had become Hakham Bashi or Chief Rabbi of Smyrna, appointed by Sultan Abdülmecid I during the Tanzimat period. He served as chief rabbi until his death in 1868.

In 1864, he received the award of the Mecidiye Order, third class.

In 1867, he received a Greek Orthodox delegation:

SMYRNA.—Interchange of Visits.—We are happy to learn that a most friendly feeling prevails at Smyrna among the ecclesiastical heads of the several religious bodies. The Greek Archbishop, accompanied by his clergy, lately went to pay a visit to the Chief Rabbi, Haim Palacci. He was received with all the honors due to his rank. The Archbishop told the rabbi that a similar visit would be paid by the Greek Patriarch of Constantinople to the Chief Rabbi of the capital. This friendly understanding was brought about by the generous act of the Jews who bought six bells carried away by the Turks from Candia and presented them to the clergy of Smyrna, with the request to restore them to the churches whence they had been carried away.

=== Murder (1859) ===
Following a murder on March 17, 1859, local police apprehended a Greek meat butcher and a Jewish broker as suspects. Rav Hayim Palaçi (as his name appears in modern Turkish) wrote to Baron Lionel de Rothschild for support and protection. He also wrote a liturgy, in which he stated "Müslüman Türkler Yahudilere inanıp güveniyorlar." ("Muslim Turks believe and rely on Jews.").

=== "Haim Palacci Dispute" ===
By 1865, attempts by secular leaders of Izmir's Jewish community to exploit Palachi's declining health led to communal conflict.

Historian D. Gershon Lewental describes the conflict as follows. In November 1865, an administrative committee forced Pallache to accept its oversight, after which a group of lay leaders purchased at reduced cost the concession for the gabelle tax on kosher food and alcohol. The concessionaires refused audit; Pallache repealed the tax completely. The concessionaires went over Pallache as Izmir's hakham bashi to the regional head (hakham bashi kayakami), whose representative conducted an investigation that recommended Pallache's removal in favor of himself (the representative). The Ottoman government accepted the recommendation. Widespread opposition to the Ottoman decision led to delay, repeal, and finally reinstitution of Pallache by October 1867. Pallache agreed to some reforms but died before they took effect.

Historian Stanford J. Shaw describes the conflict in his book The Jews of the Ottoman Empire and the Turkish Republic (1991). He recounts that Palacci was more conservative than other religious leaders during the Tanzimat period. However, the dispute started in November 1865, when other members of the Jewish religious council speculated on the gabelle (food tax) on wine, alcohol, and salt; Palacci annulled the tax. In December 1866, Yakir Geron, grand rabbi of Adrianople, intervened by sending an emissary, rabbi Samuel Danon to resolve the matter; he recommended that Geron dismiss Palacci (and appoint himself, Danon, instead). Jewish members of the Izmir community asked their vali (governor) to hold off, while they sent a mission to Istanbul. The decision that came back was to appoint Palacci as chief rabbi for life. (A longer description appeared in the French L'Histoire des Israelites de l'Empire Ottoman by Moïse Franco in 1897.)

== Personal and death ==
Palachi had three sons: Abraham, Isaac, and Joseph, all three of whom were rabbis and the first two succeeded him as grand rabbi.

He was conservative in his views and opposed innovations, e.g., adoption of European dress.

He died on February 10, 1868. "His funeral hearse was attended by all of the city's dignitaries", escorted by a battalion of troops, an honor given by the Turkish authorities to only two or three chief rabbis.

== Legacy ==
=== "Haim Palacci Dispute" ===
The Pallache dispute (above) led to a fifty-year delay in implementation of the Organic Statute of 1865 [sic – (1856?)] in Izmir, according to Shaw.

=== Succession ===
Some dispute arose over Palachi's succession. A minority in the local community championed Rabbi Joseph Hakim of Manissa to succeed. A majority wanted his son Abraham to succeed him, including Jews with foreign citizenship. Abraham succeeded his father on October 7, 1869.

The second son Isaac (Rahamim Nissim) succeeded his brother Abraham.

The third son Joseph was unable to succeed his brothers because he was too young (in this case, under the age of seventy-five).

=== Personal reputation ===
Journey into Jewish Heritage states:

Rabbi Haim Palaggi... was the 'Haham Bashi' of Izmir in the middle of the 19th century, and founder of the 'Beit Hillel' Synagogue and beit madras (study hall). He was very knowledgeable, and received letters from all over the world with questions about Halacha. He wrote 82 books addressing important issues in Jewish life. The community today is very proud of his legacy, and speak of him with great respect. In the synagogue, when his name is mentioned or cited, the congregation stands up and bows with respect.

Turkish Jews still refer to his writings and opinions in their ceremonies and writings, particularly tr:Rav İzak Alaluf in Şalom newspaper: 2015, 2011, 2010, 2009, 2008.

=== Opinions ===
His rabbinical opinions continue to receive attention worldwide today, e.g., his 1869 opinion "On the Possibilities of Synagogue Reform: An Ottoman Rabbi's Answer to a Query in Paris," reprinted in 2014.

He has been called a Gaon in memory of the Geonim, e.g., "And the Lion of the gaonim, the elderly Gaon Chaim Palaji of Izmir..." and a "19th century living Gaon."

=== Pilgrimage gravesite ===
A main attraction of Gurcesme is "the grave of Rabbi Palaggi, which was moved to this cemetery from its original burial place, in the 1920s... and people from all over the world come to pray at his grave" as "pilgrimage to Rabbi Palaggi's grave."

Journey into Jewish Heritage (Zalman Shazar Center) recommends that "Rabbi Haim Palaggi's grave should be marked as a landmark for orientation, and the building of a pergola should be considered for the visitors’ comfort."

Palacci's grave lies in Plot B.4. It is one of the graves "brought over from the old cemetery and put in between the existing graves. This is the reason why the grave is at right angles to all the rest."

=== Synagogue ===
A synagogue in Izmir is named after him (Beth Hillel Synagogue according to Shaw, Beyt Hillel Pallache according to Lewental) or his son Abraham.

According to Jewish Izmir Heritage, "In the 19th century, Rabbi Avraham Palache founded in his home a synagogue named Beit Hillel, after the philanthropist from Bucharest who supported the publication of Rabbi Palache's books. However, the name 'Avraham Palache Synagogue' was also used by the community." This synagogue forms a cluster of eight extant (from a recorded peak of 34 in the 19th century), all adjacent or in the Kemeraltı Çaršisi (Kemeraltı marketplace) in Izmir. The heritage organization states, "Izmir is the only city in the world in which an unusual cluster of synagogues bearing a typical medieval Spanish architectural style is preserved ...[and] creating an historical architectural complex unique in the world."

In its record, Journey into Jewish Heritage calls the Beit Hillel synagogue "Avraham Palaggi's synagogue" but then states that "the synagogue was founded by [the] Palaggi Family in 1840" and that Rav Avraham Palaggi "used" it. "The building had been used as a synagogue and a Beit Midrash. The synagogue has not been used since the 1960s." It concludes, "The synagogue was founded by the Palaggi family and is therefore very important."

=== Beit Hillel Yeshiva ===
Journey into Jewish Heritage states that Palacci founded the Beit Hillel Yeshiva in the middle of the 19th century. Current sources are unclear, but it is likely the same as the Beit Midrash mentioned above.

=== Bnei Brak yeshiva ===
A seminary was named in Palachi's honor in Bnei Brak, Israel.

=== Family members ===
An index for Abraham Galante's Histoire des Juifs de Torque (Jews of Turkey) includes the following details about Palacci family members:

Samuel Palacci, died 1732, "among the most ancient graves in Kuşadası cemetery"

[...]

Isaac Palacci, brother of Haim
Haim Palacci (1788–1869) ("Effendi"), chief rabbi, member of Communal Council in Istanbul, died February 9, 1869

Abraham Palacci (1809–1899), funded for Beit Hilel yeshiva 1840, chief rabbi 1869, died 1899

Salomon Palacci, eldest son of Abraham, whose candidacy for grand rabbi failed
Nissim Palacci, son of Abraham, who supported his brother Salomon for grand rabbi

Isaac Palacci, son of Haim a.k.a. Rahamim Nissim Palacci (1813–1907), grand rabbi after Haim and Abraham and author of Avot harosh [published] at Isaac Samuel Segura printing house, Izmir, 1869
Joseph Palacci (1819–1896), printed book Yosef et ehav at Mordekhai Isaac Barki printing house in Izmir, 1896

[...]

Benjamin Palacci 1890, later rabbi in Tire (a district of Izmir)
Hilel Palacci, member of Izmir communal council 1929–1933
Jacob Palacci, director of choir Choeur des Maftirim in Istanbul 19th-20th century
Nissim Palacci, helped the Jewish Hospital Istanbul in the early 20th century, member of Galata community committee 1928–1931, member Haskeuy community committee 1935–1939

(The first name "Nissim" appears with "Palacci" four times in the Galante index cited. Specifically, it names Nissim ben Abraham ben Haim and Nissim ben Isaac (ben Jacob and brother of Haim), but the other two mentions of "Nissim" have no patronymic or clear reference to other family members. The Nissim of 1928–1931 and 1935–1939 must be a third person, as the previous must have died by then. Unassigned are the details for a Nissim who was "ca. 1895: Member of First Instance Court in Izmir.")

== Works ==
Palacci began writing at the age of sixteen and wrote more than 70 or 80 religious works, published in Salonica, Istanbul, Jerusalem, and Izmir. Of these, he wrote: 7 works on the Bible, nine essays on the Talmud, 15 books of Midrash and homiletics, moral books, and 24 connected to law, acceptance, Q&A, and other subjects. Some of his works were handwritten. Many remain in print (reprinted) to this day.

Major works named in transliterated Hebrew include:

1. Tokhahot Hayyim (Reproofs of Life)
2. Collected homilies
3. Hayyim be-Yad, halachic responsa
4. Nishmat Kol Hay (Soul of Every Living Thing) (2 volumes, 1832–1837), responsa
5. Massa Hayyim or Masa Hayim (Burden of Life) (1834)–in Ladino
6. Responses on taxation (1877)
7. Arsot ha-Hayyim (Lands of the Living) (1877)
8. Qol ha-Hayyim
9. Mo'ed le-Khol Hay (Appointed Place for All Living), laws of the festivals
10. Hiqeqe Lev (Resolves of the Heart) (2 vols., Salonica, 1840–49), responsa
11. Kaf ha-Hayyim (Power of Life), halachic rulings and morals

Other works found named in transliterated Hebrew include:

1. Sefer Shoshanim Le’David (Salonica, 1815), halachic response
2. Darche Hayyim 'al Pirke Abot (Smyrna, 1821), commentary on Pirke Avot
3. Leb Hayyim (vol. i, Salonica, 1823; ii.-iii., Smyrna, 1874–90), responsa and comments on the Shulchan Aruch
4. De-Rahamim le-Hayyim
5. Semichah le-Hayyim (Salonica, 1826)
6. Tsedakah Hayyim (Smyrna, 1838)
7. Tochahat Hayyim (2 vols., ib. 1840–53), moral counsel and sermons
8. Ateret Hayyim
9. Yimmatse le-Hayyim, prayers for different needs
10. Nefesh Hayyim (ib. 1842)
11. Torah ve-Hayyim
12. Hayyim Tehillah
13. Treatises on various subjects plus eulogy of Sir Moses Montefiore with appendix "Derachav le-Mosheh" on the Damascus affair (ib. 1845)
14. Hayyim Derachav (ib. 1850)
15. Hayyim la-Roshe
16. Re'e Hayyim (3 vols., ib. 1860)
17. Hayyim ve-Shalom (Smyrna, 1862)
18. Katub le-Hayyim
19. Sippur Hayyim
20. Birkat Mordekai le-Hayyim (ib. 1868)
21. Sefer Hayyim (Salonica, 1868)
22. Ginze Hayyim (Smyrna, 1872)
23. Eine Kol Hai' (Izmir, 1878), photo)
24. Refuat Hayyim, spiritual remedies for diseases
25. Mismatch Hayyim, on significance of names

== Miscellaneous ==
Palacci's professional stamp survives in a book (see photo).

== See also ==
- Ladino
- Kemeraltı cemetery
- Pallache family
- Pallache (surname)
- Joseph Palacci (son)
- Abraham Palacci (son)
- Rahamim Nissim Palacci (son)
- Juda Lion Palache (relative)
- Charles Palache (relative)
- Samuel Pallache (ancestor)
- Joseph Pallache (ancestor)
- Moses Pallache (ancestor)
- David Pallache (ancestor)
- Isaac Pallache (ancestor)
- Samuel ha-Levi (ancestor)
- Hakham Bashi
- History of the Jews in the Ottoman Empire
- History of the Jews in Turkey

== External sources ==
Primary:

- Ben Naeh, Yaron (2010), "Pallache, Ḥayyim", in Stillman, Norman A. (ed.), Encyclopedia of Jews in the Islamic World, vol. 4, Brill, pp. 38–39
- de Vidas, Albert (24 September 1996). "The Palacci controversy, by Albert de Vidas". Los Muestros. Sefard (Institut Sephardi Europeen).

Other:

- Eckstein, Simon Aryeh Leib (1970), The Life, Work and Influence of Rabbi Chayim Palaggi on the Jewish Community in Izmir (Ph.D. dissertation), Yeshiva University
- Eckstein, Simon Aryeh Leib (1999), Toledot ha-Chabif: The Work, Life and Influence of Rabbi Hayim Palaggi (1787–1868), Chief Rabbi of Izmir, Turkey, Jerusalem: Hoṣa’at ha-Leviyyim
- Ḥasida, Yisra’el Yiṣḥaq (1961), Rabbi Ḥayyim Palaji v-sfarav: Reshima Biyo-Bibliyografit, bi-Mlo'ot Me'a Shana li-F ṭ irato, Jerusalem: Moqire Maran ha-Ḥabif
- Lewental, D Gershon (2010), "Pallache Family (Turkish Branch)", in Stillman, Norman A. (ed.), Encyclopedia of Jews in the Islamic World, vol. 4, Brill
- García-Arenal, Mercedes (2010), "Pallache Family (Moroccan Branch)", in Stillman, Norman A. (ed.), Encyclopedia of Jews in the Islamic World, vol. 4, Brill
- Ben Naeh, Yaron (2008), Jews in the Realm of the Sultans: Ottoman Jewish Society in the Seventeenth Century, Mohr Siebeck, ISBN 9783161495236
- Franco, Histoire des Israélites de l'Empire Ottoman, pp. 198–202, 245
- Hazan, Solomon, Ha-Ma'alot li-Shelomoh, s.v.
- "Rabbi Hayim Palachi (1788–1868)--Rabbi of Izmir". Ideas (Institute for Jewish Ideas and Ideals).
- FRANCO, Moïse (1897). L'Histoire des Israelites de l'Empire Ottoman depuis les origines jusqu'a nos jours. Paris: Librarie A. Durlacher. pp. 165 (grands-rabbins), 182–183 (Haïm), 193, 197–202 (Haïm Palacci dispute).
- "מחכמי איזמיר במאה ה (Hebrew: Rabbi Chaim Palagi)". Opinion – Jewish and Spiritual Studies.
- Romeu, Pilar (2006). "Masa Hayim: Una Homilía de Hayim Palachi" (PDF). Miscelánea de Estudios Árebes y Hebreos (MEAH): Revista del Dpto. De Estudios Semíticos (in Spanish). Granada: Universidad de Granada: 259–273.
