= Abraham Palacci =

Grand rabbi and author of Ottoman Smyrna

Hakham Abraham Palacci
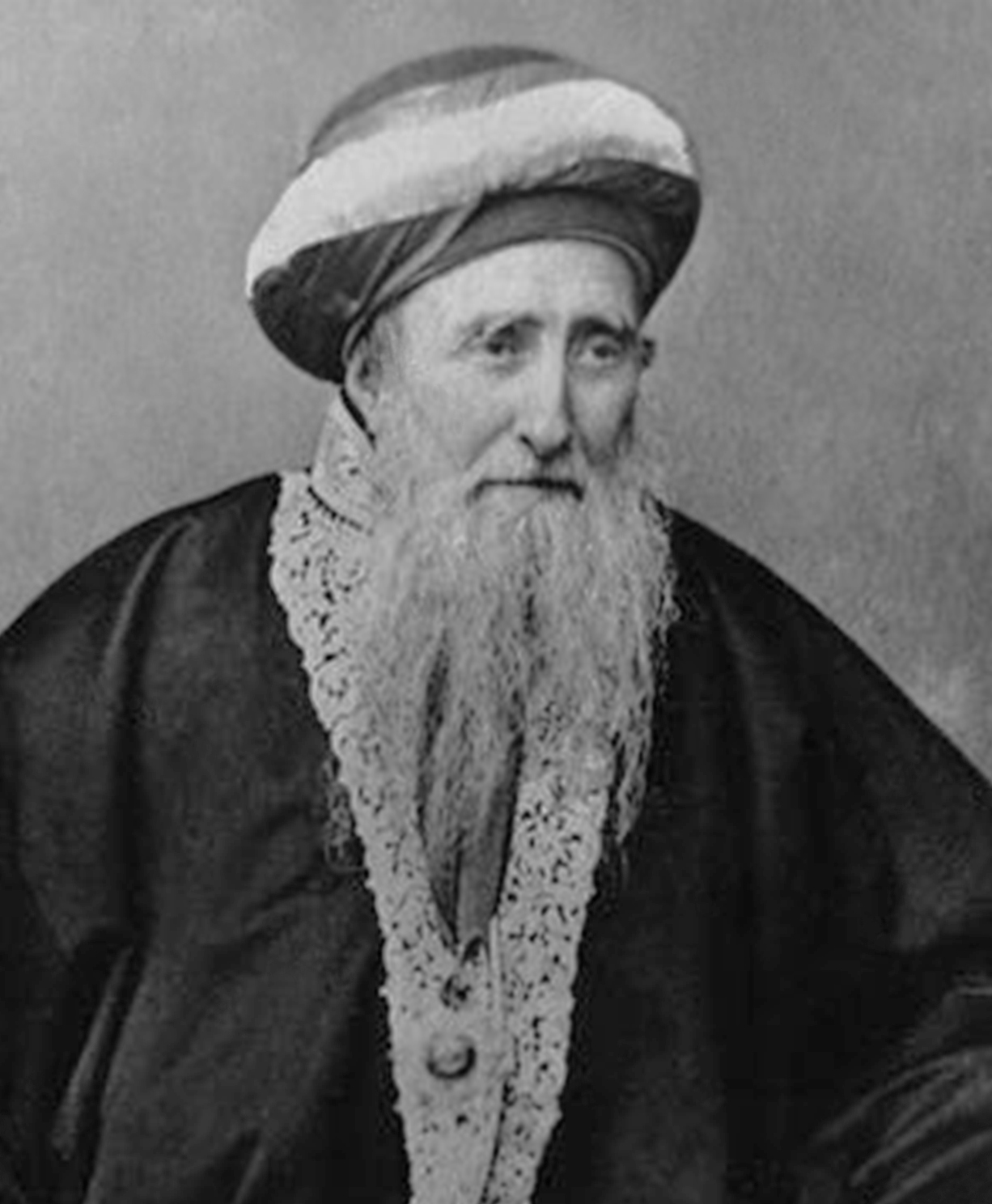
- Abraham Palacci
- Born: 1809 or 1810; Smyrna, Ottoman Empire (now İzmir)
- Died: January 2, 1899; Smyrna, Ottoman Empire
- Burial place: İzmir
- Other names: Avraham Palacci, Abraham Palaggi, Avraham Palaggi, Avraham Palagi, etc.
- Parent: Haim Palachi
- Relatives: Brothers Isaac (Rahamim Nissim Palacci) and Joseph Palacci
- Family: Pallache family
- Awards: Order of Osmaniye, Order of St. Sauveur

Abraham Palacci (1809 or 1810 – January 2, 1898) was a grand rabbi and author (in Ladino and Hebrew) of Ottoman Smyrna (now İzmir). He was the son of grand rabbi Haim Palachi and brother of grand rabbi Rahamim Nissim Palacci and rabbi Joseph Palacci. He came from the influential Pallache family.

== Life ==
Abraham Palacci was the son of Lastrolh and Haim Palacci, who was grand rabbi of İzmir before him. He studied at Beth Jacob Rabbi in İzmir. Like his father, he began writing essays at an early age. He helped his father write and print books.

Upon the death of his father in 1868, Palacci was appointed grand rabbi of İzmir, a position he held for thirty years until his death in 1898. Some dispute arose over Palacci's succession. A minority in the local community championed Rabbi Joseph Hakim of Manissa to succeed. A majority wanted son Abraham to succeed him, including Jews with foreign citizenship. Abraham succeeded his father on October 7, 1869. He promoted modern education.

In 1892, Palacci became honorary president of the İzmir city planning committee.

== Personal and death ==
Palacci married Sara. When she died he remarried. He had three sons named Solomon,Nissim and Cebrail and two daughters. Through marriage, he was related to Rabbi Moshe Hacohen of Djerba, Tunisia.

He died on January 2, 1899.

== Awards ==
- Order of Osmaniye, third class
- Order of St. Sauveur of Greece

== Legacy ==
=== Succession ===
Youngest brother Joseph Palacci was to succeed his brothers as grand rabbi but proved too young (under seventy-five) under current law. Instead, Solomon, one of Abraham's sons, was nominated to succeed. Due to Solomon's credentials (weak in scholarship, discordant in community), tension arose, and Joseph Eli (died 1906) was nominated. To end the dispute, Solomon received another position in the rabbinate and Joseph Eli succeeded briefly (1899–1900). Finally, Joseph ben Samuel Bensenior (1837–1913) succeeded as grand rabbi in December 1900.

=== Synagogue ===
A synagogue in İzmir is named after him (Beth Hillel Synagogue according to Shaw, Beyt Hillel Pallache according to Lewental) or his son Abraham.

According to Jewish İzmir Heritage, "In the 19th century, Rabbi Avraham Palache founded in his home a synagogue named Beit Hillel, after the philanthropist from Bucharest who supported the publication of Rabbi Palache's books. However, the name 'Avraham Palache Synagogue' was also used by the community." This synagogue forms a cluster of eight extant (from a recorded peak of 34 in the 19th century), all adjacent or in the Kemeraltı Çaršisi (Kemeraltı marketplace) in İzmir. The heritage organization states, "İzmir is the only city in the world in which an unusual cluster of synagogues bearing a typical medieval Spanish architectural style is preserved ...[and] creating an historical architectural complex unique in the world."

In its record, Journey into Jewish Heritage calls the Beit Hillel synagogue "Avraham Palaggi's synagogue" but then states that "the synagogue was founded by Palaggi Family in 1840" and that Rav Avraham Palaggi "used" it. "The building had been used as a synagogue and a Beit Midrash. The synagogue has not been used since 1960's." It concludes, "The synagogue was founded by the Palaggi family and is therefore very important."

== Works ==
Twenty books by Palacci remain in print; other writings burned in a great fire in İzmir (which also burned his father's manuscripts).

Like his father, Palacci put his name "Abraham" into the names of most of his books, which also use verses from Genesis in which God remembered Abraham.

- Abraham Heard, Q&A on the Shulchan Aruch Goshen Mishpat (İzmir, Av Beit)
- Named Abraham, Part A, (Abraham affairs Systems), Rashi's commentary (İzmir)
- Named Abraham, Part B, on the Safra (İzmir)
- Abraham References (İzmir)
- Abraham Selfish, Part I (İzmir)
- Abraham Selfish, Part II (İzmir)
- Abraham's Hand (İzmir)
- Abraham's Eyes (İzmir)
- Blessed Abraham (Thessaloniki)
- And Abraham Hastened (İzmir)
- Thanks to Abraham (İzmir)
- And Called Abraham (İzmir)
- Redeemed Abraham (İzmir)
- Living Will (İzmir)
- Abraham Secondly (İzmir)
- And Abraham was Old (İzmir)
- And Proved Abraham, sermons ethic (in Ladino) (Thessaloniki)
- And Joseph Abraham, written with brother Rabbi Yosef Palagi (Ladino and Hebrew) (İzmir)
- And Abraham Rose, Psalms, (İzmir)
- Then Answered Abraham, Q&A (İzmir)
- Honorable Jacob, Q&A on Jacob Akris, edited by Pallaci (İzmir)
