= Kalef Alaton =

- Born: May 14, 1940; Turkey
- Died: May 15, 1989 (aged 49)
- Occupation: Interior designer

Kalef Alaton (1940–1989) was an interior designer. Alaton is known as one of the biggest influences on the Californian residential interiors in the 1980s.

== Career ==
Born on May 14, 1940, in Turkey, Alaton intended initially to become an artist. While studying art in Paris at age 16, he switched his focus to interior design. While studying design he worked under the renowned Russian designer Oscar Mourinsky. Alaton later moved to Los Angeles, California where he quickly became a designer. He was known for giving new life to antique pieces by incorporating them into his otherwise modern designs. Alaton can best be linked to the Modernism design movement that lasted from the late 19th century to the early 20th century.

Alaton has designed interiors such as a triplex in West Hollywood that were homes to Marilyn Monroe and Frank Sinatra, as well as homes in Beverly Hills such as Simon and Serlee Beriro's residence. His specialty was residential design, and he focused on the clients' needs[5] He drew inspiration from his clients and had them thoroughly involved in the design process.

Alaton was also the mentor of interior designer Marjorie Shushan, who credits him as "the designer who changed my life. He taught me to be curious and always open to new ideas." She worked under him for 10 years before opening her own firm in New York City. Alaton was named one of the top 20 greatest designers of all time in 2010 by Architectural Digest and listed in the Interior Hall of Fame in 2014.

== Death ==
Alaton died on May 15, 1989, due to AIDS complications and is survived by his life partner Ralf Webb.
