= Joseph Palacci =

Rabbi and author

Joseph Palacci (also "Palaggi", "Palagi", and many variations) (1815–1896) was a rabbi and author in Ladino and Hebrew in Izmir and was a descendant of the Pallache family.

== Life ==
Palacci was born in Izmir in 1815, the third and youngest son of grand rabbi Haim Palachi and younger brother of grand rabbis Abraham Palacci and Rahamim Nissim Palacci.

He was to succeed his brothers as grand rabbi but proved too young (under seventy-five) under current law. Instead, Solomon, one of Abraham's sons, was nominated to succeed. Due to Solomon's credentials (weak in scholarship, discordant in community), tension arose, and Joseph Eli (died 1906) was nominated. To end the dispute, Solomon received another position in the rabbinate and Joseph Eli succeeded briefly (1899–1900). Finally, Joseph ben Samuel Bensenior (1837–1913) succeeded as grand rabbi in December 1900.

His grandfather mentions how he helped print his grandfather's books. Palacci himself also wrote books.

== Personal and death ==
Palacci died in Izmir in 1896.

== Works ==
- And Joseph Abraham with brother Abraham Palacci, in Ladino and Hebrew (Izmir)
- Brother Joseph (Izmir)

== See also ==
- Pallache (surname)
- Samuel Pallache
- Joseph Pallache
- Moses Pallache
- David Pallache
- Isaac Pallache
- Samuel ha-Levi (probably ancestor)
