= Hayyim Isaac Algazi =

Rabbi and author (died 1819)

Rabbi Hayyim Isaac Algazi
- חיים יצחק אלגאזי
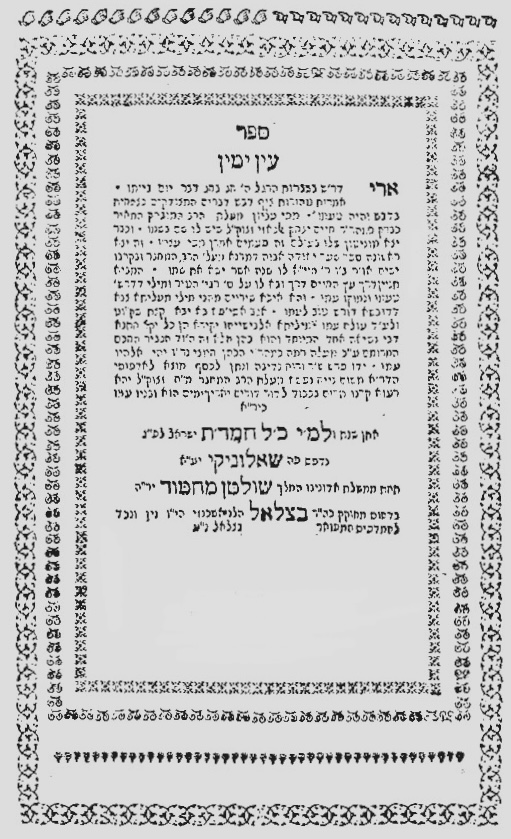
- Title page of "'En Yamin"

Personal life
- Died: 1819
- Occupation: rabbi

Religious life
- Religion: Judaism

Hayyim Isaac Algazi (Hebrew: חיים יצחק אלגאזי; died 1819) was the Chief Rabbi of Smyrna in late 18th century.

== Works ==
Algazi authored: "Derek Eẓ haḤayyim" (The Way of the Tree of Life), "'En Yamin" (The Right Eye), and "Sha'ar Yehudah" (The Gate of Judah); all published posthumously at Salonica in 1822.
