= Rahamim Nissim Palacci =

Rahamim Nissim Isaac Palacci (also "Palaggi," "Palagi," "Falaji," and many variations) (1813–1907) was a rabbi and author in Izmir, Turkey, and descendant of the Pallache family.

== Life ==
Palacci was born in Izmir, the son of grand rabbi Haim Palachi and middle brother between grand rabbi Abraham Palacci and rabbi Joseph Palacci.

He learned Torah throughout his life and wrote many books.

He served as community rabbi (ran ha-kolel) and on Izmir's rabbinical court.

He became interim grand rabbi upon the death of his older brother in 1899.

== Personal and death ==
Palacci married Rachel, daughter of rabbi Saadia "Mercado" Halevi, author of Neve Tzedek.

He died in 1907.

== Legacy ==
Youngest brother, rabbi Joseph Palacci, was to succeed him but proved too young (under seventy-five) under current law. Instead, Solomon, one of Abraham's sons, was nominated to succeed. Due to Solomon's credentials (weak in scholarship, discordant in community), tension arose, and Joseph Eli (died 1906) was nominated. To end the dispute, Solomon received another position in the rabbinate and Joseph Eli succeeded briefly (1899–1900). Finally, Joseph ben Samuel Bensenior (1837–1913) succeeded as grand rabbi in December 1900.

Both Haim and Abraham mention him in many of their books; his books often interpret their words.

== Works ==
- Avoth haRosh Volume 1 (Salonica, 1862)
- Avoth haRosh Volume 2 (Salonica, 1869)
- Avoth haRosh Volume 3 (Salonica, 1878)
- Yafeh laLev Volume 1 (Izmir, 1872)
- Yafeh laLev Volume 2 (Izmir, 1876)
- Yafeh laLev Volume 3 (Izmir, 1880)
- Yafeh laLev Volume 4 (Izmir, 1882)
- Yafeh laLev Volume 5 (Izmir, 1884)
- Yafeh laLev Volume 7 (Izmir, 1896)
- Yafeh laLev Volume 8 (Izmir, 1896)
- Yafeh laLev Volume 8 (Izmir, 1906)
- Yafeh laLev Volume 9 (Izmir, 1906)
- Beautiful Soul (Izmir)
- Beautiful Eye (Izmir)

== See also ==
- Pallache family
- Pallache (surname)
- Haim Palachi
- Abraham Palacci
- Joseph Palacci
- Juda Lion Palache
- Charles Palache
- Samuel Pallache
- Joseph Pallache
- Joseph Pallache
- Moses Pallache
- David Pallache
- Isaac Pallache
- Samuel ha-Levi
