= Seth Benardete =

American classicist and philosopher (1930–2001)

- Born: April 4, 1930; New York City, U.S.
- Died: November 14, 2001 (aged 71)
- Awards: NEH Fellowship

Education
- Education: University of Chicago
- Thesis: Achilles and Hector: The Homeric Hero (1955)
- Doctoral advisor: Leo Strauss

Philosophical work
- Era: Contemporary philosophy
- Region: Western philosophy
- School: Continental philosophy
- Institutions: The New School
- Doctoral students: Ronna Burger
- Main interests: Ancient philosophy

Seth Benardete (April 4, 1930 – November 14, 2001) was an American classicist and philosopher, long a member of the faculties of New York University and The New School. In addition to teaching positions at Harvard, Brandeis, St. John's College, Annapolis and NYU, Benardete taught Greek and Latin at the CUNY Latin/Greek Institute, and was a fellow for the National Endowment for the Humanities and the Carl Friedrich von Siemens Stiftung in Munich.

== Life and family ==
Benardete was born in Brooklyn into an academic family. His father, Maír José Benardete, was a professor of Spanish at Brooklyn College and expert on Sephardic culture. His older brother José Benardete was a noted philosopher. His younger brother Diego Benardete is a professor of mathematics at the University of Hartford. Seth was married to Jane, a professor of English at Hunter College in Manhattan; and they had two children, Ethan and Alexandra.

== Career ==
At the University of Chicago in the 1950s he was a student of Leo Strauss, along with Allan Bloom, Stanley Rosen and several others who were to go on to illustrious academic careers. Philipp Fehl was one of his fellow students and a good friend. Benardete wrote his doctoral dissertation on Homer (recently reprinted as Achilles and Hector: The Homeric Hero by St. Augustine's Press). His publications range over the spectrum of classical texts and include works on Homer, Hesiod, Herodotus, the Attic tragedians, and most especially Plato and Aristotle. While his prose is considered by some to be dense and cryptic, as a teacher he regularly impressed his students with his tremendous erudition, which was certainly not limited to classical literature, and by his willingness to take seriously the opinions and thoughts of all his students. Many consider him to be one of America's greatest classical scholars: Harvey Mansfield and Pierre Vidal-Naquet are among those who have praised his achievements.

Benardete's method of reading is described by his posture as a reader, following Strauss, in this way: the great writers in a tradition are to be treated as powerful thinkers who have complete control over what they say, how and when they said it, and what they omit. The reader thus risks fundamentally misunderstanding the text of a great author if he dissects elements of the text in such a way that they appear capable of explanation through principles of psychology, anthropology, or other methods implying that the critic has a greater depth of understanding of the text (or of the human condition) than the author. Further, each successive "great" writer in a tradition must be assumed to be fully aware and in control of the elements of the philosophical and artistic conversation that arises in the foundational texts. With this perspective Benardete was able to find threads of unity in authors whose works apparently lack cohesiveness (e.g., Herodotus). In the spirit of the continuing engagement of moderns with the classical authors, Benardete showed great respect for the various traditions of commentary (the Alexandrians, the Byzantine editors, and the German tradition of Altertumswissenschaft) in contrast to more recent trends in scholarship that sometimes tend to homogenize the thought of great writers into their cultures and to adduce bits of textual evidence to prove a point without due regard to the entirety of the text from which it is excerpted.

Among Benardete's most important works are Herodotean Inquiries (The Hague, 1969); The Being of the Beautiful: Plato’s Theaetetus, Sophist, and Statesman (Chicago, 1984); Socrates’ Second Sailing: On Plato’s Republic (Chicago, 1989); The Rhetoric and Morality of Philosophy: Plato’s Gorgias and Phaedrus (Chicago, 2009); The Tragedy and Comedy of Life: Plato’s Philebus (Chicago, 2009); The Bow and the Lyre: A Platonic Reading of the Odyssey (Lanham, MD, 1997); Plato’s Laws: The Discovery of Being (Chicago, 2000); Plato’s Symposium (with Allan Bloom, Chicago, 2001).

== Publications ==
- Herodotean inquiries (1970)
- Socrates' second sailing : on Plato's Republic (1989)
- The rhetoric of morality and philosophy (1991)
- The tragedy and comedy of life : Plato's Philebus / translated and with commentary by Seth Benardete (1993)
- On Plato's Symposium (1994)
- Sacred transgressions : a reading of Sophocles' Antigone (1999)
- Plato's "Laws" : the discovery of being (2000)
- Leo Strauss on Plato's Symposium / edited and with a foreword by Seth Benardete (2001)
- Encounters & reflections : conversations with Seth Benardete : with Robert Berman, Ronna Burger, and Michael Davis / edited by Ronna Burger (2002)

== Additional sources ==
- Burger, Ronna and Svetozar Y. Minkov, eds. 2026. Dialogue in Letters: The correspondence of Leo Strauss and Seth Bernardete, 1952-1973. Mercer University Press.
