= Üzeyir Garih =

Jewish Turkish engineer, businessman, writer and investor (1929-2001)

- Born: 1929; Istanbul, Turkey
- Died: August 25, 2001 (aged 71–72); Istanbul, Turkey
- Citizenship: Republic of Turkey
- Education: Istanbul Technical University
- Occupation: Co-founder of Alarko Holding

Üzeyir Garih (1929 – August 25, 2001) was a Jewish Turkish engineer, businessman, writer and investor.

== Early years ==
Üzeyir Garih was born in İstanbul on 28 June 1929. He graduated from Istanbul Technical University, ranking in the dean's honors list. He received his Master of Science degree in mechanical engineering in 1951. Later in 1984, Istanbul Technical University granted him with an honorary doctorate. Garih served in the Turkish Air Force as a reserve officer.

== Career ==
Being one of the best engineers in the country, he started his career at the İstanbul agency of Carrier Corporation in the field of heating, ventilation and air conditioning. In 1954, he joined İshak Alaton in founding what became Alarko Holding, for which he served as president and co-chairman until 2001. Today, Alarko is an enterprise active in six major business sectors, namely contracting, energy, industry and trade, tourism, land development and seafood products. Alarko Group employs more than 6,000 people in one of Turkey's largest construction companies, as well as organizations which carry out projects involving natural gas installations, hydro-electric and thermal power plants, hotel management and salmon farming, not only in Turkey, but also in the Middle East, Russia, and CIS countries.

Garih, as an international business leader, philosopher, and nationwide teacher, wrote more than 200 articles for various newspapers and magazines. He wrote eight books entitled My Experiences, which were bestsellers in Turkey for several years. He wrote 18 books in total. Garih was a columnist in the newspapers Akşam and in the Turkish Daily News as well as panelist in TV programs. He was one of the highest-ranked lecturers and opinion leaders among the major Turkish university circles. He gave more than 300 lectures at various universities, and was a teacher for MBA students in Yeditepe University of İstanbul. Garih was the co-founder of Alarko Educational Foundation, which provided scholarships for thousands of Turkish students. He was also a board member of AIESEC.

Garih was the founder of the Young Presidents Organization's (YPO) İstanbul Chapter. He was the president of the Turkish Developers' Association, the president of the Turkish-Belgian Business Council, and council member of the Chamber of Industry. He was a member of the World Presidents Organization (WPO) and a senior member of the Rotary Club Istanbul. Garih was also appointed as the Honorary Consul General of the Republic of the Philippines in İstanbul. He was fluent in Turkish, English, French, and Spanish.

== Death ==
Üzeyir Garih was stabbed to death next to Eyüp Cemetery, one of the oldest and largest Muslim cemeteries in Istanbul, during a visit on 25 August 2001. After a religious funeral ceremony at the Neve Shalom Synagogue, he was laid to rest at the Ulus Sephardi Jewish Cemetery.

The murderer was captured ten days later, tried and sentenced to life imprisonment. The reasons behind the killing are still debated to this day.
