= Alarko Holding =

Business conglomerate in Turkey

Alarko Holding A.Ş.
- Type: Anonim Şirket
- Traded as: BİST: ALARK
- Founded: (1954; 72 years ago)
- Founder: İshak Alaton; Üzeyir Garih
- Revenue: ▲US$2.41 billion (2023)
- Net income: ▲US$1.25 billion (2023)
- Total assets: ▲US$2.55 billion (2023)
- Total equity: ▲US$1.89 billion (2023)
- Number of employees: 8,000
- Website: http://alarko.com.tr

Alarko Holding is one of the largest business conglomerates in Turkey. It is listed on the Borsa Istanbul (BIST). It operates in various sectors, including construction, electricity generation and distribution, tourism, and real estate. It was founded by İshak Alaton and Üzeyir Garih in 1954.

== History ==
As of 2014, it operates in the fields of contracting, energy, industry, tourism, aquaculture and real estate. In addition, Alarko Education and Culture Foundation (ALEV) was established in 1986 to take part in social responsibility projects within the Holding.

== Greenhouse gas emissions ==
Climate TRACE estimates half-owned Cenal coal-fired power plant emitted over 7 million tons of the country’s total 730 million tons of greenhouse gas in 2022. So it is on the Urgewald Global Coal Exit List.

== See also ==
- List of companies of Turkey
