= Stella Aciman =

Jewish-Turkish writer

Stella Aciman (born 1953, in Istanbul) is a novelist, columnist and businesswoman from Turkey.

Stella Aciman was born in a Jewish family, in 1953 in Istanbul. In 1974, she obtained a degree in Business Administration from Istanbul University, serving as business manager for different organizations, as well as assistant music director and producer in radio stations in Istanbul.

== Writing career ==
In the early 2000s, Aciman published her first book, Bella. This one of the first novels in Turkey that addressed the issue of homosexuality as the main character, Bella, was married to a man but fell in love with another woman.

=== Moving to Northern Cyprus ===
In 2003, after her mother died, she moved to the Turkish Republic of Northern Cyprus, settling in Lefkoşa and switching the focus of her novels to the divided island and its society. That same year, she published her second book, Kırlangıçların Ömrü (The Life of a Swallow). Her third novel, Bir Masaldı Geçen Yıllar 1926-1960 (A Fairy Tale from 1926 to 1960) was published in 2006, whose plot is based on the Turkish women since Cyprus became a crown colony until its independence from the United Kingdom.

In 2011, she published her fourth novel, Orda Bir Ada Var Uzakta

She is also a regular writer for the Turkish Cypriot newspaper Yeni Düzen.

=== Works ===
- Bella (1st edition). Galata Yayıncılık, 2002, Edebiyat Roman Dizisi. ISBN 975-05-0049-0
- Kırlangıçların Ömrü. Sınırda Yaşayan Düş Yorgunları (1st edition). Karakutu Yayınları, 2003. ISBN 978-97-5865-8275
- Bir Masaldı Geçen Yıllar 1926-1960 (3rd edition). +1 Kitap, 2006. ISBN 978-97-5606-3279
- Orda Bir Ada Var Uzakta (2nd edition). Galata Yayıncılık, 2011. ISBN 978-60-5446-3091
