= Cem Stamati =

- Born: 1981 (age 44–45); Istanbul, Turkey
- Occupation: Guitarist
- Instrument: Bass guitar
- Formerly of: Sefarad

Cem Stamati (born January 21, 1981) is the bass guitar player of the Turkish band Sefarad. He was born in Istanbul and graduated in 1999 from the Jewish school in Istanbul, Ulus Özel Musevi Lisesi.

== Discography ==
- Sefarad
- Sefarad II

== See also ==
- Turkish pop music
- Music of Turkey
- List of Turkish pop music performers
