= İshak Alaton =

Turkish businessman of Jewish descent

İshak Alaton (2 September 1927 – 11 September 2016) was a Turkish businessman and investor. He is a founding partner of the Alarko group of companies.

== Biography ==
İshak Alaton was born in Istanbul in 1927. He completed his high school education respectively at Şişli Terakki High School and Saint Michel French High School and graduated in 1946. Having finished his military service in Polatlı, Ankara, he went to Sweden to work as a welder in Motala Verkstad's locomotive factory in 1951.

He was very young when the Varlık Vergisi was imposed in Turkey. He recalls: "My father was a good businessman and member of the CHP. He was someone who served his party. He did volunteer work. During Atatürk's time, he was preparing a place for himself in politics. Atatürk later passed away and İnönü replaced him. İnönü and his Prime Minister Şükrü Saracoğlu prepared that catastrophe together. He ensured that Turkey would be misrepresented. After the suffering that was endured, decisions changed and with America's support decisions changed and thousands of ruined people who had been sent into the mountains returned."

In the meantime, he attended engineering drawing courses. Having finished his courses, he continued to work as an industrial designer at the same company until 1954. The same year he returned to Turkey and founded Alarko Company together with Üzeyir Garih.

In 2001, his partner Garih was stabbed to death while visiting the grave of a Muslim mystic.

According to Forbes, his net worth was valued at $882 million in 2007.

He was the chairman of the board of Alarko Holding. Alaton died on 11 September 2016 of heart failure, aged 89.

== See also ==
- Alarko Holding
- Üzeyir Garih

== Sources ==
- Biography of İshak Alaton
- The International Leadership Symposium
- Alarko Holding official website
- "Turkey Needs a Mentality Revolution"
