= Pallache (surname) =

(Previously, this page expanded into a family history–now in separate entry: q.v. "Pallache family.")

The Pallache (see Pallache family for many spellings of name) are a Sephardic Jewish family who originated on the Iberian Peninsula, spread into diaspora in the late 15th Century into Europe and the Arab world, and have since experienced further diaspora and moved further afield.

Chronologically, members include:

- Samuel Pallache (ca. 1550–1616)
- Joseph Pallache (1560-ca.1638/1648/1657)
- Haim Palachi (1788–1868)
- Abraham Palacci (1810–1898)
- Rahamim Nissim Palacci (1813–1907)
- Joseph Palacci (1815–1896)
- Isaac Juda Palache (1858-1927)
- Charles Palache (1869–1954)
- Juda Lion Palache (1886-1944)
- Alice Palache Jones (1907–1989)
- Eddy Palacci (1931–2016)
- Judith Palache Gregory (1932-2017)
- Colette (Palacci) Rossant (b. 1932)
- Alberto Palatchi, Spanish billionaire (b. 1949)
- Gabriel Palatchi

== See also ==
- Pallache family
- Cicurel family
- Moïse Lévy de Benzion
- Rossant (surname)
