= Charles Palache =

American mineralogist (1869–1954)

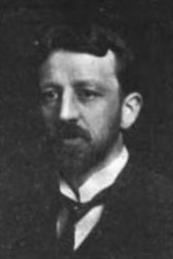
- Born: July 18, 1869; San Francisco, U.S.
- Died: December 5, 1954 (aged 85); Charlottesville, Virginia
- Education: University of California, Berkeley, 1895
- Occupations: Mineralogist, crystallographer
- Spouse: Helen Markham
- Children: 3
- Awards: Roebling Medal
- Scientific career
- Fields: Mineralogy, crystallography

Charles Palache (July 18, 1869 – December 5, 1954) was an American mineralogist and crystallographer. In his time, he was one of the most important mineralogists in the United States.

== Background ==
The expulsions of Jews in Europe (1100–1600) included Palache's Pallache family forebears.

Charles Palache came from the Pallache family of Sephardic Jews. His grandfather, John Palache, had a plantation in Jamaica. His father, James Palache, was born in New York and moved to San Francisco as a merchant. His mother was Helen Whitney. His memorial at the National Academy of Sciences reports:

For political reasons he [John Palache] abandoned that home in 1834, and put his wife and three daughters on a ship sailing for New York, but he died before he could follow them on the next boat. Three months later Charles Palache's father, James, was born in New York City. At the age of fifteen, James acted as cabin boy on a schooner rounding Cape Horn and in 1849 landed in San Francisco, his home henceforth.

Palache attended Berkeley High School. He became interested early on in natural history. In 1887 he began studies in mining at the University of California, Berkeley. He received his B.S. in 1891 and a doctorate in Mining in 1894 after studying under Andrew C. Lawson.

He mapped geologically the territory of the San Francisco Peninsula and from Berkeley and began to be interested in mineralogy. In 1894 he went to study in Germany under Ferdinand Zirkel in Leipzig and Ernst Weinschenk in Munich. In Heidelberg, he worked with mineralogists Harry Rosenbusch and Alfred Osann and crystallographer Victor Mordechai Goldschmidt.

== Career ==
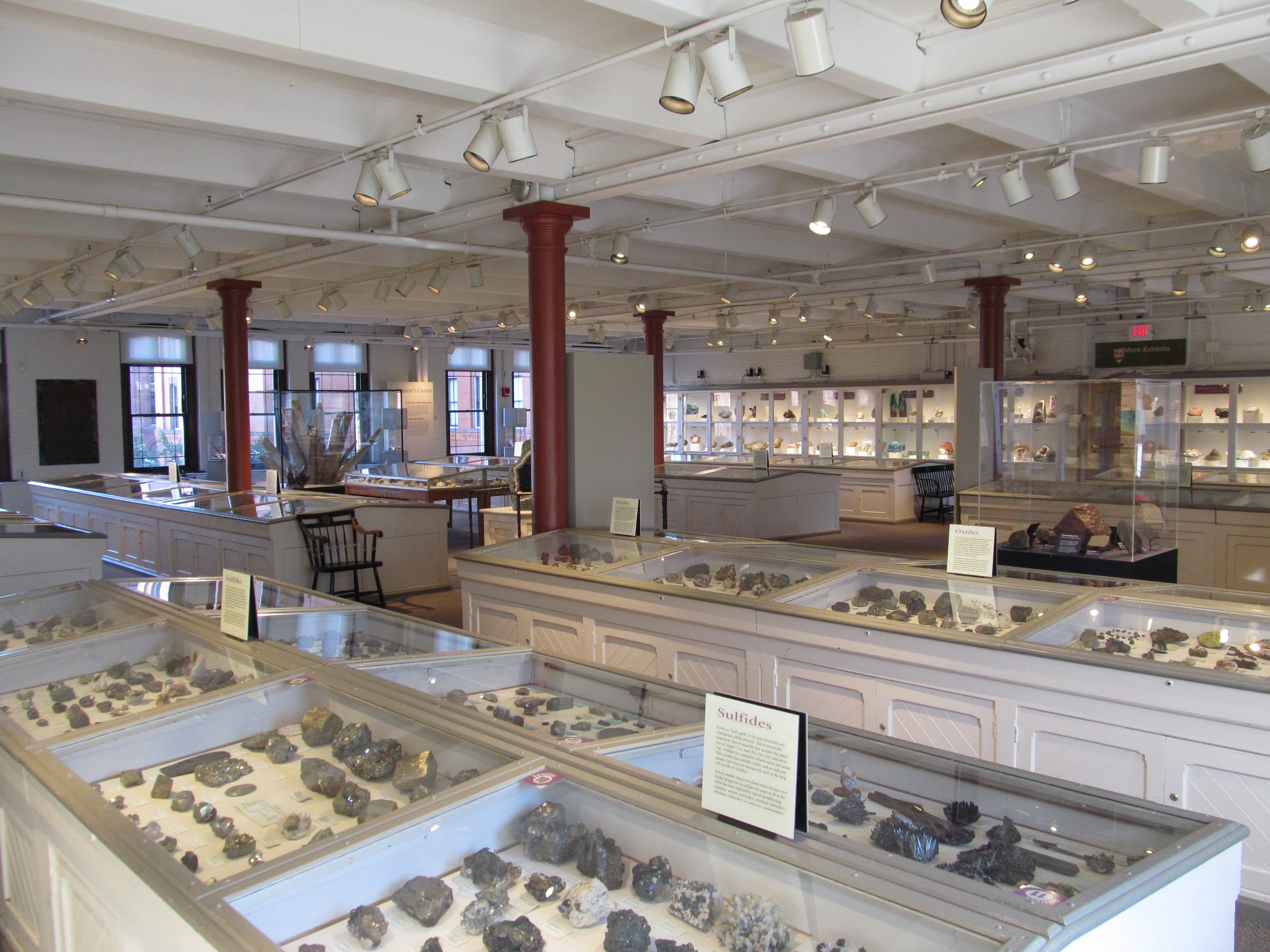
As of 1922, Palache ran the Harvard Mineralogical Museum.

In autumn 1895, Palache returned to California. In 1896, he became assistant to John E. Wolff at Harvard University. He became an instructor in mineralogy, promoted to assistant professor in 1902 and professor in 1910.

When Wolff retired in 1922, he took over his professorship, faculty, Harvard Mineralogical Laboratory, and Harvard Mineralogical Museum.

In 1941, Palache retired.

=== Fields ===
Palache mainly dealt with crystallography, the geometric form of crystals. At Harvard, Martin A. Peacock and Harry Berman (who introduced X-ray crystallographic methods) were important assistants. In 1944 with Berman and Clifford Frondel, he produced the 7th edition of Dana's System of Mineralogy.

=== Associations ===
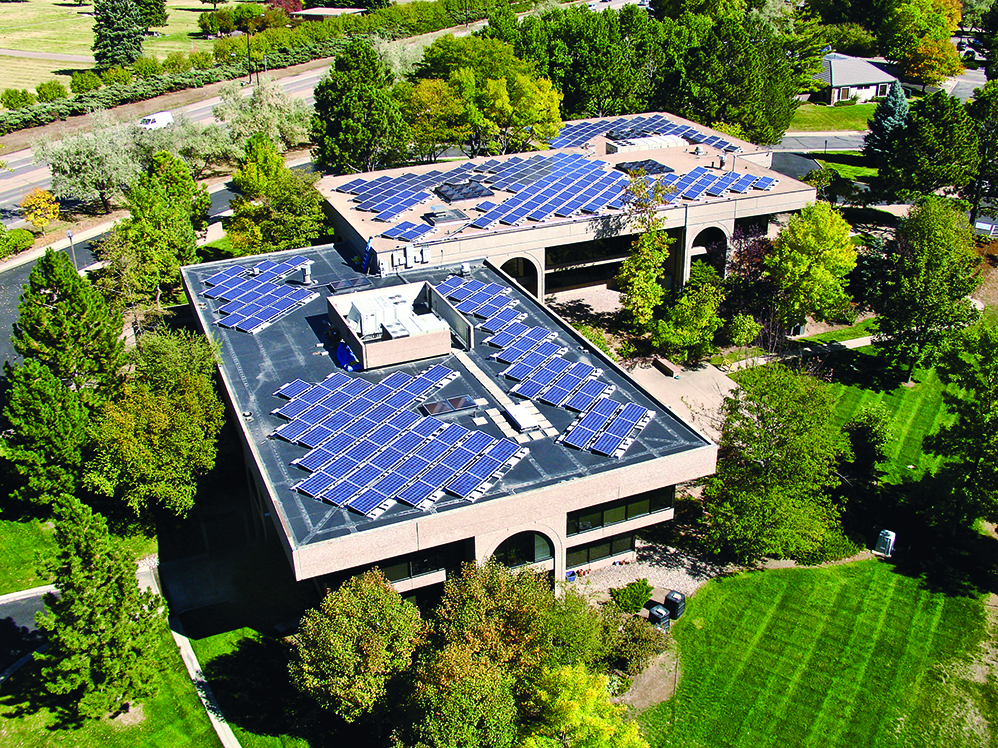
In the 1930s, Palache served as president of the Geological Society of America (shown here, building in Boulder, Colorado in 2013).

In 1921, Palache served as president of the Mineralogical Society of America and again in 1950 as honorary president. In 1937, he served as president of the Geological Society of America. He was a member of the National Academy of Sciences and the American Academy of Arts and Sciences (1903). He was also an honorary member of the Mineralogical Society of Great Britain, the New York Academy of Sciences, and the Belgian Geological Society.

== Personal and death ==
On August 15, 1899, Palache married Helen Markham, "who had traveled from her home in Green Bay, Wisconsin, to California in a caravan of seven covered wagons." They had three daughters: Jeannette Palache Barker (teacher), Mary Palache Gregory (architect, and Alice Palache Jones (banker). Alice was a classmate of American movie star Katharine Hepburn. His grandchildren included Judith Palache Gregory, editor of Catholic Worker and executor of the will of Dorothy Day.

Palache's brother Whitney had two sons, James and John. Both fought in World War I: James Palache died from his wounds on May 15, 1918.

Palache died on December 5, 1954, in Charlottesville, Virginia. His wife had predeceased him on October 27, 1949.

== Awards ==
- 1937 Roebling Medal
- 1941 Honorary doctorate from the University of California, Berkeley

== Works ==
=== Writings ===
Palache was co-editor of the Journal of Crystallography and the American Journal of Science.

Articles:

- "The geological congress in Russia" in American Naturalist (1897)
- "Jottings from Russia" in California Alumni Association (1897–98)
- "The Soda-rhyolite North of Berkeley" (1893)
- "On Octahedrite, Brookite and Titanite from Somerville, Massachusetts, U.S.A." in Festsch. H. Rosenbusch, Issue 12 (1906)
- "The Minerals of Franklin and Sterling Hill" in United States Geological Survey (1935)

Articles and books co-written or co-edited:

- Alaska: Geology and Paleontology with Benjamin Kendall Emerson, Frank Hall Knowlton, William Healey Dall, and Edward Oscar Ulrich (Doubleday, 1904)
- "Bradshaw Mountains Folio, Arizona" in Geologic atlas of the United States with Thomas Augustus Jaggar (U.S. Geological Survey, 1905)
- Halides, Nitrates, Borates, Carbonates, Sulfates, Phosphates, Arsenates, Tungstates, Molybdates, Etc. with James Dwight Dana, Harry Berman, Clifford Frondel, and Edward Salisbury Dana (Wiley, 1951)

Dedicated to Pallache:

- Studies in Mineralogy: Dedicated to Charles Palache (American Mineralogist, 1937)

=== Minerals associated ===
Redpath Museum holds a collection of Palache minerals.

- Charlesite
- Diaboleite
- Hardystonite
- Lawsonite
- Leucophoenicite
- Manganite
- Oxide minerals
- Perovskite
- Telluric iron
- Wad
- Wurtzite

== See also ==
- Pallache family
- Pallache (surname)
- Juda Lion Palache
- Judith Palache Gregory
- Roebling Medal

== External sources ==
- "Palache family. Papers of the Palache family, 1839-2006 (inclusive), 1895-1988 (bulk)". Harvard University. March 2006. Archived from the original on January 3, 2017.
- Daly, Reginald A. (1957). "Charles Palache, 1869—1954: A Biographical Memoir" (PDF). Washington: National Academy of Sciences.
- "Harriman Expedition Retraced: Charles Palache, 1869—1954". PBS. 2003.
