= Manuel Mota (fashion designer) =

Spanish fashion designer

Manuel Mota Cerrillo (9 July 1966 ‒ 8 January 2013) was a Spanish dress designer and creative director of Spanish fashion company, Pronovias, for 23 years.

He created dresses for some of the world's top models including Miranda Kerr from Australia, Bar Refaeli from Israel, and Doutzen Kroes from the Netherlands.

== Early life and education ==
Mota was born in Reus, Tarragona, on 9 July 1966. After initially considering architecture, he moved to Madrid to study textile design at IADE (Institución Artística de Enseñanza).

== Death and legacy ==
On 8 January 2013 Mota was found dead at his home in Sitges, Barcelona, Spain. He was 46. Various press reports have listed the cause of death as suicide, though the official cause has yet to be confirmed by Spanish authorities.

Obituaries from international wire services and Spanish media credited Mota with helping build Pronovias into a global bridal brand over more than two decades.
