= Ethnographic Museum Heidelberg =

Cultural history museum in Germany

Coordinates: 49°24′48″N 8°42′54″E

Völkerkundemuseum der J. und E. von Portheim-Stiftung (vPSt)
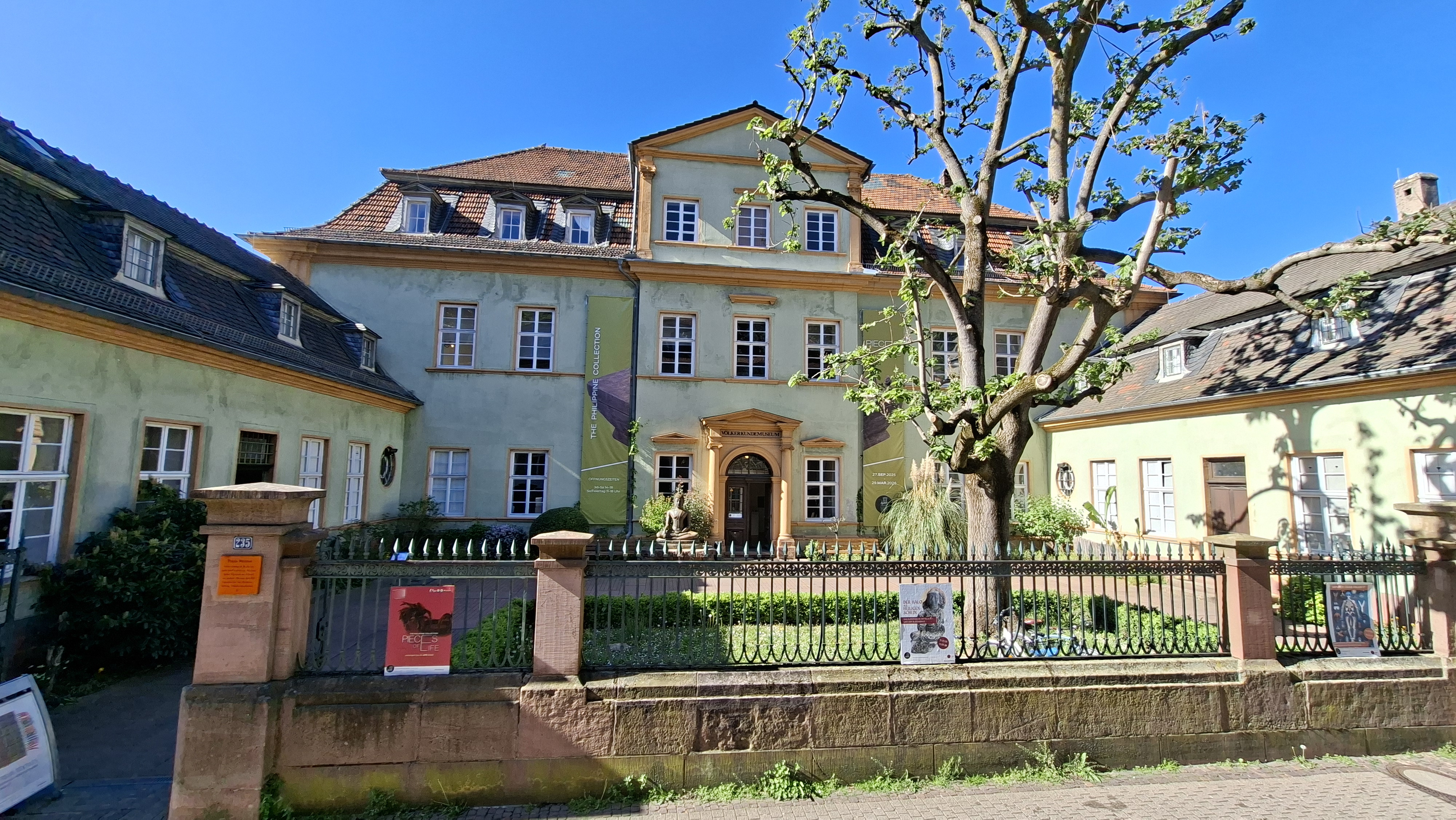
- Ethnographic Museum Heidelberg in April 2026
- Established: 1919 (opened to the public in 1929)
- Location: Hauptstraße 235, Heidelberg, Germany
- Type: Ethnography, Cultural history, Art
- Collections: primarily ethnographic collections
- Collection size: 40,000
- Visitors: 15.000 (2025)
- Founder: Victor Mordechai Goldschmidt
- Directors: Dr. Alban von Stockhausen (museum director); Dr. Friederike Elias (administrative director)
- Website: https://www.vkm-vpst.de/en/home/

The Ethnographic Museum of the J. and E. von Portheim Foundation (German: Völkerkundemuseum vPSt) is a cultural history museum located in the old town of Heidelberg, Germany. Situated in the Palais Weimar, it maintains extensive collections on daily life, art, and religion from various regions of the world. The collections are presented in both permanent and temporary special exhibitions. The museum originated as the Ethnographic Institute of the von Portheim Foundation—the only one of the foundation's institutes to survive Nazi-era expropriations. Today, it operates as an affiliated institute in close cooperation with Heidelberg University.

== History ==
The Josefine and Eduard von Portheim Foundation was established in 1919 by Victor Mordechai Goldschmidt and his wife Leontine. The foundation was dedicated to the promotion of science and the arts, mainly by establishing and maintaining scientific collections and institutes and by providing support to various cultural and scientific organizations. In the early years, several institutes were founded and accommodated across Heidelberg's old town. In 1921, the foundation acquired three additional properties: Augustinergasse 5 a/b (opposite the Studentenkarzer), the Haus zum Riesen, and the Palais Weimar, which became the home of the Ethnographic Institute. Between 1924 and 1926, the collections were accessible by appointment, before the museum opened to the general public with regular visiting hours in 1929.

=== Nazi Germany ===
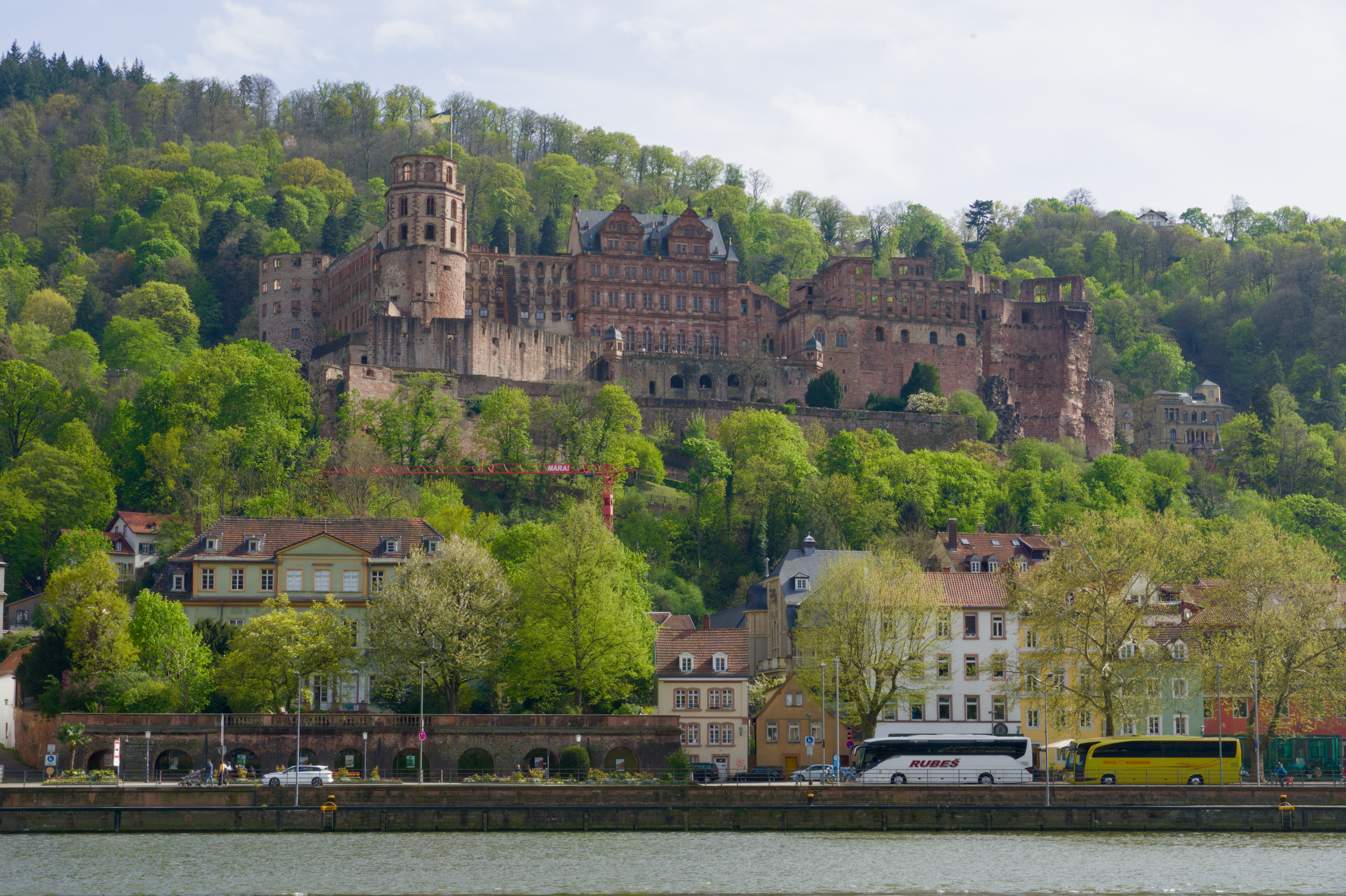
Ethnographic Museum (bottom left) as seen from the northern bank of the Neckar, with Heidelberg Castle in the background.

Following Goldschmidt's death and the Nazi seizure of power in 1933, the foundation was swiftly aryanized. Starting in 1935–1936, significant portions of the collections were liquidated, i. e., expropriated and sold or given away. The remaining institutes were dissolved, so that by 1942 only the Ethnographic Institute remained, along with a portion of its collections. To protect the artifacts from air raids, they had been moved to a purpose-built air-raid shelter beneath Palais Weimar. Due to practical considerations, their final liquidation was postponed until after the Endsieg, which ultimately saved the collections. Consequently, these surviving artifacts now constitute the core of today's museum.

=== Post-war period ===
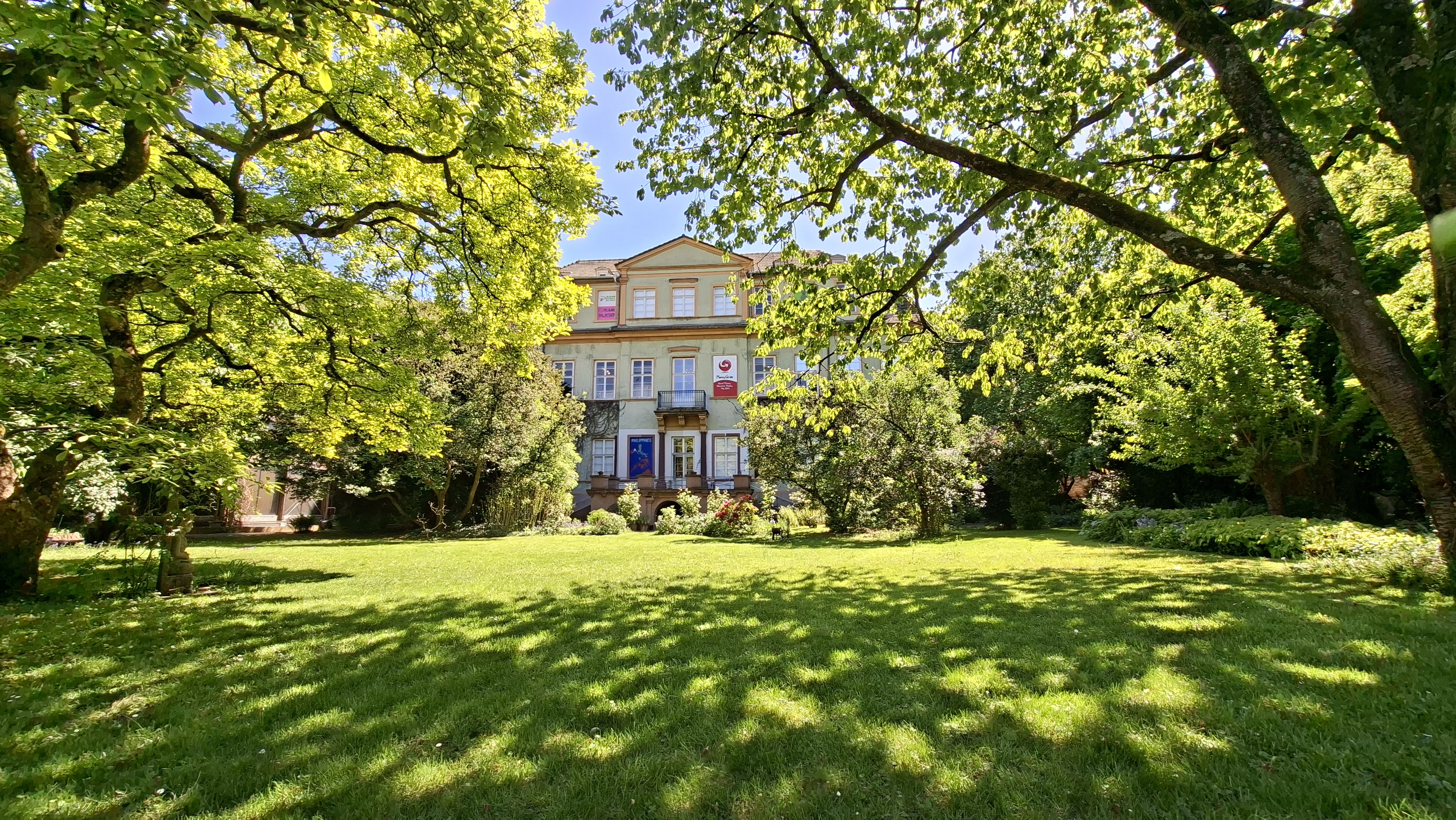
Gardens of the Ethnographic Museum

Starting in 1949, the museum presented its collections through temporary exhibitions, each focusing on a specific culture, followed by the installation of the first permanent exhibition in 1960. For a long time, however, the museum's exhibition capacity was limited, as parts of Palais Weimar were leased to Heidelberg University from 1927 to approximately 1970 to ensure the foundation's financial stability.

In 1984, a modern extension—known as Asmat House—was added to the historic museum building. Until the mid-2010s it housed a permanent exhibition on the Asmat people. In 2022, the extensive collection was transferred to the Ethnological Museum of Berlin. Today, the Asmat House is used for special exhibitions and other events.

=== Reorientation since 2023 ===
Since ethnologist and curator Alban von Stockhausen assumed directorship in 2023, the museum has undergone a comprehensive strategic realignment. His goal is to transform the historic institution into an open, participatory, and digitally connected museum that links ethnological collections with contemporary social issues, global connectivity, and cultural diversity. The reorientation focuses on reaching new audiences—particularly families, young people, and urban residents—and on a greater integration of external perspectives and innovative educational formats, such as app-based tours, participatory display areas, and AI-supported educational programs. The reorientation emphasizes the museum's self-image as a democratic place of learning and encounter that integrates historical collections into contemporary discourse and promotes media literacy and critical thinking.

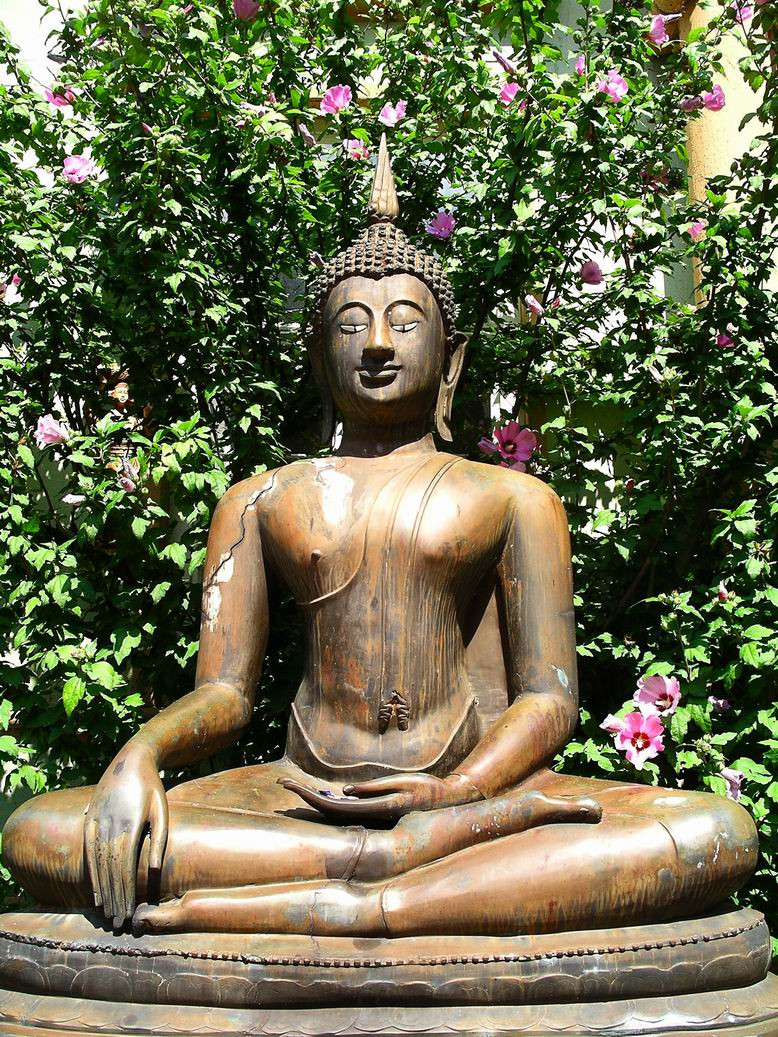
Buddha Statue at the main entrance

== Collections ==
The museum's collections comprise approximately 40,000 objects, primarily from Asia, Africa, Oceania, Central and South America, and to a lesser extent from Europe. Some items originate from the private collection of the founder, Victor Goldschmidt, while others were acquired by the foundation at a later date. Roughly one-fifth of the collections stems from donations, including contributions from Prince Rangsit Prayurasakdi, Vera Scholz von Reitzenstein, Richard Thunwald, and the descendants of Otto Bütschli, among others. Because for many of the early donations, however, no information has survived regarding the previous owners or the provenance of the artifacts, the museum is actively conducting provenance research today. Furthermore, a significant portion of the collections, which were expropriated during the Aryanization process, are still considered lost to this day. The prehistoric collection has been on permanent loan to Heidelberg University since 1934. The collections as a whole are considered to be of extraordinary cultural and historical value.

== Directors ==
- 1955(?)–1969: Dr. Ferdinand Herrmann
- 1969–1999: Walter Böhning
- 2000–2022: Dr. Margareta Pavaloi
- since 2023: Dr. Alban von Stockhausen
