= Gabriel Palatchi =

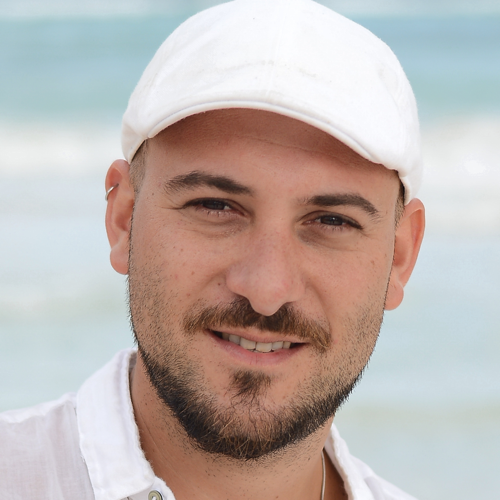
- Born: August 3, 1982 (age 44); Buenos Aires, Argentina
- Education: Conservatorio Superior de Música Manuel de Falla
- Known for: Pianist, composer, arranger
- Style: Latin Jazz, Tango, Funk, Klezmer
- Awards: 2015 Global Music Award
- Website: gabrielpalatchi.com

Gabriel Palatchi (born August 3, 1982) is an Argentinian pianist, music composer, and musical arranger who blends genres that include Latin jazz, tango, funk, and klezmer.

== Biography ==
=== Background ===
Palatchi was born on August 3, 1982, in Buenos Aires, Argentina. Before he was ten years old, he began playing the piano. He studied classical music at the Conservatorio Superior de Música Manuel de Falla in Buenos Aires and obtained a high school degree in Musical Production. In 2008, he obtained a degree in Music from the Escuela de Música Contemporánea (EMC), affiliated with the Berklee College of Music, in genres including Blues, Tango, Jazz, and Latin Jazz. He then went to Cuba and studied with pianist Chucho Valdez, which he called an "encuentro spiritual (spiritual encounter)." He traveled and performed for the next year, mostly in Mexico and Canada.

=== Career ===
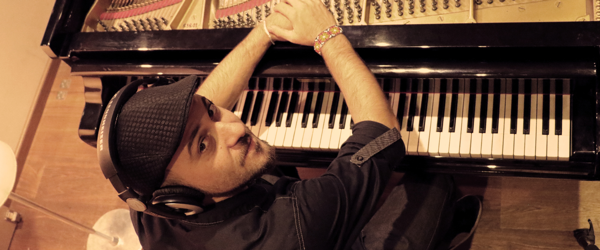
Gabriel Palatchi at the keys

Palatchi did a stint in Buenos Aires with the Brizuela Mendez group, led by Gody Corominas, and then started out on his own.

In 2010, Palatchi released his first album, a solo effort called Diario de Viaje (Travel Diary), chosen as one of the best Latin Jazz CD’s of the year by Jazz FM Toronto. Latin Jazz Net noted how the album "works the idioms and metaphors of various not-so-disparate cultures into a fine homogenous mixture that is both delightful and also quite full of surprise... a fresh look at the popular musical motifs of Argentina, Perú, Colombia, Mexico, and Cuba... The real stand-out work on this album is how Palatchi re-imagines traditional musical art forms." Ejazznews called the album an "impressive debut" and Palatchi one of the "new young lions of Latin jazz." Rolling Stone welcomed him back home in Argentina."

In 2013, he released his second album, Caja Musical (Music Box). World Music Report noted a move away from "excessive soloing" to facilitation in arrangements so that the "color of Latin America informs his music in an authentic manner."

In 2015, he released his third album Trivolution with the "Gabriel Palatchi Trio" with Jose ("Chema") Gonzalez on drums and Kerry Galloway on bass. The trio is touring Argentina, Mexico, Canada, and Europe, starting in Toronto in June 2015. By this third album, All About Jazz concluded, "revolutionary music is becoming more of the norm... ensuring this gifted musician, a unique place in the ever-changing landscape of jazz."

In 2017, Palatchi recorded Made in Canada - Live, which Latin Jazz called "viscerally exciting" performances of Palatchi's "vivid compositions."

Palatchi has performed at numerous events, including the Vancouver Jazz Festival and the Kaslo Jazz Festival.

== Discography ==
- Diario de Viaje (2010)
- Caja Musical (2013)
- Trivolution (2015)
- Made in Canada – Live (2017)
- Quarantine (2020)
- Sextet – Live (2023)
- Give Me The Beat (2024)

== Awards ==
- 2015: Global Music Awards

== Personal life ==
Palatchi is a member of the Pallache family.

Currently, he lives between Canada, Mexico, and Argentina.

== See also ==
- Chucho Valdez
- Pedro Aznar
- Rodrigo Ratier
- Stefano Palatchi
