= Alberto Palatchi =

- Born: 1949 or 1950 (age 75–76)
- Occupation: Businessman
- Known for: Founder and former owner, Pronovias.
- Spouse: Separated
- Children: 3

Alberto Palatchi (born 1949/1950) is a Spanish billionaire businessman, and the former owner of the wedding dress company Pronovias.

== Career ==
In 1964, Palatchi inherited a store from his parents. He grew the business into Pronovias, one of the largest wedding dress companies in the world.

In October 2017, Palatchi sold 90% of wedding dress company Pronovias, founded by his father in 1922, to British private equity firm BC Partners, for an estimated US$550–655 million.

As of March 2018, Forbes estimated his net worth at US$1.1 billion.

== Personal life ==
He was married to Susana Gallardo, who is now married to Manuel Valls. According to Forbes he is "separated", with three children, and lives in Madrid, Spain.
