= Juda Lion Palache =

Dutch university teacher

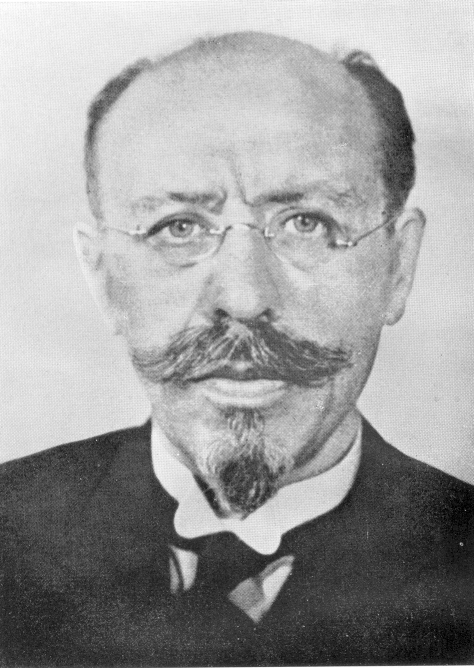
- Juda Lion Palache from Sinai en Paran (Brill 1959)
- Born: October 26, 1886; Amsterdam, Netherlands
- Died: October 18, 1944 (aged 57); Auschwitz-Birkenau, German-occupied Poland
- Education: University of Amsterdam
- Occupation: Professor
- Years active: 1911–1944
- Employer: University of Amsterdam
- Known for: studies in Semitic languages; death in Holocaust
- Children: three (only Leo Palache survived Holocaust)
- Parent: Rabbi Isaac Palache
- Family: Pallache family

Juda Lion Palache (October 26, 1886 – October 18, 1944) was a professor of Semitic languages (Hebrew, Arabic, Aramaic) at the University of Amsterdam and a leader of the Portuguese Jewish community in that city. He came from the Pallache family.

== Life ==
=== Background ===
Palache was born in Amsterdam on October 26, 1886. His father Isaac was chief rabbi of the Portuguese Sephardic community. His mother was Judith Spinoza Catella Jessurun, likely a relative of philosopher Baruch Spinoza.

His ancestors Samuel Pallache and brother Joseph Pallache arrived in the Netherlands from Morocco via Spain and France around 1608.

He first studied at the Ets-Ḥayyim rabbinical seminary. In 1914, he received a Bachelors in Semitic linguistics from the University of Amsterdam and in 1920 a doctorate also in Semitic languages from the University of Leiden. He studied under Christiaan Snouck Hurgronje.

=== Career ===
In 1911, Pallache began working as a grade school teacher of Hebrew and then a high school teacher of classical languages in The Hague.

In October 1924, he became professor of Semitic languages at the University of Amsterdam, the first Jew to hold this position. Dutch public opposition faded due to his expertise. He remained in this position through 1941.)

During these years at the University of Amsterdam, his chair served two faculties, Arts and Theology.

=== Associations ===
Palache was active in the Jewish community, particularly among the Portuguese (parmas of Portuguese Talmud Torah congregation), Spanish (again, as parmas), and French communities.

He headed the Dutch Association for Jewish Studies.

=== Personal and death ===
In 1917, Palache married Sophia Wilhelmina de Pinto; they had three children. His children's names were Mozes, Rebeca, and Isaac (Leon).

He was not Orthodox.

After Nazi Germany's occupation of Holland in 1940, he had to register as a Jew. He joined the Jewish Council of Amsterdam, infamous for its appointments by the Germans to handle Jewish affairs and send them East.

In early 1944, the whole family was deported to the Theresienstadt ghetto. Later, they were transported to Auschwitz for extermination, where on October 18, 1944, they were murdered.

== Legacy ==
Much of Palache's work on semantics went missing during World War II.

Younger son Leo Palache survived Auschwitz. He became an ardent Zionist and worked with the Dutch branch of Keren Hayesod.

Palache's university successor, M.A. Beek, said of him: Voor mijn voorganger in Amsterdam, de joodse geleerde Palache, die de gehele Biblia Hebraica uit zijn hoofd kende ("For my predecessor in Amsterdam, the Jewish scholar Palache, knew all the Biblia Hebraica from his head"). Professor Beek has been credited with the founding of the Amsterdam School, though others give that credit to Palache.

In 1991, K.A.D. Smelik dedicated his book Converting the Past to Palache.

=== Juda Palache Instituut ===
Leo Palache established the Juda Palache Instituut at the University of Amsterdam.

=== Leeser-Rosenthal/Juda Palache-lectures ===
From 2000 to 2016, the Menasseh ben Israel Institute held an annual Leeser Rosenthal/Juda Palache lecture by internationally renowned researchers in Jewish studies. The lectures occurred with the cooperation of the chair of Hebrew and Jewish studies at the University of Amsterdam (the Juda Palache Institute) and the Bibliotheca Rosenthaliana.

== Works ==
Works published in Palache's lifetime:

- Het heiligdom in de voorstelling der Semietische volken: academisch proefschrift ... Rijksuniversiteit te Leiden ... 19 januari 1920 (Leiden: Brill, 1920)
- Inleiding in den Talmoed (Introduction to the Talmud) (19803, 19542 [1922])
- Het karakter van het oud-testamentische verhaal: Rede uitgesproken bij de aanvaarding van het hoogleraarambt aan de Universiteit van Amsterdam (Amsterdam: Hertzberger, 1925; later included in Sinai en Paran, below)
- De sabbath-idee buiten het Jodendom: Voordracht gehouden in de vierde jaarvergadering van het Genootschap voor de Joodsche Wetenschap in Nederland (Joodsche volksbibliotheek 2; Amsterdam: Hertzberger, 1925)
- Kalenderhervorming (Amsterdam: Hertzberger, 1930)
- De hebreeuwsche litteratuur van den na-talmoedischen tijd tot op onze dagen in schetsen en vertalingen (Amsterdam: Hertzberger, 1935)
- Over beteekenisverandering der woorden in het Hebreeuws (Semietisch) en andere talen: Een vergelijkende studie (Amsterdam: Hertzberger, 1939)

Posthumously published works:

- Sinai en Paran. Opera minora van wijlen Dr. J.L. Palache, edited by M. Reizel (Leiden: Brill, 1959)
- Semantic notes on the Hebrew lexicon (Leiden: Brill, 1959)

== See also ==
- Ladino language
- Semitic languages
- University of Amsterdam
- University of Leiden
- Holocaust
- Sephardi Jews
- History of the Jews in the Netherlands
- Pallache family
- Haim Palachi
- Abraham Palacci
- Rahamim Nissim Palacci
- Joseph Palacci
- Samuel Pallache
- Samuel ha-Levi
- Pallache (surname)

== External sources ==
- "Prof.Dr. Juda Lion Palache". Biography Portal of the Netherlands.
- "Juda Lion Palache". OCLC WorldCat.
- "J.L. Palache (1866–1944)". Werk in Uitvoering: Franz Neumann (1916–1993). 25 September 2016.
- M.A. Beek, "Life Message about the author", in: JL Palache, Introduction to the Talmud (1980 3 1954 2 [1922]), IX-XIV
- M. Reizel, "Introduction", in M. Reizel (ed.), in Sinai and Paran (Leiden: Brill, 1959), pages 9–12
- Houtman, C. (1980). Introduction to the Pentateuch. Kampen: Cook. pp. 162–163.
- A. Dicou, "Preliminarily Education in biblical Hebrew at the Municipal University of Amsterdam" in KA Deurloo & FJ Hoogewoud (ed.) Starting with the letter Beth. Drawing on Biblical Hebrew and the Hebrew Bible Dr Aleida G. van Daalen (Kampen: Cook, 1985), pages 17–26
- H.J. Franken, "JL Palache (1886-1944), professor of Semitic languages, in: J. Rose, A. Schppers & JW Wesselius (ed.) Three hundred years of oriental languages in Amsterdam. Create a collection (Amsterdam: University of Amsterdam, 1986), pages 86-90
- KAD Smelik, "Tales in the Hebrew Bible. The approach of the biblical story by Palache, Brook and his disciples" in K.A. Deurloo, BPM Hemelsoet, et al. (Eds.), Cahier 9 (Amsterdam Cahiers for exegesis and biblical theology 9 (Kampen: Cook, 1988) pages 8–21
- U.W.F. Bauer, כל הדברים האלה - All diese worte: Impulse zur Schriftauslegung aus Amsterdam. Expliziert an der Schilfmeererzählung in Exodus 13.17 to 14.31 (Europäische Hochschulschriften XXIII (Theology) 442, Frankfurt am Main [etc.]: Lang, 1991), 105-110
- C. Housman, Der Pentateuch: die Geschichte seiner Erforschung neben einer Auswertung (Contributions to Biblical Exegesis and Theology 9 (Kampen: Cook Pharos, 1994), pages 271–272
- Kessler, Voices from Amsterdam: A Modern Tradition of Reading Biblical Narrative (Atlanta: Scholars Press, 1994), pages ix–xxiv
- I.E. Zwiep, "Between Theology and Literature: Jewish Studies at the University of Amsterdam" in P.J. Knegtmans & P. Rooden (ed.), Theologians in Ondertal: Theology, religious studies, the Athenaeum Illustre and the University of Amsterdam (Zoetermeer: Meinema, 2003), pages 109–122, 113–117
- J.C. Siebert-Hommes, "The Amsterdam School" in P.J. Knegtmans & P. Rooden (ed.), Theologians in Ondertal: Theology, Religious Studies, the Athenaeum Illustre and the University of Amsterdam (Zoetermeer: Meinema, 2003), pages 177–196, 177–179
- A.W. Zwiep, Between Text and Reader. Part II: from modernity to postmodernity. A historical introduction to biblical hermeneutics (Amsterdam: VU University Press, 2013), 112
- "Palache, Jehuda Lion (Judah) 1886–1944". Jews in the Twentieth Century in the Netherlands (in Dutch). Joden in Nederland.
- "Prof. dr. JL Palache, 1886–1944". Album Academicum (University of Amsterdam).
