= Isaac Juda Palache =

Former grand rabbi of Amsterdam (1858-1929)

Hakham Isaac Juda Palache
- Born: Izak van Juda Palache; January 30, 1858; Amsterdam
- Died: December 2, 1922 (aged 64); Amsterdam
- Occupation: Grand rabbi
- Years active: 1900–1926
- Children: Juda Lion Palache
- Parent: Rabbi Isaac Palache
- Family: Pallache family

Isaac Juda Palache (Dutch: Izak van Juda Palache) (January 30, 1858 – December 2, 1926) (Hebrew calendar: 15 Siebat 5618–26 Kiesliw 5687) was grand rabbi of the Portuguese Sephardic community of Amsterdam from 1900 to 1926 and a member of the Pallache family.

== Background ==
Palache was born in Amsterdam, Netherlands, on January 30, 1858 (15 Siebat 5618). Orphaned at age eight years old, he went to the Portuguese-Jewish Orphanage. He showed early interest in attending the Portuguese Sephardic Jewish seminary. There he studied under rabbis A. v. J. Vaz Dias, D. Lopes Cardozo, E. Beneditty, A.D. Delaville. Later, he studied under the grand rabbi Abraham van Loen. He also studied mathematics.

== Career ==
In 1884, age 24, Pallache was appointed aspiring rabbi and in 1885 rabbi to the Portuguese Sephardic Jewish congregation in Amsterdam. In 1888, when his teacher Van Loen was appointed Chief Rabbi in Groningen, he followed him as rector of its Portuguese Jewish seminary "Ets Haïm." In 1890, he was appointed Chief Rabbi of the Portuguese Sephardic Jewish congregation of Amsterdam.

== Personal and death ==
His son was professor Juda Lion Palache.

Palache died on December 2, 1926 (Hebrew calendar 26 Kiesliw 5687).

== Legacy ==
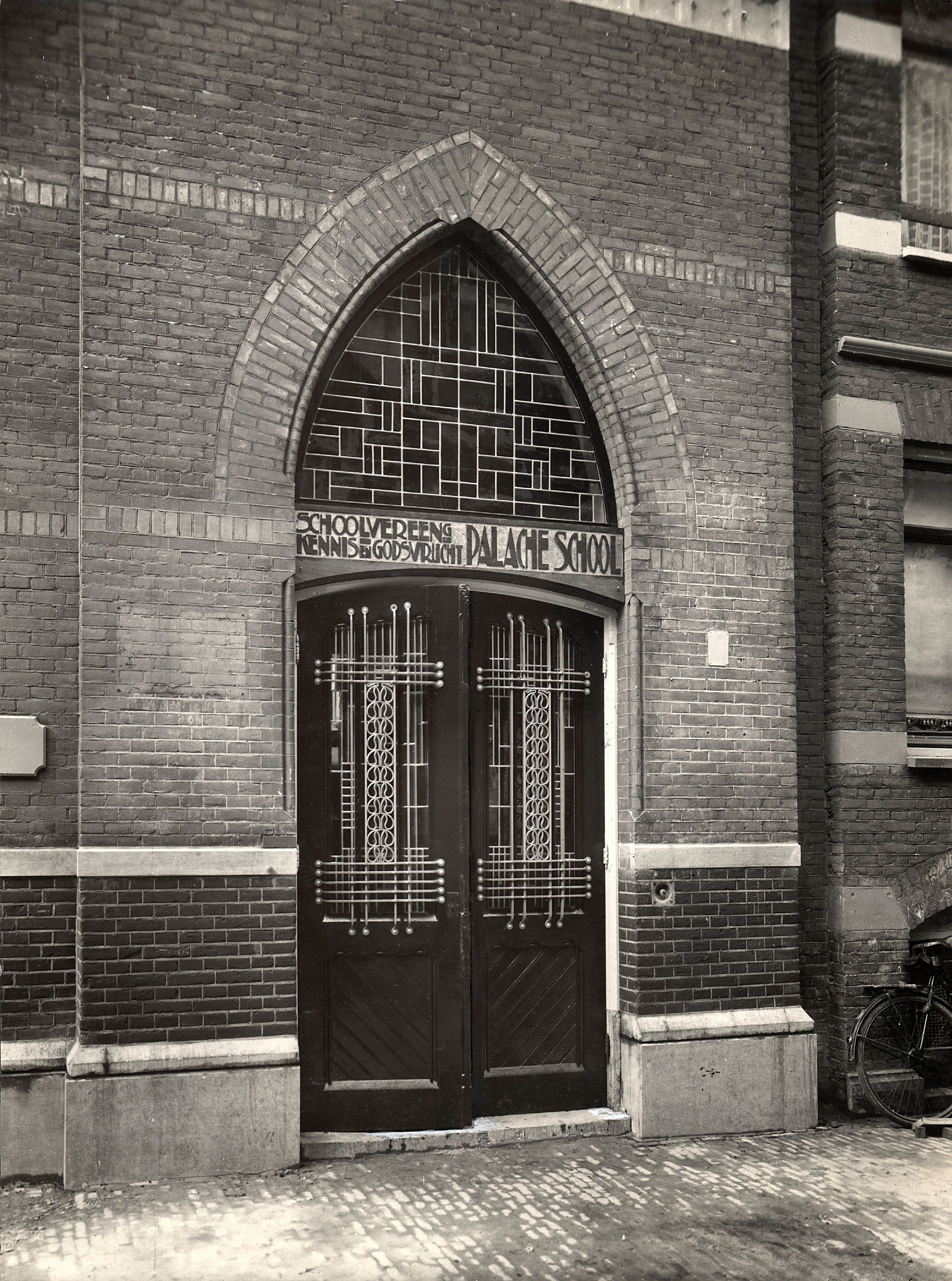
Entrance to the Palache School

In 1929, the Kennis en Godsvrucht (Knowledge and Goodness) Association opened the Palache School as a primary school in Amsterdam, which it named after grand rabbi Isaac Juda Palache. It was one of three Jewish elementary schools there before World War II. Later, it was renamed Brugmaschool. Today, it is an apartment building.

== See also ==
- Juda Lion Palache
- Pallache family
- Pallache (surname)

== External sources ==
- Bijdragen en Mededeelingen van het Genootschap voor de Joodsche Wetenschap in Nederland: Gevestigd te Amsterdam. Menno Hertzberger. 1928. pp. 25–27.
