= Moïse Lévy de Benzion =

Egyptian art and antiquities collector (1873–1943)

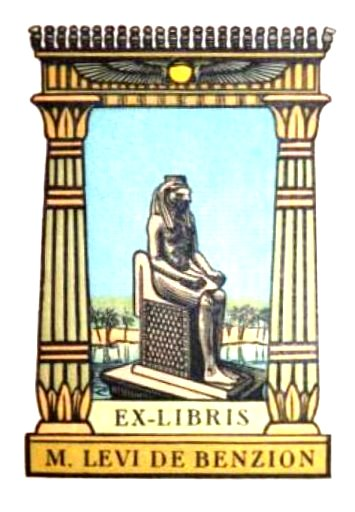
A bookplate of Moïse Lévy de Benzion, c. 1924

Examples of artworks which the Nazis looted from the Benzion collection

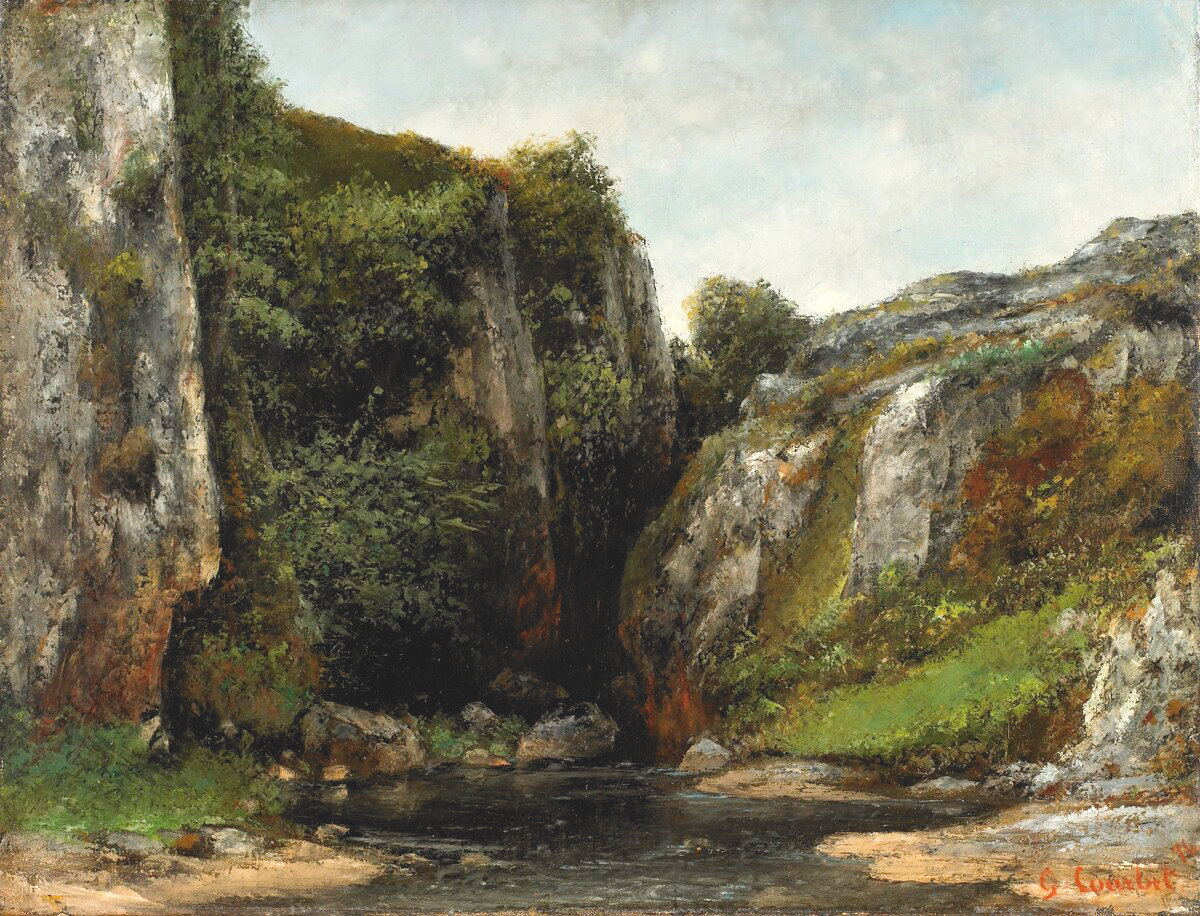
Gustave Courbet, Entree d'un Gave, 1876.

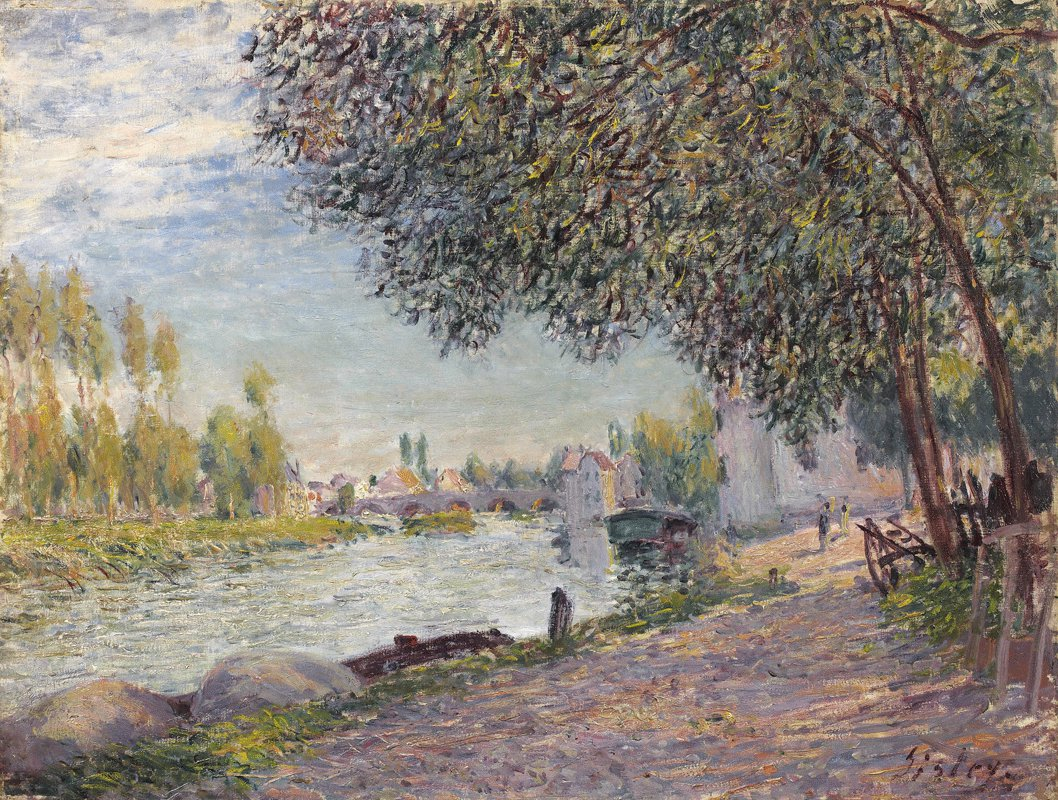
Alfred Sisley, The Port of Moret-sur-Loing, 1884.

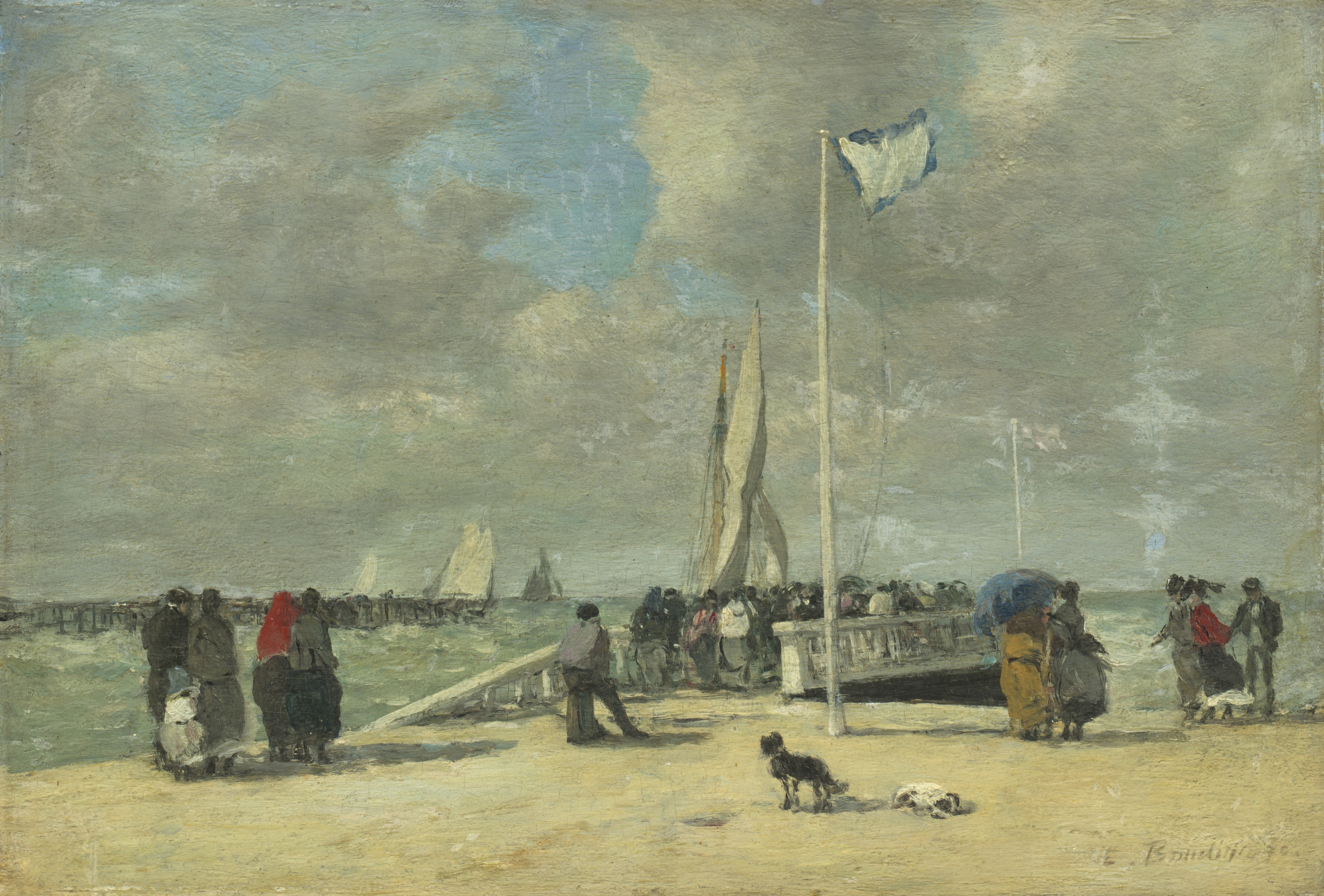
Eugène Boudin, On the Jetty, 1869–70.

Moïse Lévy de Benzion (1873–1943) was an Egyptian department store owner who built an important collection of art and antiquities. The collection was plundered by the Nazis in France during the Second World War and nearly 1000 items seized.

== Egypt ==
Lévy de Benzion was a Sephardi Jew born in Alexandria, Egypt, in 1873. He inherited a family business started in 1857 which he expanded to include the Grands Magasins Benzion department store and other buildings in Cairo. As a collector, Lévy de Benzion's acquisitions included Chinese and oriental art, textiles, carpets, books, and an important collection of Egyptian antiquities. His Egyptian items included fragments from the lost tomb of Nebamun, and one of the earliest known glass portraits, believed to depict Amenhotep II.

== Nazi persecution in France ==
During the Second World War, Lévy de Benzion's collections in Paris and the chateau "La Folie" in Draviel were extensively looted by units of the Einsatzstab Reichsleiter Rosenberg (ERR), the Nazi unit charged with following behind invading German troops and identifying and seizing works of art from occupied countries. Records of the ERR indicate that 989 items were seized from the Lévy de Benzion collection alone.

Typical of the handling of the looted paintings was Gustave Courbet's Entree d'un Gave (1876). Lévy de Benzion acquired the painting in 1919; the ERR seized it in 1940 and moved it to the Neuschwanstein castle. In 1941 it was acquired by Walter Hofer for the Hermann Göring collection. Göring, however, was not interested in modern art, preferring Old Master paintings instead, and the work was among a number of modern paintings subsequently exchanged for older works selected from Theodor Fischer's Galerie Fischer in Lucerne. Fischer sold the painting to Willi Raeber of Basel, who in turn sold it to Galerie Rosengart of Lucerne, who sold it to Arthur Stoll. After the war, the painting was claimed by Paule-Juliette Levi de Benzion of Cairo and restituted to her in 1948. After changing hands several more times, it was sold to the Birmingham Museum of Art in Alabama in 1999. Alfred Sisley's Summer at Bougival was seized by Göring's agent Walter Hofer at the ERR, then traded to Fischer, who sold it to Emil Georg Bührle in 1942. After the war, Bührle was obliged to restitute the Nazi-looted painting to the estate of Moïse Lévi de Benzion on 15 December 1948, however two years later he repurchased the Sisley from de Benzion's widow.

Among the other works seized and later returned were paintings by Eugène Boudin, Jean-Baptiste-Camille Corot, Charles Cottet, Charles Daubigny, Claude Monet, Alfred Sisley, and Vincent van Gogh.

== Death ==
Lévy de Benzion was arrested by the Nazis in France and died in September 1943. His collection was sold at auction at Villa Benzion, 6 Rue El Amir Omar, Zamalek, Cairo, in March 1947 in a sale of over 900 lots. Villa Benzion was in a part of Zamalek where several other department-store owners lived, but like many other large private houses in the area, it no longer exists.

== See also ==
- Sephardi Jews
- History of the Jews in Egypt
- History of the Jews in France
- Pallache family
- Pallache (surname)
