= Alban von Stockhausen =

German ethnologist and museum director (born 1978)

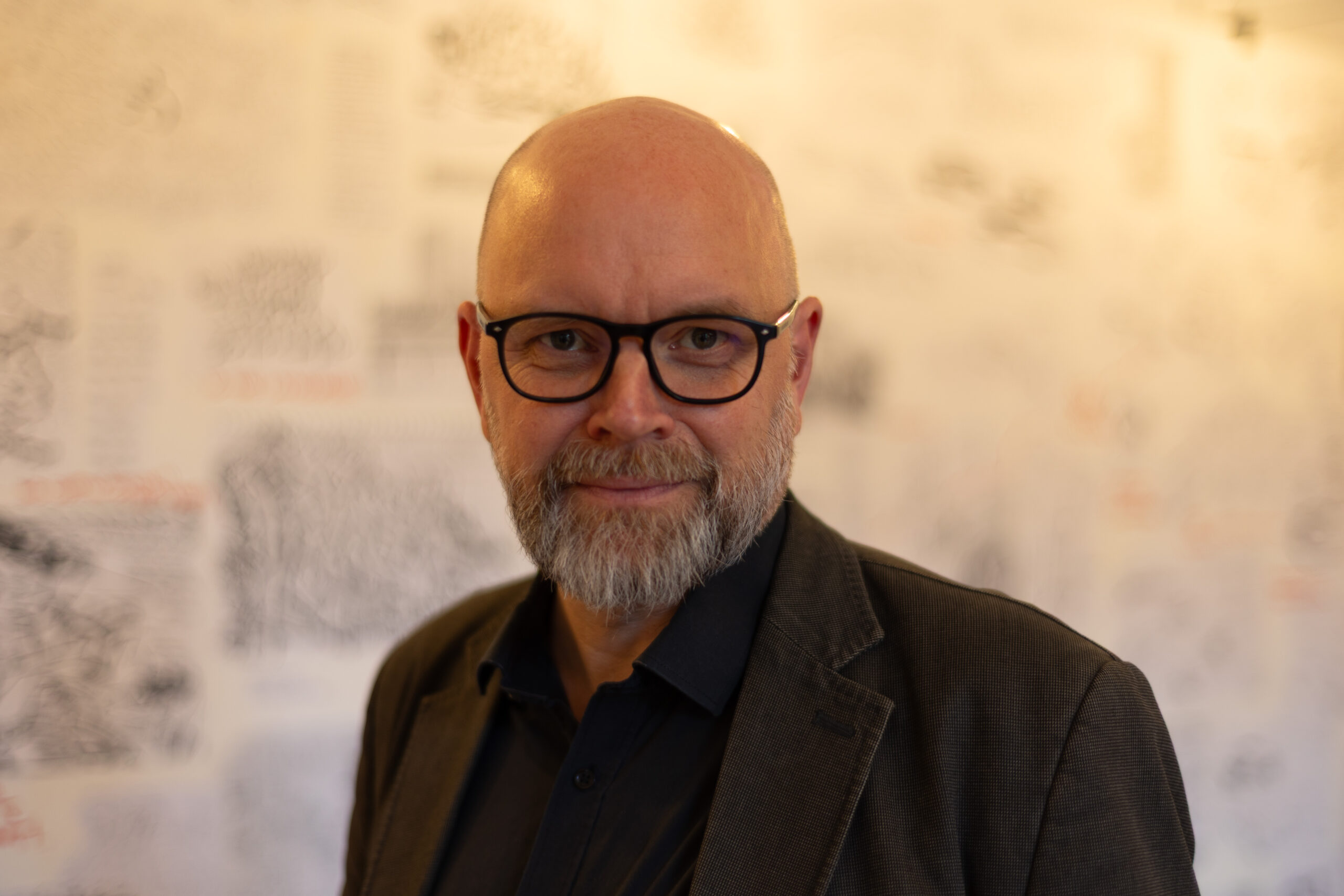

Alban Ada von Stockhausen (born 1978) is a German ethnologist and museum curator. Since 2023, he has been Director of the Ethnographic Museum Heidelberg (Völkerkundemuseum vPSt).

From 1999 to 2007, von Stockhausen studied ethnology, comparative religious studies, and East Asian art history at the University of Zurich, where he received his doctorate with the dissertation Imag(in)ing Naga: The pictorial Ethnography of Hans-Eberhard Kauffmann and Christoph von Fürer-Haimendorf. He is married to ethnologist Marion Wettstein.

As part of various research projects, von Stockhausen spent several years in Northeast India and Nepal, researching local identities, mythologies, and ritual practices, as well as historical photography and museum collections. His research is of major importance for the understanding of Naga culture and history because, through critical contextualization of historical photographs, it provides detailed insights into the social organization, material culture, everyday life, and colonial representations of the Naga people in the 1930s, while also demonstrating how ethnographic imagery actively shaped their Western perceptions. He has curated numerous international exhibitions and has been active in academic teaching, particularly at the universities of Vienna, Zurich, Bern, and London. From 2015 to 2022, he served as Curator of Ethnography at the Bern Historical Museum.

In January 2023, von Stockhausen succeeded Dr. Margareta Pavaloi as the director of the Ethnographic Museum Heidelberg. Since taking office, he has been instrumental in the museum's conceptual and structural realignment, progressively transforming the institution from a traditional cultural history museum into a participatory, digitally oriented museum. His approach utilizes innovative educational concepts linking ethnological collections with contemporary social debates, cultural diversity, and technological advancements like artificial intelligence. A central focus of his work is the democratization of museum's interpretative authority through participatory formats, the expansion of the museum's audience, and the positioning of the institution as a socially relevant space for education and exchange. Through these initiatives he aims to strengthen the museum's public profile and make its culturally and historically significant collections accessible to a wider public.

== Selected works ==
- Marion Wettstein, Alban von Stockhausen, Martin Gaenszle (2024-05-01), "Increasing Materiality and Emerging Concepts of Ethnic Religious Identity: The Case of 'Kirat Religion' in Nepal", Asiatische Studien - Études Asiatiques, vol. 78, no. 2, pp. 387–408, doi:10.1515/asia-2024-0001, ISSN 2235-5871
- Marion Wettstein, Alban von Stockhausen (2022-08-01), "Ethnographic Comparison and Prehistory? A Comparison of the Chamdam Status Rituals among the Dumi Rai of Eastern Nepal and the Feasts of Merit among the Ao Naga of Northeast India", Ethnolinguistic Prehistory of the Eastern Himalaya, BRILL, pp. 88–128, doi:10.1163/9789004518049_005, ISBN 978-90-04-51804-9
- Alban von Stockhausen (2021), "Negotiating the Visibility of 'Habitus' of 'the Nagas' and their Photographers", Materiality and Visuality in North East India, Singapore: Springer Singapore, pp. 3–22, doi:10.1007/978-981-16-1970-0_1, ISBN 978-981-16-1969-4
- Alban von Stockhausen (2019-06-30), "Naga: Lineages of a Term", Landscape, Culture, and Belonging (1 ed.), Cambridge University Press, pp. 131–150, doi:10.1017/9781108686716.007, ISBN 978-1-108-48129-8
- Alban von Stockhausen (2019), ""Our aim ist to perform something that remains after we are gone". The Oriental Collection Henri Moser Charlottenfels at Bernisches Historisches Museum", in Francine Giese, Mercedes Volait, Ariane Varela Braga (ed.), À l'orientale: Collecting, Displaying and Appropriating Islamic Art and Architecture in the 19th and Early 20th Centuries, Arts and Archaeology of the Islamic World, 14, Brill, pp. 189–200, ISBN 978-90-04-41085-5
- Alban von Stockhausen (2016-07-02), "Watlong, the Naga queen: negotiating local identities through narratives", Asian Ethnicity, vol. 17, no. 3, pp. 353–369, doi:10.1080/14631369.2015.1091651, ISSN 1463-1369
- Alban von Stockhausen (2014), Imag(in)ing the Nagas: the pictorial ethnography of Hans-Eberhard Kauffmann and Christoph von Fürer-Haimendorf, Stuttgart: Arnoldsche, ISBN 978-3-89790-412-5

== Selected research or exhibition projects ==
- 2021/22: Curator of the exhibition Mythos Samurai, Bern Historical Museum.
- October 2011–September 2016: PostDoctoral Researcher of the research project Ritual, Space, Mimesis among the Rai of Eastern Nepal led by Prof. Dr. Martin Gaenszle. Financed by the Austrian Science Foundation (FWF), based at the Department of South Asian, Tibetan and Buddhist Studies of the University of Vienna. Affiliated with the Center for Nepal and Asian Studies (CNAS) of Tribhuvan University, Kathmandu.
- October 2010–November 2012: Long term field research in Nepal focussing on relations between ritual and landscape among the Dumi Rai of Eastern Nepal.
- August 2012: Curator of the exhibition Postcards and Beyond: The Mukunda Bahadur Shrestha Photo Collection at the Siddartha Art Gallery, Kathmandu.
- 2006–2010: Sub-Project Leader of the research project Material Culture, Oral Tradition and Identity among the Naga of Northeast India led by Prof. Michael Oppitz. Financed by the Swiss National Science Foundation.
- May 2010: Concert and exhibition Le voce dei Naga in Onsernone in Mosogno.
- 2009/10: Project consultant of the Fürer-Haimendorf-Archiv-Digitalisierungsprojekt at the School of Oriental and African Studies, University of London.
- January–March 2009: Multimedia installation Fashion in Nagaland, as part of the exhibition Naga, a Forgotten Mountain Region Rediscovered, Museum of Cultures, Basel.
- December 2008: Multimedia installation Christmas in Nagaland as part of the exhibition Naga, a Forgotten Mountain Region Rediscovered, Museum of Cultures, Basel.
- June 2008–September 2009/February–June 2012: Co-Curator of the travelling exhibition Naga: Beads and Ashes at the Ethnographic Museum of the University of Zurich and Weltmuseum Wien.
- 2004/05: Co-Curator of the exhibition Gefässe für das Heilige – Indische Gegenstände reden von Religion at the Ethnographic Museum of the University of Zurich.
