= Rodrigo Ratier =

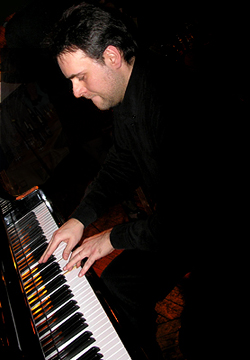
- Rodrigo Ratier in 2006

Background information
- Born: May 21, 1969 (age 57); Buenos Aires, Argentina
- Genres: Jazz, Jazz fusion, Contemporary classical music
- Occupations: Musician, composer
- Instruments: Piano, Electric Piano, Synthesizers
- Years active: 1986–present
- Website: http://rodrigoratier.scd.cl

Rodrigo Sebastian Ratier (born May 21, 1969) is an Argentine composer, arranger, conductor and pianist from Buenos Aires, Argentina. He has developed his career as an arranger and a performer in the area of the new Argentine tango, jazz, Latin jazz and classical contemporary music.

== Biography ==
=== Beginnings ===
At 6 years old he took his first piano lessons. From 1981, his musical education under Roberto Lara (guitar), Haydée Schvartz (piano) and Ani Grunwald (music theory) be continued. At the same time he studied at the “Conservatorio Municipal Manuel de Falla" and the “Antiguo Conservatorio Beethoven" conservatories in Buenos Aires. During the first years of education, he devoted himself to the study of classical guitar and piano, and developed particular interest in composition. In 1984 wrote his first pieces, as result of research on the Argentine folk music and tango, as the fusion of music genres with jazz and classical music.

=== Artistic career ===
Since 1985 he has developed as a composer, pianist, arranger and conductor. The first stage of his career took place in Argentina, where he founded the groups "Los Rodrigo Ratier Trio" (1986), "Vallegrande" (1987), "Atuel" (1991) and "La Puerta del Vino" (1994), with whom he has played at the main music venues of Buenos Aires and many other Argentine Cities.

In 1997 he settled in Santiago (Chile), where his career goes on. There he founded the trio "Sur" (Latin-American jazz fusion) and since 2006 he conducts the music group "Rodrigo Ratier Quinteto" (Tango-Jazz). They performed in several Jazz Clubs, Theatres and Jazz Festivals of Chile, Argentina and Uruguay.

Between 2004 and 2010 he participated in a register held by the Chilean singer and composer Cristina Gálvez project. Occasionally he committed as Sidemen various stars of the Chilean jazz, as Mickey Mardones, Rita Góngora and Fernando Verdugo, among others.

In 2017 he composed "Four Tango Vignettes", Tango-Concerto for Viola and String Orchestra; work commissioned by Hana-Maria Gubenko, Russian violist based in Thurgau, Switzerland, and premiered on August 20, 2018, at Campus Aula PMS, Kreuzlingen, with the composer's presence on his first European appearance. Said premiere was performed by Hana Gubenko on the soloist part, together with the Toulouse Chamber Orchestra under conduction of the Swiss composer and conductor Gilles Colliard.

== Work ==
His work explores various aspects of musical expression and exceeds genre classification. He has pieces of popular inspiration, new tangos, fusion, jazz and world music, as well has composed chamber music and orchestral pieces. The hallmark of his music is the predominance of elements of the Argentine and Latin American folk music, as well as the Argentine tango and Uruguayan Candombe.

== Discography ==
=== La Puerta del Vino ===
- ”Terra Australis” (1997, Atuel Music) Buenos Aires, Argentina

=== Sur ===
- ”Sur, Latin American Jazz-Fusion” (2006, Atuel Music) Santiago, Chile

=== Rodrigo Ratier Quintet ===
- ”Neurotango” (2008, Atuel Music) Santiago, Chile
- ”Rodrigo Ratier Quintet at SCD Bellavista Hall” (2012, Atuel Music) Santiago, Chile
- ”Resonance” (2013, Animales en la Via Music Series) Santiago, Chile

=== As sideman ===
- ”Piedra y Camino, Cristina Galvez Group” (2013, indie production) Munich, Germany
- ”Tenemos las mismas manos, Tribute to Rolando Alarcon”, with Omar Lavadie (2015, indie production) Santiago, Chile

== See also ==
- Tango
- Jazz
- Music of Argentina
