= Judith Palache Gregory =

American writer and permaculturalist

- Born: February 26, 1932; Chicago, Illinois, U.S.
- Died: January 20, 2017 (aged 84); Jaffrey, New Hampshire, U.S.
- Education: Radcliffe College (A.B.); University of Virginia (M.Ed.)
- Occupations: Writer; counselor; educator; permaculturalist
- Partner: Rosemary Poole
- Relatives: Charles Palache (grandfather), Alice Palache Jones (aunt)
- Writing career
- Years active: 1957–2017
- Period: 1939–2004
- Notable work: Major source on the life of Dorothy Day

Judith Palache Gregory (1932–2017), also known as Judith Gregory, was an American writer, counselor, educator, and permaculturalist, who served as executor for Dorothy Day after lifelong friendship that began with her editing for the Catholic Worker.

== Background ==
Judith Palache Gregory was born in Chicago, Illinois, on February 26, 1932.

Her parents were Charles O. Gregory, a labor lawyer and law professor, and Mary Palache, daughter of American mineralogist Charles Palache. Her brother was David Gregory. Her aunt was banker Alice Palache Jones.

She attended the University of Chicago Laboratory School and Putney School. She obtained an A.B. from Radcliffe College in 1955 and M.Ed. from the University of Virginia in 1962.

== Career ==
During graduate school, Gregory worked at the Putney Graduate School of Teacher Education from 1957 to 1958, Highlander Folk School in 1958, and at the Catholic Worker from 1959 to 1962. In 1959, Day recorded in Catholic Worker, "Judith Gregory is, at present, in Tennessee, working for a while with Highland Folk School, which is fighting injustice and malice and evil on the interracial front."

After completing her M.Ed., she worked at the Harvard College Bureau of Study Counsel from 1962 to 1973.

From 1960 to 1970, she served as an editor for the Catholic Worker. Ammon Hennacy noted her presence in his autobiography The Book of Ammon, writing, "When Judith Gregory was here she was interested in farming communes and co-op housing."

In her diary, Dorothy Day recorded her wish that Gregory become her executor:

To Dorothy Tully to sign will. Judith [Gregory] is responsible if Chas and I both die.
Then to lunch with Chas... Delightful day.

Day also described her:

When Judy is in the city working at St. Joseph's House, she keeps her nose buried in desk work. She sits there answering the mail, answering papers, and filing orders for books and pamphlets–and carrying on the most heated discussions on anything from religion with any of the college crowd who happen to drop in.

In 1975, she moved to Jaffrey, New Hampshire, studied permaculture with originator Bill Mollison, and co-founded Gap Mountain Permaculture Center and the Gap Mountain Land Trust.

== Personal and death ==
Gregory was a permaculturalist and eco-feminist.

She headed the Palache Family Land Trust, Inc., from 1994 until its dissolution in 2001.

She died on 20 January 2017.

== Legacy ==
Gregory's papers serve as important sources on the life of Dorothy Day. (See "Works" below for list of books that use her papers as a source.) She has confirmed Day's authority among those around her. She herself also wrote of Day:

Dorothy was not a good listener. She was impatient to be off to her own work... When... asked if she had really drunk Eugene O'Neill under the table, she said testily, "When you stay up all night you have to have something to keep you going"... Dorothy was by no means always repressive and severe. She could enjoy the comic aspect of things. In the winter of 1962, some young people started a magazine called F--- You, and composed it in the Catholic Worker office. When Dorothy discovered this, she told them to leave. They were taken in by the American Friends Service Committee, where they changed the name of the magazine to F--- Thee. When Dorothy heard about this, she laughed out loud.

Gregory was a lesbian and member of the Lesbian Alumnae of Radcliffe College. She observed:

While I was at the CW, I heard virtually no talk about sexuality of any kind... It was different in '61-'62. I don't doubt that such talk was going on then, but I didn't join in it. Bob (Steed) and I acknowledged later that we were gay. I don't know if any others did. I never talked with Dorothy about my sense of myself, my sexuality. In the mid-seventies I wrote a book that was in a way a coming-out story, and I sent a copy to Bob. I got the impression that he showed it to Dorothy, but I never knew for sure. She never spoke of it. I definitely did not feel like sending it to her directly — shy, I guess.
What led me to feel that Dorothy disliked homosexuality, that she felt an unexamined revulsion from it? I'm not sure. I heard what other people said about her feelings and views. I'm fairly sure I never heard her speak of them herself... The subject, homosexuality, which later became one of such contention, did not exist among us.

Nevertheless, she and Day remained lifelong friends–Day even made her executor of her will.

As a grandchild of Charles Palache, Gregory descended from the Sephardic Pallache family, specifically Joseph Pallache, brother of Samuel Pallache. With regards to her more immediate family, she donated a significant portion of the Palache family's papers to the Schlesinger Library at Harvard University in the 2000s. She helped create a correspondence index for the collection. She helped write about her family's years in California and in Massachusetts. The papers include her own correspondence (e.g., correspondence with Dorothy Day) from 1939 to the 1990s.

Her collected papers of family genealogy also cross-reference into other collections and genealogies, e.g., Austrian astronomer Samuel Oppenheim (1857–1928).

== Works ==
Gregory wrote:

- "Remembering Dorothy Day," America (1981)
- Women's Wages: A Key to Preserving Middle Income Jobs (1986)
- Philosophy of the Green Revolution (1991)
- "'Catholic Worker' Lessons Stayed with Me," National Catholic Reporter (1997)
- Charles Palache Gossan Minerals Lecture, edited by Vandall King, Herb Yeates, and Judith Palache Gregory (2002)
- "Homosexuality at the Catholic Worker" (2017)

She appears or contributed through her own collected papers at Harvard University to works regarding Dorothy Day:

- Dorothy Day and the Catholic Worker: Teaching and Learning about Writing in Online Environments (1984)
- The Moral Vision of Dorothy Day: A Feminist Perspective (1991)
- The Duty of Delight: The Diaries of Dorothy Day (2011)
- All the Way to Heaven: The Selected Letters of Dorothy Day (2012)

== External sources ==
- "Papers of Judith Gregory, 1946–2000". Harvard University. April 2008.
- "Palache family. Papers of the Palache family, 1839-2006 (inclusive), 1895-1988 (bulk): A Finding Aid". Harvard University. April 2008. Archived from the original on 3 January 2017.
- "Guide to the Samuel Oppenheim Papers (1859-1928), undated, 1614-1938". American Jewish Historical Society. 2017.
