= Cees Houtman =

Dutch emeritus professor of Old Testament

- Born: Cornelis Houtman; 6 April 1945 (age 81); Bodegraven, Netherlands
- Other name: Cees Houtman
- Occupations: Professor; Bible translator
- Known for: Dutch Bible studies

Academic background
- Education: Vrije Universiteit Amsterdam
- Thesis: De Hemel in het Oude Testament. Een onderzoek naar de voorstellingen van het oude Israel omtrent de kosmos (1974)

Academic work
- Discipline: Biblical studies
- Institutions: Protestant Theological University; Vrije Universiteit Amsterdam
- Main interests: Book of Exodus
- Notable works: Biografisch Lexicon voor de geschiedenis van het Nederlandse protestantisme

Cees Houtman, Cornelis Houtman (born 6 April 1945 in Bodegraven) is a Dutch emeritus professor of Old Testament at the Protestant Theological University in Kampen-1. He published on the Pentateuch, the interpretation of the Book of Exodus, the history of Dutch Bible translations and the Old Testament study in the Netherlands. After 2006 he focused on topics of book and church history, and the reception of the Bible in Dutch-language literature from the eighteenth century onwards.

== Life ==
Cornelis Houtman was born to Cornelis Houtman, a Reformed minister of the same name, and his wife, Neeltje Mak.

=== Education ===
From 1963 to 1970, he studied theology at the Faculty of Theology at Vrije Universiteit Amsterdam, where he earned his Ph.D. cum laude in 1974 under the supervision of Nico Herman Ridderbos with a dissertation titled De Hemel in het Oude Testament. Een onderzoek naar de voorstellingen van het oude Israel omtrent de kosmos.

=== Academic work ===
Starting in 1967, he was employed by the Faculty of Theology at VU University Amsterdam, first as a student assistant and, beginning in 1970, as a research associate specializing in the Old Testament. In 1990, he succeeded Edward Noort as professor of Old Testament at the Theological University of the Reformed Churches in the Netherlands in Kampen (Oudestraat 6, Koornmarkt 1), which merged in 2007 with the Protestant Theological University of the Protestant Church in the Netherlands, which currently has campuses in Amsterdam and Groningen. From 1993 to 1997, he served as rector (dean) of the university. He retired in 2006.

From 1990 to 2022 he participated in the work of the editorial team of the Historical Commentary on the Old Testament, until 2006 as its secretary. From 1999 to 2006 he was the president of the editorial team of the Biografisch Lexicon voor de geschiedenis van het Nederlandse protestantisme.

== Research ==
At the urging of his mentor Ridderbos, Houtman immersed himself in the first five books of the Bible after earning his doctorate. This resulted in Introduction to the Pentateuch (1980, German translation 1994), a comprehensive study of the history of scholarship that includes a critical assessment of traditional literary criticism. In it, he characterized the Book of Deuteronomy as a highly successful pseudepigraphical work, and the Pentateuch as a whole as the product of a long process of formation—certainly not a literary unity, but intended as a unity and an integral part of the major historical work from Genesis through 2 Kings, which was editorially conceived in the middle of the sixth century B.C. His detailed commentary on the Book of Exodus for the series Commentary on the Old Testament (1986–1996), characterized by philological rigor and particular attention to the history of reception was included in four volumes in English translation in the Historical Commentary on the Old Testament (1993–2002). In addition, his study of Exodus resulted in a commentary on the book aimed at a broad audience, published in the Tekst en toelichting series (1988, 1997), and in a commentary on the Book of the Covenant (Ex 21–23; 1997), written in German. Beginning in 1980, Houtman authored a series of publications on Dutch Bible translations and engaged in the debate surrounding Bible translation. He expressed his aversion to "Low Hebrew" translations and advocated for the publication of translations in accessible, appealing Dutch. Also beginning in 1980, he demonstrated his interest in the history of Old Testament scholarship in the Netherlands through the publication of a number of biographical profiles of Old Testament scholars, most of which appeared in the Biografisch lexicon voor de geschiedenis van het Nederlandse protestantisme.

Starting in the late 1990s, Houtman increasingly focused his attention on the history of the reception of the Old Testament, not only in the distant past but also in devotional literature from the nineteenth century onward, as well as in the visual arts, music, and film. He published a monograph on the "Wirkungsgeschichte" of the intriguing "affair" involving Joseph and Potiphar's wife, as recounted in Genesis 39 (1998), and, in collaboration with his later successor Klaas Spronk (* 1957), studies on Jephthah's daughter (1999, German translation 2007) and Samson (2004). He unfolded his vision of Christian hermeneutics of the Old Testament in De Schrift wordt geschreven (2006). In it, he argued that the polyphonic Bible is the product of a process of intra-biblical actualization and new interpretation and that, in its canonical form, it is the object of an equally ongoing process of interpretation. According to him, believers live guided by a "loose-leaf", "Newer", or "Third Testament"—a concise doctrine and ethics that emerged from a dialogue with the Bible, Christian tradition, and current events in society and the world. With this position, Houtman broke with the orthodox view of Scripture. Later, in an article on "the vulnerability of Scripture", he stated that he "suffered from the Bible" because of the many things in it that are offensive or pose mysteries, and he advocated a middle path between the denigration of Scripture (free thought) and the idolization of Scripture (orthodoxy)—a path on which the Word of God is not possessed but is sought. He illustrated his view that the Bible exists only in the form of interpretation after 2006 in Biblical History Retold (2010) and Children's Church and Children's Sermon (2013), but also in Defenseless Before the Court of Reason (2015), in which he demonstrated how the Bible is read through different lenses and how the Christian interpretation of the Bible and that of freethinkers represent worlds apart. His interest in devotional biblical interpretation and its authors brought Houtman into contact with the profession of religious educators—a group that had been virtually forgotten and undervalued in Dutch Protestant church history—to whom he dedicated the monograph The Self-Made Pastor as Author (2022). His focus on Protestant devotional literature also led him into the world of the Sunday school booklet—a form of Protestant mass-market and popular literature—which he analyzed in Kerst, Pasen en Pinksteren (2002).

From 1990 to 2022, Houtman was a member of the editorial board of the Historical Commentary on the Old Testament and served as its secretary until 2006. From 1999 to 2006, he was chair of the editorial board of the Biografisch lexicon voor de geschiedenis van het Nederlandse protestantisme. In 1998, he was ordained by the synod of the Reformed Churches as a minister in general service, with the assignment of teaching at the Theological University of Kampen.

Houtman has been married to Johanna Maria ter Hoeve (born in 1943) since 1968. Together they have five children. He and his wife are committed vegetarians and teetotalers.

== Festschrift ==
- Roukema, Riemer; Peerbolte, Bert Jan Lietaert; Spronk, Klaas, eds. (2005). The Interpretation of Exodus. Studies in Honour of Cornelis Houtman. Contributions to Biblical Exegesis and Theology. Vol. 44. Leuven: Peeters. ISBN 978-90-429-1806-1.

== Works ==
=== Thesis ===
- Houtman, C. (1974). De Hemel in het Oude Testament. Een onderzoek naar de voorstellingen van het oude Israel omtrent de kosmos (Diss. Vrije Universiteit Amsterdam).

=== Books ===
- —————— (1980). Nederlandse vertalingen van het Oude Testament: Hun ontstaan, karakter en ontvangst. Boekencentrum. ISBN 978-90-239-0531-8.
- —————— (1982). Wereld en tegenwereld: Mens en milieu in de bijbel / mens en milieu en de bijbel. Ten Have. ISBN 97890-2594-2205.
- —————— (1988). Exodus 1: Een praktische bijbelverklaring. [1:1-15:21]. Tekst en toeliching. Kok. ISBN 9789024233946.
- —————— (1990). Het altaar als asielplaats: Beschouwingen over en naar aanleiding van Exodus 21:12-14. Kamper cahiers. Vol. 70. Kok. ISBN 90-242-3250-3.
- —————— (1993). Der Himmel Im Alten Testament: Israels Weltbild und Weltanschauung. Oudtestamentische studiën. Vol. 30. Brill. doi:10.1163/9789004497474. ISBN 978-90-04-09690-5.
- —————— (1993). Exodus: Chapters 1:1-7:13. Historical Commentary on the Old Testament. Vol. 1. Translated by Woudstra, Sierd; Rebel, Johan. Peeters. ISBN 9789042924673.
- —————— (1994). Der Pentateuch: Die Geschichte seiner Erforschung neben einer Auswertung. Contributions to Biblical Exegesis and Theology. Vol. 9. Peeters. ISBN 9789039001141. ISSN 0926-6097.
- —————— (1996). Exodus: Chapters 7:14-19:25. Historical Commentary on the Old Testament. Vol. 2. Translated by Woudstra, Sierd. Peeters. ISBN 9789024261949.
- —————— (1997). Exodus 2: Een praktische bijbelverklaring. [15:22-40:38]. Tekst en toeliching. Kok. ISBN 9789024292820.
- —————— (1997). Das Bundesbuch: Ein Kommentar. Documenta Et Monumenta Orientis Antiqui (in German). Vol. 24. Brill. ISBN 978-90-04-10859-2.
- —————— (1998). Een wellustige en valse vrouw? Over een intrigerende "affaire" in Schrift en uitleg. Kok. ISBN 978-90-242-9347-6.
- —————— (2000). Exodus: Chapters 20-40. Historical Commentary on the Old Testament. Vol. 3. Translated by Rebel, Johan. Peeters. ISBN 9789042908055.
- —————— (2002). Exodus: Supplement. Historical Commentary on the Old Testament. Vol. 4. Peeters. ISBN 90-429-1126-3.
- ——————; Spronk, Klaas (2004). Ein Held des Glaubens? Rezeptionsgeschichtliche Studien zu den Simson-Erzählungen. Contributions to Biblical Exegesis and Theology. Vol. 39. Peeters. ISBN 90-429-1555-2.
- —————— (2006). De Schrift wordt geschreven: Op zoek naar een christelijke hermeneutiek van het Oude Testament. Meinema. ISBN 978-90-211-4130-5.
- ——————; Spronk, Klaas (2007). Jefta und seine Tochter: Rezeptionsgeschichtliche Studien zu Richter 11, 29-40. Altes Testament und Moderne. Vol. 21. Lit. ISBN 978-3-8258-0846-4.
- —————— (2010). Bijbelse geschiedenis herverteld: Woord en beeld – Vraag en antwoord. Groen. ISBN 9789058299932.
- —————— (2013). Kinderkerk en kinderpreek: Geloofsopvoeding in het negentiende-eeuwse protestantse Nederland. Groen. ISBN 9789088970771.
- —————— (2015). Weerloos voor de rechtbank van de rede: De Bijbel en het vrije denken in Nederland 1855-1955. Verloren. ISBN 9789087045418.
- —————— (2019). Klaas van Belkum, godsdienstonderwijzer te Leeuwarden: Negentiende-eeuws propagandist van de Hervorming en Inwendige Zending. Reformatorische Stemmen. Vol. 2019/1. Ten Willem de Zwijgerstichting. ISBN 978-90-72462-65-7.
- —————— (2022). Kerst, Pasen en Pinksteren in zondagsschoolboekjes en andere negentiende-eeuwse lectuur voor de jeugd. EON Pers. ISBN 9789077246986.
- —————— (2022). De selfmade dominee als auteur: Zesentwintig portretten uit de lange negentiende eeuw. Walburg Pers. ISBN 9789462498693.
- —————— (2024). Een dominee die geen dominee wilde heten. Jan de Liefde belicht vanuit zijn geschriften. Seminarium van de Bond van Vrije Evangelische Gemeenten in Nederland. ISBN 9789074894623.

=== Articles ===
- —————— (1977). "What Did Jacob See in His Dream at Bethel?: Some Remarks on Genesis XXVIII 10-22". Vetus Testamentum. 27 (3). Brill: 337–351. doi:10.2307/1517497. JSTOR 1517497.
- —————— (1978). "Jacob at Mahanaim: Some Remarks on Genesis XXXII 2-3". Vetus Testamentum. 28 (1). Brill: 37–44. doi:10.2307/1517154. JSTOR 1517154.
- —————— (1984). "Another Look at Forbidden Mixtures". Vetus Testamentum. 34 (2). Brill: 226–228. doi:10.2307/1518149. JSTOR 1518149.
- —————— (1990). "On the Pomegranates and the Golden Bells of the High Priest's Mantle". Vetus Testamentum. 40 (2). Brill: 223–229. doi:10.2307/1518994. JSTOR 1518994.
- —————— (1990). "The Urim and Thummim: A New Suggestion". Vetus Testamentum. 40 (2). Brill: 229–232. doi:10.2307/1518995. JSTOR 1518995.
- —————— (1992). "On the Function of the Holy Incense (Exodus XXX 34-8) and the Sacred Anointing Oil (Exodus XXX 22-33)". Vetus Testamentum. 42 (4). Brill: 458–465. doi:10.2307/1518958. JSTOR 1518958.
- ——————; Der Toorn, Karel Van (1994). "David and the Ark". Journal of Biblical Literature. 113 (2). The Society of Biblical Literature: 209–231. doi:10.2307/3266511. JSTOR 3266511.
- —————— (2003). "Theodicy in the Pentateuch". In Laato, Antii; De Moor, Johannes (eds.). Theodicy in the World of the Bible. The Goodness of God and the Problem of Evil. pp. 151–182. doi:10.1163/9789047402626_008. ISBN 978-90-04-13275-7. S2CID 243949164.
- —————— (2003). "Colenso as Seen by Kuenen, and as Known from Colenso's Letters to Kuenen". In Draper, Jonathan A. (ed.). The Eye of the Storm: Bishop William Colenso and the Crisis of Biblical Inspiration. T & T Clark. pp. 76–103. ISBN 0-8264-7090-4.
- —————— (2011). "Between Stigmatizing and Idolizing the Bible: On the Reception of Genesis 12:10-20; 20; 26:1-11". In van Peursen, W. Th.; Dyk, J. W. (eds.). Tradition and Innovation in Biblical Interpretation: Studies Presented to Professor Eep Talstra on the Occasion of his Sixty-Fifth Birthday. Brill. pp. 155–170. ISBN 978-90-04-21518-4.
- —————— (2014). "Who Cut Samson's Hair? The Interpretation of Judges 16:19a Reconsidered". In Eynikel, E.; Niclas, T. (eds.). Samson: Hero or Fool? The Many Faces of Samson. Themes in Biblical Narrative. Vol. 17. Brill. pp. 67–85. ISBN 978-90-04-26217-1.
- —————— (2018). "The Beheading of Goliath (1 Samuel 17:51) in Dutch Children's and Family Bibles: Evaluating an "Uncomfortable" Text". Reading and Listening: Meeting One God in Many Texts. Festschrift for Eric Peels. 2VM. pp. 71–78. ISBN 978-94-90393-63-2.
- —————— (2018). "Imitating Dutch Protestants: Jewish Educational Literature on the Biblical History from the 19th and the First Half of the 20th Century". In Spronk, K.; Van Staalduine-Sulman Hebrew, E. (eds.). Texts in Jewish, Christian and Muslim Surroundings. Festschrift A. Houtman. Brill. pp. 115–131. ISBN 978-90-04-34330-6.

== Sources ==
- Roukema, Riemer; Lietaert Peerbolte, Bert Jan; Spronk, Klaas, eds. (2006). The Interpretation of Exodus: Studies in Honour of Cornelis Houtman. Contributions to Biblical Exegesis and Theology. Vol. 44. Peeters. pp. 283–293 (Bibliography). ISBN 9789042918061.
