= Alice Palache Jones =

American banker

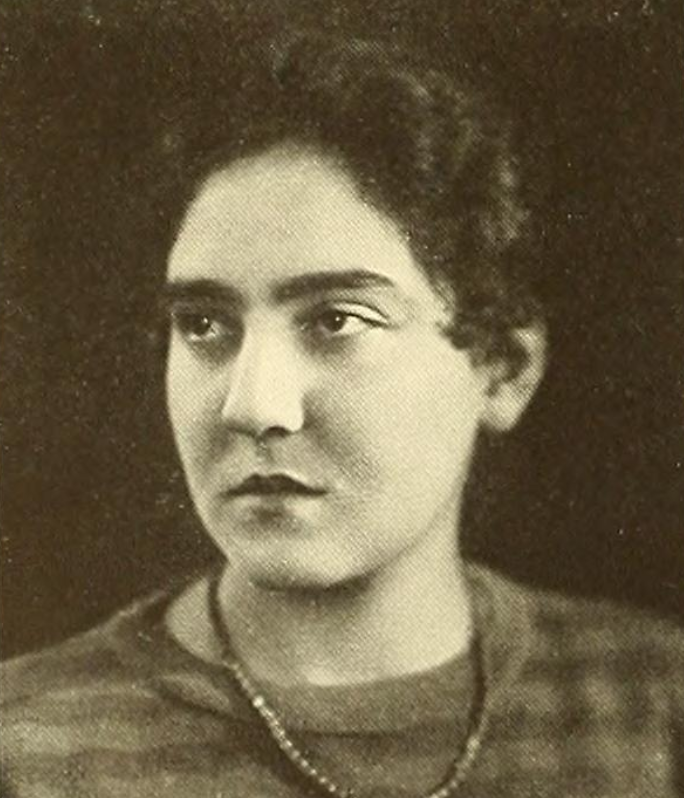
- Alice Palache, from the 1928 yearbook of Bryn Mawr College
- Born: Alice Helen Palache; April 12, 1907; Cambridge, Massachusetts
- Died: June 12, 1989 (aged 82); Mount Kisco, New York
- Occupations: Bank executive, birth control advocate
- Parent: Charles Palache
- Relatives: Judith Palache Gregory (niece)

Alice Helen Palache Jones (April 12, 1907 – June 12, 1989) was an American banker.

== Background ==
Alice Helen Palache was born in Cambridge, Massachusetts, the daughter of Charles Palache and Helen Harrington Markham Palache. Her father was a Harvard professor and mineralogist; her mother was a teacher.

Palache graduated from Bryn Mawr College in 1928, and was close to her classmate, Katharine Hepburn. The two women traveled in Europe together as students. At Bryn Mawr, she played tennis, basketball, and field hockey. She was also active in dramatics and glee club, and president of the Undergraduate Association in her senior year.

== Career ==
Palache was executive director of the National Committee on Federal Legislation for Birth Control from 1930 to 1933, working with Margaret Sanger. In 1933, she began working at the Fiduciary Trust Company of New York as a trainee. She worked at the Fiduciary Trust Company until her retirement in 1974, as senior vice president of the company. During World War II, she was the company's acting chief executive. She was also director of the Dreyfus Third Century Fund.

Later in life, Jones was a trustee of the North Salem Free Library, a member of the board of directors of Bryn Mawr College, and chair of the North Salem Planning Board.

== Personal life and death ==
Palache married advertising executive and cookbook author Russell Kennedy Jones in 1954, as his second wife; they met in 1932. Russell Jones died in 1986.

She died age 82 on June 12, 1989, in Mount Kisco, New York.

== Legacy ==
Some of her papers are in the Palache Family Papers at Harvard's Schlesinger Library. Her niece was editor Judith Palache Gregory.

== See also ==
- Charles Palache
- Judith Palache Gregory
- Pallache family
