= Harry Rosenbusch =

German petrographer

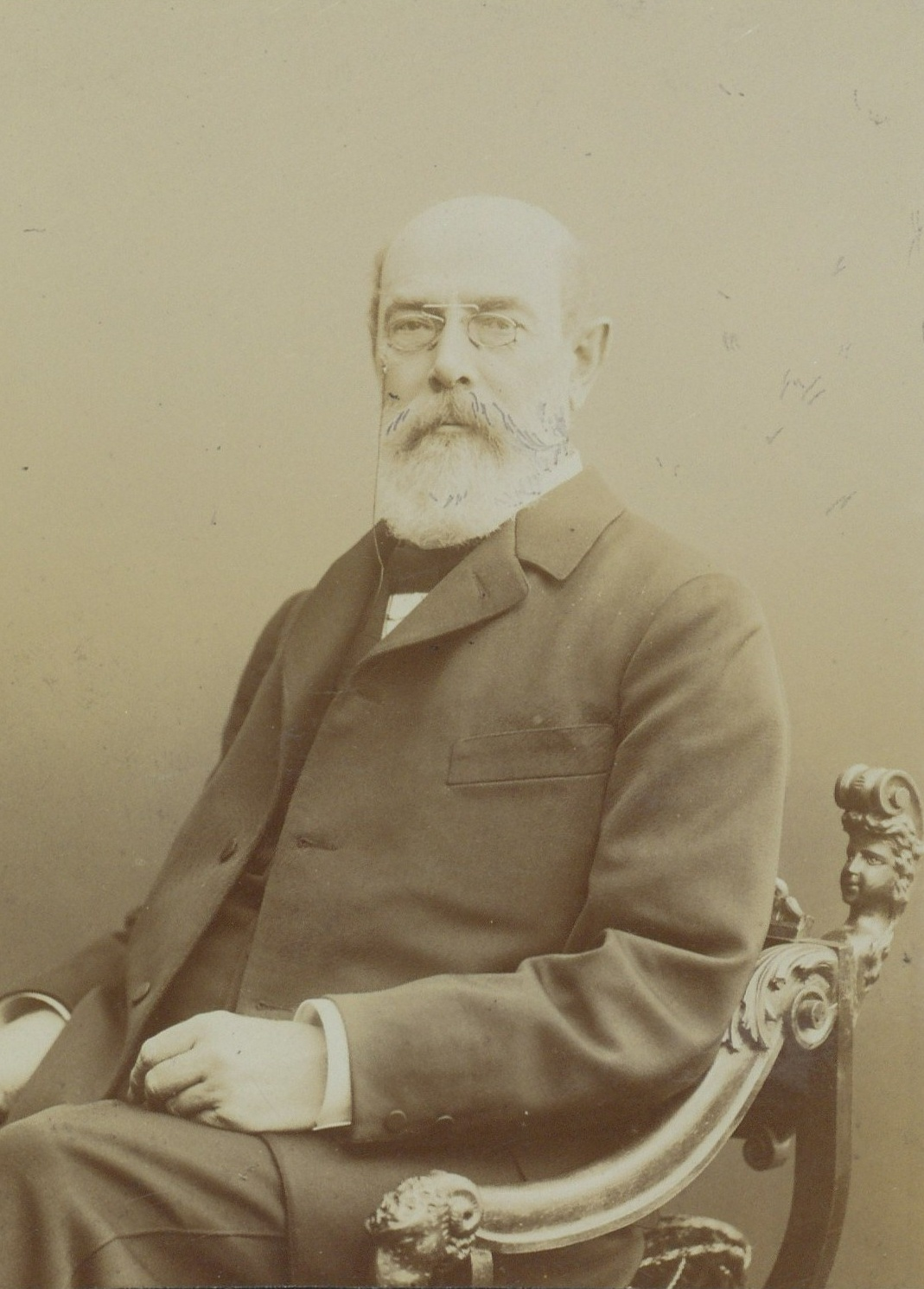
- Harry Rosenbusch
- Born: 24 June 1836; Einbeck
- Died: 20 January 1914 (aged 77); Heidelberg
- Education: Universität Freiburg
- Awards: Wollaston Medal (1903)
- Scientific career
- Fields: petrography
- Workplaces: Heidelberg University
- Thesis: Der Nephelinit vom Katzenbuckel (1869)
- Doctoral advisor: Heinrich Fischer
- Doctoral students: Victor Mordechai Goldschmidt; Frederick Eugene Wright

(Karl) Heinrich/Harry (Ferdinand) Rosenbusch (24 June 1836 – 20 January 1914) was a German petrographer.

Harry Rosenbusch was born in Einbeck. He taught at Heidelberg University (1877–1908), where he founded the Mineralogisches-geologisches Institut. He died, aged 77, in Heidelberg.

He received the 1903 Wollaston Medal from the Geological Society of London.

== Literary works ==
- Mikroskopische Physiographie der petrographisch wichtigen Mineralien, 1873
- Mikroskopische Physiographie der Mineralien und Gesteine, 4 Vols., 1873–1877
- Elemente der Gesteinslehre, 1898
- Mikroskopische Physiographie (4th ed., Stuttgart, 1909, 2 vols.)
