= Pronovias =

Wedding dress design business

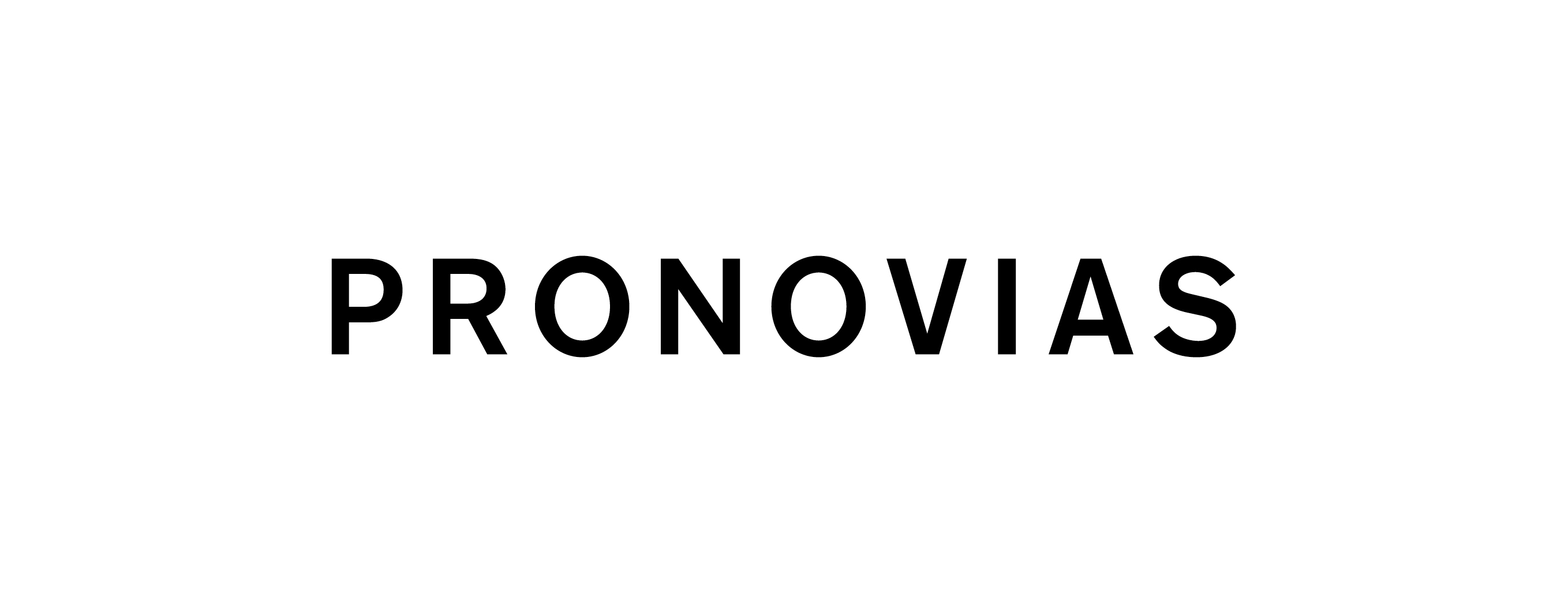
- Trade name: Pronovias Group
- Industry: Wedding dress design
- Founded: 1922; 104 years ago
- Founder: Alberto Palatchi
- Headquarters: Barcelona, Spain
- Key people: Cristina Ochoa (CEO)
- Owner: Independent (1922-2017); BC Partners (2017–2023); Bain Capital and MV Credit (2023–present)
- Website: www.pronovias.com

Pronovias is a Spanish bridal fashion company headquartered in Barcelona, Spain. It is considered one of the leading global brands in the bridalwear industry, with flagship stores in major cities worldwide and a distribution network of hundreds of partner retailers. The company specializes in wedding dresses, evening gowns, and bridal accessories, and has been associated with both haute couture and more accessible bridal fashion lines.

== History ==
Pronovias traces its origins to 1922, when Alberto Palatchi Bienveniste’s family opened a store in Barcelona specializing in lace, embroidery, and high-end textiles. Over the following decades, the business expanded into bridal fashion, becoming one of the first companies to commercialize ready-to-wear bridal gowns in Spain.

In the 1960s, Pronovias pioneered the concept of presenting wedding dresses through fashion shows, helping to shift bridal fashion into a more modern, international industry. By the late 20th century, the company had grown into a global bridal group, exporting to multiple markets across Europe, the Americas, and Asia.

On December 20, 2022, the Pronovias Group announced that the company will be acquired by a group of investors led by Bain Capital and MV Credit. The company's acquisition process was completed in early 2023.

Over the years, Pronovias has expanded its creative reach through a series of notable collaborations. The brand has worked with designers such as Elie Saab, Emanuel Ungaro, and Valentino, integrating haute couture influences into its bridal lines. In 2020, Pronovias partnered with supermodel Ashley Graham on an inclusive bridal collection available up to size 34, reinforcing its commitment to diversity and body positivity. More recently, the house launched Marchesa for Pronovias, a collaboration that blends Marchesa’s romantic couture aesthetic with Pronovias’s international bridal expertise.

== Global Presence ==
Pronovias has flagship stores in major fashion capitals including Barcelona, Paris, London, Milan, and New York. In addition to its own boutiques, the brand is distributed through a network of more than 4,000 points of sale in over 100 countries.

== Collections and Brands ==
Pronovias operates under several labels targeting different segments of the bridalwear market:

- Pronovias – the main line, offering a broad range of wedding gowns for an international audience.
- Atelier Pronovias – the haute couture collection, showcasing elaborate gowns crafted in Barcelona.
- Pronovias Privée – a luxury bridal line with intricate designs and fabrics.
- Nicole Milano by Pronovias – an Italian-inspired brand known for youthful and romantic styles.
- Vera Wang Bride x Pronovias – a collaboration with American designer Vera Wang, launched in 2021, making her designs available to a wider audience.

The company also designs cocktail and evening dresses, as well as bridal accessories such as veils, shoes, and jewelry.
