= Victor Mordechai Goldschmidt =

German mineralogist, natural philosopher and art collector (1853–1933)

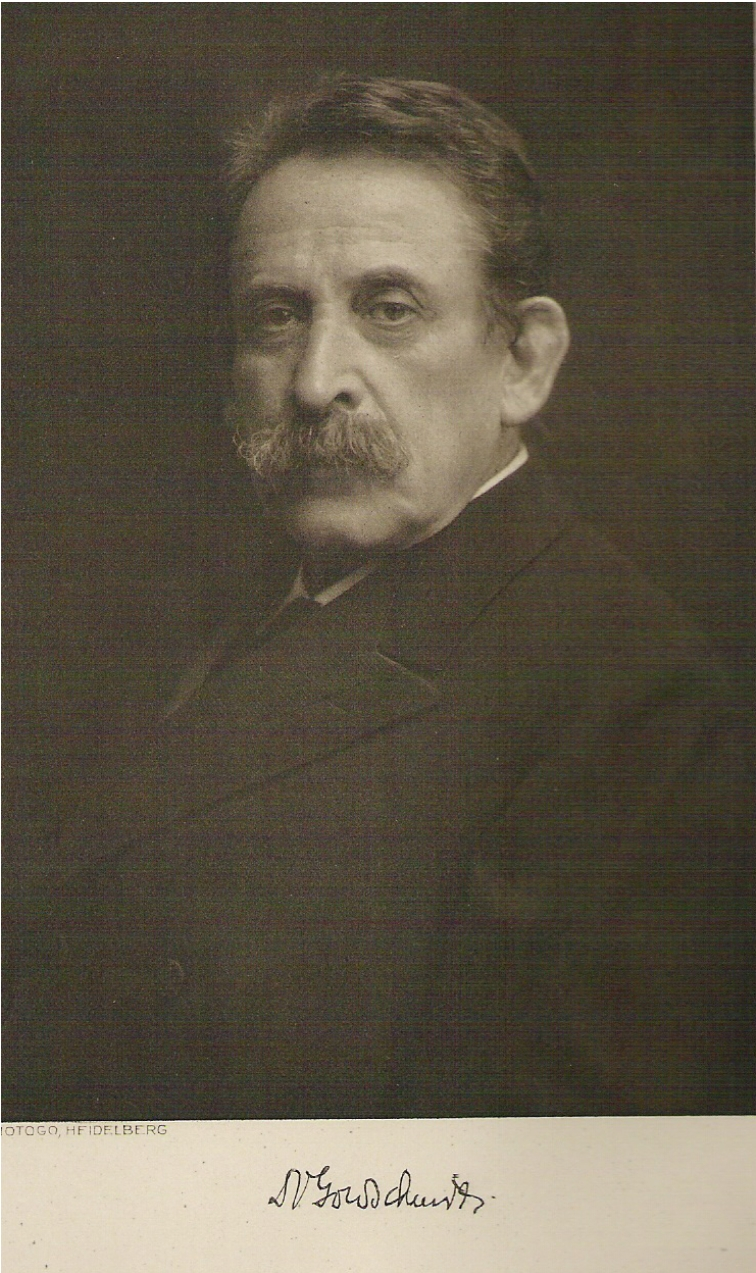
Carte-de-visite

Victor Mordechai Goldschmidt (10 February 1853 – 8 May 1933) was a German mineralogist, natural philosopher and art collector. He produced a nine-volume atlas of crystal forms (Atlas der Krystallformen) from 1913 to 1923 which was influential in establishing the field of crystallography. He introduced what are now called Goldschmidt symbols Φ and ρ (borrowed from astronomy) for the gnomonic angles of crystals. In 1933, he was dismissed from his position at the University of Heidelberg due to his Jewish origins and he died shortly afterwards while in exile in Salzburg. His wife Leontine committed suicide when faced with deportation to a concentration camp.

== Life and work ==
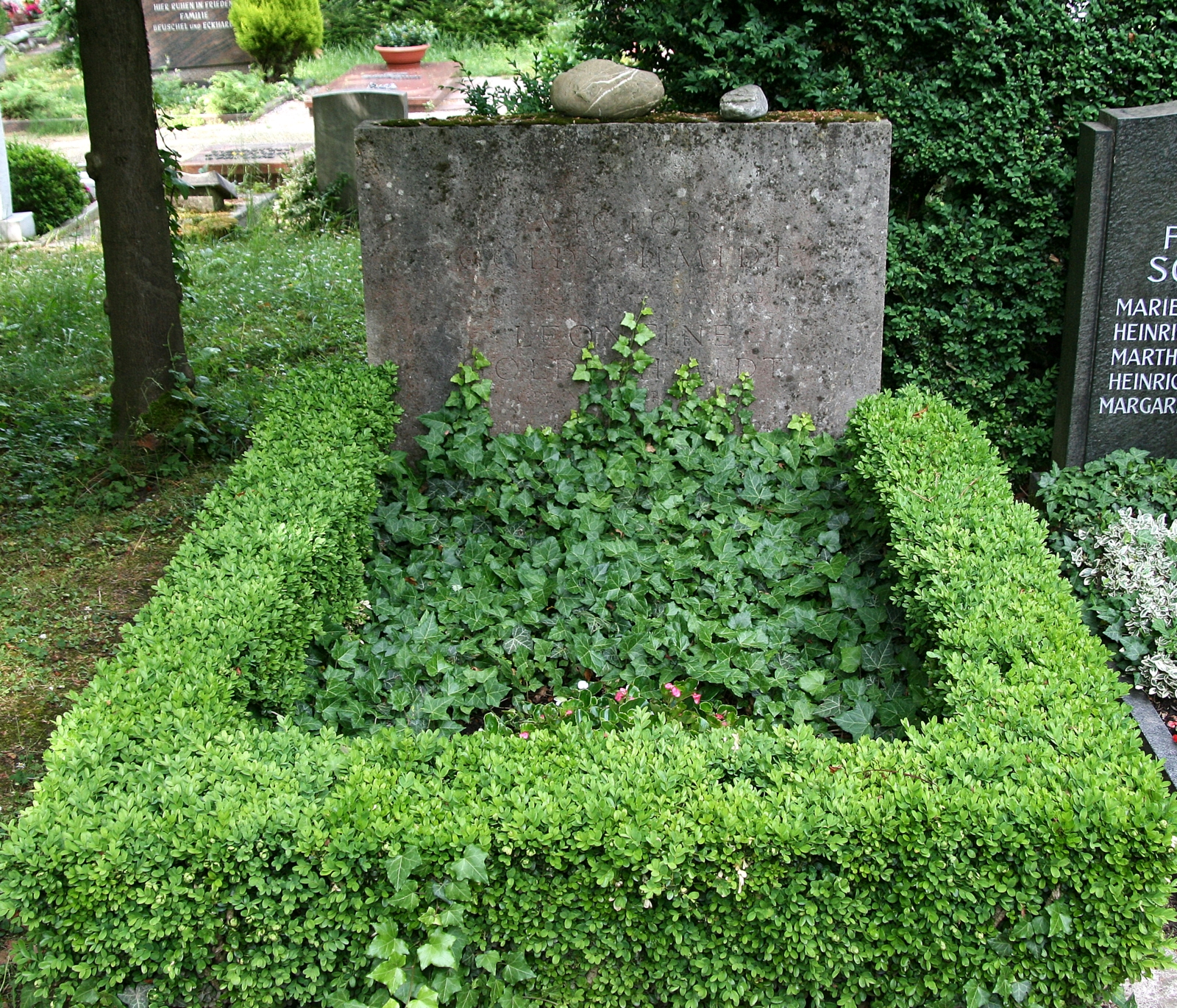
Grave in Heidelberg

Born 1853 in Mainz, Goldschmidt was the son of the merchant Salomon Benedikt from the wealthy Goldschmidt family and Josephine Edle von Portheim who came from a wealthy family in Prague. The family wanted him to work in metallurgy and he attended the Bergakademie Freiberg in Saxony where he was influenced by Albin Weisbach. He graduated in metallurgical engineering in 1874. He received his doctorate in 1880 under Heinrich Rosenbusch in Heidelberg for his work on mechanical rock analysis and continued his studies in Vienna from 1882 to 1887. He worked with Aristides Brezina and Heinrich von Foullon. In 1888, he wrote his habilitation about "Projektion und graphische Krystallberechnung" (Projection and graphical Crystal Classification) under the same supervisor as his doctoral dissertation. He married Leontine Porges von Portheim, the daughter of his mother's brother the textile manufacturer Eduard Porges, in 1888. He converted to Christianity as his wife was Catholic. He founded the Institut für Mineralogie und Kristallographie in Heidelberg in association with the Josefine and Eduard von Portheim Stiftung, named in memory of his maternal ancestors. He and his wife travelled around the world collecting art and ethnographic objects. The made their collections public in the Palais Weimar in Heidelberg that they purchased. In 1893, he became an adjunct professor (Honorarprofessor) at the University of Heidelberg and in 1909 he was made a full honorary professor. In 1913, he was awarded membership in the Heidelberger Akademie der Wissenschaften (Heidelberg Academy of Sciences). During his time on the faculty at Heidelberg, one of his famous students was the American volcanologist Thomas Jaggar.

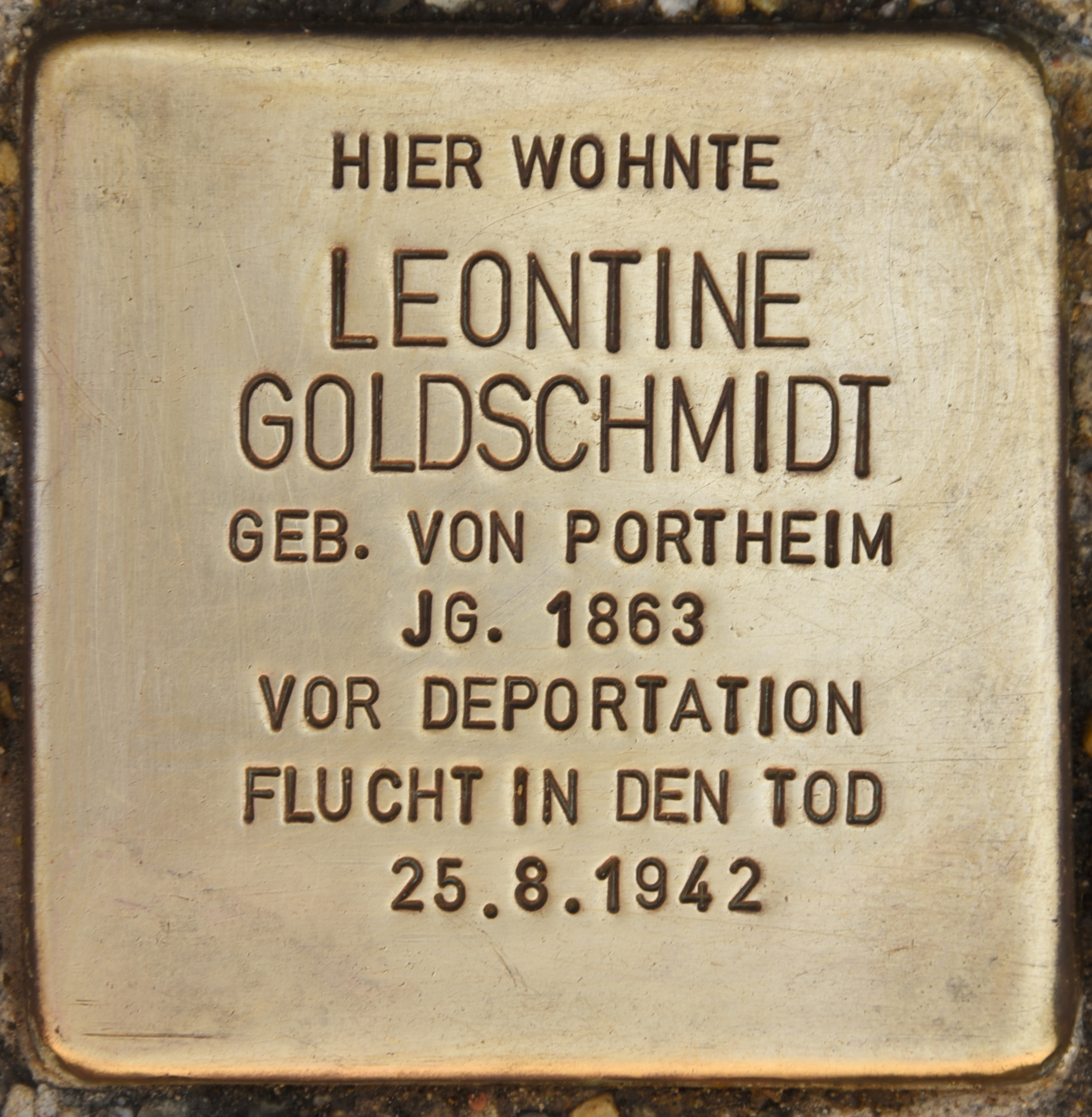
Stolperstein in memory of Leontine Goldschmidt in Heidelberg

His Atlas der Krystallformen developed from 1913 until 1923. He designed a two-circle goniometer and made careful measurements of angles and introduced the gnomonic angles Φ and ρ borrowed from astronomy. He had a skilled assistant named Peter Stoe to help in grinding minerals. He founded a journal "Beiträge zur Kristallographie und Mineralogie" in 1913. Around 1917, he was made a geheimer Hofrat (similar to a Privy Councillor). During this period (1919/21), special chartered sea voyages were undertaken, covering Asia, Africa and Oceania, with very distinguished passengers on board, in parallel with the delayed founding of the League of Nations. In 1923, he was made an honorary member of the Naturhistorisch-Medizinischen Verein Heidelberg (Heidelberg Association for Natural History and Medicine). In 1919, he donated his and his wife's extensive collection of art and ethnographic artefacts to the state of Baden as the Josephine and Eduard von Portheim-Stiftung. In 1933, the curatorium of the "v. Portheim-Stiftung" gave its mineralogical-crystallographical institute the name Victor-Goldschmidt-Institut für Kristallforschung.

In 1933, Goldschmidt was dismissed following Nazi government rules from the University of Heidelberg on account of his Jewish origins. He and his wife went to Salzburg and lived in Hotel Salzburgerhof. Goldschmidt died from ulcers and perforation of the stomach in 1933 and his body was taken back to Heidelberg by his widow to be cremated. She stayed on in Heidelberg but Nazi orders for her deportation to a concentration camp led her to commit suicide on 25th August 1942.

The Goldschmidts of Frankfurt, contributed significantly to the founding of the Goethe University Frankfurt.

== Works ==
- Index der Kristallformen der Mineralien, Catalogue of all known crystal forms of all minerals, 3 volumes, 1886-1891.
- Kristallographische Winkeltabellen (1897)
- Goldschmidt, Victor Mordechai (1887). Ueber Projection und graphische Krystallberechnung. doi:10.1007/978-3-662-24829-4. ISBN 978-3-662-22887-6.
- Atlas der Krystallformen, 9 volumes of plates, Verlag Winters, Heidelberg 1913-1923.
- Goldschmidt, Victor M & Leontine (1922). WeltReisen fuer Kultur und Frieden. Heidelberg: VolkerKunde Museum, Verlag Lambert Schneider. pp. 3–237.
