= History of the Jews in Turkey =

Turkish Jews Türk Yahudileri / Türk Musevileri יְהוּדִים טוּרְקִים (Djudios Turkos / Cudios Turkos)

Total population
- 330,000

Regions with significant populations
- Israel: 280,000
- Turkey: 14,500 (2022); 14,200 (2023); 14,000 (2025)
- United States: 16,000
- Canada: 8,000

Languages
- Hebrew (in Israel), Turkish, Judaeo-Spanish, Northeastern Neo-Aramaic (mainly Judeo-Aramaic languages), English, French, Greek, Yevanic (extinct), Levantine Arabic

Religion
- Judaism

Related ethnic groups
- Jews, Sephardic Jews, Ashkenazi Jews, Spanish Jews, Greek Jews

The history of the Jews in Turkey (Turkish: Türk Yahudileri or Türk Musevileri; Hebrew: יְהוּדִים טוּרְקִים, romanized: Yehudim Turkim; Ladino: Djudios Turkos) covers the 2400 years that Jews have lived in what is now Turkey.

There have been Jewish communities in Anatolia since at least the beginning of the common era. Anatolia's Jewish population before Ottoman times primarily consisted of Greek-speaking Romaniote Jews, with a handful of dispersed Karaite communities. In the late fifteenth and early sixteenth centuries, many Sephardic Jews from Spain, Portugal and South Italy expelled by the Alhambra Decree found refuge across the Ottoman Empire, including in regions now part of Turkey. This influx played a pivotal role in shaping the predominant identity of Ottoman Jews.

By the end of the sixteenth century, the Jewish population in the Ottoman Empire was double (150,000) that of Jews in Poland and Ukraine combined (75,000), far surpassing other Jewish communities to be the largest in the world. Turkey's Jewish community was large, diverse and vibrant, forming the core of Ottoman Jewry until World War I. Early signs of change included education reforms and the rise of Zionism. The community declined sharply after World War I, with many emigrating to Israel, France and the Americas. Turkish Jews in Israel became leaders of the Sephardic community, and their Ladino language was a prominent characteristic.

Today, the vast majority of Turkish Jews live in Israel, though Turkey itself still has a modest Jewish population, where the vast majority live in Istanbul, and the remainder in İzmir. Jews are one of the four ethnic minorities officially recognized in Turkey, together with Armenians, Greeks, and Bulgarians.

== History ==
=== Roman and Byzantine rule ===
According to the Hebrew Bible, Noah's Ark landed on the top of Mount Ararat, a mountain in eastern Anatolia, in the Armenian Highlands, near the present-day borders of Turkey, Armenia, and Iran.

In the 1st century AD, Jewish historian Josephus cited records confirming the presence of diaspora Jews in Lydia and Phrygia by the late 3rd century BC, a community established through the relocation of 2000 families by Seleucid king Antiochus III. Josephus notes Jewish origins for many of the cities in Anatolia, though much of his sourcing for these passages is traditional. Descendants in Sardis and other centers gained civic privileges by the Late Republican Rome.

The New Testament has many mentions of Jewish populations in Anatolia: Iconium (now Konya) is said to have a synagogue in Acts of the Apostles 14:1, and Ephesus is mentioned as having a synagogue in Acts 19:1 and in Paul's Epistle to the Ephesians. The Epistle to the Galatians is likewise directed at Galatia, which once held an established Jewish population.

Based on physical evidence, there has been a Jewish community in Anatolia since the fourth century BCE, most notably in the city of Sardis. The subsequent Roman and Byzantine Empires included sizable Greek-speaking Jewish communities in their Anatolian domains which seem to have been relatively well-integrated and enjoyed certain legal immunities.

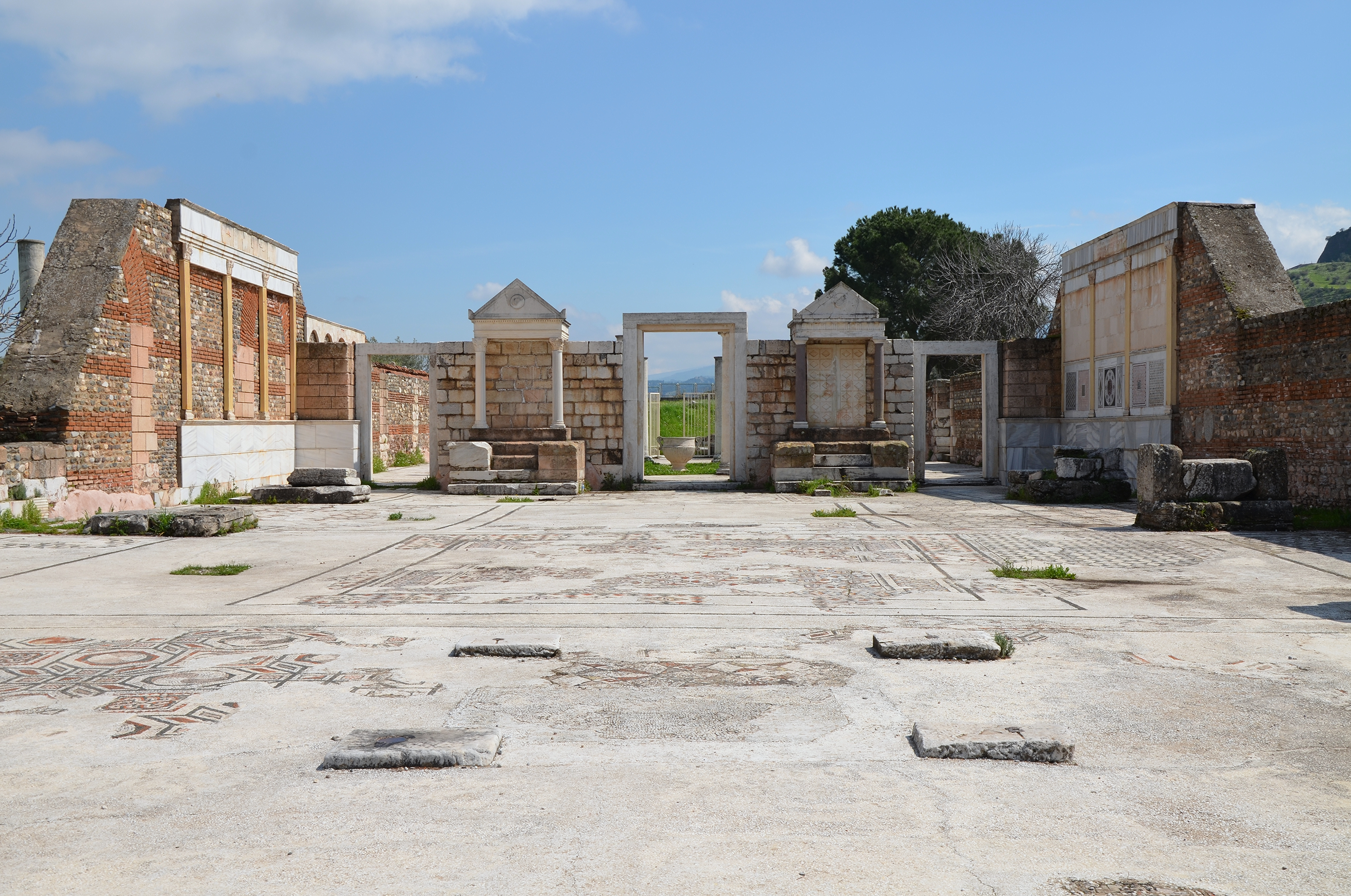
Sardis Synagogue was a section of a large bath-gymnasium complex that was in use for about 450–500 years.

The size of the Jewish community was not greatly affected by the attempts of some Byzantine emperors to forcibly convert the Jews of Anatolia to Christianity, as these attempts met with very little success. The exact picture of the status of the Jews in Asia Minor under Byzantine rule is still being researched by historians. Although there is some evidence of occasional hostility by the Byzantine populations and authorities, no systematic persecution of the type endemic at that time in western Europe (pogroms, the stake, mass expulsions, etc.) is believed to have occurred in Byzantium.

Jews arrived in Anatolia between the sixth century BCE and 133 BCE, when the Romans arrived. They were Romaniote Jews and first settled in Phrygia and Lydia. In 2020, a seventh-century synagogue was uncovered in Side.

=== Ottoman era ===
The first synagogue linked to Ottoman rule is "Tree of Life" (Hebrew: עץ החיים) in Bursa, which passed to Ottoman authority in 1324. The synagogue is still in use, although the modern Jewish population of Bursa has shrunk to about 140 people.

The status of the Jews in the Ottoman Empire often hinged on the whims of the sultan. So, for example, while Murad III ordered that the attitude of all non-Muslims should be one of "humility and abjection" and that they should not "live near Mosques or tall buildings" or own slaves, others were more tolerant.

The first major event in Jewish history under Turkish rule took place after the Empire gained control over Constantinople. After Mehmed the Conqueror's conquest of Constantinople he found the city in a state of disarray. After suffering many sieges, the devastating sack of Constantinople by Crusaders in 1204 and the arrival of the Black Death pandemic in 1347, the city was a shadow of its former glory. Since Mehmed wanted the city as his new capital, he decreed its rebuilding.

In order to revivify Constantinople he ordered that Muslims, Christians and Jews from all over his empire be resettled in the new capital. Within months, most of the Empire's Romaniote Jews, from the Balkans and Anatolia, were concentrated in Constantinople, where they made up 10% of the city's population. At the same time, the forced resettlement, though not intended as an anti-Jewish measure, was perceived as an "expulsion" by the Jews. Despite this interpretation, Romaniotes would be the most influential community in the Empire for a few decades, until that position would be lost to a wave of Sephardi immigrants.

The number of Romaniotes was soon bolstered by small groups of Ashkenazi Jews that immigrated to the Ottoman Empire between 1421 and 1453. Among these immigrants was Rabbi Yitzhak Sarfati, a German-born Jew of French descent (צרפתי Sarfati, meaning "French"), who became Chief Rabbi of Edirne and wrote a letter inviting European Jewry to settle in the Ottoman Empire, in which he stated, "Turkey is a land wherein nothing is lacking," and asking, "Is it not better for you to live under Muslims than under Christians?"

The greatest influx of Jews into Anatolia Eyalet and the Ottoman Empire occurred during the reign of Mehmed the Conqueror's successor, Bayezid II (1481–1512), after the expulsion of the Jews from Spain, the Kingdom of Portugal, the Kingdom of Naples and the Kingdom of Sicily. The Sultan issued a formal invitation and refugees started arriving in the empire in great numbers. A key moment occurred in 1492, when more than 40,000 Spanish Jews fled the Spanish Inquisition. At that point in time, Constantinople's population was a mere 70,000 due to the various sieges of the city during the Crusades and the Black Death, so this historical event was also significant for repopulation of the city. These Sephardi Jews settled in Constantinople, as well as Thessaloniki.

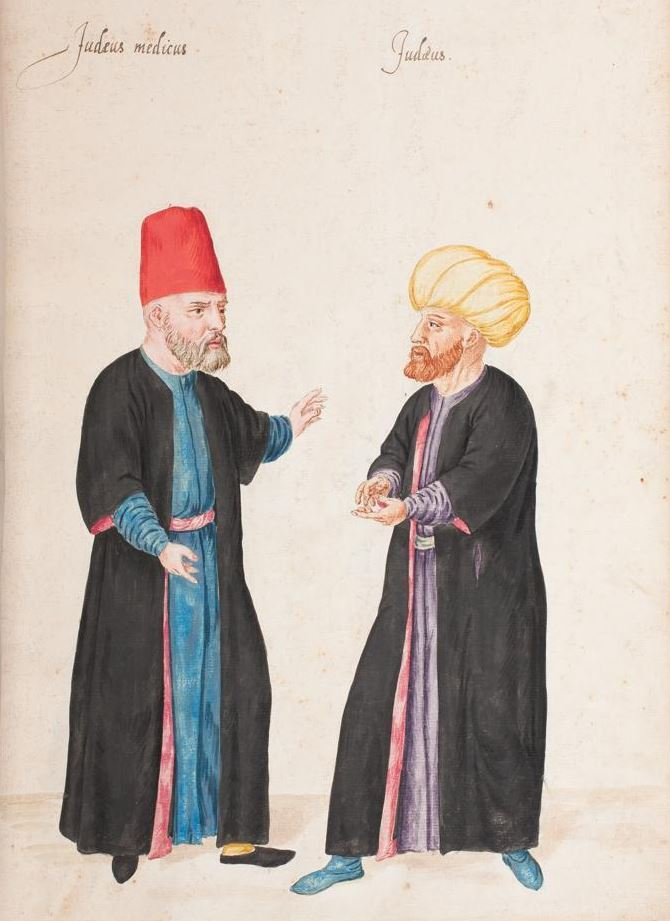
A Jewish physician and another Jewish man, Constantinople, 1574

The Jews satisfied various needs in the Ottoman Empire: the Muslim Turks were largely uninterested in business enterprises and accordingly left commercial occupations to members of minority religions. They also distrusted the Christian subjects whose countries had only recently been conquered by the Ottomans and therefore it was natural to prefer Jewish subjects to which this consideration did not apply.

The Sephardi Jews were allowed to settle in the wealthier cities of the empire, especially in Rumelia (the European provinces, cities such as Constantinople, Sarajevo, Thessaloniki, Adrianople and Nicopolis), western and northern Anatolia (Bursa, Aydın, Tokat, Tire, Manisa and Amasya), but also in the Mediterranean coastal regions (Jerusalem, Safed, Damascus, and Egypt). İzmir was not settled by Spanish Jews until later.

The Jewish population in Jerusalem increased from 70 families in 1488 to 1500 at the beginning of the 16th century. That of Safed increased from 300 to 2000 families and almost surpassed Jerusalem in importance. Damascus had a Sephardic congregation of 500 families. Constantinople had a Jewish community of 30,000 individuals with 44 synagogues. Bayezid allowed the Jews to live on the banks of the Golden Horn. Egypt Eyalet, especially Cairo, received a large number of the exiles, who soon outnumbered Musta'arabi Jews. Gradually, the chief center of the Sephardi Jews became Thessaloniki, where the Spanish Jews soon outnumbered coreligionists of other nationalities and, at one time, the original native inhabitants.

Although the status of the Jews in the Ottoman Empire may have often been exaggerated, it is undeniable that they enjoyed tolerance. Under the millet system they were organized as a community on the basis of religion alongside the other millets (e.g. Eastern Orthodox millet, Armenian Apostolic millet, etc.). In the framework of the millet, they had a considerable amount of administrative autonomy and were represented by the Hakham Bashi, the Chief Rabbi. There were no restrictions in the professions Jews could practice analogous to those common in Western Christian countries. There were restrictions in the areas Jews could live or work, but such restrictions were imposed on Ottoman subjects of other religions as well.

Like all non-Muslims, Jews had to pay the haraç "head tax" and faced other restrictions in clothing, horse riding, army service etc., but they could occasionally be waived or circumvented. Jews who reached high positions in the Ottoman court and administration include Mehmed the Conqueror's Minister of Finance (Defterdar) Hekim Yakup Paşa, his Portuguese physician Moses Hamon, Murad II's physician İshak Paşa and Abraham de Castro, master of the mint in Egypt.

During the Classical Ottoman period (1300–1600), the Jews, together with most other communities of the empire, enjoyed a certain level of prosperity. Compared with other Ottoman subjects, they were the predominant power in commerce and trade as well in diplomacy and other high offices. In the 16th century especially, the Jews were the most prominent under the millets, the apogee of Jewish influence could arguably be the appointment of Joseph Nasi to sanjak-bey (governor, a rank usually only bestowed upon Muslims) of Naxos. Also in the first half of the 17th century the Jews were distinct in winning tax farms, Haim Gerber describes it: "My impression is that no pressure existed, that it was merely performance that counted."

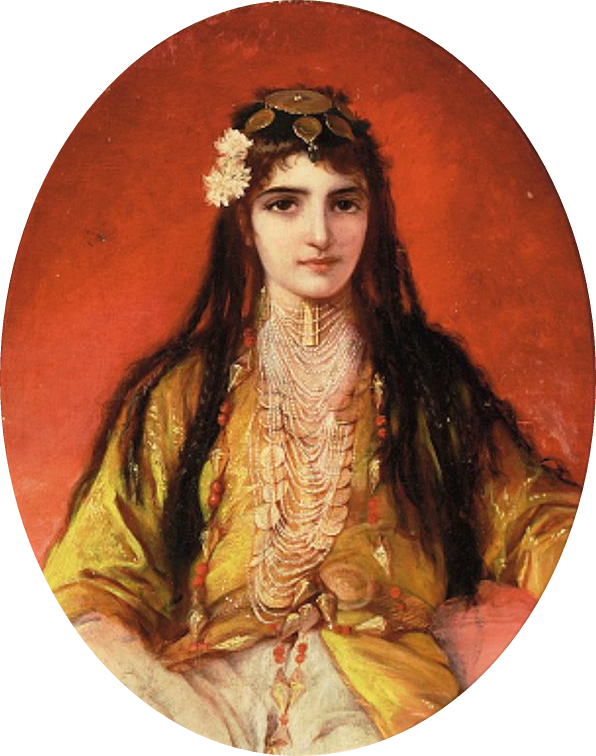
Zarina, a Jewish woman from Smyrna, 19th-century painting by Elisabeth Jerichau-Baumann

Friction between Jews and Turks was less common than in the Arab territories. Some examples: During the reign of Murad IV (1623–1640), the Jews of Jerusalem were persecuted by an Arab who had purchased the governorship of that city from the governor of the province. Under Mehmed IV (1649–1687), the 1660 destruction of Safed occurred.

An additional problem was Jewish ethnic divisions. They had come to the Ottoman Empire from many lands, bringing with them their own customs and opinions, to which they clung tenaciously, and had founded separate congregations. Another tremendous upheaval was caused when Sabbatai Zevi claimed to be the Messiah. He was eventually caught by the Ottoman authorities and when given the choice between death and conversion, he opted for the latter; his remaining disciples also converted. Their descendants are today known as Dönmeh.

The history of the Jews in Turkey in the 18th and 19th century is principally a chronicle of decline in influence and power; they lost their influential positions in trade mainly to the Greeks, who were able to "capitalize on their religio-cultural ties with the West and their trading diaspora". An exception to this is Daniel de Fonseca, who was chief court physician and played a certain political role. He is mentioned by Voltaire, who speaks of him as an acquaintance whom he esteemed highly. Fonseca was involved in negotiations with Charles XII of Sweden.

Ottoman Jews held a variety of views on the role of Jews in the Ottoman Empire, from loyal Ottomanism to Zionism. Emmanuel Carasso, for example, was a founding member of the Young Turks, and believed that the Jews of the Empire should be Turks first, and Jews second.

As mentioned before, the overwhelming majority of the Ottoman Jews lived in Rumelia. As the Empire declined however, the Jews of these region found themselves under Christian rule. The Bosnian Jews for example came under Austro-Hungarian rule after the occupation of the region in 1878, the independence of Greece, Bulgaria and Serbia further lowered the number of Jews within the borders of the Ottoman Empire.

=== Rise of the Young Turks, the Committee for Union and Progress and Turkish War of Independence ===
Late Ottoman Dönmeh and other Jewish writers explicitly articulated an alliance between Jews and Muslims against common Christian enemies, including Armenians and Greeks. As such, several leading members of the Young Turks were Dönmeh. In the period preceding and succeeding World War I and in the Turkish War of Independence, Dönmeh and other Turkish Jews heavily supported the Committee for Union and Progress (CUP) and the Turkish National Movement. They were the only non-Turkish minority in the 1912 elections which, in its majority, did not support the CUP and opposed the Freedom and Accord Party.

During World War I and the Armenian Genocide, Dönmeh and other Jews remained muted, and self-interested. However, the Jewish underground group "Nili" was a unique exception, in that it sympathized with the Armenians. Some Dönmeh and other Jewish individuals helped rescue Armenians and donated to their relief aid, but others, affiliated with Turkish nationalists, helped the perpetrators find Armenian victims and also participated in the pillaging of Armenian homes, alongside Turks.

Immediately after World War I and the Allied victory, in November 1918, the Jewish Turkish nationalist Nesim Navaro tore down the Greek flag in Smyrna. Another Jewish Turkish nationalist tore down the Greek flag in Kadifekale. After the Greek landing at Smyrna in 1919, the Dönmeh Hasan Tahsin opened fire on Greek soldiers, killing a Greek standard-bearer, for which he was killed on the spot. He is commemorated as a war hero in Turkey. In Maşatlık, the Jewish cemetery became a protest center against the Occupation of Smyrna. Boaz Menaşe, when asked if Turkish Jews wanted the city to become Greek or remain Turkish, he answered that Turkish Jews want it to remain Turkish. In Bursa, the Jewish community refused to hoist Greek flags and skipped pro-Greek meetings. Meanwhile, many Jews hid Turkish nationalist soldiers in their houses and passed on key information to them. In addition, Benjamen Katan tried to block a Greek-sponsored autonomy petition in Bergama, alongside other Jews and Turks. After the end of the war, Mustafa Kemal Pasha thanked many rabbis and Jews for their assistance.

In 1923, during the compulsory population exchange between Greece and Turkey, the Dönme of Thessaloniki were classified as Muslims and relocated to Istanbul. There, a smaller but influential community emerged, including businessmen, newspaper publishers, industrialists, and diplomats, many of whom continued to thrive in Turkish society. In 1932, the Jewish Telegraphic Agency reported 15,000 Dönme in Istanbul.

=== Early republic ===
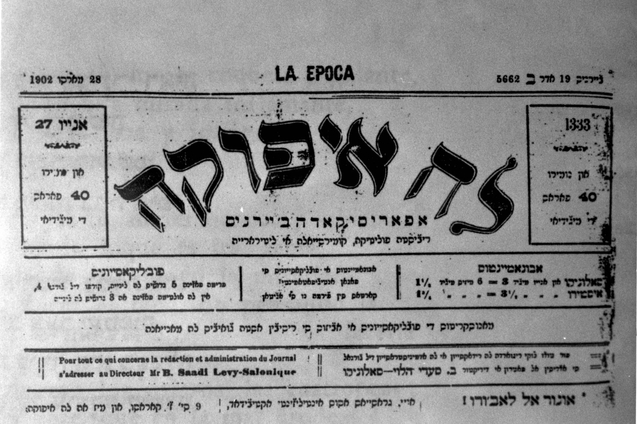
A 1902 Issue of La Epoca, a Ladino newspaper from Salonica (Thessaloniki) during the Ottoman Empire

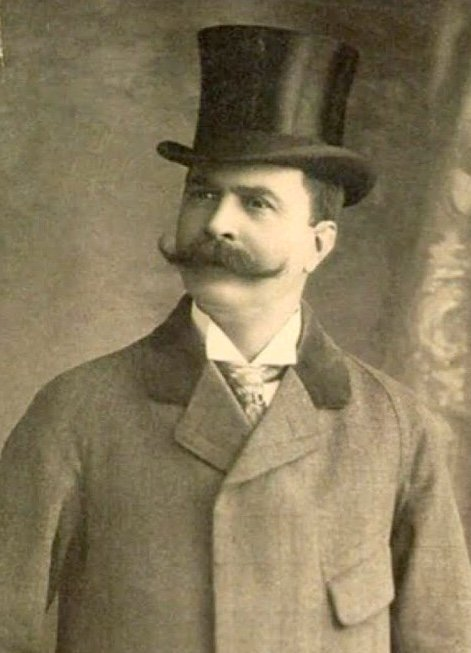
Morris Schinasi, Ottoman Jewish businessman, who immigrated to the United States in 1890

The Jewish population of Ottoman Empire had reached nearly 200,000 at the start of the 20th century. The territories lost between 1829 and 1913 to the new Christian Balkan states significantly lowered this number.

The troubled history of Turkey during the 20th century and the process of transforming the old Ottoman Empire into a secular nation state after 1923, however, had a negative effect on the size of all remaining minorities, including the Jews. After the foundation of the Turkish Republic in 1923, Mustafa Kemal Pasha's (Atatürk since 1934) Turkish nationalist policies, which had left ethnic and religious minorities in the lurch, were accompanied by antisemitic propaganda by nationalist publishers in the 1930s and 1940s.

One of the leaders of the supposed İzmir plot to assassinate President Atatürk in İzmir after the establishment of the Turkish Republic was a Dönme named Mehmed Cavid Bey, a founding member of the Committee of Union and Progress (CUP) and the former Minister of Finance of the Ottoman Empire. Convicted after a government investigation, Cavid Bey was hanged on 26 August 1926 in Ankara.

After 1933, a new law put into effect in Nazi Germany for mandatory retirement of officials from non-Aryan race. Thus, the law required all the Jewish scientists in Germany to be fired. Unemployed scientists led by Albert Einstein formed an association in Switzerland. Professor Schwartz, the general secretary of the association, met with the Turkish Minister of Education in order to provide jobs for 34 Jewish scientists in Turkish universities especially in Istanbul University.

In 1933, Turkey accepted more than 1000 Jews, most of whom were intellectuals and scientists, into Istanbul, contributing to the academia. They restructured the newly established Istanbul University, introducing European-style academic standards, research methods, and pedagogical practices. These émigrés trained a new generation of Turkish academics, doctors, lawyers, and engineers, significantly raising the quality of education and professional expertise. Beyond the sciences, they influenced cultural life, helping to modernize arts, architecture, and music education, and brought international intellectual perspectives that shaped public administration and social sciences. Ernst Hirsch, an exiled Jewish scholar and lawyer, helped the Turkish authorities in modernising Turkish contemporary law, which still carried some substantial remnants from the Ottoman code. He authored several textbooks that were used for years after the second world war. The acceptance of these intellectuals wasn't so much a humanitarian effort as it was the Turkish government's efforts to modernize and Westernize.

However, the planned deportation of Jews from East Thrace and the associated anti-Jewish pogrom in 1934 was one of the events that caused insecurity among the Turkish Jews. Before the start of the pogroms, İbrahim Tali Öngören, the Inspectorate General of the Trakya Inspectorate General, suggested to remove the Jews from the region as they presented an economic threat to the Muslim population. In 1934, the Turkish government expelled all the Jews from Edirne and the Straits.

The effect of the 1942 Varlık Vergisi ("Wealth Tax") was solely on non-Muslims – who still controlled the largest portion of the young republic's wealth – even though in principle it was directed against all wealthy Turkish citizens, it most intensely affected non-Muslims. The "wealth tax" is still remembered as a "catastrophe" among the non-Muslims of Turkey and it had one of the most detrimental effects on the population of Turkish Jews. Many people unable to pay the exorbitant taxes were sent to labor camps and in consequence about 30,000 Jews emigrated. The tax was seen as a racist attempt to diminish the economic power of religious minorities in Turkey.

=== World War II ===
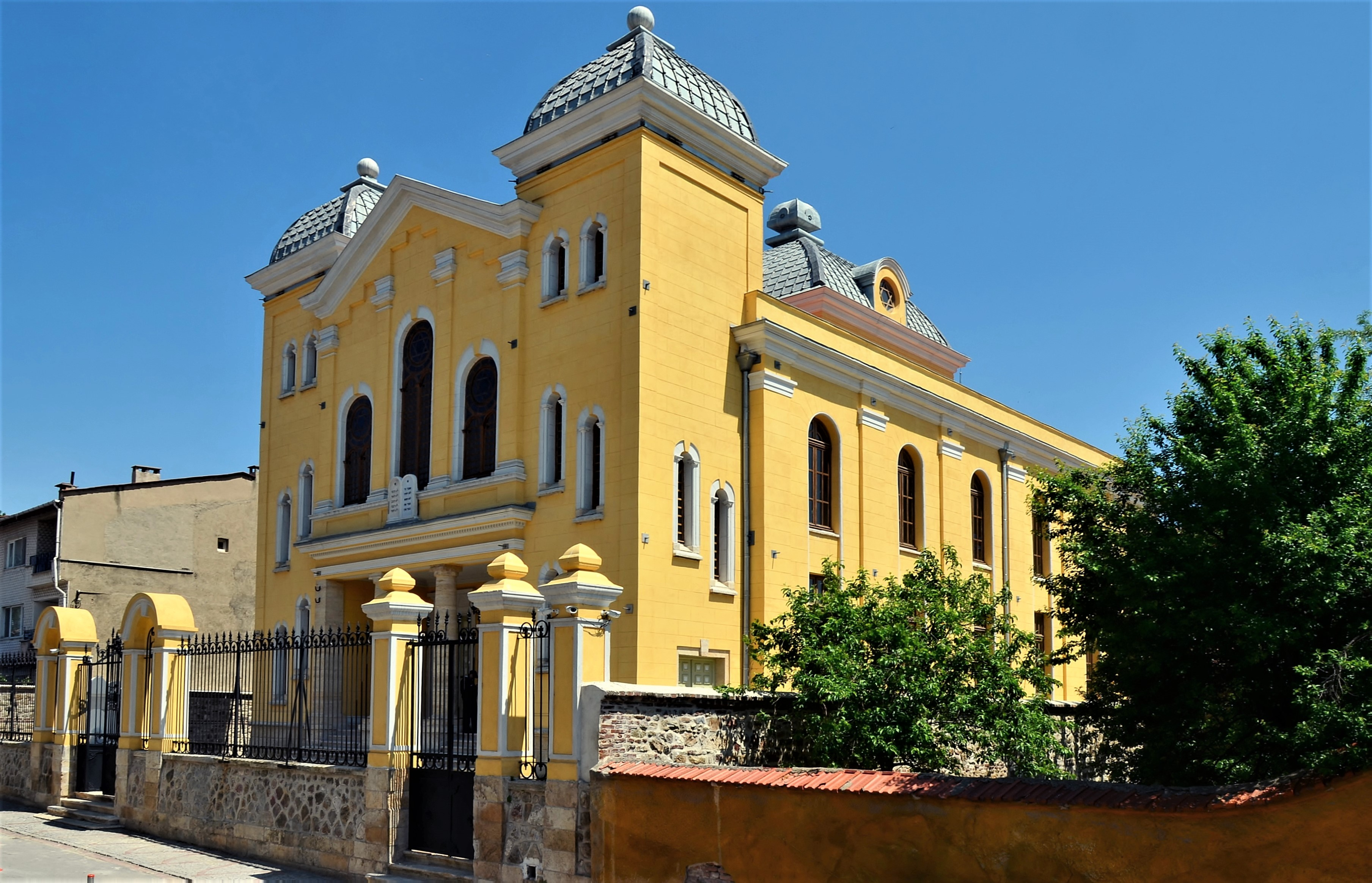
Grand Synagogue of Edirne

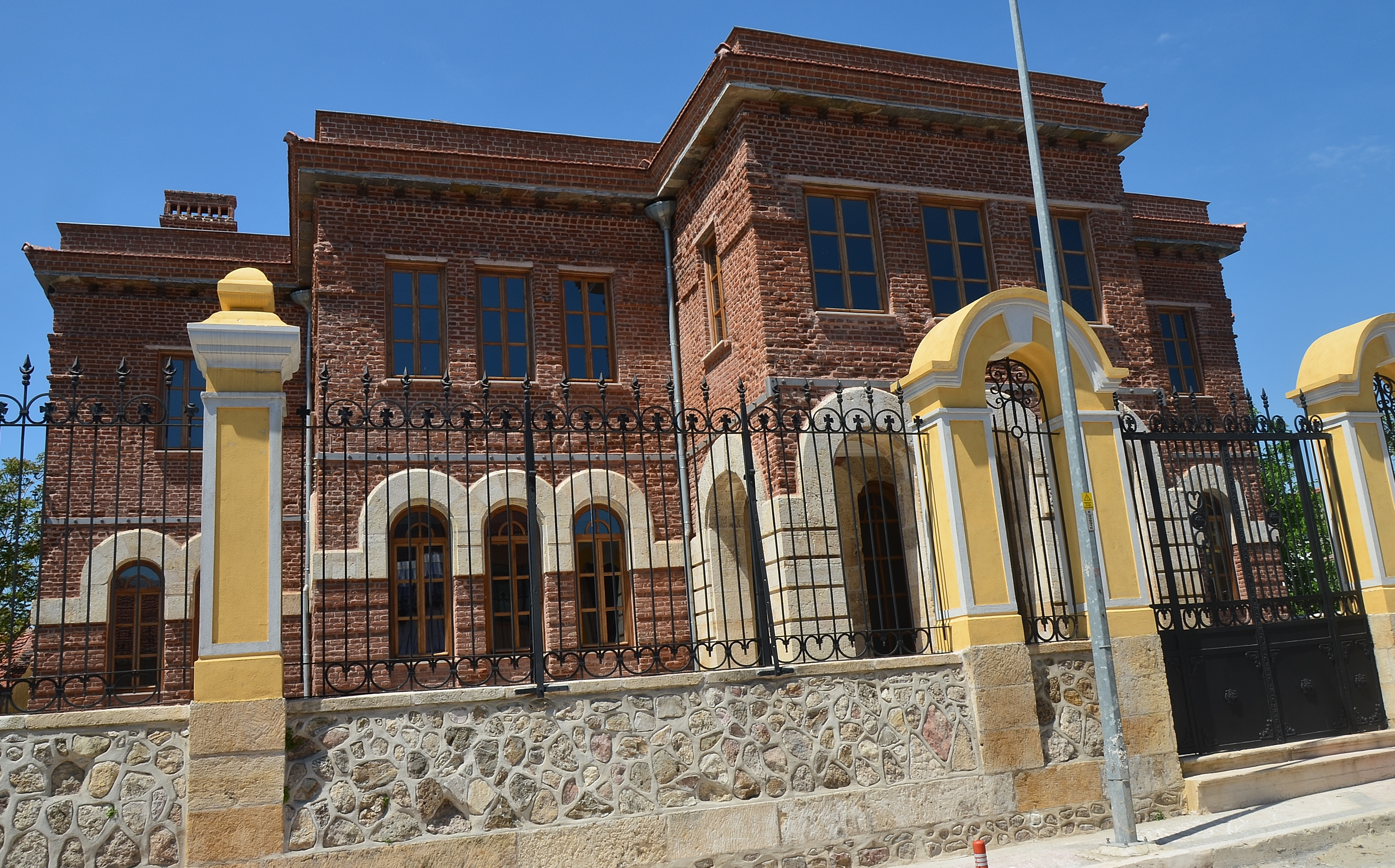
Administrative entrance to the Grand Synagogue of Edirne

During World War II, Turkey was officially neutral although it maintained strong diplomatic relations with Nazi Germany. During the war, Turkey denaturalized 3,000 to 5,000 Jews living abroad; 2,500 Turkish Jews were deported to Nazi concentration camps such as Auschwitz, Sobibor and other extermination camps. When Nazi Germany encouraged neutral countries to repatriate their Jewish citizens, Turkish diplomats received instructions to avoid repatriating Jews even if they could prove their Turkish nationality. Turkey was also the only neutral country to implement anti-Jewish laws during the war. More Turkish Jews suffered as a result of discriminatory policies during the war than were saved by Turkey. Although Turkey has promoted the idea that it was a rescuer of Jews during the Holocaust, this is considered a myth by historians. This myth has been used to promote Armenian genocide denial.

Turkey served as a transit for European Jews fleeing Nazi persecution during the 1930s and 1940s.

A memorial stone with a bronze epitaph was inaugurated in 2012, as the third of individual country memorials (after Poland and the Netherlands) at the Bergen-Belsen concentration camp for eight Turkish citizens killed during the Nazi regime in the said camp. The Turkish Ambassador to Berlin, Hüseyin Avni Karslıoğlu stated in an inauguration speech that Germany set free 105 Turkish citizens, held in camps, after a mutual agreement between the two countries, and these citizens returned to Turkey in April 1945, although there is no known official record for other Turkish Jews who died during the Holocaust in Nazi Germany.

According to Rıfat Bali, Turkish authorities bear some responsibility for the Struma disaster, killing about 781 Jewish refugees and 10 crew, due to their refusal to allow the Jewish refugees on board to disembark in Turkey. William Rubinstein goes further, citing British pressure on Turkey not to let Struma's passengers disembark, in accordance with Britain's White Paper of 1939 to prevent further Jewish immigration to Israel then-Palestine.

Important Turkish diplomats during the Holocaust

- Necdet Kent
- Selahattin Ülkümen
- Namık Kemal Yolga

=== Emigration from Turkey to Israel ===
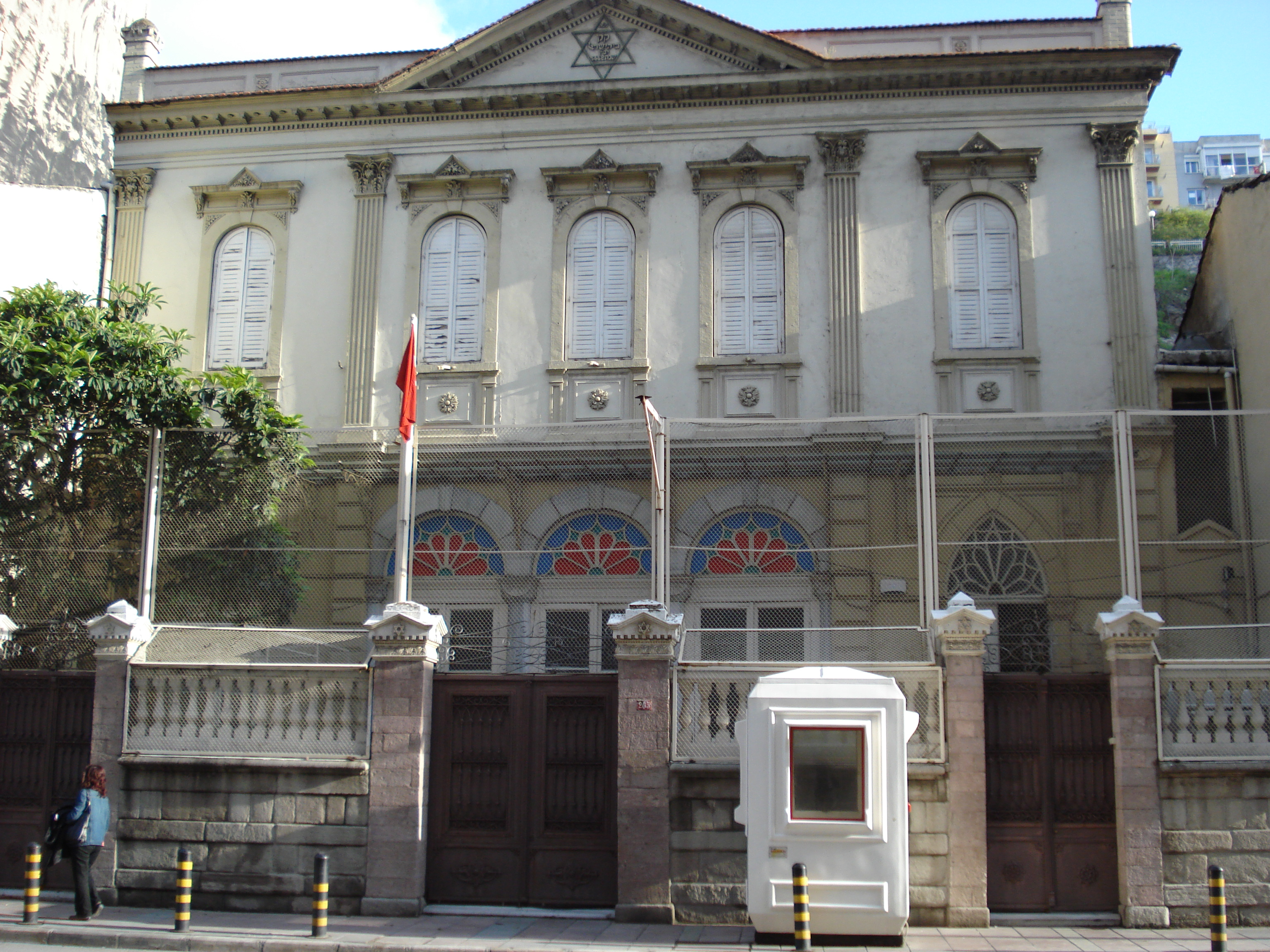
Bet Israel Synagogue (İzmir)

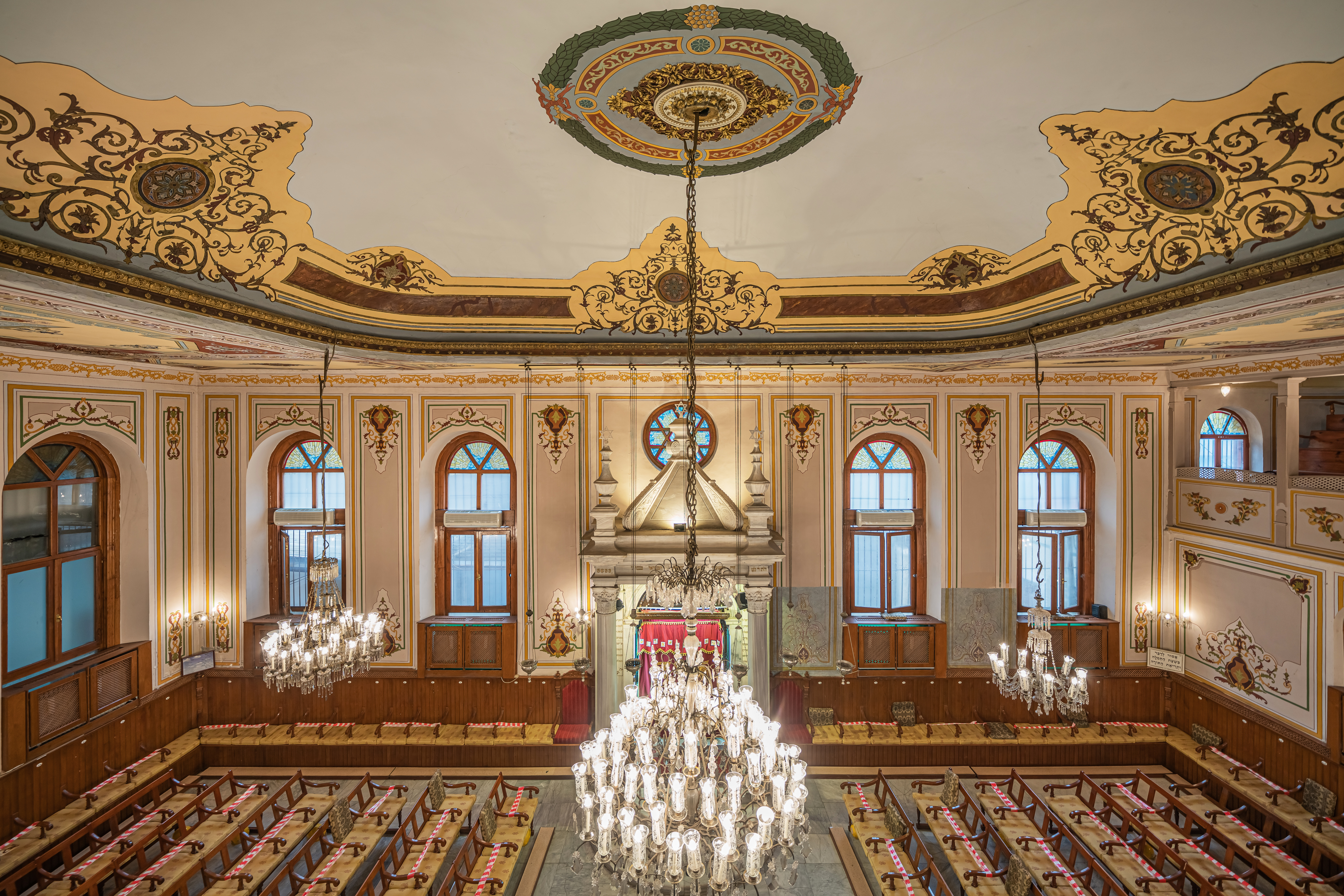
Hemdat Israel Synagogue

When the Republic of Turkey was established in 1923, Aliyah was not particularly popular amongst Turkish Jewry; migration from Turkey to Palestine was minimal in the 1920s.

Between 1923 and 1948, approximately 7,300 Jews emigrated from Turkey to Mandatory Palestine. After the 1934 Thrace pogroms following the 1934 Turkish Resettlement Law, it is estimated that 521 Jews left for Palestine from Turkey in 1934 and 1,445 left in 1935. However, although the Law on Settlement may well have actually provoked the incidents’ outbreak, the national authorities did not side with the attackers but immediately intervened in the incidents. After order was restored, the governors and mayors of the provinces involved were removed from office.

Immigration to Palestine was organized by the Jewish Agency and the Palestine Aliya Anoar Organization. The Varlık Vergisi, a capital tax which occurred in 1942, was also significant in encouraging emigration from Turkey to Palestine; between 1943 and 1944, 4,000 Jews emigrated.

The Jews of Turkey reacted very favorably to the creation of the State of Israel. Between 1948 and 1951, 34,547 Jews immigrated to Israel, nearly 40% of the Turkish Jewish population at the time. Immigration was stunted for several months in November 1948, when Turkey suspended migration permits as a result of pressure from Arab countries.

In 1949, Turkey officially recognized Israel, becoming the first Muslim-majority country to do so. Migration permits were reinstated and emigration continued, with 26,000 emigrating within the same year. The migration was entirely voluntary, and was primary driven by economic factors given the majority of emigrants were from the lower classes. In fact, the migration of Jews to Israel is the second largest mass emigration wave out of Turkey, the first being the Population exchange between Greece and Turkey.

After 1951, emigration of Jews from Turkey to Israel slowed perceptibly.

In the mid-1950s, 10% of those who had moved to Israel returned to Turkey. A new synagogue, the Neve Şalom, was constructed in Istanbul in 1951. Generally, Turkish Jews in Israel have integrated well into society and are not distinguishable from other Israelis. However, they maintain their Turkish culture and connection to Turkey, and are strong supporters of close relations between Israel and Turkey.

=== Democratic Party period ===
On the night of 6/7 September 1955, the Istanbul Pogrom was unleashed. Although primarily aimed at the city's Greek population, the Jewish and Armenian communities of Istanbul were also targeted to a degree. The damage caused was mainly material (over 4,000 shops and 1,000 houses belonging to Greeks, Armenians and Jews were destroyed) it deeply shocked minorities throughout the country.

=== 21st century ===
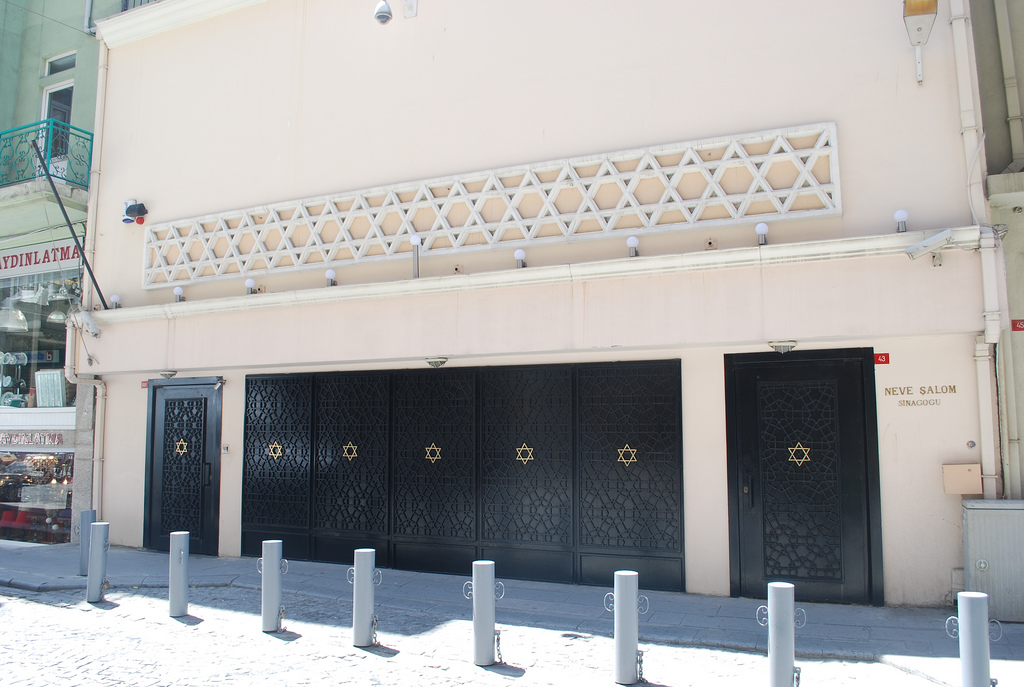
Neve Shalom Synagogue, completed in 1951 in the Galata district of Istanbul, Turkey

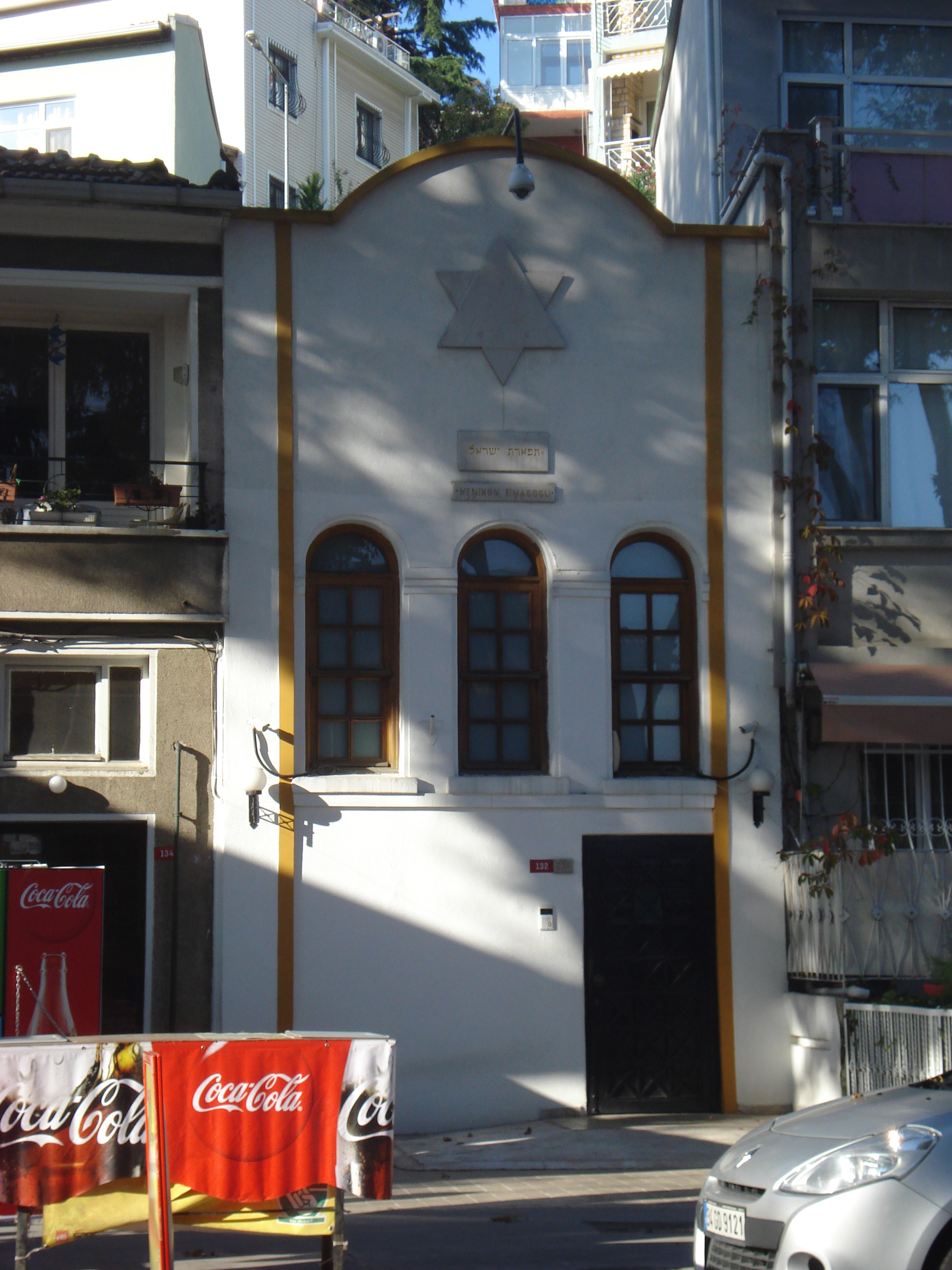
Yeniköy Synagogue in Istanbul

The present size of the Jewish community was estimated at 17,400 in 2012 according to the Jewish Virtual Library. The vast majority, approximately 95%, live in Istanbul, with a community of about 2,500 in İzmir, and until the 2023 Turkey–Syria earthquake, much smaller communities in Antakya and İskenderun. Sephardi Jews make up approximately 96% of Turkey's Jewish population, while the rest are primarily Ashkenazi Jews and Jews from Italian extraction. There is also a small community of Romaniote Jews and the community of the Constantinopolitan Karaites who are related to each other.

The city of Antakya, was home to ten Jewish families, numbering 20 members in 2014, many of whom were Syrian Jews of Mizrahi Jewish extraction, having originally come from Aleppo, Syria, 2,500 years ago. Figures were once higher but families have left for Istanbul, Israel and other countries.

Turkish Jews are still legally represented by the Hakham Bashi, the Chief Rabbi. Rabbi Ishak Haleva is assisted by a religious council made up of a Rosh Bet Din and three Hahamim. 35 lay counselors look after the secular affairs of the community and an executive committee of fourteen, the president of which must be elected from among the lay counselors, runs the daily affairs. The Istanbul community also has 16 synagogues and well kept and guarded cemetery.

In 2001, the Jewish Museum of Turkey was founded by the Quincentennial Foundation, an organisation established in 1982 consisting of 113 Turkish citizens, both Jews and Muslims, to commemorate the 500th anniversary of the arrival of the Sephardic Jews to the Ottoman Empire.

The Turkish-Jewish population is experiencing a population decline, due to both large-scale immigration to Israel out of fear of antisemitism, but also because of natural population decline. Intermarriage with Turkish Muslims and assimilation have become common, and the community's death rate is more than twice that of its birth rate.

As of 2022, the Jewish population in Turkey is around 14,500.

In the 2023 Turkey–Syria earthquake, the leaders of the Jewish community of Antakya were killed, the Antakya Synagogue was badly damaged, and the entire Jewish community, numbering 14 members, was evacuated from Antakya.

== Languages ==
Late 20th – early 21st century language distribution. • Turkish • Arabic speakers are shown by religious affiliation: Alawite (circle), Christian (triangle), Sunni (square), Bedouin Sunni (rectangle), Jewish (rhombus).

The Jewish community in Turkey was linguistically diverse. Sephardic Jews spoke Judaeo-Spanish (Ladino) and French was used as a prestige language in the community. Sephardic Jews completely shifted to Turkish after the foundation of the Republic of Turkey. Ashkenazi Jews spoke Yiddish or French and similarly shifted to Turkish. In Istanbul, many Jews would also speak Greek or Armenian until the mid 20th century given the city's ethnic diversity. Jews in Hatay spoke Levantine Arabic. The 11 Jewish communities in Turkish Kurdistan spoke Kurdish but the community doesn't exist anymore.

Jews and their linguistic rights are officially recognized as a minority in Turkey by the 1923 Treaty of Lausanne. According to this Treaty, officially recognized minorities (Armenians, Greeks and Jews) can use their mother tongue freely, especially for education purposes. At the time, the mother tongue of the majority of Turkish Jews was Ladino. French was also the medium of instruction in most Jewish schools run by the Alliance Israélite Universelle in the Ottoman Empire. However, the Turkish government considered that, for the purpose of the Treaty of Lausanne, the mother tongue of Jews was Hebrew, and therefore only allowed teaching in Hebrew. The Ministry of National Education refused to change its decision despite requests from the Jewish community. For that reason, Jewish schools switched from French to Turkish.

== Antisemitism ==
According to researchers at Tel Aviv University, antisemitism in the media and books was creating a situation in which young, educated Turks formed negative opinions against Jews and Israel. Moreover, violence against Jews has also occurred. In 2003, an Istanbul dentist was murdered in his clinic by a man who admitted that he committed the crime out of antisemitic sentiment. In 2009, a number of Jewish students suffered verbal abuse and physical attacks, and a Jewish soldier in the Turkish Army was assaulted.

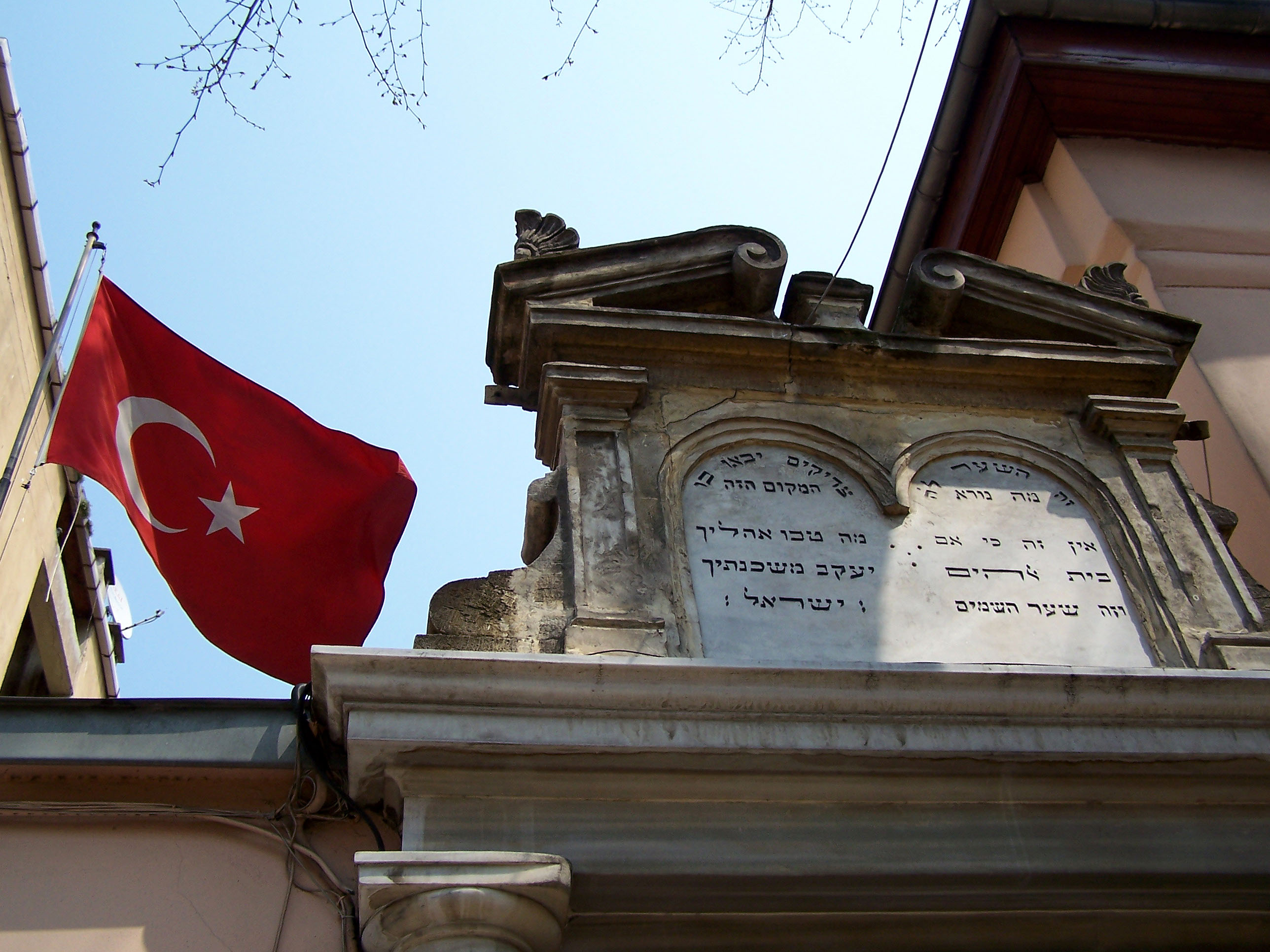
Bet Yaakov Synagogue was built in 1878 at the Kuzguncuk district of Istanbul.

The Neve Shalom Synagogue in Istanbul has been attacked three times. First on 6 September 1986, Arab terrorists gunned down 22 Jewish worshippers and wounded 6 during Shabbat services at Neve Shalom. This attacked was blamed on the Palestinian militant Abu Nidal. The Synagogue was hit again during the 2003 Istanbul bombings alongside the Beth Israel Synagogue, killing 20 and injuring over 300 people, both Jews and Muslims alike. Even though a local Turkish militant group, the Great Eastern Islamic Raiders' Front, claimed responsibility for the attacks, police claimed the bombings were "too sophisticated to have been carried out by that group", with a senior Israeli government source saying: "the attack must have been at least coordinated with international terror organizations".

Traditionally, aliyah from Turkey to Israel has been low since the 1950s. Despite the antisemitism and occasional violence, Jews felt generally safe in Turkey. In the 2000s, despite surging antisemitism, including antisemitic incidents, aliyah remained low. In 2008, only 112 Turkish Jews emigrated, and in 2009, that number only rose to 250. However, in the aftermath of the 2010 Gaza flotilla raid, antisemitism in Turkey increased and became more open, and it was reported that the community was also subjected to economic pressure. A boycott of Jewish businesses, especially textile businesses, took place, and Israeli tourists who had frequented the businesses of Turkish Jewish merchants largely stopped visiting Turkey. As a result, the number of Turkish Jews immigrating to Israel increased. In addition to safety concerns, some Turkish Jews also immigrated to Israel to find a Jewish spouse due to the increasing difficulty of finding one in the small Turkish Jewish community. In 2012, it was reported that the number of Jews expressing interest in moving to Israel rose by 100%, a large number of Jewish business owners were seeking to relocate their businesses to Israel, and that hundreds were moving every year.

In October 2013, it was reported that a mass exodus of Turkish Jews was underway. Reportedly, Turkish Jewish families are immigrating to Israel at the rate of one family per week on average, and hundreds of young Turkish Jews are also relocating to the United States and Europe. In 2022 the Jewish population in Turkey was 14,500 In 2024 the Jewish population in Turkey was 14,300

== Turkey and Israel ==
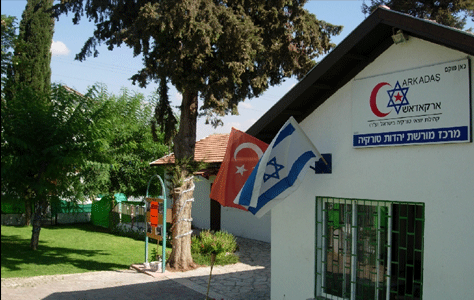
Arkadaş Association in Yehud, Israel

Turkey was among the first countries to formally recognize the State of Israel. Turkey and Israel have closely cooperated militarily and economically. Israel and Turkey have signed a multibillion-dollar project to build a series of pipelines from Turkey to Israel to supply gas, oil and other essentials to Israel. In 2003 the Arkadaş Association was established in Israel. The Arkadaş Association is a Turkish–Jewish cultural center in Yehud, aiming to preserve the Turkish-Jewish heritage and promote friendship (Arkadaş being the Turkish word for Friend) between the Israeli and Turkish people. In 2004, the Ülkümen-Sarfati Society was established by Jews and Turks in Germany. The society, named after Selahattin Ülkümen and Yitzhak Sarfati, aims to promote intercultural and interreligious dialogue and wants to inform the public of the centuries of peaceful coexistence between Turks and Jews.

== Diaspora ==
The various migrations outside of Turkey has produced descendants of Turkish Jews in Europe, Israel, United States, and Canada. Today, there are still various synagogues that maintain Jewish-Turkish traditions.

The Sephardic Synagogue Sephardic Bikur Holim in Seattle, Washington, was formed by Jews from Turkey, and still uses Ladino in some portions of the Shabbat services. They created a siddur called Zehut Yosef, written by Hazzan Isaac Azose, to preserve their unique traditions.

In recent years, several hundred Turkish Jews, who have been able to prove that they are descended from Jews expelled from Portugal in 1497, have emigrated to Portugal and acquired Portuguese citizenship.

== Notable Turkish Jews ==
=== Academia ===
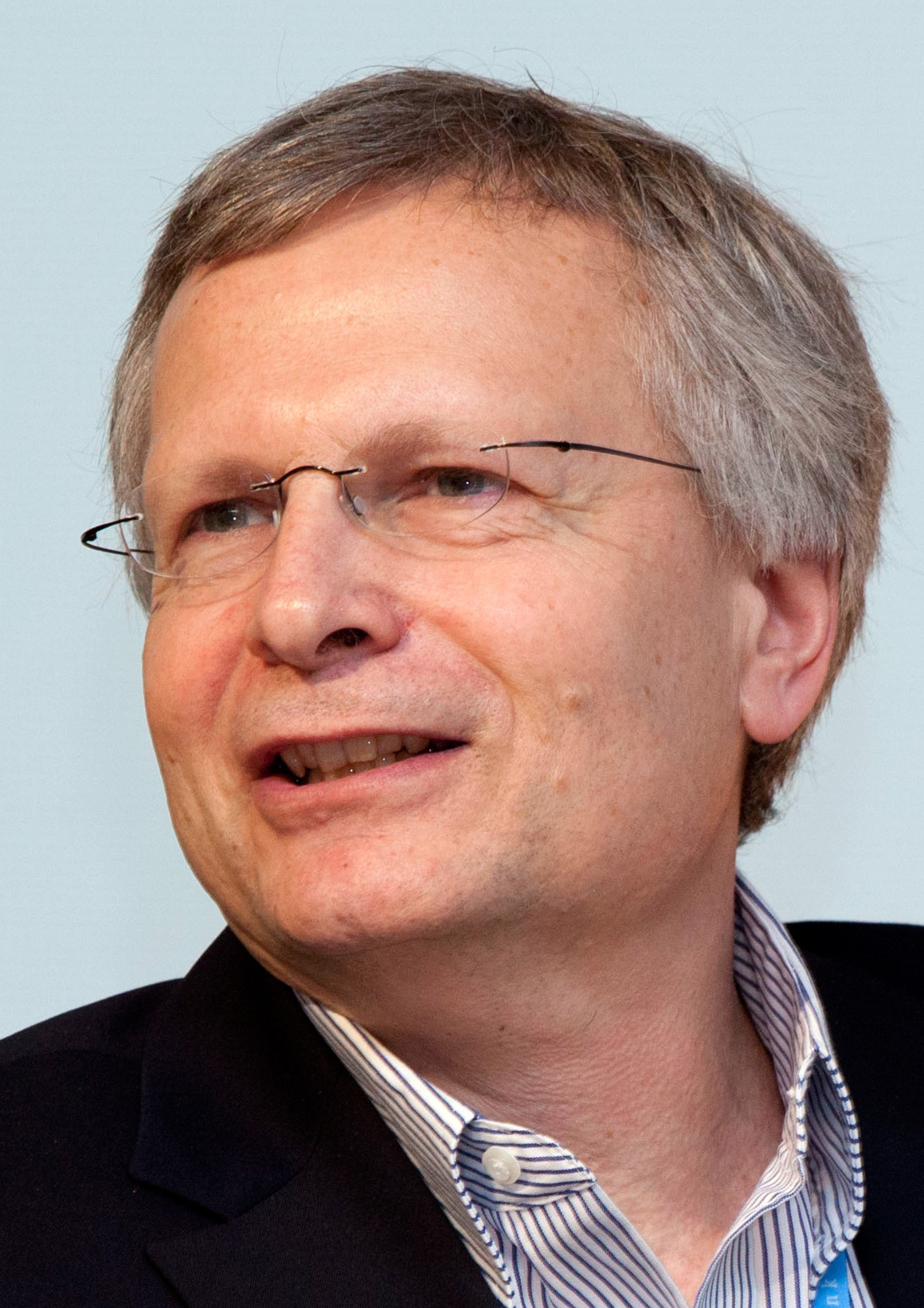
Dani Rodrik, Turkish economist and professor at Harvard University

- Maír José Benardete (1895–1989), Ottoman-born American scholar of Sephardic studies; professor at Brooklyn College
- Ruth Behar (born 1956), Cuban-American anthropologist; professor at the University of Michigan
- José Benardete (1928–2016), American philosopher; professor of philosophy at Syracuse University
- Seth Benardete (1930–2001), American classicist; professor New York University and The New School
- Doron Ben-Atar (born 1957), American historian and playwright; professor of history at Fordham University
- Seyla Benhabib (born 1950), Turkish-born American political theorist; professor at Columbia Law School
- Edit Doron (1951–2019), Israeli linguist; professor at Hebrew University of Jerusalem
- Lois Ellen Frank (born 1960), American food historian; professor at the Institute of American Indian Arts
- Yomtov Garti (1915–2011), Turkish mathematician and a teacher of mathematics, physics and cosmography
- John Gerassi (1931–2012), French-American professor, journalist and political activist
- Joseph Halévy (1827–1917), French orientalist and traveller; professor of Ethiopic in the École pratique des hautes études; librarian of the Société Asiatique
- Israel Hanukoglu (born 1952), Turkish-born Israeli biochemist; professor at Ariel University; former science and technology adviser to the prime minister of Israel (1996–1999)
- Yossef H. Hatzor (born 1959), Israeli professor of Earth and Environmental Sciences at the Ben-Gurion University of the Negev
- Jaklin Kornfilt (c. 1940s), Turkish theoretical linguist and professor at Syracuse University; known for her contributions to the fields of Turkish language and grammar, and Turkic language typology
- Miriam Lichtheim (1914–2004), Turkish-born American-Israeli Egyptologist, academic, librarian and translator
- Jacob L. Moreno (1889–1974), Romanian-American psychiatrist; the founder of psychodrama; pioneer of group psychotherapy
- Jonathan D. Moreno (born 1952), American philosopher and historian; professor at the University of Pennsylvania
- Aron Rodrigue (born 1957), Turkish-born American professor in Jewish Culture and History at Stanford University
- Dani Rodrik (born 1957), Turkish economist and professor at Harvard University
- Nathan Salmon (born 1951), American philosopher; professor at the University of California, Santa Barbara
- Ishak Saporta (born 1957), Israeli professor of business ethics at Tel Aviv University
- Simon Schama (born 1945), English historian and television presenter; professor at Columbia University

=== Arts and entertainment ===
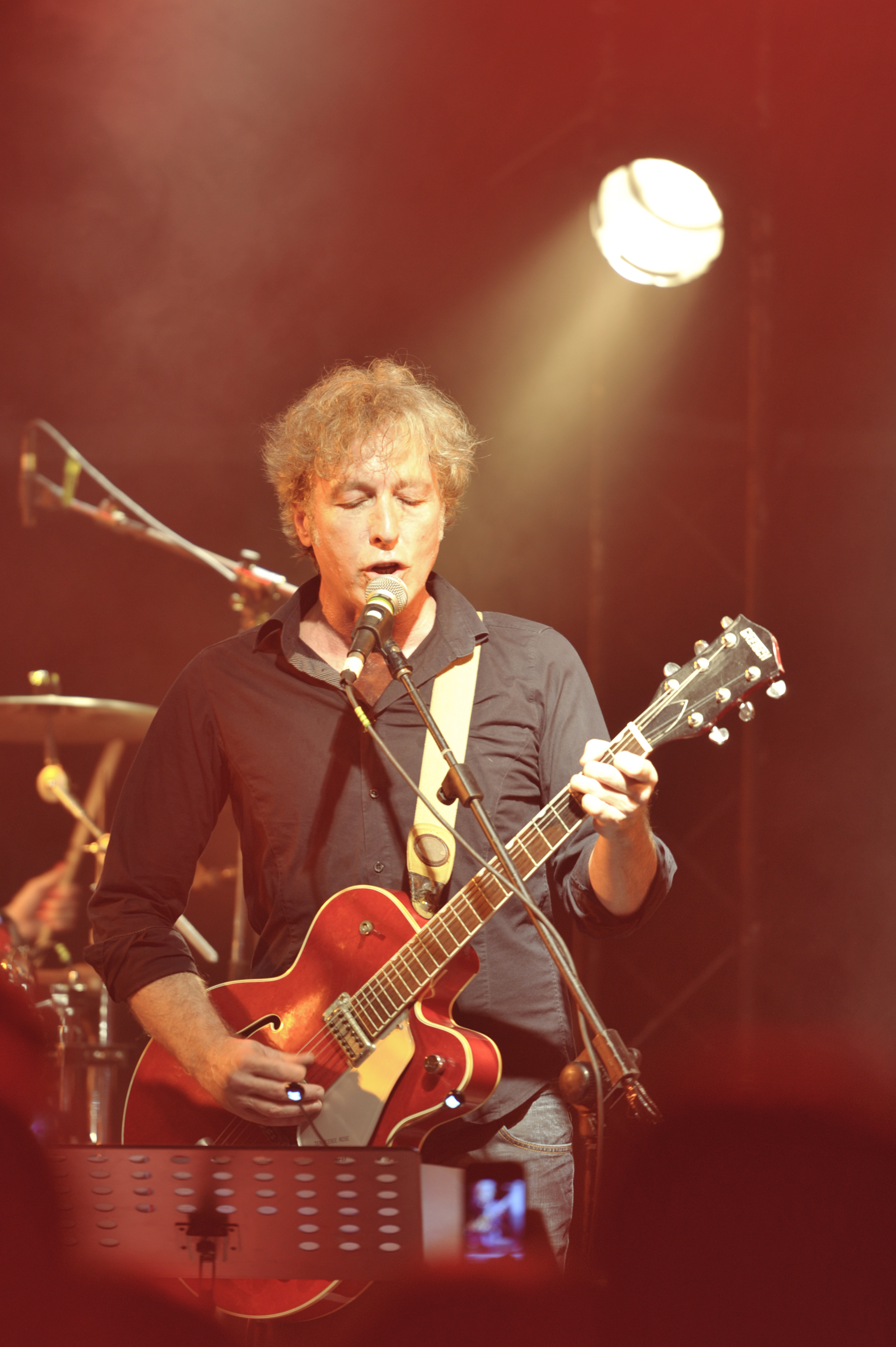
Berry Sakharof, Israeli rock singer and guitarist

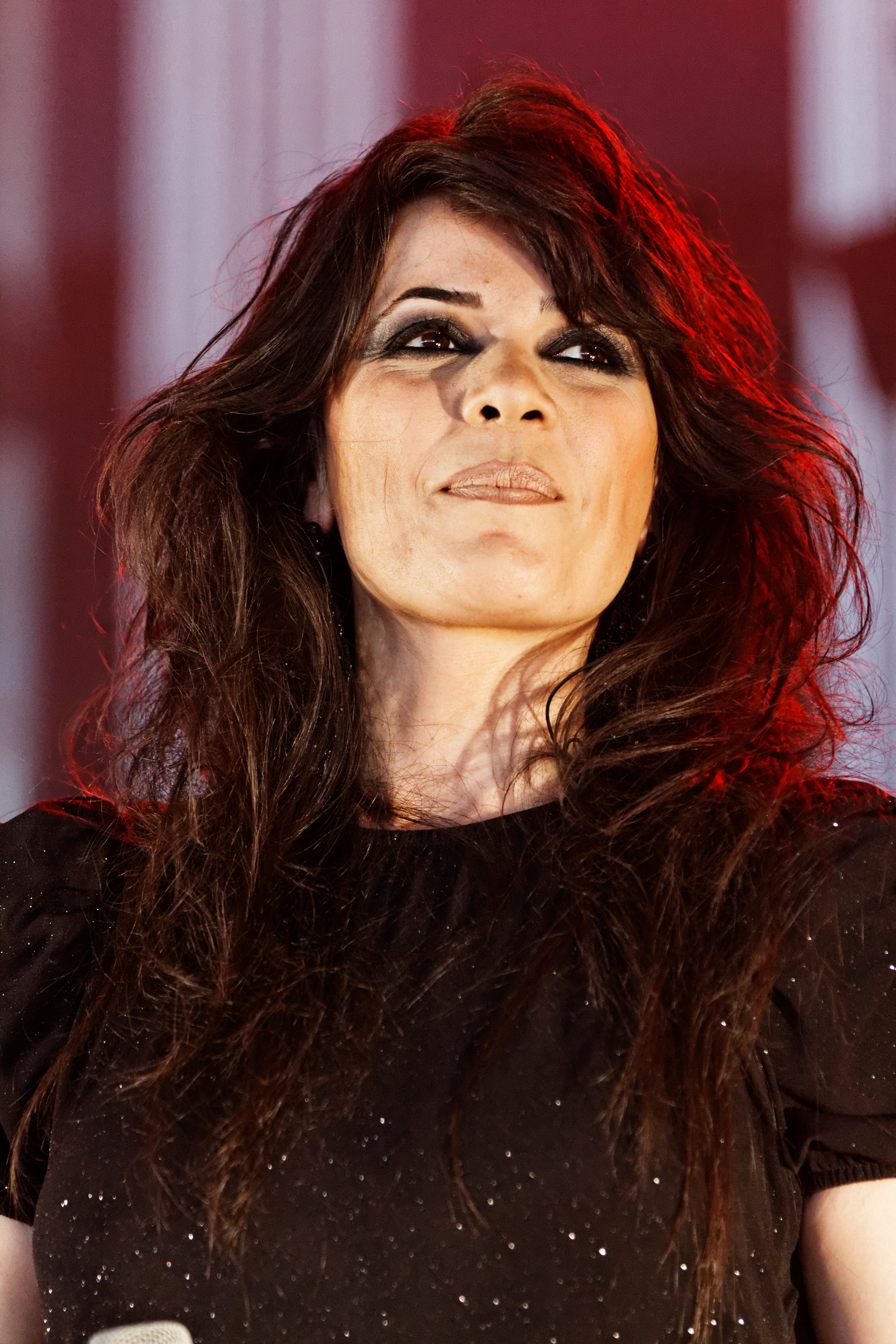
Yasmin Levy, Ladino singer

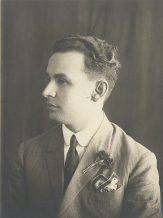
Alberto Hemsi, composer

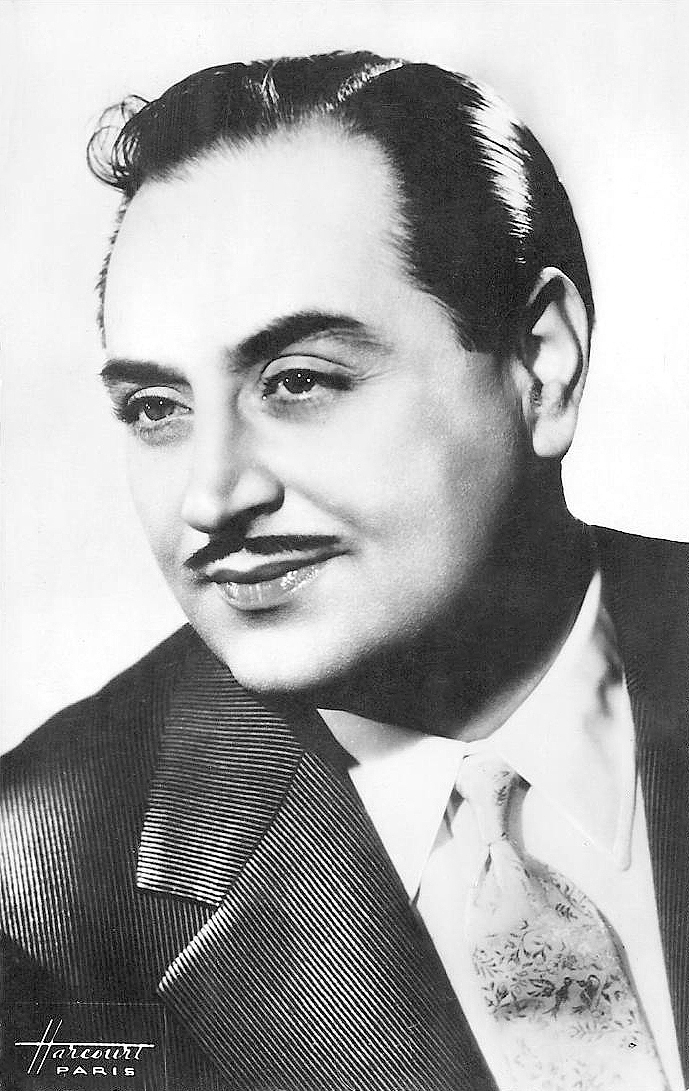
Dario Moreno, Turkish singer

- Maurice Abravanel (1903–1993), Ottoman-born American classical music conductor
- Anjelika Akbar (born 1969), Turkish composer, pianist and writer
- Philip Arditti (born 1979), Turkish theatre and television actor
- Adi Ashkenazi (born 1975), Israeli actress, screenwriter and stand-up comedian
- Lior Ashkenazi (born 1968), Israeli actor, voice actor, comedian and television presenter
- Mili Avital (born 1972), Israeli actress
- Aki Avni (born 1967), Israeli actor, entertainer and television host
- Hank Azaria (born 1964), is an American actor and producer
- Jeff Baena (born 1977–), American screenwriter and film director
- Kathy Barr (1929–2008), American vocalist
- Albert Beger (born 1959), Istanbul-born Israeli saxophonist and flutist
- Bea Benaderet (1906–1968), American actress
- Albert Bitran (1931–2018), French painter and sculptor
- Can Bonomo (born 1987), Turkish singer who represented Turkey in the Eurovision Song Contest 2012
- Assi Cohen (born 1974), Israeli comedian and actor
- Sacha Distel (1933–2004), French musician
- Bob Dylan (born 1941), American singer and songwriter; 2016 Nobel Prize in Literature winner
- Jesse Dylan (born 1966), American film director and production executive
- Roza Eskenazi (1890 – 1980), Istanbul-born Greek dancer and singer of rebetiko
- Savi Gabizon (born 1960), Israeli filmmaker, screenwriter and producer
- Yehoram Gaon (born 1939), Israeli singer, actor, director, comedian, producer, television and radio host
- Miki Gavrielov (born 1949), Israeli composer
- Fernando Gerassi (1899–1974), Turkish-born American artist
- Eydie Gormé (1928–2013), American singer
- Isaac Guillory (1947–2000), American folk guitarist
- Sienna Guillory (born 1975), English actress and former model
- Emma Kingston (born 1991), British stage actress
- Lainie Kazan (born 1940), American actress and singer
- Alberto Hemsi (1898–1975), Turkish-born French composer
- Victoria Kamhi (c. 1905–1997), Turkish pianist
- Tchéky Karyo (1953–2025), French actor and musician
- Victor Laredo (1910–2003), American documentary photographer
- Shaily Lipa (born 1974), Israeli cookbook author, content creator and TV cookery show host
- Sami Levi (born 1981), Turkish soloist of the Turkish band Sefarad
- Kohava Levy (born 1946), Israeli singer, songwriter, composer and poet in Ladino
- Yasmin Levy (born 1975), Israeli Ladino singer and songwriter
- Yitzhak Levy (1919–1977), Israeli singer, songwriter, musicologist and composer in Ladino
- Linet (born 1975), Turkish-Israeli singer
- Art Metrano (1936–2001), American actor
- Paul Misraki (1908–1998), French composer
- Darío Moreno (1921–1968), Turkish polyglot singer
- Eliad Nachum (born 1990), Israeli singer, songwriter and television actor
- Germaine Poliakov (1918–2020), French music teacher and Holocaust survivor
- Jacques Rémy (1911–1981), French screenwriter
- Berry Sakharof (born 1957), Israeli rock guitarist, singer, songwriter and producer
- Rudolph Schildkraut (1862–1930), Austrian film and theatre actor
- Altina Schinasi (1907–1999), American sculptor, filmmaker, actress and inventor
- Neil Sedaka (born 1939), American singer, songwriter and pianist
- Rotem Sela (born 1983), Israeli actress best known for starring in the Israeli television series Beauty and the Baker (2013–2021)
- Shlomi Shabat (born 1954), Israeli vocalist and musician
- Cem Stamati (born 1981), bass guitar player of the Turkish band Sefarad
- Alona Tal (born 1983), Israeli actress and singer
- Roy Gokay Wol (born 1984), Turkish-Israeli film producer and director
- Ed Wynn (1886–1966), American actor and comedian
- Keenan Wynn (1916–1986), American character actor
- Ned Wynn (1941–2020), American actor and screenwriter

=== Business ===
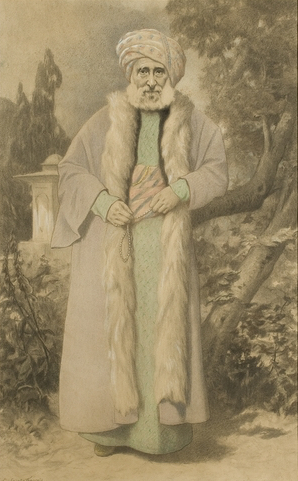
Abraham Salomon Camondo, Ottoman financier and philanthropist; patriarch of the House of Camondo

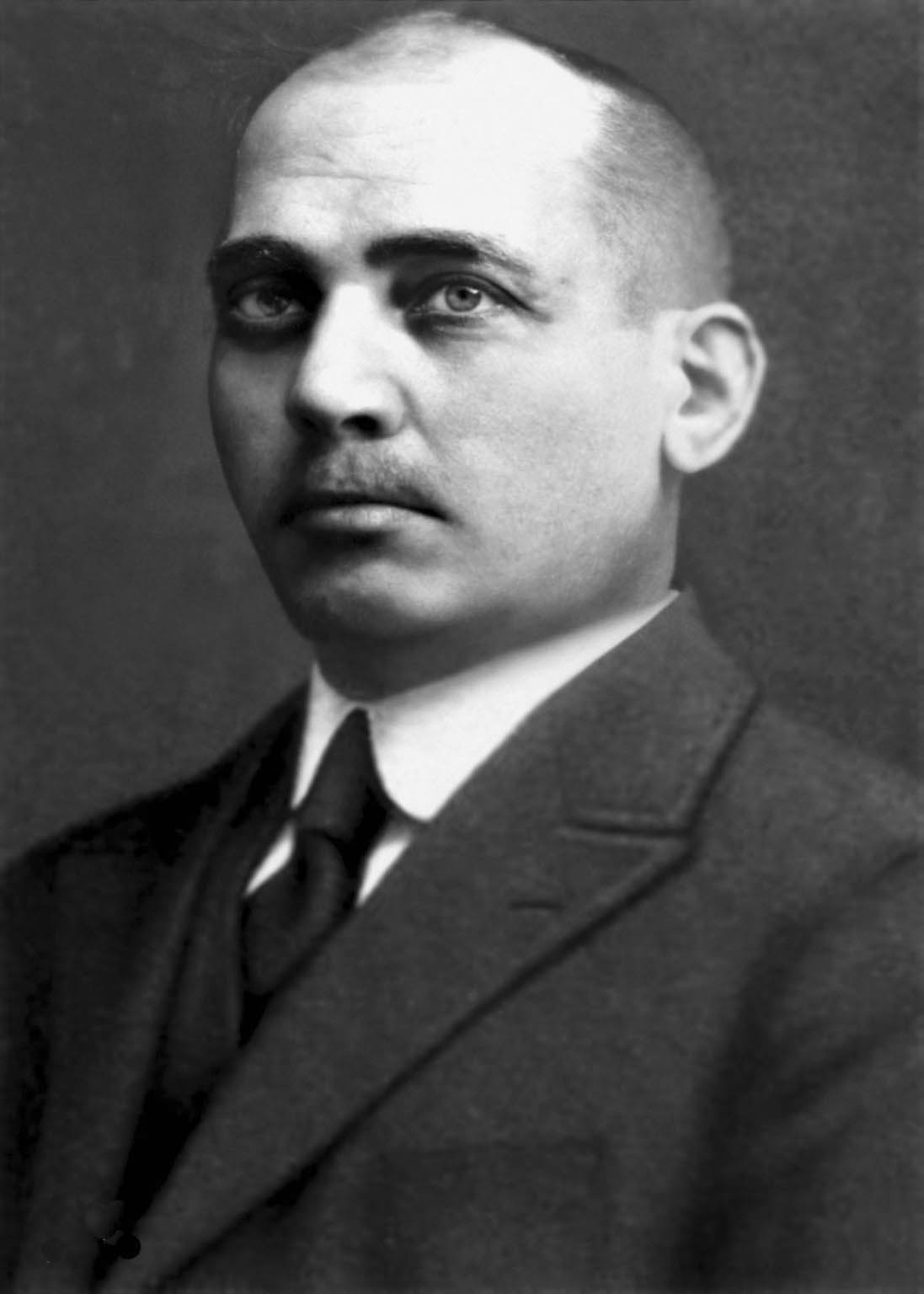
Isaac Carasso, founder of Groupe Danone

- Ishak Alaton (1927–2016), Turkish businessman and co-founder of Alarko Holding
- Leyla Alaton (born 1961), Turkish businesswoman and art collector, board member of Alarko and Alvimedica
- Isak Andic (1953–2024), Turkish-Spanish businessman and co-founder of clothing retailer Mango
- Howard Behar (born 1944), American businessman; president of Starbucks Coffee Company International
- Abraham Salomon Camondo (1781–1873), Ottoman financier and philanthropist; patriarch of the House of Camondo
- Isaac de Camondo (1851–1911), Ottoman-born French businessman and art collector
- Moïse de Camondo (1860–1935), Ottoman-born French banker and art collector
- Isaac Carasso (1874–1939), Ottoman-born Spanish businessman; founder of Groupe Danone; member of Carasso family
- Giuseppe Eskenazi (born 1939), Turkish businessman and Chinese art dealer; founder of Eskenazi
- Üzeyir Garih (1929–2001), Turkish businessman and co-founder of Alarko Holding
- Cem Hakko (born 1955), Turkish businessman and president of Vakko
- Vitali Hakko (1913–2007), Turkish businessman, founder of the Vakko
- Jeffi Medina (born 1950), Turkish businessman and co-founder of Medina Turgul DDB; former president of Advertising Association of Turkey
- Gracia Mendes Nasi (1510–1569), Ottoman-Portuguese philanthropist, businesswoman, and member of the Mendes Benveniste family; one of the wealthiest and most influential women of Renaissance Europe; known for securing a long-term lease of Tiberias in the Safed sanjak (modern day Israel) from Suleiman the Magnificent
- Silvio Santos (1930–2024), Brazilian media mogul and television host
- Morris Schinasi (1855–1928), Ottoman-born American businessman in the tobacco industry
- Izak Senbahar (born 1959), American real estate developer

=== Politics, military and government ===
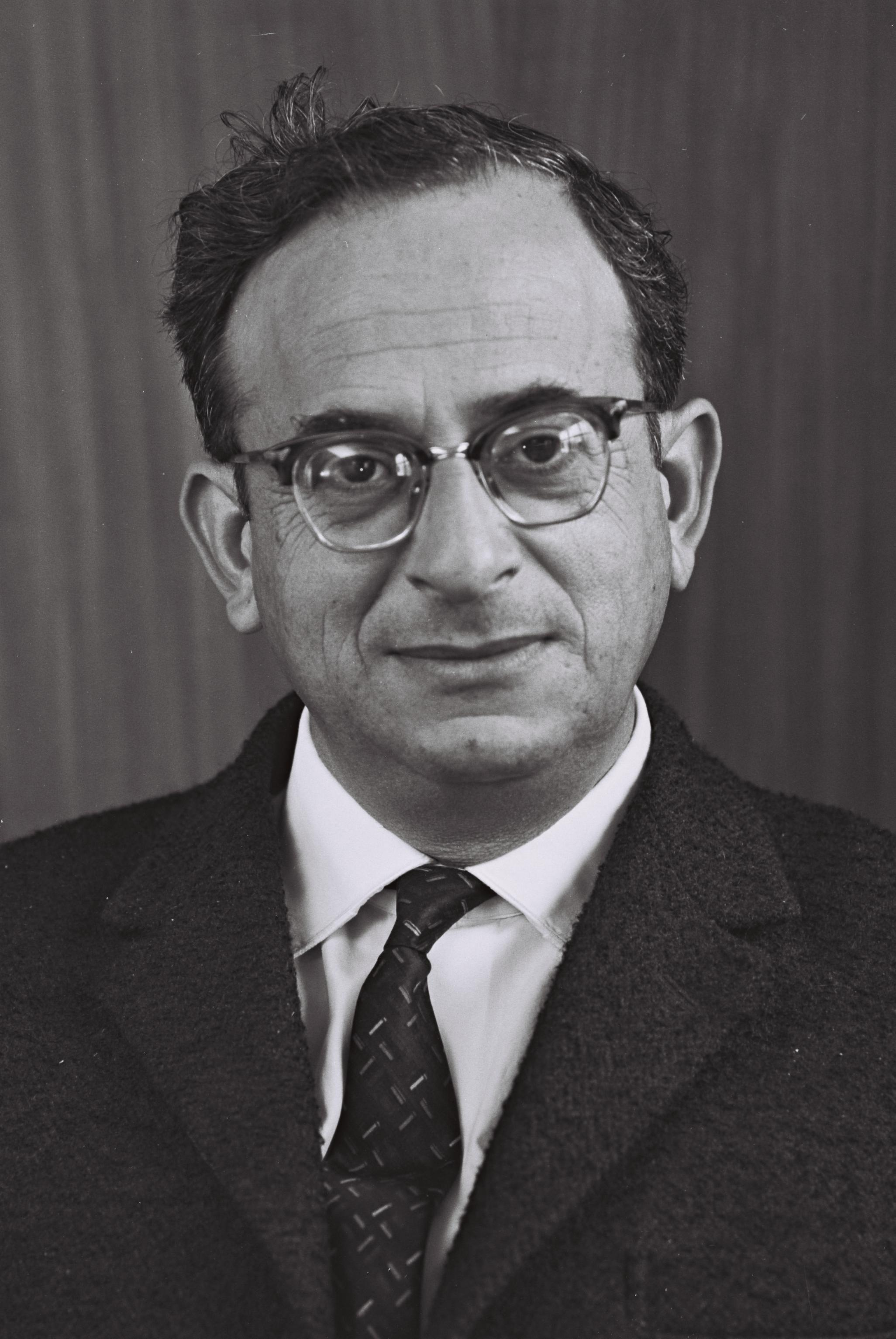
Yitzhak Navon, President of Israel from 1978 to 1983

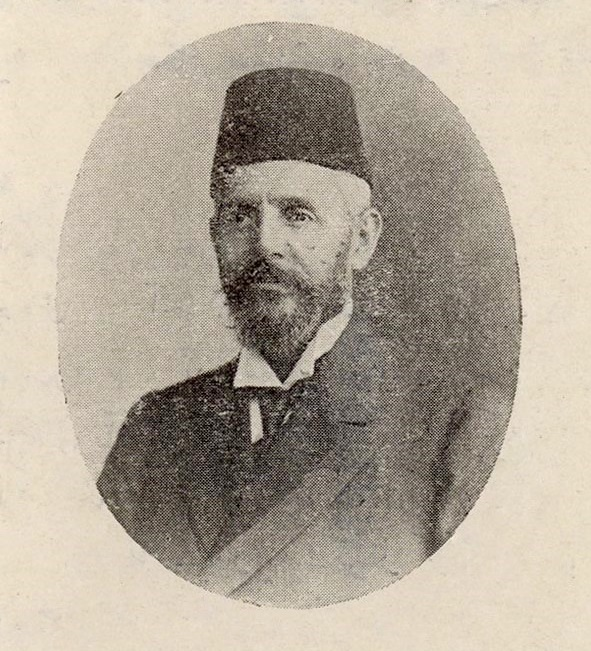
Emmanuel Carasso, Ottoman lawyer and member of the Ottoman Chamber of Deputies

- Avichay Adraee (born 1982), Israeli military officer; head of the Arab media division of the IDF Spokesperson's Unit
- Mordechai Alkahi (1925–1947), Petah Tikva-born Turkish member of the Irgun
- Albert Antébi (1873–1919), Ottoman public activist and community leader born in Ottoman Syria, who worked for the old and new Jewish settlement in Palestine
- Solomon Ashkenazi (c. 1520–1602), Ottoman-Venetian physician and businessman active in Ottoman, Venetian and Polish–Lithuanian politics
- Ruhama Avraham (born 1964), Israeli politician who served as a member of the Knesset
- Esther Benbassa (born 1950), French historian and politician; member of the French Senate (2011–2023)
- Avraham Ben-Shoshan (born 1940), Israeli military officer; Commander of the Israeli Navy (1985-1989)
- Eliezer Cohen (born 1934), Israeli politician who served as a member of the Knesset
- Geulah Cohen (1925–2019), Israeli politician and activist
- Nechemya Cohen (1943–1967), Israeli soldier; the most decorated soldier in the history of the IDF
- Steve Cohen (born 1949), American attorney and politician; member of the U.S. House of Representatives
- Dalia Dorner (born 1934), Israeli-Turkish judge; justice of the Supreme Court of Israel (1993-2004)
- Shlomo Gazit (1926–2020), Israeli military officer and academic; major general in the Israel Defense Forces, head of the Military Intelligence Directorate
- Mordechai Gazit (1922–2016), Israeli diplomat; adviser to Israeli Prime Minister Golda Meir; ambassador to France; and Director-General of the Israeli Foreign Ministry
- Françoise Giroud (1916–2003), French journalist, screenwriter, writer, and politician; Minister of Culture
- Nessim Gaon (1922–2022), Swiss financier; vice president of the World Jewish Congress
- Yaakov Hagoel (born 1971), chairman of the World Zionist Organization
- Emanuel Karasu (1862–1934), Ottoman lawyer and politician; member of the Ottoman Chamber of Deputies, member of the Young Turks
- Ileana Ros-Lehtinen (born 1952), American politician, member of the U.S. House of Representatives
- Alejandro Mayorkas (born 1959), American attorney and government official, 7th United States Secretary of Homeland Security
- Yitzhak Navon (1921–2015), Israeli politician, diplomat, playwright, and author; 5th President of Israel; first Israeli president born in Jerusalem and the first Sephardi Jew to serve in that office
- Tamir Pardo (born 1953), Israeli intelligence officer; 11th Director of Mossad
- Emin Pasha (1840–1892), Ottoman physician, naturalist, and governor of the Egyptian province of Equatoria on the upper Nile
- Luisa Porritt (born 1987), British politician
- Issy Smith (1890–1940), British-Australian military officer and recipient of the Victoria Cross
- Moshe Bar Siman Tov (born 1976), Israeli economist and the Director-General of the Ministry of Health
- David Tzur (born 1959), Israeli politician and former policeman; member of the Knesset

=== Religion ===
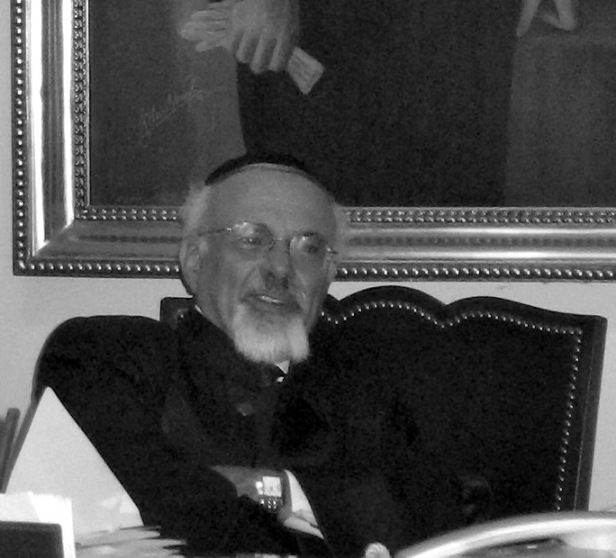
Ishak Haleva, Hakham Bashi (Chief Rabbi) of Turkey (2002-2025)

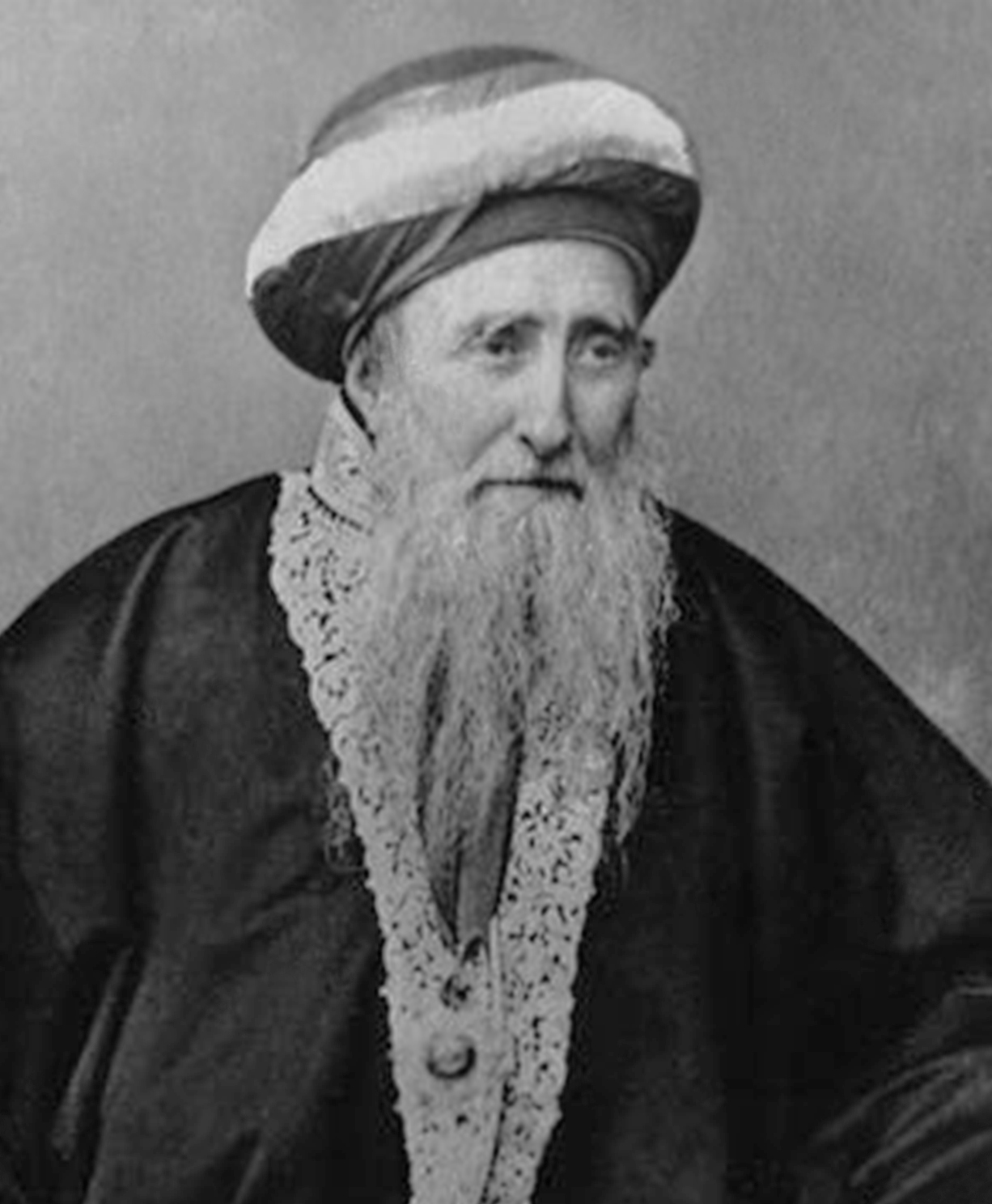
Abraham Palacci, Chief Rabbi and author of Smyrna; member of the Pallache family

- Aaron Alfandari (c. 1700–1774), Turkish Talmudic writer
- Marc D. Angel (born 1945), American rabbi and author
- Hayyim Isaac Algazi (d. c. 1819), Turkish Chief Rabbi of Smyrna
- Yom Tov Algazi (1727–1782), Ottoman Chief Rabbi of Jerusalem (1773-1782)
- Hayyim ben Jacob Alfandari (1558–1640), Turkish Talmudic educator and writer
- Solomon Eliezer Alfandari (c. 1826–1830), Ottoman rabbi, kabbalist and rosh yeshiva of Istanbul
- Albert Jean Amateau (1889–1996), Turkish rabbi, lawyer and social activist
- David Asseo (1914–2002), Turkish rabbi; Hakham Bashi (Chief Rabbi) of the Republic of Turkey (1961-2002)
- Asenath Barzani (1590 – 1670), Ottoman-Kurdish female rabbinical scholar and poet
- Joshua ben Israel Benveniste (c. 1590 – 1668), Ottoman rabbi at Constantinople and physician
- Elijah Capsali (c. 1485–1550), Ottoman rabbi and historian
- Moses Capsali (1420–1495), Ottoman rabbi; first Hakham Bashi (Chief Rabbi) of the Ottoman Empire
- Abraham Danon (1857–1925), Turkish rabbi, Hebraist, writer and poet
- Haim Moussa Douek (1905–1974), Turkish rabbi; last Chief Rabbi of Egypt
- Menahem Egozi (c. 1500s), Turkish Talmudist
- Ishak Haleva (1940–2025), Turkish rabbi; Hakham Bashi (Chief Rabbi) of Turkey (2002-2025)
- Aaron ben Solomon ben Hasun (c. 1500s), Turkish rabbi and Talmudic scholar
- Barzillai ben Baruch Jabez (c. 1700s), Turkish Talmudist
- Elijah Mizrachi (c. 1455–1525), Ottoman Talmudist and posek; authority on Halakha and mathematician
- Chaim Nahum (1872–1960), Turkish rabbi; Grand Rabbi of the Ottoman Empire; jurist, and linguist; member of the Turkish delegation for the Lausanne Treaty
- Abraham Palacci (c. 1809–1898), Turkish rabbi; Chief Rabbi and author of Smyrna; member of the Pallache family
- Haim Palachi (c. 1788–1868), Turkish rabbi; Chief Rabbi of Smyrna and Gaon
- Joseph Palacci (1815–1896), Turkish rabbi and author in Ladino and Hebrew in Smyrna
- Rahamim Nissim Palacci (1813–1907), Turkish rabbi; Chief Rabbi of Smyrna and author
- Mosè Piccio (d. c. 1576), Ottoman lexicographer; compiled Zikhron Torat Moshe (Hebrew: זכרון תורת משה)
- Benjamin Pontremoli (1740–1784), Turkish rabbi and poet, member of the Pontremoli dynasty
- Yitzhak Sarfati (d. c. 1400s), French-Ottoman rabbi; Chief Rabbi of Edirne
- Joseph Taitazak (d. c. 1529), Ottoman Talmudic authority and Kabbalist; member of the Taitazak family
- Sabbatai Zevi (1926–1676), Ottoman former Jewish mystic and rabbi from Smyrna; founder of the Sabbatean movement
- Aaron Zorogon (d. c. 1600s), Turkish Torah scholar

=== Sports ===
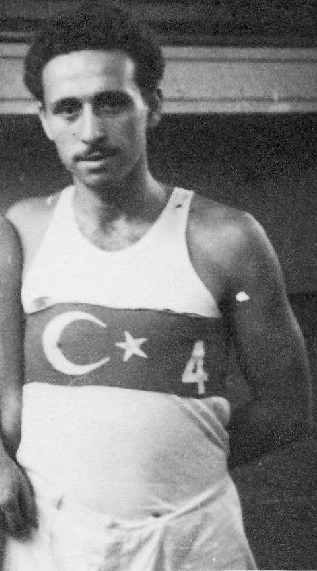
Avram Barokas, basketball player and coach

- Eli Abarbanel (born 1976), Israeli football player
- Barak Bakhar (born 1979), Israeli former player and the current manager of Maccabi Haifa
- Pini Balili (born 1979), Israeli former football manager and former football player
- Avram Barokas (1926–2003), Turkish basketball player and coach
- Arik Benado (born 1973), Israeli football manager and former player
- Joe Bonomo (1901–1978), American weightlifter, strongman and actor
- Rober Eryol (1930–2000), Turkish football player for Galatasaray and manager for Hapoel Be'er-Sheva
- Umut Güzelses (born 1987), Turkish-Israeli football player
- Alfred König (1913–1987), Turkish Olympic sprinter and 1935 Maccabiah Games competitor
- Jack Molinas (1931–1975), American professional basketball player; NBA All-Star (1954)
- Adi Soffer (born 1987), Israeli footballer
- Avi Soffer (born 1986), Israeli football player
- Garrett Wittels (born 1990), American baseball player
- Derya Yannier (born 1985), Turkish basketball player and coach, Fenerbahçe Beko General Manager

=== Literature and journalism ===
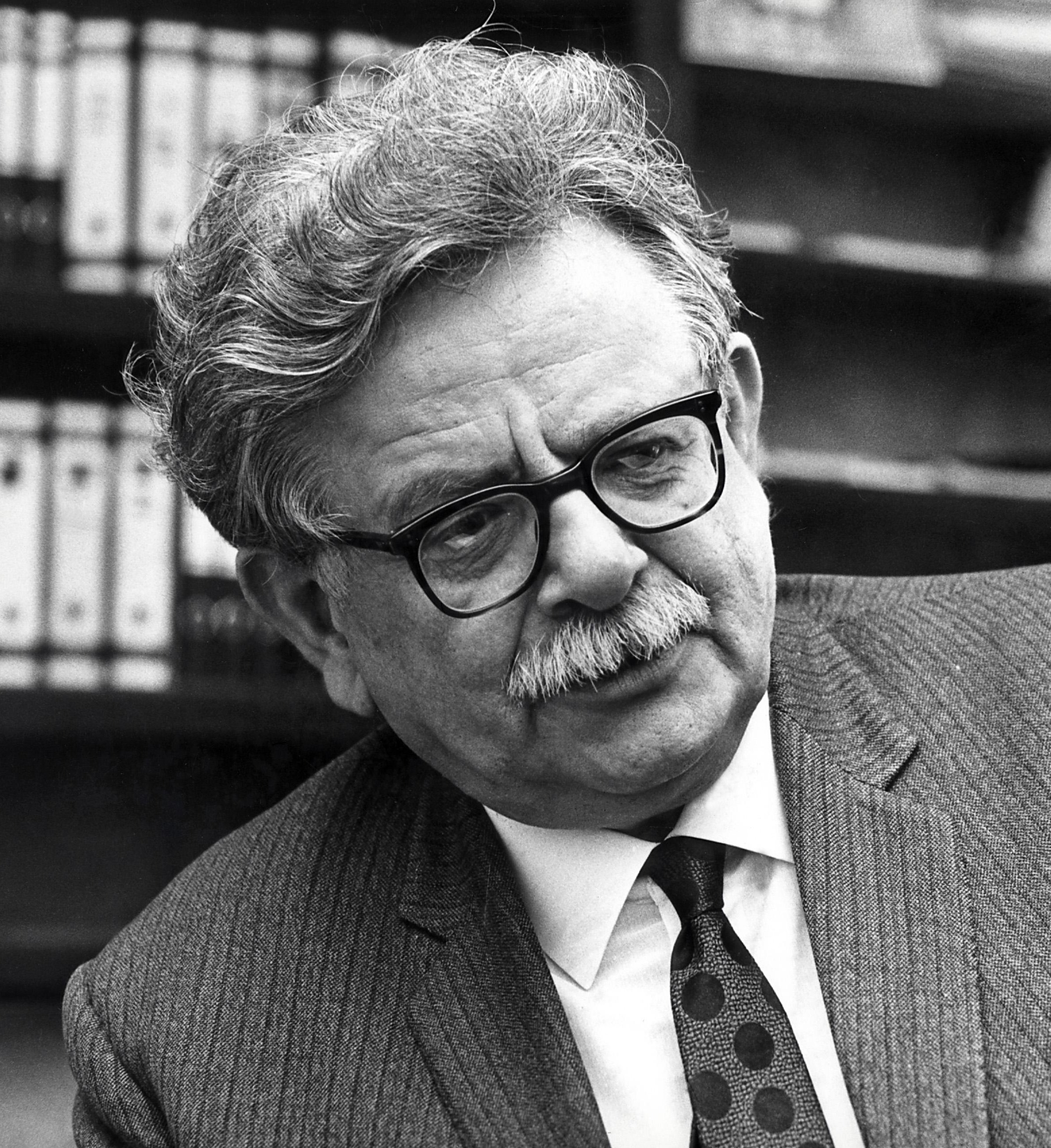
Elias Canetti, author, 1981 Nobel Prize in Literature winner

- Alexander Aciman (born 1990), American writer and journalist
- André Aciman (born 1951), American writer
- Stella Aciman (born 1953), Turkish novelist, columnist for Yeni Düzen
- Beki Luiza Bahar (1926–2011), Turkish writer and playwright
- Asa Benveniste (1925–1990), American poet, typographer and publisher
- Elias Canetti (1905–1994), German-language writer, novelist, memoirist; 1981 Nobel Prize in Literature winner
- Elia Carmona (1869–1931), Ottoman author and journalist; founder of El Jugueton (Hebrew: איל ג'וגיטון)
- Vitalis Danon (1897–1969), Ottoman-Tunisian writer and educator at Alliance Israélite Universelle
- Moris Farhi (1935–2019), Turkish author, vice president of International PEN (2001-2019)
- Erol Güney (1914–2009), Turkish-Israeli journalist, translator and author
- Albert Karasu (1885–1982), Turkish journalist
- Sami Kohen (1928–2021), Turkish journalist and columnist for Milliyet
- Mario Levi (1957–2024), Turkish novelist, journalist and scholar with a focus on modern Turkish literature
- Peter Levi (1931–2000), English poet, archaeologist, Jesuit priest, travel writer, biographer, academic and critic; Professor of Poetry at the University of Oxford (1984–1989)
- Saadia ben Abraham Longo (d. c. 1500s), Turkish Hebrew poet
- Roni Margulies (1955–2023), Turkish poet, author, translator and political activist
- Leandra Medine (born 1988), American author and blogger
- Édouard Roditi (1910–1992), American poet, short-story writer, critic and translator of Turkish
- Moshe Shaul (1929–2023), Israeli journalist, writer and researcher of the culture of Sephardi Jews
- Diana Souhami (born 1940), English writer
- Benny Ziffer (born 1953), Israeli author and journalist

=== Miscellaneous ===
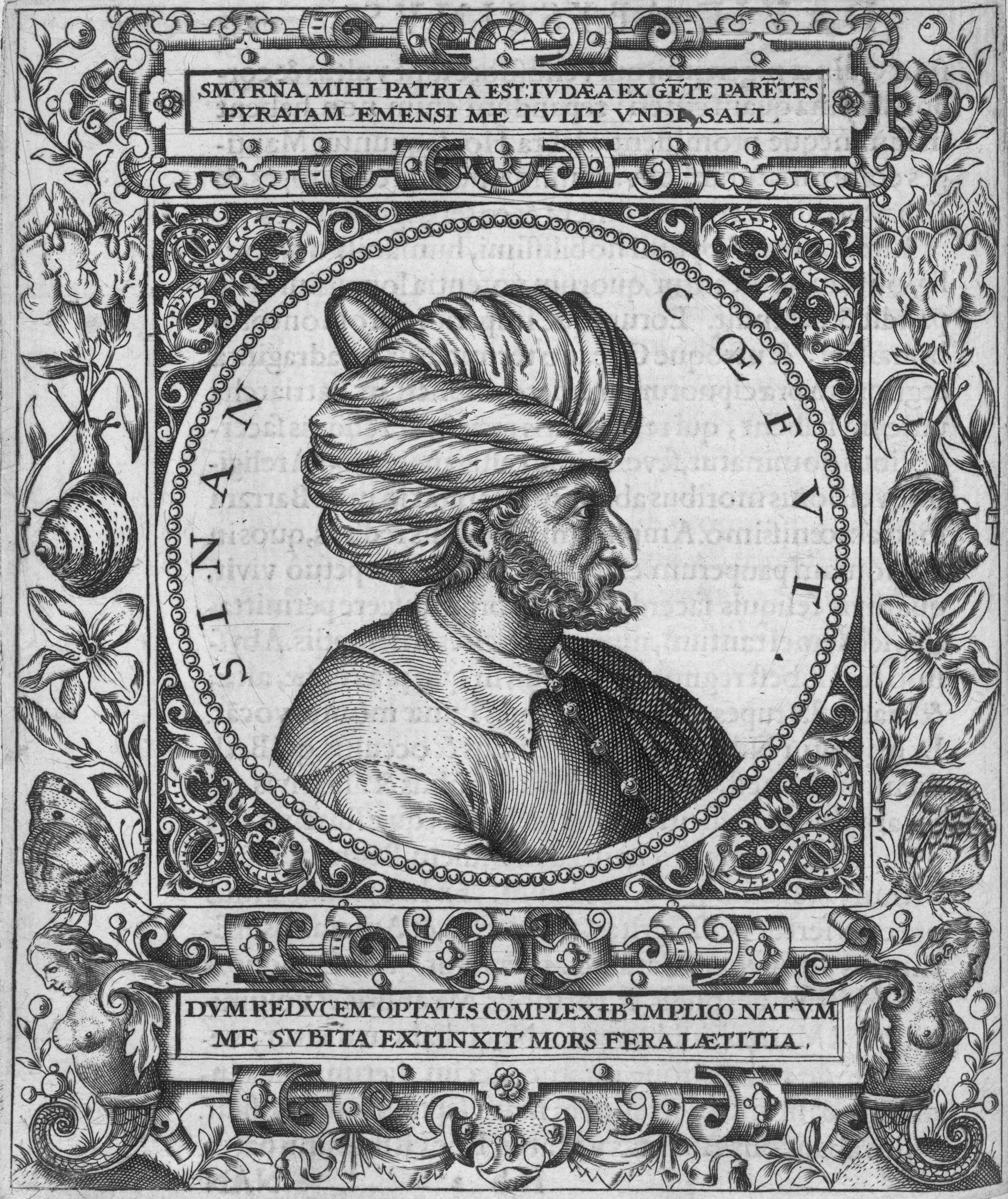
Sinan Reis, Ottoman corsair and second in command of Hayreddin Barbarossa

- Tobias Cohn (1652–1729), Polish-Ottoman physician to Ottoman Sultan Mehmed IV, Suleiman II, Ahmed II, Mustafa II and Ahmed III
- Jacque Fresco (1916–2007), American futurist
- Bohor Hallegua (d. c. 1926), Ottoman chess player
- Moses Hamon (1490–1554), Ottoman physician and patron Jewish learning
- Yolande Harmer (1913–1959), Israeli intelligence officer who operated in Egypt
- Hila Klein (born 1987), Israeli-American YouTuber
- Liran Kohener (born 1988), Israeli model; Miss Israel 2007
- Rodrigo Lehtinen (born 1986), American LGBTQ rights advocate
- Joseph Nasi (1524–1579), Ottoman diplomat and administrator; influential figure in the Ottoman Empire during the rules of both Sultan Suleiman I and Selim II
- Joseph Niego (1863–1945), Turkish-born Jewish activist
- Lenore Skenazy (born 1959), American speaker, blogger, syndicated columnist, author, and reality show host
- Rona Ramon (1964–2018), Israeli public activist and STEM influencer
- Sinan Reis (c. 1533–1546), Ottoman corsair; second in command of the Ottoman admiral Hayreddin Barbarossa
- Solomon ibn Verga (c. 1460–1554), historian, physician, and author of the Shevet Yehudah (Hebrew: שבט יהודה)

== See also ==
- Alliance of Rabbis in Islamic States
- Labor Zionism in the Ottoman Empire
- Maccabi S.K.
- Jewish Museum of Turkey
- Bukharan Jews
- Crimean Karaites
- Jewish diaspora
- Judaeo-Spanish or Ladino
- Karaim language
- Khazars
- Krymchak language
- Krymchaks (Crimea)
- History of the Jews in İzmir
- History of the Jews in Istanbul
- List of synagogues in Turkey
- Mountain Jews
- House of Camondo
- Cicurel family
- Pallache family
- Religious minorities in Turkey
- Şalom
- Subbotniks
- Turkish Jews in Israel
- Urfalim
- Yevanic language

== Bibliography ==
- Baer, Marc D. (2020). Sultanic Saviors and Tolerant Turks: Writing Ottoman Jewish History, Denying the Armenian Genocide. Indiana University Press. ISBN 978-0-253-04542-3.
- Kieser, Hans-Lukas (2018). Talaat Pasha: Father of Modern Turkey, Architect of Genocide. Princeton University Press. ISBN 978-0-691-15762-7.
- Toktaş, Şule (May 2006). "Turkey's Jews and their immigration to Israel". Middle Eastern Studies. 42 (3): 505–519. doi:10.1080/00263200500521479.
- "Turkish Writer Exposes Persecution of Jews in Turkey". Harut Sassounian. Asberaz. 19 April 2017.

== External sources ==
- Moreno, Aviad; Karkason, Tamir (July 2023). "A transnational millet in the Jewish state: A Judeo-Spanish diaspora between Israel and Turkey, 1948–1958". Nations and Nationalism. 29 (3): 1093–1111. doi:10.1111/nana.12959.
- Moreno, Aviad; Karkason, Tamir (7 July 2023). "Repositioning Ethnicity and Transnationalism: Community Resilience Strategies among the Non-Migratory Segment of Turkish Jewry". Societies. 13 (7): 161. doi:10.3390/soc13070161.
- Levine, Rabbi Menachem, The History of the Jews of Turkey, Aish.com
- "Hayalet Evler: Türk-Yahudi Mimarisinden Örnekler", Beyaz Arif Akbas, Ekim 2012, YGY, ISBN 978-1480206502
- In particular on the history of Istanbul Jewry after the fall of the Byzantine Empire, see M. Rosen, Studies in the History of Istanbul Jewry, 1453–1923 (Diaspora, 2), Turnhout, 2015
- An-Ottoman-Odyssey-A-Rabbi-Rediscovers-Turkeys-Jews-Past-and-Present 16 August 2021 Chabad.com
