= Avram Barokas =

Turkish basketball player (1926–2003)

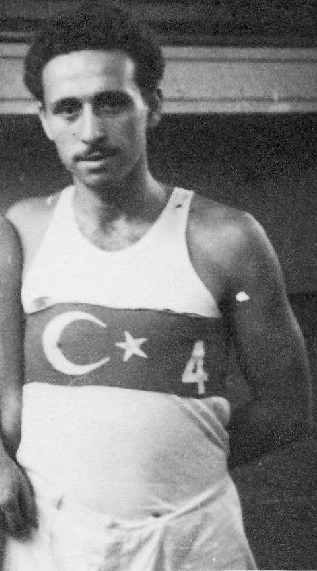

Personal information
- Born: 25 July 1936 Bakırköy, Istanbul, Turkey
- Died: 4 July 2003 (aged 66) Istanbul, Turkey
- Listed height: 189 cm (6 ft 2 in)

Career information
- High school: Ulus Musevi Lisesi
- Playing career: 1940–1956
- Position: Center
- Number: 4

Career history
- 1940–1943: Beşiktaş
- –: Beyoğlu S.K.
- –: Galatasaray
- 1954–1956: Beyoğlu S.K.

Avram Barokas (25 July 1926 – 4 July 2003), known as with his given nickname Börek, was a Turkish international basketball player, coach and horse racing enthusiast.

== Career ==
Barokas started to play basketball as a team player at men's basketball branch of Beşiktaş J.K., where he was promoted to senior squad at the age of 13. He won Istanbul Basketball League both under Galatasaray and Beyoğlu S.K. squads.

Barokas represented Turkey at international competitions, earning total of 24 caps. He competed at EuroBasket 1949 where Turkey finished the tournament at 4th place. He was also in Turkey's squad at EuroBasket 1951 in which Turkey earned 6th place.

Following his basketball career, he was involved in horse racing competitions in Turkey. He owned horses as well as being a member of the board of directors at the Jockey Club of Turkey.

== Personal life ==
Barokas was born in Bakırköy, Istanbul, to Turkish-Jewish parents Reyna and Samuel Barokas. He studied at Ulus Private Jewish High School (Turkish: Ulus Özel Musevi Lisesi). He married Suzet Meyohas in 1952 and the couple welcomed their daughter, Cina, in 1952. Barokas died on 4 July 2003. His funeral was held at Neve Shalom Synagogue and he was buried in Ulus Jewish Cemetery.

== Legacy ==
The Jockey Club of Turkey organizes an annual "Avram Barokas Derby".
