= Shaily Lipa =

Israeli cookbook author, editor, recipe developer, content creator and TV show host

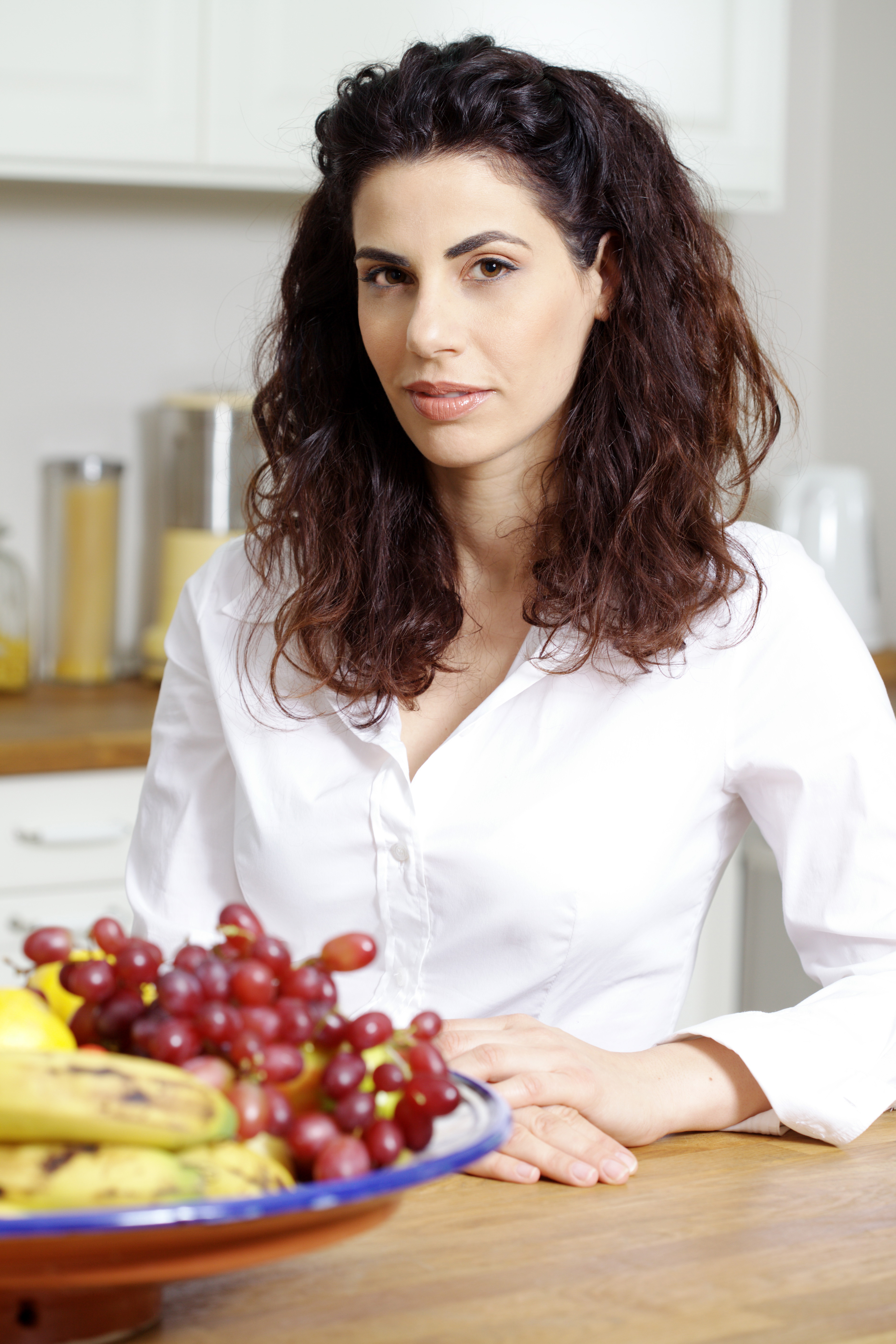
Shaily Lipa

Shaily Lipa (Hebrew: שי-לי ליפא; born May 22, 1974, in Tel Aviv) is an Israeli cookbook author, culinary editor, recipe developer, content creator and TV cookery show host.

== Background ==
Shaily Lipa was born in Tel Aviv and raised there and in Ra'anana, the daughter of Tel Aviv natives whose origins are in Greece and Turkey. Her Greek grandparent is a Holocaust survivor who survived Auschwitz. She was raised in a family that dines well, entertains and talks about food.

She never studied formally in any cookery school, but she attended several cooking courses. Her academic studies include a bachelor's degree in biology from the agriculture faculty of the Hebrew University of Jerusalem.

== Career ==
At the time her son Itamar was born, Lipa sought a career change compatible with raising him. She won first place in a recipe contest held by the "Gourmet" supplement of the Israeli women's magazine At (Hebrew: "you" [f.]). Her prizes were a trip to Paris and her own food column.

In summer 2005 she published an article about healthy food in the magazine Al Hashulchan (Hebrew: On the Table). In the years 2009 – 2011 she authored a food column in the Israeli mainstream daily Maariv. Since November 2011 she has hosted, along with other chefs, a food section on the lifestyle television show hosted by Odetta Schwartz. She participated in the third season of the Matkon Batuach (Hebrew: Safe Recipe) show on Israel TV's Channel 2, together with other prominent Israeli chefs.

In May 2012 she started hosting her own TV cookery show, Habait shel Shaily (Hebrew: Shaily's Home) on TV Channel 2's Reshet division. In each installment she prepares five easy-to-make dishes.

In September 2015 she started hosting her TV cookery show "Super Shaily" on TV channel 10. In each installment she cooks 4–5 courses meal and hosts a DIY (Do It Yourself) expert.

Lipa has developed recipes for food industry companies including Tnuva, Shimrit, Sunfrost, Maadanot, Hardoof, Gad Milk, and Quaker Oats.

In May 2017 she started hosting her new TV cookery show, Matkon le-Chisachon (Hebrew: Recipe for saving) on TV Channel 2's Keshet division. In each installment she prepares five easy and minimalistic dishes.

By the beginning of 2017, Shaily Lipa had written 11 cookbooks as well as a children's book about superfoods. She is also the culinary editor of two of Mickey Shemo's books, published by Al Hashulchan (English: On the Table): The Best of Mickey Shemo, 2009 (Hebrew: Mickey Shemo Ha’meytav); Sabbaths and Jewish Holidays with Mickey Shemo, 2011 (Hebrew: Shabatot vechagim im Mickey Shemo).

== Personal life ==
Shaily Lipa is married to the financial entrepreneur, Rafi Lipa. The couple has two children.

In August 2010, after her father was diagnosed with ALS, she joined the Prize4Life organization.

== Bibliography ==
=== Titles in Hebrew ===
- Pashut Le-Areach ("Entertaining Made Easy"), with Ariela Yariv-Gutenberg, 2005
- Hagim ("[Jewish] Holiday Entertaining"), 2007
- Ha-Mitbach ha-Bari shel Al ha-Shulchan ("The Healthy Kitchen"), with Orly Peli-Bronshtein and dietician Michal Langberg; 2007
- Mitbach Bari le-Yeladim ("Healthy Kitchen for Kids"), with Michal Langberg, 2010
- 120 ha-Klasikot shel Shaily ("Shaily's 120 Classics"), 2011
- Ha-Bayit shel Shaily ("At Home with Shaily"), 2012
- Ha-Mitbach ha-Balkani Sheli ("My Balkan Kitchen"), 2014
- Elisheba ve-sayeret ha-Superfood ("Elisheba and her Superfoods A-team), 2016
- Shaily mevashelet – Chagei Tishrei ("Shaily cooks – Tishrei Holidays"), 2016
- Shaily mevashelet – Chag ha-'Aviv ("Shaily cooks – Passover Holiday"), 2017
- 100% Tivey ("100% Natural"), 2017

=== Titles in English ===
- "Deliciously Healthy" – Vegetables, Leisure Arts, Inc, 2012
