= Yitzhak Sarfati =

French–Jewish Ottoman rabbi

Yitzhak Sarfati also spelt Tsarfati (Hebrew: יצחק צרפתי) was a German-born, Ashkenazi rabbi who settled in the Ottoman Empire prior to the fall of Constantinople, and served as the Chief Rabbi of Edirne.

== Biography ==
Born in Germany sometime in the early 15th century, Sarfati was originally of French descent (his surname "Sarfati" צרפתי means "French" in Hebrew). Not much is known of his early life but in c. 1453, Sarfati moved to the Ottoman Empire where he was eventually made the Chief Rabbi of Edirne. That following year, he sent out a letter to the Jews of the Rhineland, Swabia, Styria, Moravia, and Hungary in which he spoke with great enthusiasm of the fortunate conditions of the Jews under Ottoman control, stating; "I proclaim to you that Turkey is a land wherein nothing is lacking, and where, if you will, all shall yet be well with you. The way to the Holy Land lies open to you through Turkey." The following years witnessed a massive emigration of Jews to the Turkish lands, considered the third main wave of Jewish immigrants to Turkey.

== See also ==
- History of the Jews in Turkey
- History of the Jews in the Ottoman Empire
