= Labor Zionism in the Ottoman Empire =

Labor Zionism emerged in the late Ottoman period as a strand of Jewish political thought that combined the goal of a Jewish national homeland with socialist ideals such as collective labor, egalitarianism, and workers' organization. Within the Ottoman Empire, this movement developed in a complex political environment shaped by reform, revolution, and competing nationalisms sprouted in 1906 but emerged particularly after the Young Turk coup brought the Committee of Union and Progress to prominence.

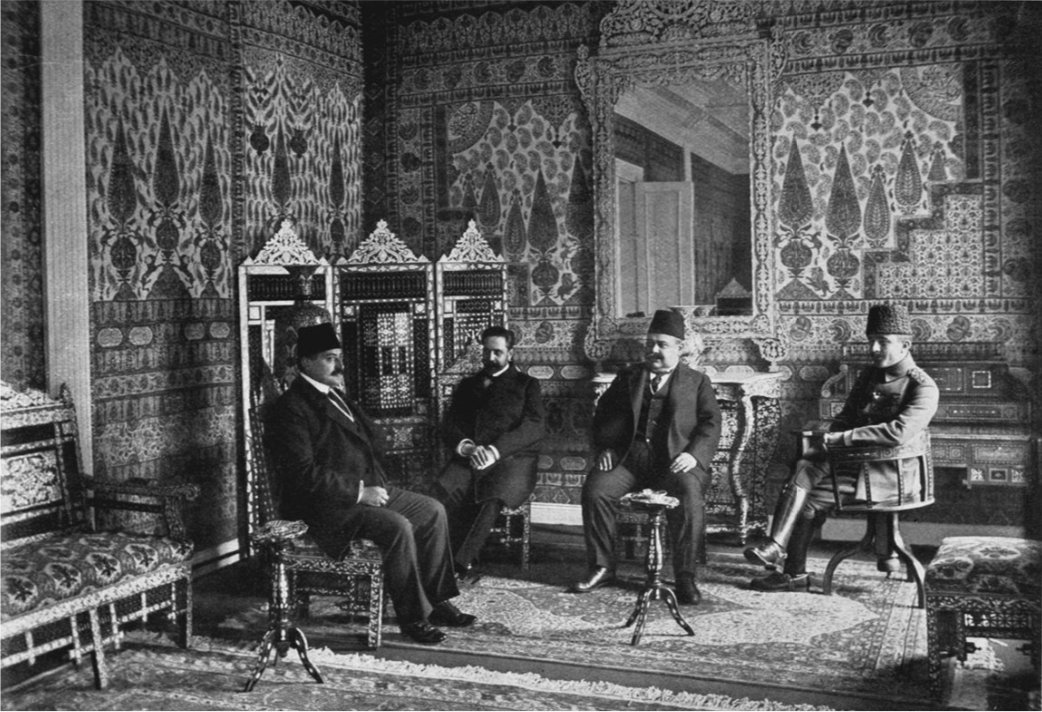
Naum Tyufekchiev with Talat Pasha, Enver Pasha, and Halil Pasha, 1915

Alfred Nossig, an early Zionist intellectual, was less directly embedded in Ottoman political life than others but contributed to the broader ideological framework of Zionist planning, including economic and demographic visions for Jewish settlement. His work reflected an attempt to reconcile European labor movement with national revival, though his relationship with Ottoman authorities remained mostly indirect.

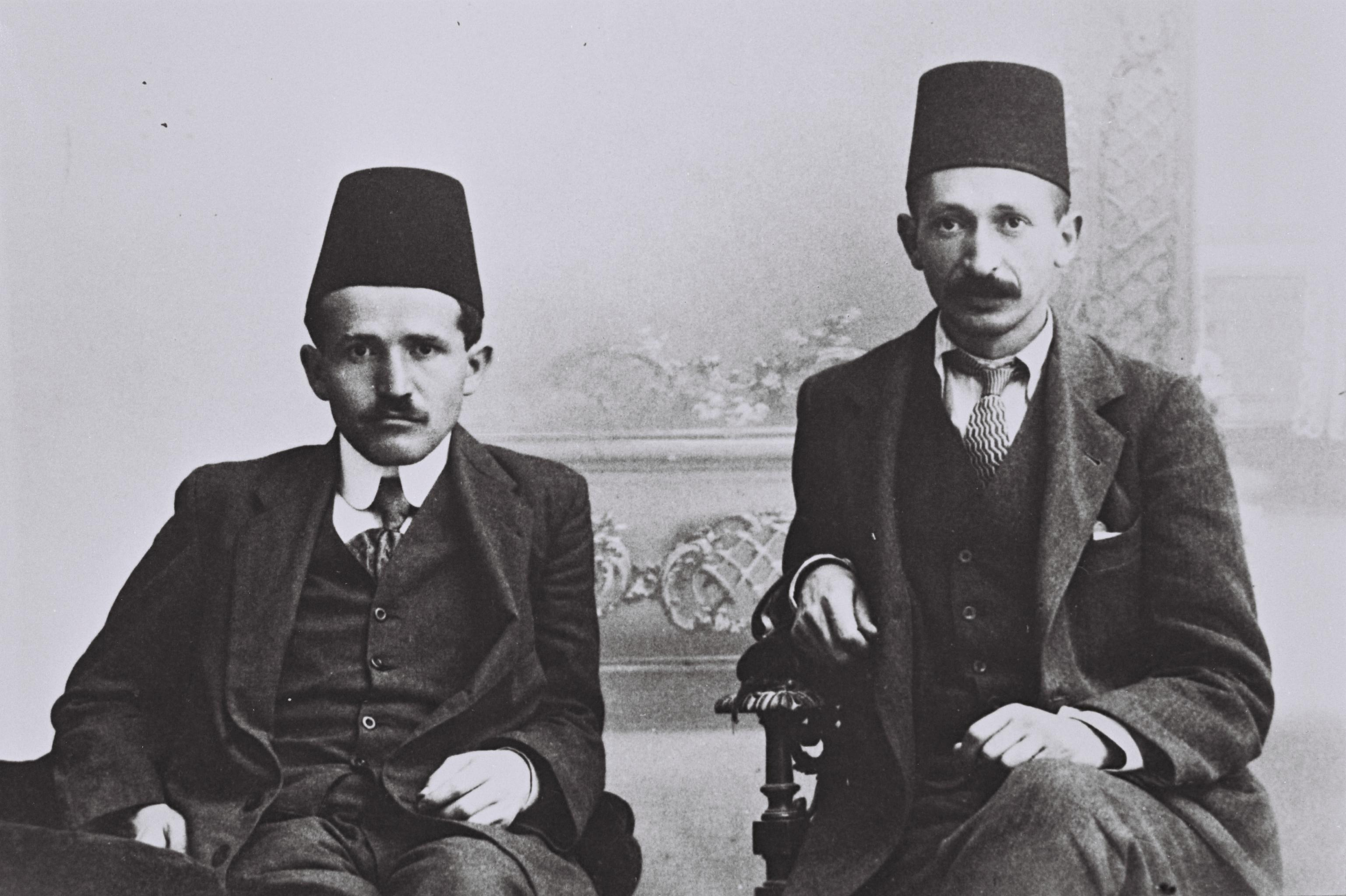
David Ben-Gurion and Yitzhak Ben Zvi as law students in Turkey, 1912

In contrast, David Ben-Gurion and Yitzhak Ben-Zvi were deeply involved in the Ottoman context. Both lived in Mutasarrifate of Jerusalem and initially pursued a strategy of Ottomanism—the idea that Jews could achieve national-cultural autonomy within a reformed Ottoman state. After 1908, they engaged with the İttihadists, even studying in Istanbul and expressing loyalty to the empire. Their labor Zionism emphasized Hebrew labor and agricultural collectivism, but politically they were pragmatic: they hoped cooperation with the Committee of Union and Progress would allow Jewish immigration and settlement to expand legally.

However, this relationship was marked by tension. The İttihadists, though initially promoting constitutional equality, grew increasingly suspicious of separatist national movements, including Zionism. While they tolerated some Jewish immigration and organization, they resisted any notion of political autonomy in Palestine. Ben-Gurion and Ben-Zvi’s Ottomanist phase thus gradually gave way to disillusionment, especially during World War I, when the Ottoman government tightened control and expelled some Zionist activists.

Alexander Parvus represents a different kind of connection. A Marxist revolutionary and political operator, Parvus had close ties to the İttihadist leadership and played a role in Ottoman economic and political circles during the pre-war and wartime periods. Although not a central figure in labor Zionism itself, his interactions with both Ottoman elites and European socialist networks illustrate the overlapping intellectual and political milieus of the time. Parvus supported revolutionary movements broadly and saw the Ottoman Empire as a strategic arena, but his relationship to Zionism was indirect and often instrumental rather than ideological.

Overall, the relationship between labor Zionists and the İttihadists was characterized by cautious cooperation, mutual utility, and underlying mistrust. Labor Zionists sought legitimacy and space for settlement within the Ottoman framework, while the İttihadists aimed to preserve imperial unity and sovereignty. The alliance never fully solidified, and by the end of the Ottoman period—especially amid the upheavals of World War I—it had largely unraveled, paving the way for new political alignments under British rule.

In retrospect, this brief period of interaction highlights a transitional moment: labor Zionists had not yet fully abandoned the idea of coexistence within a multiethnic empire, while the İttihadists had not yet entirely foreclosed the possibility of accommodating diverse national aspirations. The eventual breakdown of this relationship reflected the broader collapse of imperial pluralism in the early twentieth century.

== See also ==
- Otto Liman von Sanders
- Shlomo Yellin
