= Aaron Zorogon =

Turco-Jewish scholar

Aaron Zorogon was a Turco-Jewish scholar, who flourished about the middle of the seventeenth century. He was the author of "Bet Aharon" (House of Aaron), which contains sixty homilies, arranged in the order of the sections of the Pentateuch, as well as some comments on the "'En Ya'aḳob," the haggadic collection of Jacob Ḥabib. The book was published after his death by his son Elihu in Constantinople, 1678–79.
