= Alberto Hemsi =

Composer (1898–1975)

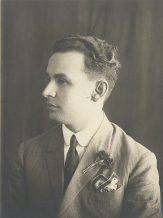
- Portrait
- Born: 27 June 1898; Turgutlu, Ottoman Empire
- Died: 8 October 1975 (aged 77); Paris

Alberto Hemsi (27 June 1898 – 8 October 1975) was a composer of the 20th century classical era. His work in the field of ethnomusicology and integration of Sephardic melodies has been noted as parallel to Béla Bartók's collection of traditional Hungarian music and consequent integration to his music.

== Life ==
=== Family and early years ===
Hemsi was born in 1898 in Turgutlu in the Ottoman Empire to a family of Sephardic Jews. From an early age, Alberto's parents detected a keen sensitivity and interest in music, especially during prayers sung in synagogue, and decided to send him to stay with his uncle in Smyrne (now Izmir). Hemsi studied at the school of the Alliance Israélite Universelle (A.I.U.) from 1908 to 1913. At the A.I.U., he studied flute, trombone, cornet, and the clarinet, but his true passions were for the piano and for composition.

=== 1913-1919: Conservatorio di Musica Giuseppe Verdi ===
In 1913, at the insistence of the director of the A.I.U., Hemsi moved to Italy after receiving a scholarship to study at the Conservatorio Royal di Milano. At the conservatorio, Hemsi was taught by internationally acclaimed professors such as Bossi Pirinello (composition, harmony, and counterpoint), Galli (orchestration), Pozzoli Delochi (theory and solfeggio), and Giusto Zampieri (music history). During his studies, Alberto Hemsi asked his music history professor about Jewish music. The response given was that although Jewish music is important, he could not recall any melodies because few existed. Perplexed and sceptical of this response, largely due to his exposure to many Jewish melodies in childhood, Hemsi proceeded to ask the cantor of his synagogue back in Turgutlu for more information about traditional Jewish melodies.

While studying in Milan, Hemsi was conscripted into the Italian Army following Italy's entrance into World War One and was wounded during the Tenth Battle of the Isonzo. He suffered significant and permanent damage to the muscle in his right arm, which prevented him from pursuing his goal of a career as a pianist. He became captain at the end of the war.

=== 1919-1957: Ethnomusicology and integration of Jewish melodies ===
After returning from Italy to his homeland, Alberto Hemsi taught theory, piano and choral singing in Smyrna. In 1924, he accepted a position as an interpreter at the Italian consulate on the island of Rhodes. There, he met his wife, Myriam, and in 1927, the pair joined his extended family in Egypt, where he worked as the musical director and conductor of the choir at the Eliyahu Hanavi Synagogue in Alexandria.

During this period, Hemsi began to follow in the folkloric footsteps of Bartók and Constantin Brăiloiu. He sought to collect the Hispano-Judeaic traditional music of his ancestors, which had been transmitted orally for generations by the women of the communities and infused with medieval Spanish literature. Hemsi proceeded to dedicate more than 17 years of his life to collecting traditional chants throughout the former Ottoman Empire, particularly in Smyrne, Salonica or Thessaloniki, Rhodes, Istanbul, and Alexandria.

At the end of these travels, Hemsi wrote out harmonizations for piano of sixty traditional melodies. This work was the first of the ten books known as "Coplas Sefardies."

Harmonization of the traditional Sephardic chants proved to be a challenge since the harmonization of monodic modal chants is not possible in a tonal sense. Hemsi did not wish to alter the traditional melodies nor utilise modern harmonic techniques of the epoch.

In addition to the Coplas Sefardies, Hemsi composed numerous other works for a variety of ensembles including orchestra, string quintets, choir, cello, and piano. He drew inspiration equally from liturgical music of the synagogue as well as music from Egypt, Turkey, and Greece.

=== 1957-1976: Paris ===
On August 22, 1957, the Hemsi family were displaced from Alexandria as part of the 1956–1957 exodus and expulsions from Egypt in the wake of the Suez Crisis. Compositional output at this time began to slow as Hemsi adjusted to the Parisian lifestyle. He found work as music director in synagogues as well as a solfeggio teacher for Sephardic liturgy at the École Cantoriale du Séminaire Israélite de France (S.I.F.) Hemsi continued to travel regularly to spread his musical compositions until later in his life, when his health began to degrade. He died of lung cancer in Paris in October 1975.

== Works, editions and recordings ==
- Coplas Sefardies – collection of sephardic songs composed by Hemsi from among 230 poems and songs collected in the former Ottoman Empire between 1923 and 1937. Pedro Aledo (voice), Ludovic Amadeus Selmi (piano). Patrimoines Musicaux des Juifs de France Vol. 4
- Coplas Sefardies, CD. Mira Zakai, alto, Menachem Wiesenberg, piano. Beth Hatefutsoth, Museum of the Jewish Diaspora, 1990, BTR 9002
- Coplas Sefardies (complete art-song recording), Vol. 1: cycle 1–4 (No. 1–24); Vol. 2: cycle 5-7 (No. 1-18), Kal Nidrey Op. 12, Four Songs Op. 42, Visions Bibliques Op. 48.1-3. Cantor Assaf Levitin, bass-baritone and Naaman Wagner, piano. Rondeau Production, 2018, ROP6155 and ROP6156
- Coplas Sefardies (complete recording of the original version), Vol. 1: No. 1-18, Vol. 2: No. 19-42, Vol 3: No. 43-60, Five Hebrew Songs Op. 25, Yom gila yavo, yavo! Op. 17. Tehila Nini Goldstein (soprano), Jascha Nemtsov (piano). Hänssler Classic, 2020, HC20039
