= Yomtov Garti =

Turkish mathematician and teacher

Yomtov Bonjour Garti (2 September 1915 – 21 February 2011) was a Turkish mathematician and a teacher of mathematics, physics and cosmography in Istanbul, Turkey.

== Life ==
Yomtov Garti was born in Kadıköy, at the Asian part of Istanbul (Ottoman Empire, later to become Turkey). His father Maer Garti was a veterinarian doctor, who died in the typhus epidemics during the World War I, while serving in the Ottoman Army. Yomtov Garti was educated at the French high school Lycée Saint-Joseph, Istanbul . After graduating from the Department of Mathematics and Physics of Istanbul University, he was approached by the famous mathematician Richard Edler von Mises, who was then located in Istanbul and proposed him a PhD position. Garti's PhD was on statistics and probability theory tutored by Richard Edler von Mises and William Prager.

Yomtov Garti received his PhD in 1939, as the first PhD student of von Mises and third PhD of Turkey. He later published his findings in an article (Garti, 1940), which is a generalization of initial distributions to n dimensions published in (cited in). Garti served as an assistant for a summer to Harry Dember, a professor in the Institute of Applied Physics in Istanbul. After receiving his doctoral degree in 1939, he started to teach at famous high schools in Istanbul. In 1954, he presented an article to Richard von Mises in a book published in his honor. Yomtov Garti continued teaching until age 92. He died, at the age of 96 in 2011. All main newspapers of Turkey announced the loss of “The teacher of teachers”. At his funeral, the several generations of students overfilled the Hemdat Israel Synagogue at Kadıköy, Istanbul.

== Career ==
Yomtov Garti became a renowned mathematics teacher in Istanbul. He thought mathematics and physics to thousands of students over six decades, in several famous schools, namely Galatasary High School (Galatasaray Lisesi), Haydarpaşa High School, Lycee Saint-Joseph Istanbul, and Notre Dame de Sion Lisesi. He also thought in Musevi Lisesi and Boğaziçi Üniversity. Yomtov Garti was rewarded the title of “Chevalier” of “Ordre des Palmes Academiques” by the French Government in recognition of his educational work in French schools in Turkey.

== Publications ==
- Garti, Y., 1940. Les lois de probabilité pour les fonctions statistiques (cas de collectifs à plusieurs dimensions). Revue Mathématique de l’Union Interbalkanique 3, 21–39.
- Garti Y, Consoli T. 1954. Sur la densite de probabilite du produit de variables aleatoires de Pearson du type III. In: Studies in mathematics and mechanics presented to Richard von Mises. Academic Press, New York. pp 301–309.
