= Aaron ben Solomon ben Hasun =

16th-century Jewish Talmudic scholar in the Ottoman Empire

Aaron ben Solomon ben Hasun was a Talmudist rabbi who flourished in Ottoman Turkey at the beginning of the sixteenth century. He ranked high among the prominent Oriental Talmudic scholars of his time. Except for some responsa, which may be found in the works of his pupils and colleagues, he left nothing in writing. Among his pupils were many important Talmudists of the East.
