= Sami Levi =

Sami Levi (born April 13, 1981, in Istanbul) is the soloist of the Turkish band Sefarad. He graduated in 1998 from the Göztepe Lisesi school in Istanbul.

== Solo career ==
Recently, he started his solo career, while still collaborating with Ceki Benşuşe of Sefarad. Of his solo career, he has released three albums: a maxi-single, Hade Hade - Duke Duke and a full album, Disco Kolbastı ve Balkan Havaları and SAMİ - Seve Seve 2011.

His website is: www.ttnetmuzik.com.tr/samiseveseve

== Discography ==
- Sefarad (2003) (with Sefarad)
- Sefarad II (2005) (with Sefarad)
- Evvel Zaman (2007) (with Sefarad)
- Hade Hade Duke Duke (2008)
- Disco Kolbastı ve Balkan Havaları (2009)
- Seve Seve (2011)

== See also ==
- Turkish pop music
- Music of Turkey
- List of Turkish pop music performers
