= History of the Jews in İzmir =

İzmir Jews
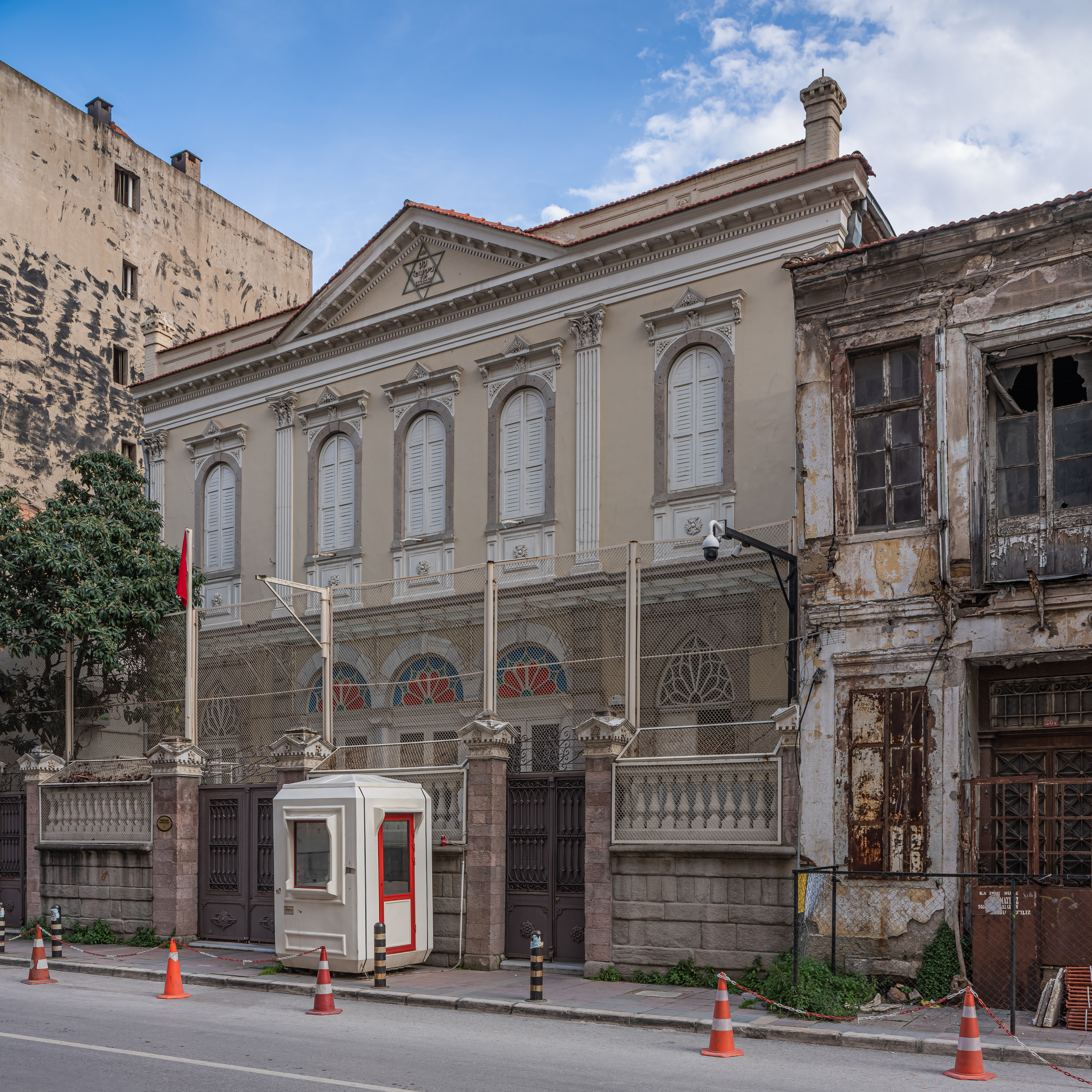
- Bet Israel Synagogue, the largest in İzmir

Total population
- 1,300; 2,500 (2007)

Languages
- Ladino, Turkish

The Jewish community of İzmir (historically known as Smyrna) is situated on the Aegean Sea of Turkey, and it was one of the largest Jewish communities within the Ottoman Empire, with a population of around 30,000 at its peak. Today, the community has around 1,300 people.

The community began to flourish during the 17th century, emerging as an important religious and cultural hub for Sephardic Jews. It also became a center for commercial and industrial activities. Sabbatai Zevi, a self-proclaimed messiah who attracted numerous followers, was from İzmir and significantly influenced the local Jewish population.

By the mid-19th century, the Jewish community in İzmir started to decline because of growing tensions with the Greek population, the collapse of the Ottoman Empire, and conflicts between Greece and Turkey. After the State of Israel was founded in 1948, about 10,000 Jews from Izmir left, which caused many Jewish community institutions to close down during the 1950s and 1960s.

== History ==
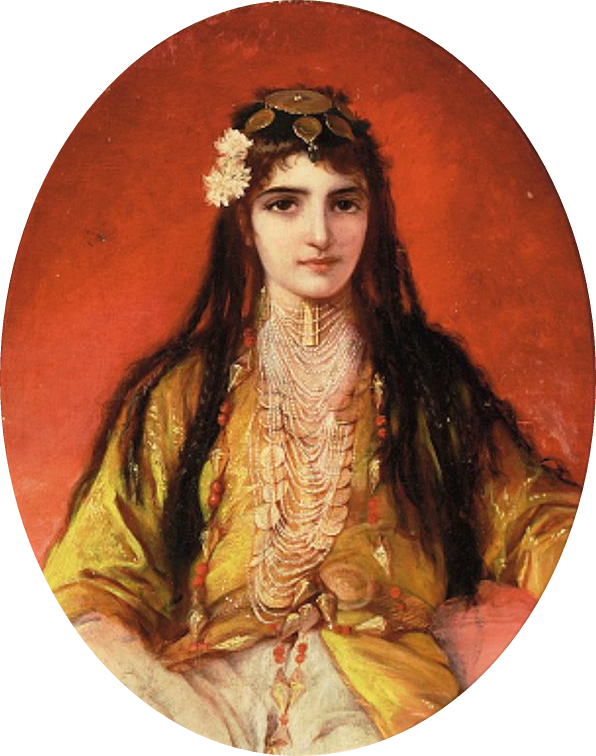
Zarina, a Jewish woman from Smyrna by Elisabeth Baumann (c. 1881)

The presence of Jews in İzmir (Smyrna) dates back to antiquity, with mentions in the New Testament (Revelation 2:8, 1:11). It appears that the Jewish community held some influence over the local pagan population, leading to a number of conversions. However, the rise of Christianity weakened the influence and presence of Jews in the region.

In 1424, Smyrna, then a relatively small and marginal town, was captured by the Ottoman Empire from the Byzantine Empire. Tombstones dating to 1540 and 1565, bearing Jewish symbols were found from that era. The first significant influx of Jews came in the 1630s.

In the late 16th century, a Sephardic community began to emerge, composed of Jews from Spain, Portugal, Asia, North Africa, and Venice. However, Ottoman records from this period provide limited evidence of an organized Jewish community in İzmir.

In the 16th century, Signora Giveret Synagogue was established, and it stands to this day.

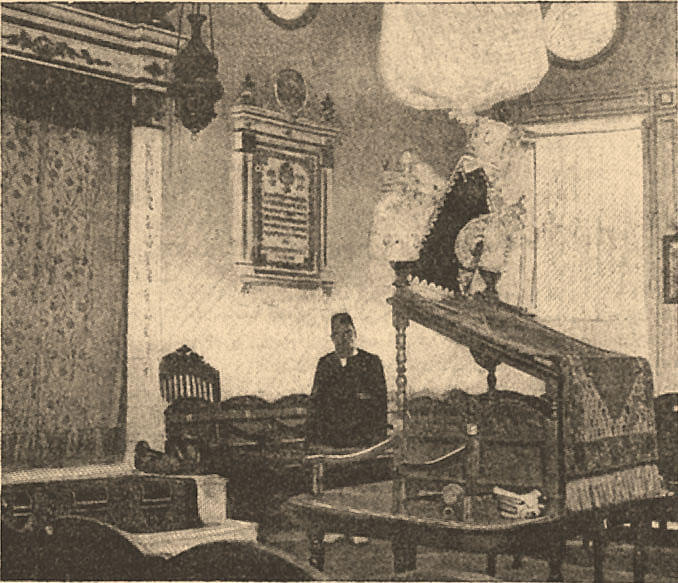
Interior of a synagogue in İzmir at the beginning of the 20th century

In the early 17th century, Jewish communities in İzmir, such as "Etz Haim", "Portugal", and "Girosh", were established, consisting mostly of descendants of earlier Jewish settlers from the area. Jews in Izmir enjoyed some freedom of religion, operated independent educational and legal systems, and financed their community through taxes. A distinct group called the Francos, European Jewish merchants, also lived in İzmir and enjoyed legal privileges.

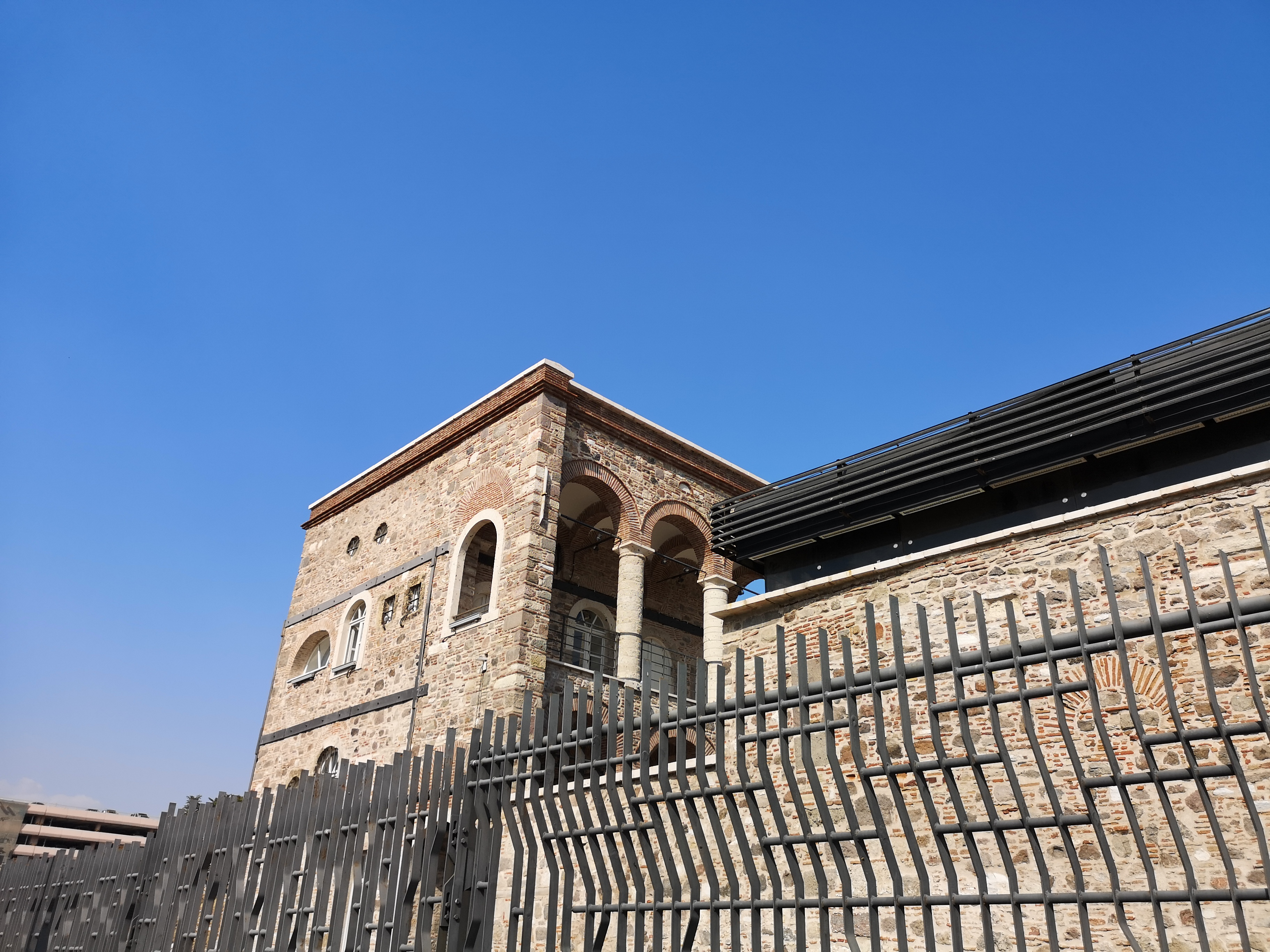
Building in the Agora of Smyrna where Sabbatai Zevi supposedly lived

A significant event in the 17th century was the rise of Sabbatai Zevi, a self-proclaimed messiah born in İzmir, whose messianic claims caused major upheaval, drawing support from many Jews, including Chief Rabbi Haim Benvanishti, while leading others to flee due to persecution. Despite the disputes and controversies, İzmir's Jewish community flourished, even establishing a Hebrew printing press in 1657.

In 1818, traveller William Jowett described the distribution of Smyrna (now İzmir) population, mentioning there were 10,000 jews living in İzmir at the time.

=== Today ===
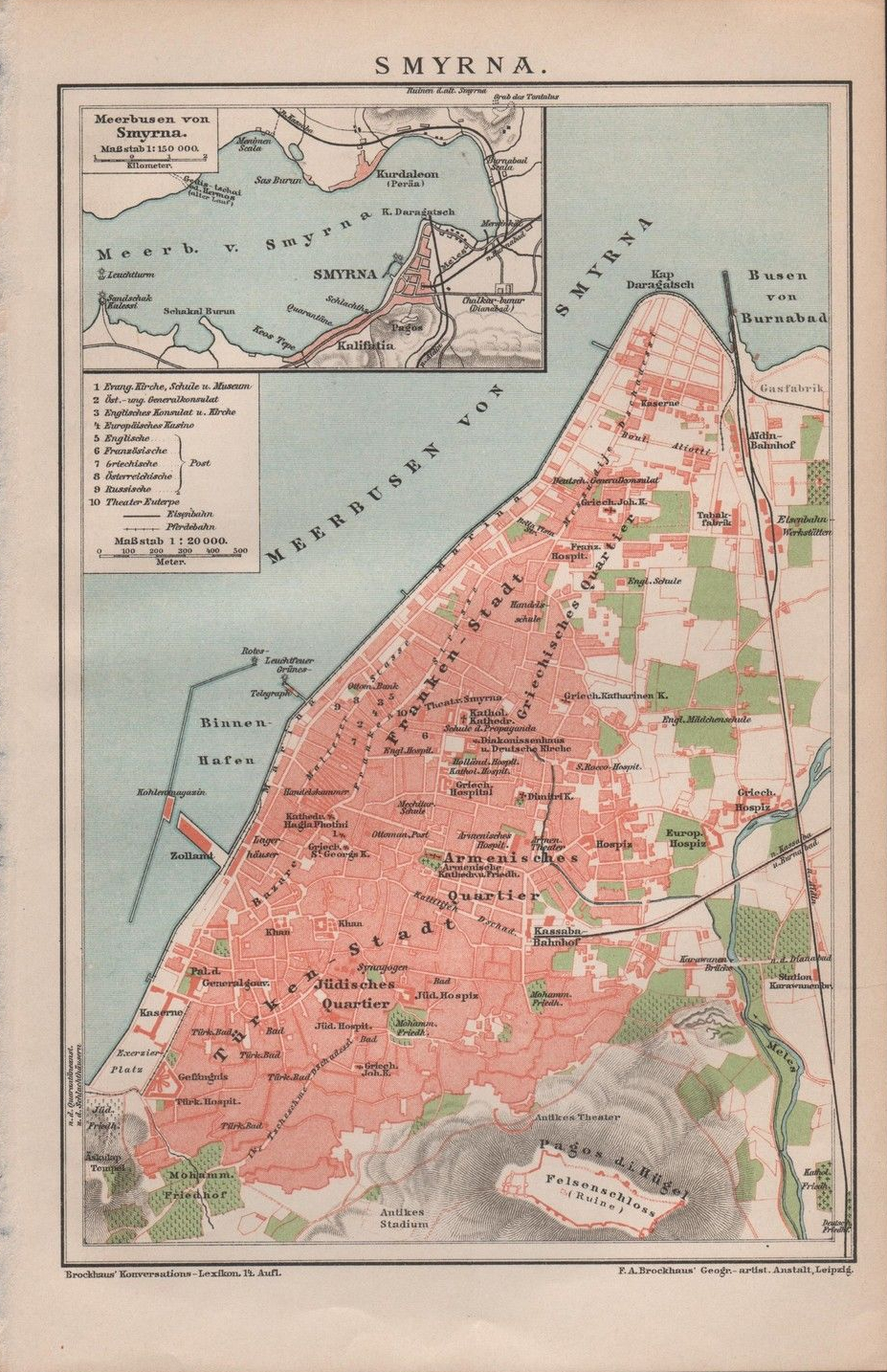
German map of Ottoman Smyrna in 1895, showing the different quarters of the city. The Jewish one is Jüdisches Quartier

The Jewish community experienced a significant decline in the early 1950s, leading to the closure of several institutions, including the local Jewish school, which shut down in 1959. By the 1960s, one school, two synagogues, a hospital, and a rabbinic court led by Chief Rabbi Moreno Seigora were still active, though the court ceased operations after Seigora's death in 1966. In 1970, a new synagogue was built in the Alsancak neighborhood.

Cultural activities are supported by "Liga" a donation-based organization that was established in 1990. The old Talmud Torah school closed in 1998, with students moving to the local American school. Today, around 150 children attend a Jewish elementary school in İzmir, where classes are conducted in Turkish, and Hebrew is taught for 15 hours a week. The Jewish hospital in Karatash also provides care to non-Jewish patients.

Following the establishment of the State of Israel, about 10,000 Jews immigrated from Izmir to Israel.

== Synagogues in İzmir ==
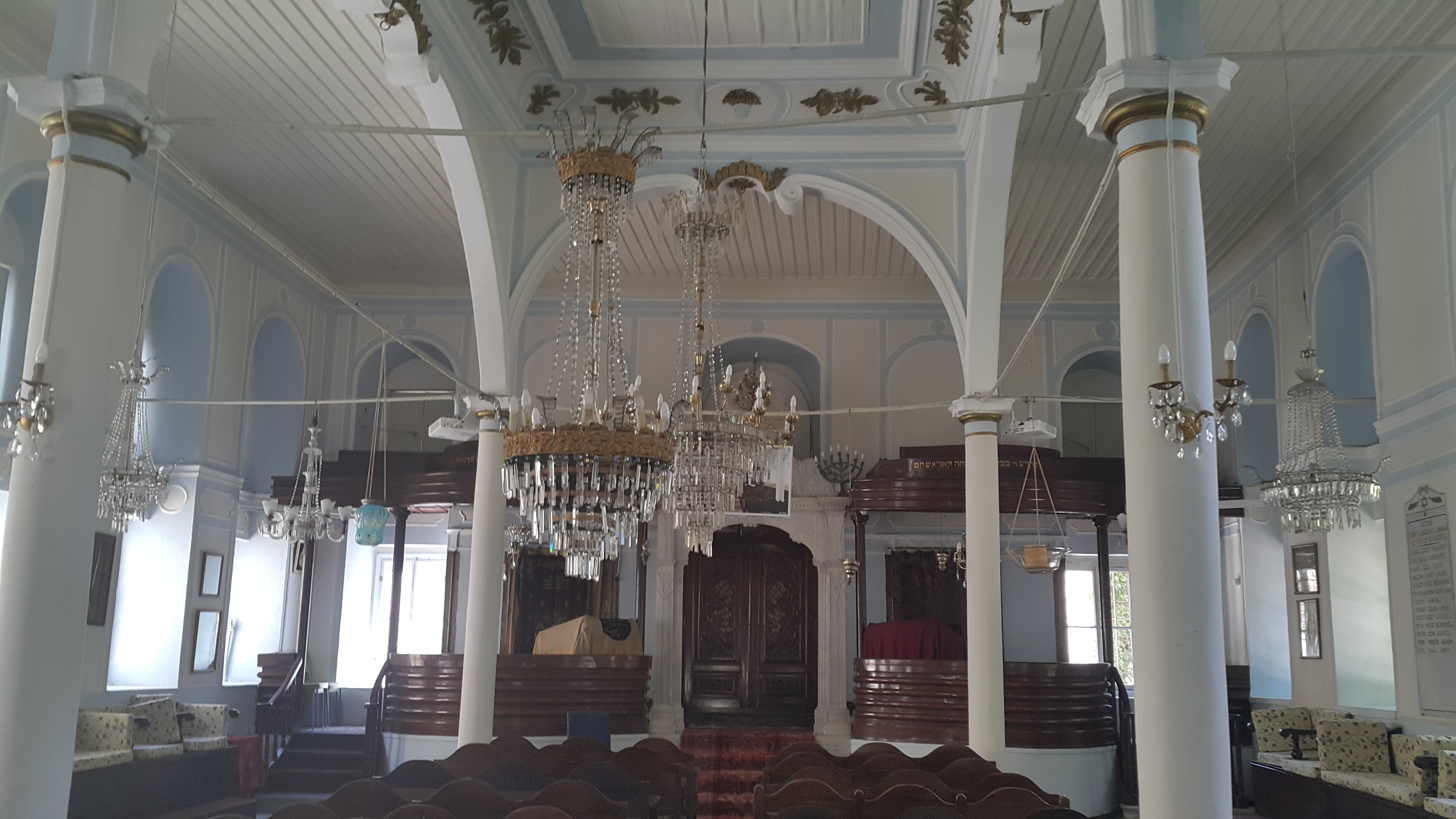
Interior of the Signora Giveret Synagogue

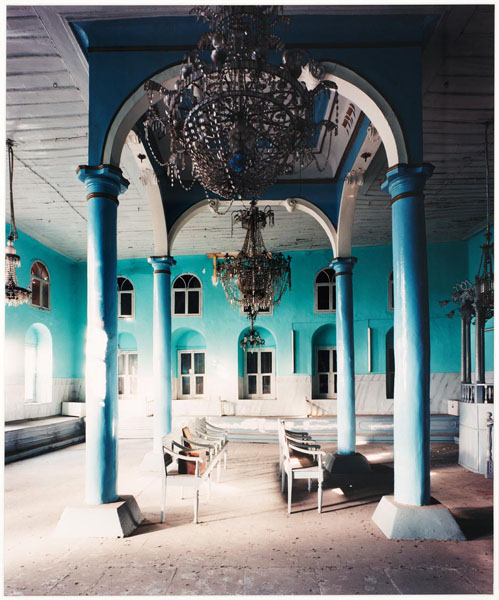
Interior of the Etz-Hayyim Synagogue

- Algazi Synagogue
- Ashkenazi Synagogue
- Aydınlı Shalom Synagogue
- Bet Israel Synagogue (İzmir)
- Beit-Hillel Synagogue
- Bikurkholim Synagogue
- Etz-Hayyim Synagogue
- Los Foresteros Synagogue
- Hevra Synagogue
- Kahal Kadosh Synagogue
- Portugal Synagogue
- Rosh-Ha-Ar Synagogue
- Shaar Hashamayim Synagogue (İzmir)
- Signora Giveret Synagogue

== See also ==
- Karataş, historically the part of İzmir where the city's Jewish wealthy population was concentrated
- Kemeraltı, historically a Jewish neighborhood with a cluster of Synagogues
- Boyoz, a pastry of Sephardic Jewish origin, associated with İzmir
- La Buena Esperanza, a Ladino language weekly newspaper which was published in İzmir
- History of the Jews in Istanbul
- History of the Jews in Thessaloniki
- History of the Jews in the Ottoman Empire
- History of the Jews in Turkey
