= Kemeraltı =

Historical market district of İzmir, Turkey

Coordinates: 38°25′06″N 27°07′56″E

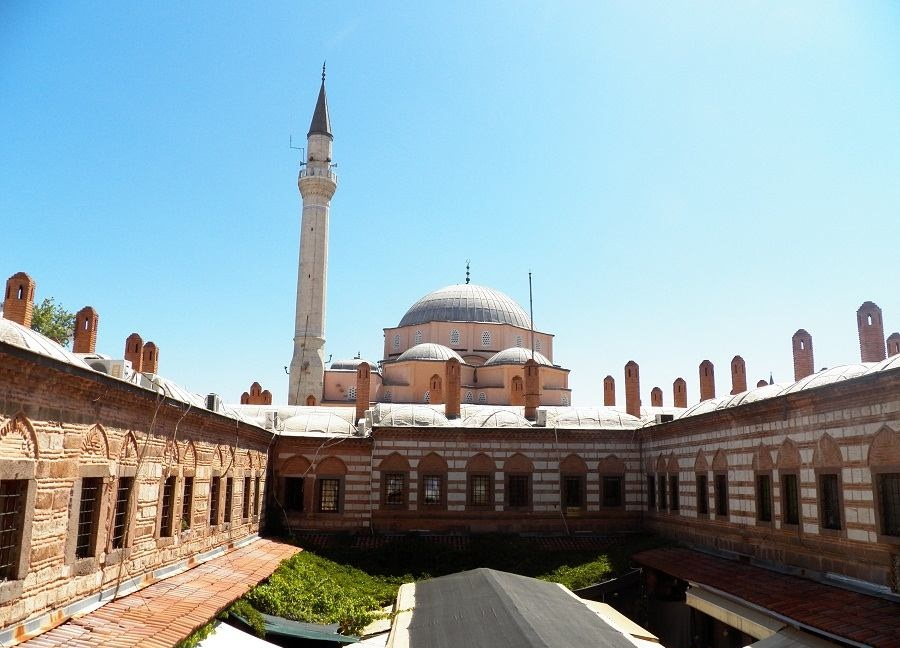
Hisar Mosque (1592–1598) in the Kemeraltı neighbourhood of İzmir

Kemeraltı (more fully, Kemeraltı Çarşısı) is a historical market (bazaar) district of İzmir, Turkey. It remains one of the liveliest districts of İzmir.

== Location ==
The district covers a vast area extending from the level of the Agora of Smyrna (the quarters of Namazgah, Mezarlıkbaşı and İkiçeşmelik), to the seashore along the Konak Square.

It is bounded by the streets Fevzipaşa Boulevard on the northeast, Eşrefpaşa Street on the southwest, and Halil Rıfat Bashaw Street on the southeast, surrounded by ridges of Kadifekale.

== History ==
The bazaar formed originally around a long street. In medieval times, it was called Street of the Mevlevis, in reference to the presence of a "dergah" (a building designed for gatherings of a Sufi brotherhood). During the 17th Century, this street was filled in, which allowed the bazaar to extend. Today, the street, now called Anafartalar Caddesi ("Anafartalar Street"), winds to complete the circle of the shallow inner bay in a wide curve.

=== 16th century ===
A milestone in the bazaar's development was the building in 1592 of the Hisar Mosque ("Fortress Mosque"). This is the oldest, most significant Ottoman landmark in İzmir (although built by Aydınoğlu Yakup Bey, descendant of the dynasty that had founded the Beylik, whose family the (Aydinids) had controlled İzmir prior to Ottoman conquest). "Fortress" in the name of the mosque refers to its predecessor, the Genoese Castle or Fortress of "San Pietro", earlier called Neon Kastron in Byzantine times, which stood on the same location. Final remains of the castle were removed during construction of new port installations (1867–1876).

=== 17th century ===
The market itself came into existence with the filling between 1650–1670 of the shallowest parts of the inner bay. The process of gaining ground from the bay was pursued in 1744 with the construction of Kızlarağası Han, an impressive caravanserai (and surviving to the present) that emerged as the nucleus of the market, together with two older "hans", the term implying a caravanserai with more markedly urban characteristics, that have not survived to this day. These was the "Great Vezir Han" constructed by the 17th-century grand vizier Köprülü Fazıl Ahmed Pasha, and the neighboring "Little Vezir Han" constructed by his successor Merzifonlu Kara Mustafa Pasha. Another historically important han (that no longer exists) was "Cezayir Han" (literally "Han of Algiers"), from where western Anatolia's excess labor force had been annually dispatched to the Ottoman protectorate of Algiers for centuries.

=== 18th-19th centuries ===
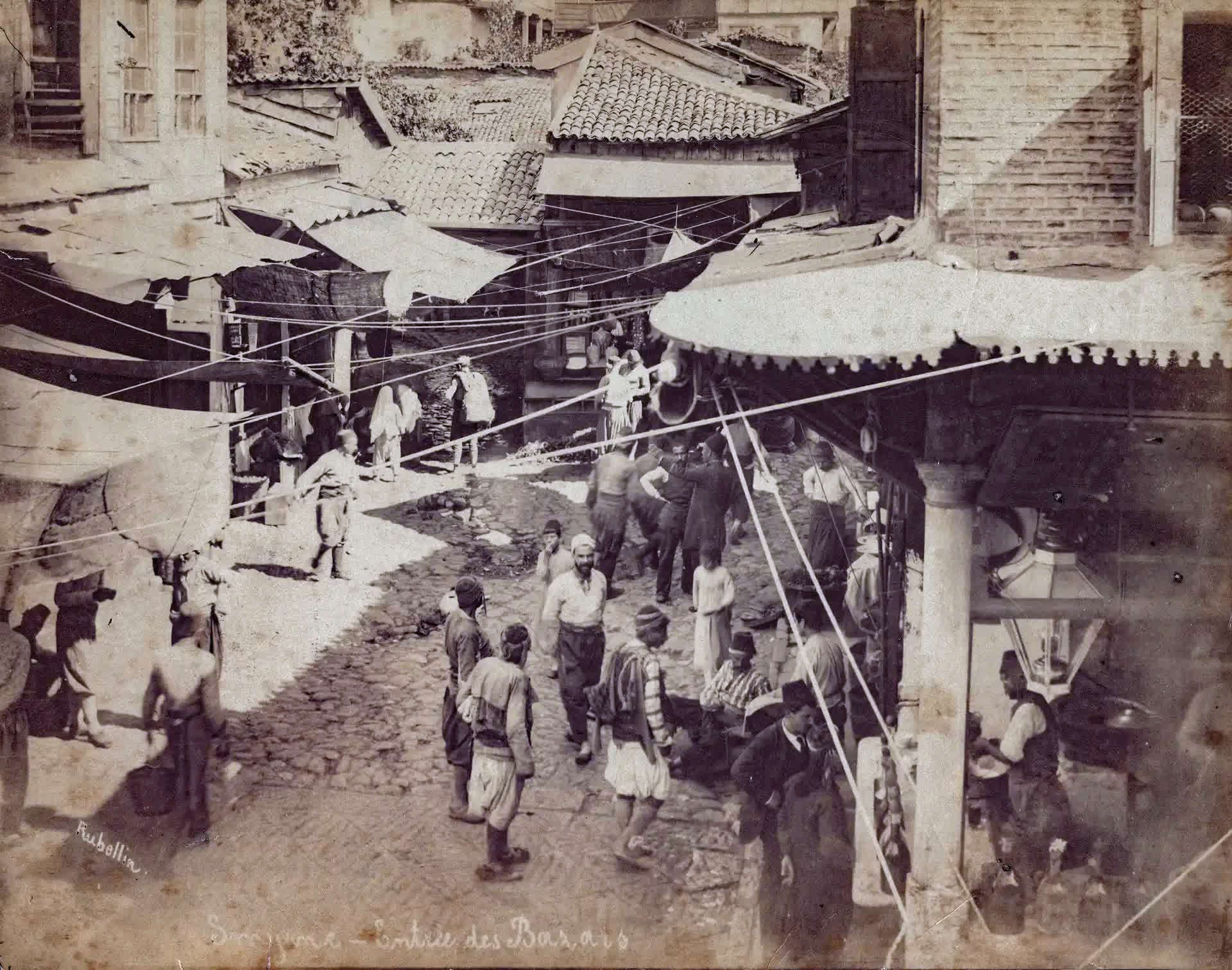
Entrance of the Kemeraltı, 1870-1890

The remaining part of the inner bay silted up throughout the 18th century. The shoreline facing Kemeraltı took its present straight form in the beginning of the 19th century, although some of the land along the berth remained unused until the end of that century. In 1829, Sarı Kışla, the Yellow Barracks, the principal Ottoman barracks of the city, gigantic for its time, was built immediately on the sea-side, and a private residence (konak), situated slightly diagonally behind the barracks, was extended and converted into the governor's mansion, demarcating Konak Square that holds its name from the mansion, and which in its turn gave the name to the central metropolitan district of İzmir (Konak) and at the level of which Kemeraltı is considered to start.

=== 20th century ===
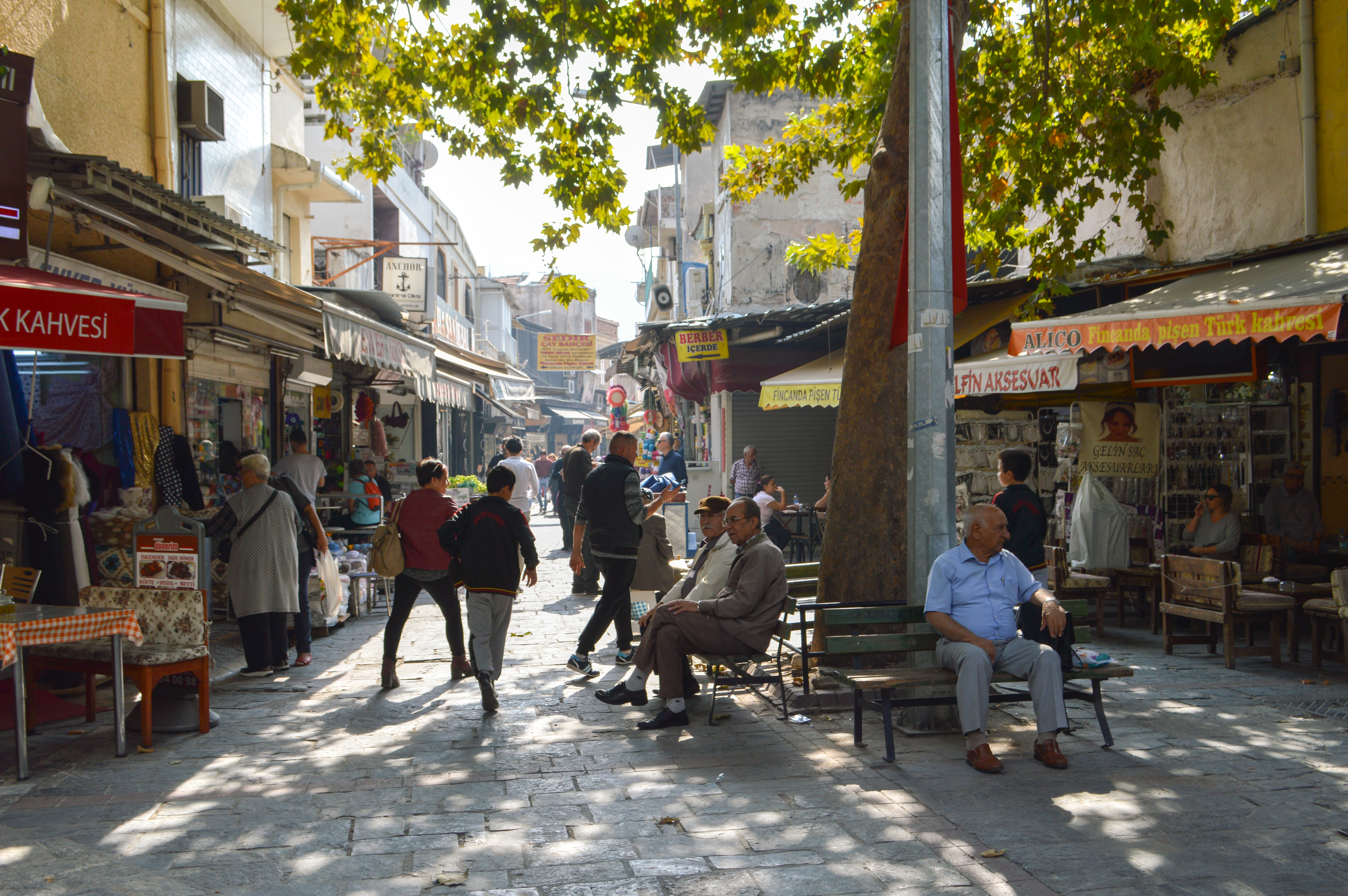
A typical street in Kemeraltı

After the 1922 Great Fire of Smyrna and thereafter, of hundreds of "hans" that Kemeraltı counted at the beginning of the 20th century (and clearly visible on a 1905 map drawn by French cartographers on behalf of international insurance companies), only a dozen remained, in full or in part: most were destroyed.

The governor's mansion still stands, although the Yellow Barracks was demolished in 1955 under instructions from the then Prime Minister Adnan Menderes, who wanted to see Konak Square re-shaped, to the ongoing regret of many İzmirians who had come to adopt the oversize building as one of the main landmarks of their city.

=== 21st century ===
Though the loss of shoe manufacturing in the 1990s left a void in the business well into the 2000s, eventually the commercial activities in Kemeraltı recuperated with the growth of Izmir's population throughout the 2010s. In 2020, Kemeraltı became a Tentative World Heritage Site as part of "The Historical Port City of Izmir."

== Mosques ==
Kemeraltı is home to Başdurak Mosque, Hisar Mosque, Kemeraltı Mosque, Kestanepazarı Mosque, Salepçioğlu Mosque, and Şadırvanaltı Mosque.

== Synagogues ==
In 2004, the World Monuments Fund added "Central Izmir Synagogues" as #81 to its World Monuments Watch annual list. The fund states:

Hidden behind walls and gardens, along the alleyways of the colorful historic bazaar, the Central Izmir Synagogues are an unparalleled testament to the city’s rich Jewish heritage. The oldest district in Izmir, Kemeralti dates back to Roman times and is home to the densest concentration of Jewish landmarks in all of Turkey. The six mosques surrounding the synagogue complex evince the centuries of peaceful co-habitation among the local Ottoman and Jewish communities.

A heritage organization, the "Izmir Project" (planned and partly funded by the Mordechai Kiriaty Foundation, the Izmir-Konak municipality, the Izmir Sephardic Cultural Heritage Association (ISCHA), and the American Friends of Izmir Jewish Heritage Museum) calls Izmir "the only city in the world in which an unusual cluster of synagogues bearing a typical medieval Spanish architectural style is preserved." At its peak, there were 34 synagogues in Izmir, "creating an historical architectural complex unique in the world." There, Sephardic Jews, originally expelled from Spain and Portugal (e.g., by the Alhambra Decree (or Edict of Expulsion) of 31 March 1492) came to Izmir with their Sephardic Jewish heritage, Ladino language, Sephardic traditions of worship.

This heritage included Sephardic architectural styles of synagogues that came from medieval Spain. The World Monuments Fund notes that Izmir synagogues often feature a “triple arrangement” of the Torah ark, "which creates a unique harmonious ambience." The central positioning of the bimah (elevated platform) between four columns divides synagogues into nine parts. The Izmir Project notes that this style features central stage upon which the ark for the Torah rests across the holy chest at the eastern wall. It includes a central platform, supported by four pillars that resemble a canopy for a ceiling. Seating around the stage allows members of a congregation to see each other's faces and adds to the bonding experience of public prayer (in contrast to Ashkenazi architectural style, in which seating lies in rows that limits eye contact).

A documentary film called Hidden Secrets of the Ancient Synagogues of Izmir presents a history and film some of the synagogues. A second documentary called About the Izmir Delegation shows some of the synagogues amidst discussions by Israel Jews about how to preserve them.

In addition to synagogues, there were at least four Jewish mezarliği (cemeteries): Gürçeşme, Bahribaba, Bornova, and Altındağ. A main attraction of Gurcesme is "the grave of Rabbi Palaggi, which was moved to this cemetery from its original burial place, in the 1920s... and people from all over the world come to pray at his grave" as "pilgrimage to Rabbi Palaggi’s grave." In 2013, a new, perhaps fifth Jewish cemetery.

=== Remaining synagogues ===
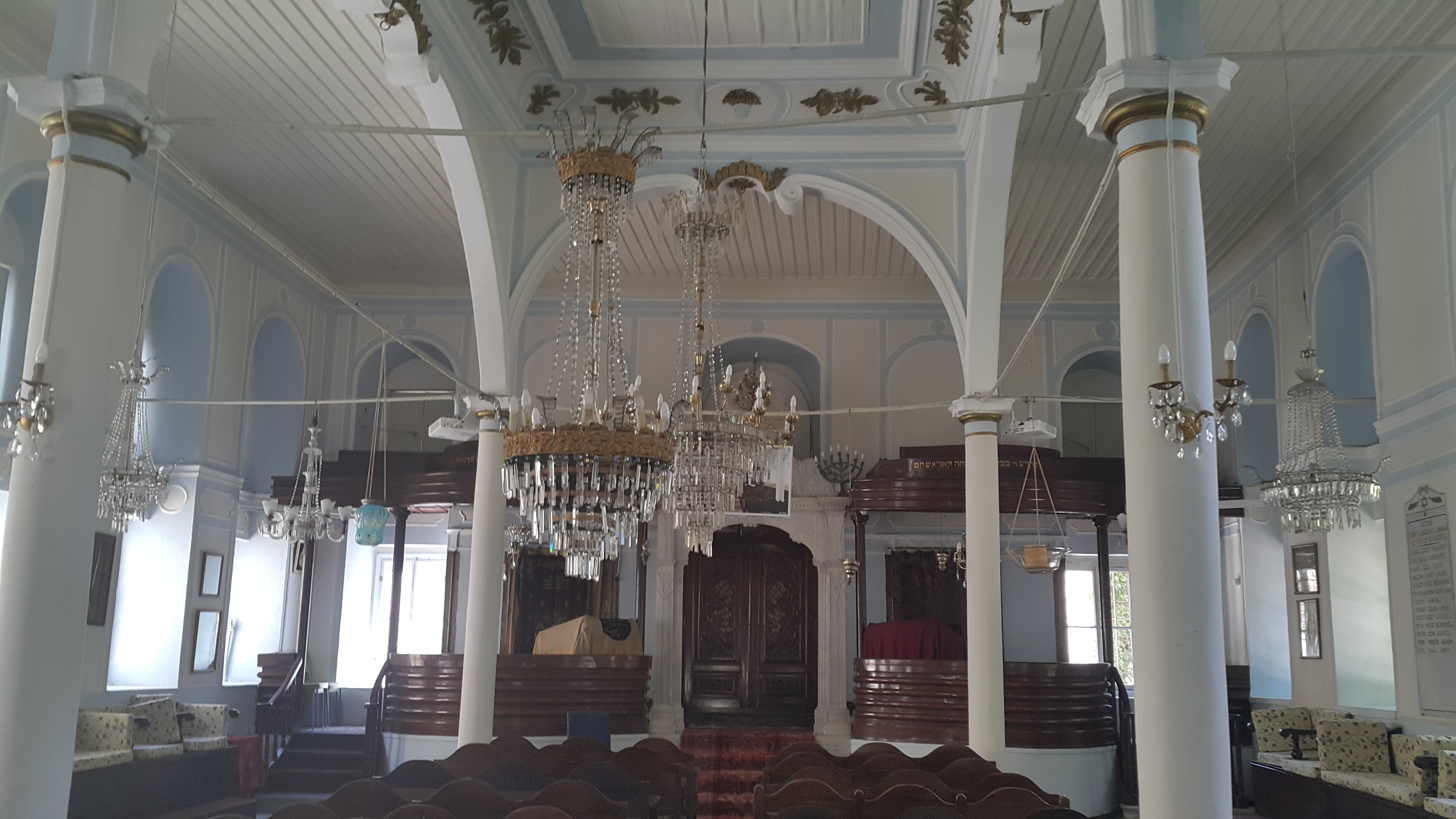
Interior of the Signora Giveret Synagogue

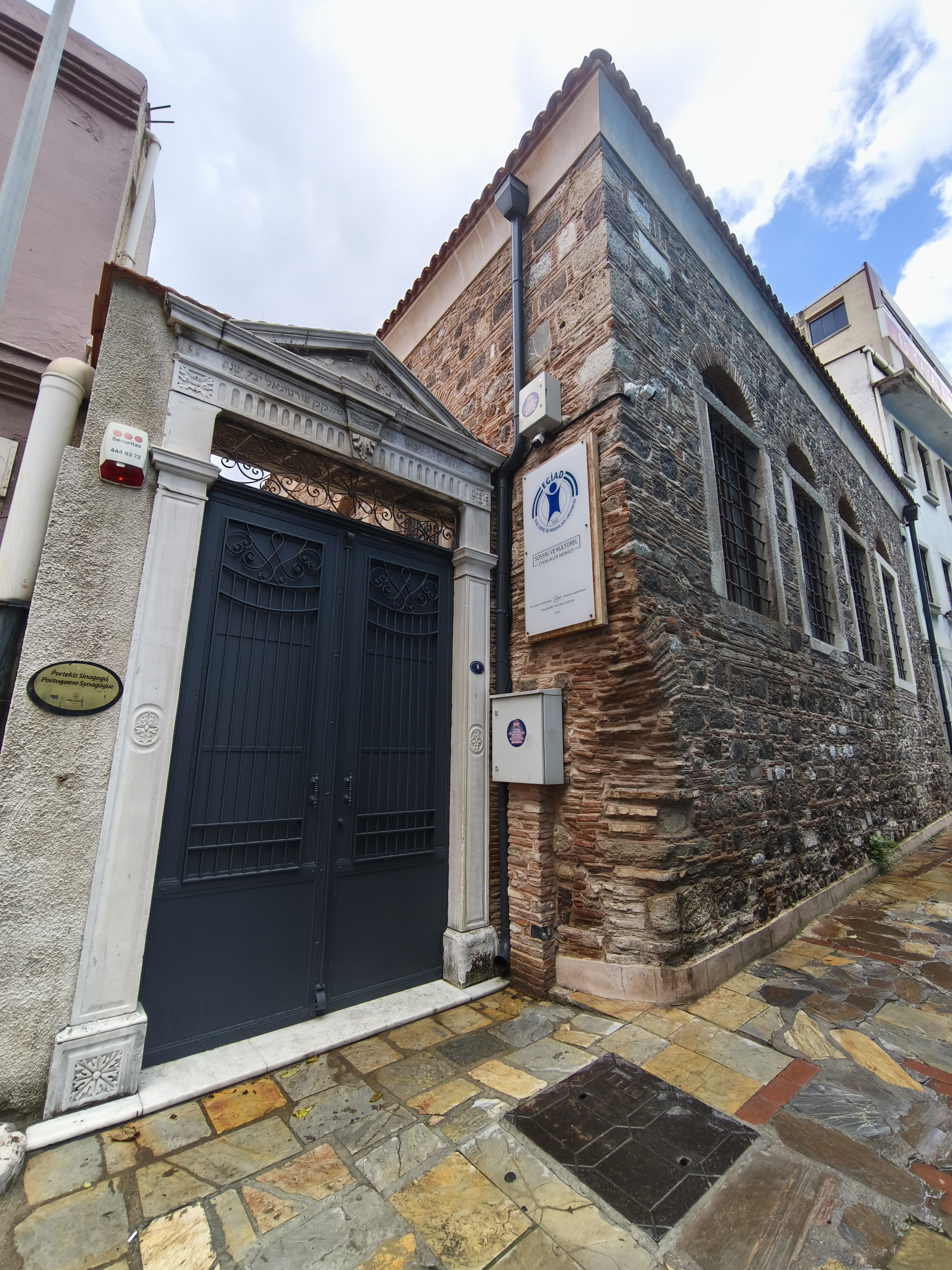
Exterior of the Portugal Synagogue

Of the 34 synagogues, eight remain today in the Kemeraltı Çaršisi area of Izmir (mostly on Havra Sokagi) and another 10 nearby. Some remain intact, some in ruins, and others are in the process of restoration. "These synagogues constitute a living testimony to the history of the community in Izmir, which was one of the most spectacular of its kind and had the most spiritual and cultural influence on all Jewish diaspora communities in the 17th and 18th centuries."

The remaining synagogues in or near the bazaar are:

- Ashkenazi Synagogue (20th-century, unrestored, inactive)
- Beit Hillel Synagogue (Avraham Palache Synagogue) (19th-century, restored 2014, inactive)
- Bikur Holim Synagogue (18th-century, restored, active)
- Algazi Synagogue (18th-century, restored, active)
- Etz Hayim Synagogue (14th-15th-century, restoration planned)
- Hevra Synagogue (17th-century, unrestored, inactive)
- Los Foresteros Synagogue (17th-century, unrestored, inactive)
- Portugal Synagogue (17th-century, unrestored, inactive)
- Señora Synagogue (17th-century, restored, active)
- Shalom Synagogue (17th-Century, restored, active)

=== Nearby synagogues ===
In Karataş:

- Bet Israel Synagogue (20th-century, restored, active)
- Rosh Ha-Har Synagogue (19th-century, restored, active)

In Karşıyaka:

- Kahal Kadosh Synagogue (19th-century, conservatory)

== See also ==
- Abraham Palacci
- Arcade: a covered passageway with stores along one or both sides.
- Bazaari
- Haim Palachi
- List of shopping malls in Istanbul
- List of synagogues in Turkey
- History of the Jews in İzmir
- Market
- Meena Bazaar: a bazaar that raises money for non-profit organizations
- Merchant
- Peddler
- Retail
- Shopping mall
- Souq
