= Signora Giveret Synagogue =

Synagogue in İzmir, Turkey

- Turkish: Sinyora giveret sinagogu
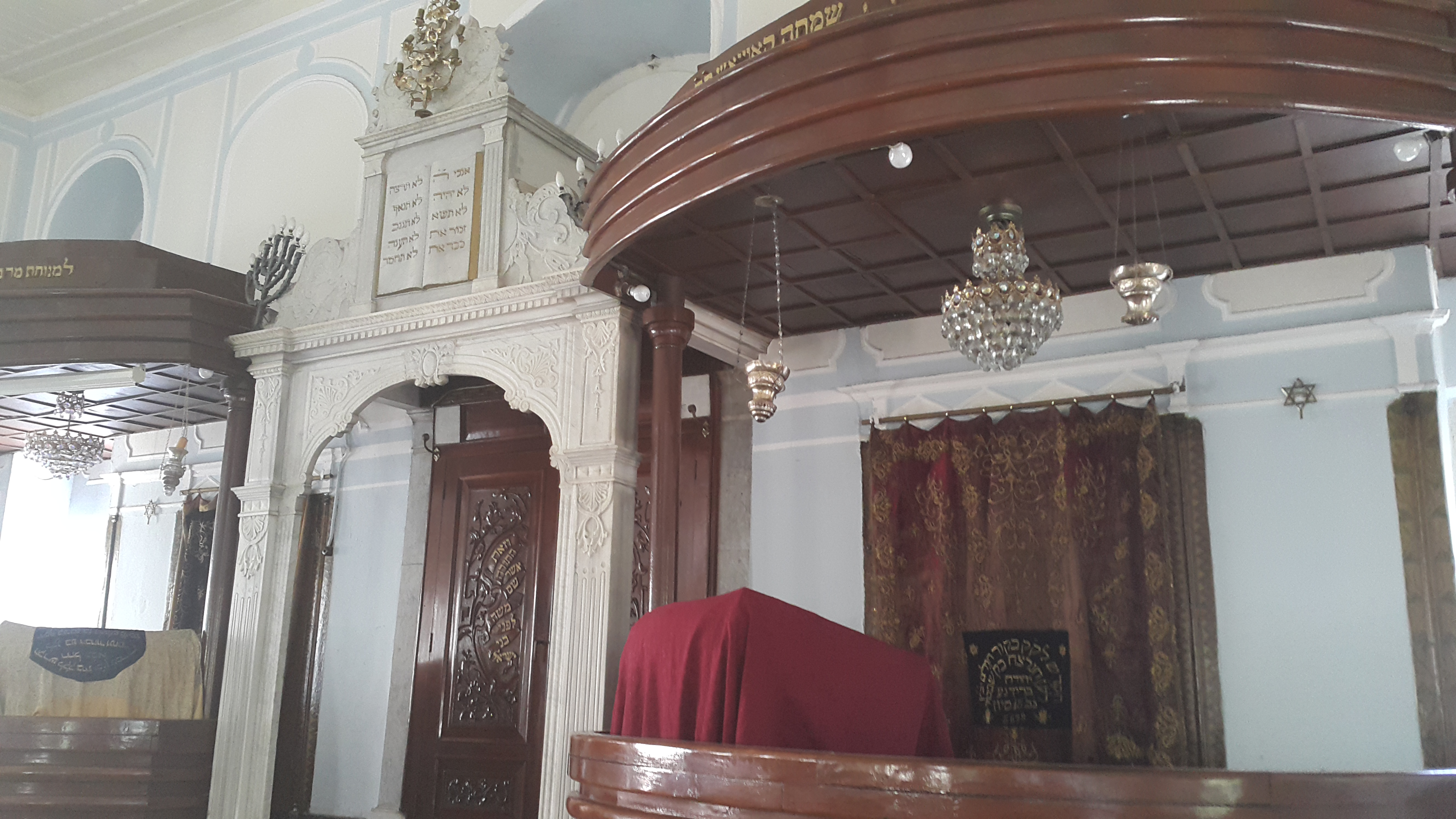
- Interior of the synagogue, in 2016

- Location of the synagogue near the Aegean Sea, in Turkey

Religion
- Affiliation: Judaism
- Ecclesiastical or organizational status: Synagogue
- Status: Active

Location
- Location: Kemeraltı, 927 Street (Havra Sokak), İzmir, İzmir Province
- Country: Turkey
- Interactive map of Signora Giveret Synagogue
- Coordinates: 38°25′12″N 27°08′08″E

Architecture
- Type: Synagogue architecture
- Completed: 16th century
- Materials: Stone

The Signora Giveret Synagogue (Turkish: Sinyora giveret sinagogu), also the La Signora (Geveret) Synagogue, is a synagogue located at Kemeraltı, 927 Street (known as Havra Sokak (‘Synagogue Street’)), in the city of İzmir, in the İzmir Province of Turkey. The synagogue dates from the 16th century and is in use today.

== History ==
The Signora Giveret Synagogue was built by Portuguese merchant Donna Gracia Mendes in 16th century. The building was damaged in the major fire of 1841, and subsequently restored by the Yeruşalmi family according to the original design. The new construction also used Italian architecture style.

== Architecture and features ==
=== Context ===
The Signora Giveret Synagogue has a big yard surrounded by massive, high walls that block the view from the outside. There are add-on structures in the yard that are referred to as Bet Midaş. Şalom and Algaze Synagogues, on Havra street, are neighboring buildings. The synagogue is located in Kemeraltı, a historic bazaar of İzmir, forming a network of small shops, stores and narrow streets which surround the synagogue.

Congregants access a terrace via a five-step stairway. The portable spruce wall of the synagogue merges with the torah ark. Seats are arranged linearly, similar to church interiors. The mechitza starts in the entrance hall open to the main interior. This space adjoins the hekal wall as a mezzanine which is separated by wooden latices. The structure is a double standard construction space and is seen as a single volume. It was constructed using stone masonry. The building has a wooden hip roof. The floor and ceiling are also wooden. The building entrance is a simple iron door. From the entrance one can see across the north facade of the building, which also has a simple view. Through a short hallway one can reach the yard and the entrance of the building. The building has modest furniture and many windows for natural light. Seats are arranged carefully and owners' names are carved on some of them. Some wooden seats are located on the sides, next to the walls.

=== Structural features ===
The building is made of stone and brick and has a rectangular floor plan. It is covered by a wooden hipped roof. One can reach the mechitza, which is on top of entering hall, through the yard. This space was placed against the hekal wall as a mezzanine which separated by wooden latices. In floor and ceiling contain tiles and wood. The inside contains bronze flowers surrounded by green geometric forms on the ceiling, spruce torah cabinet and bordeaux coverings. Since the building is masonry work, the window openings are arched. The windows in north and south facade give the building natural light.

== Gallery ==
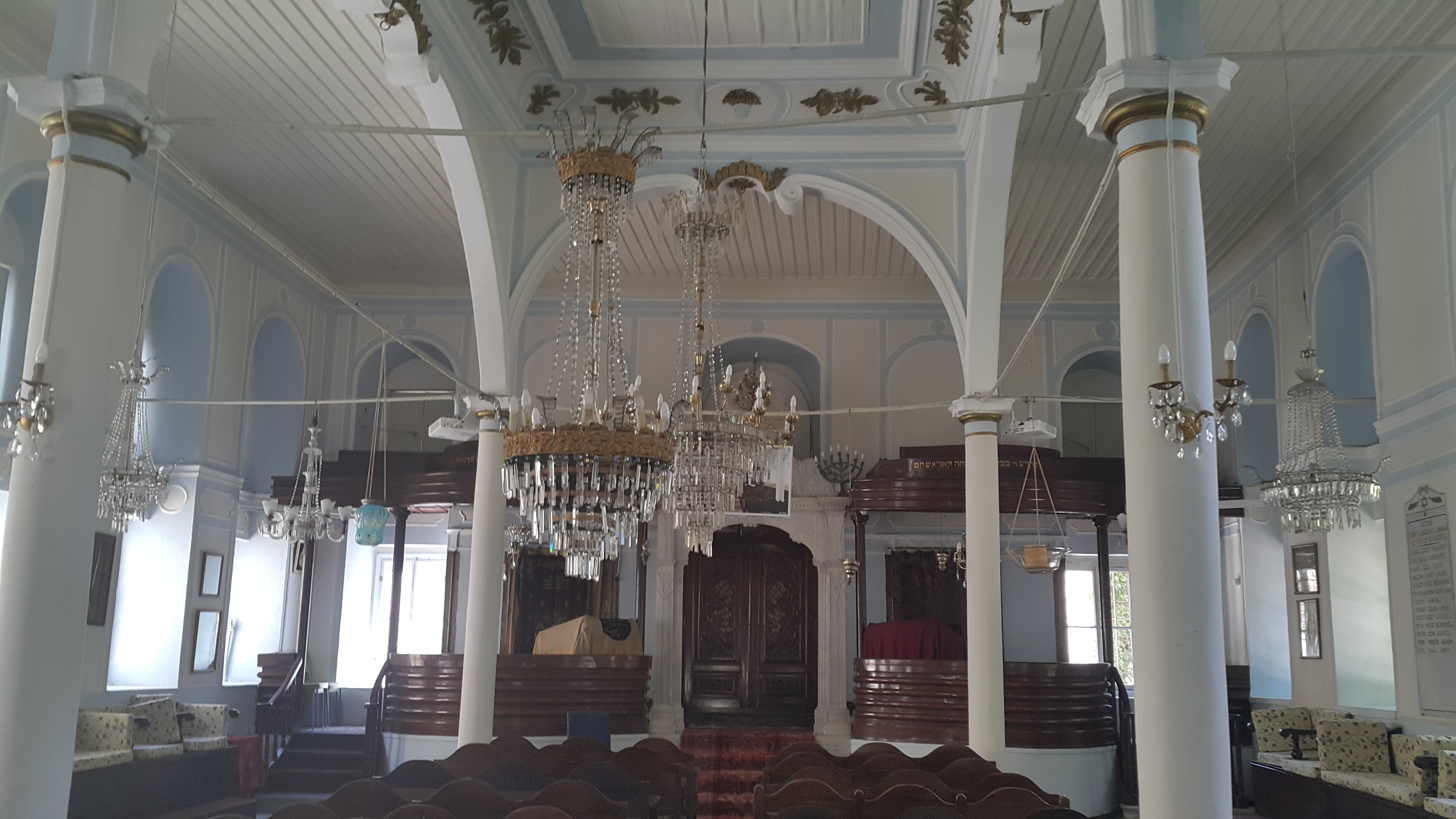
Interior of the Signora Giveret Synagogue of İzmir

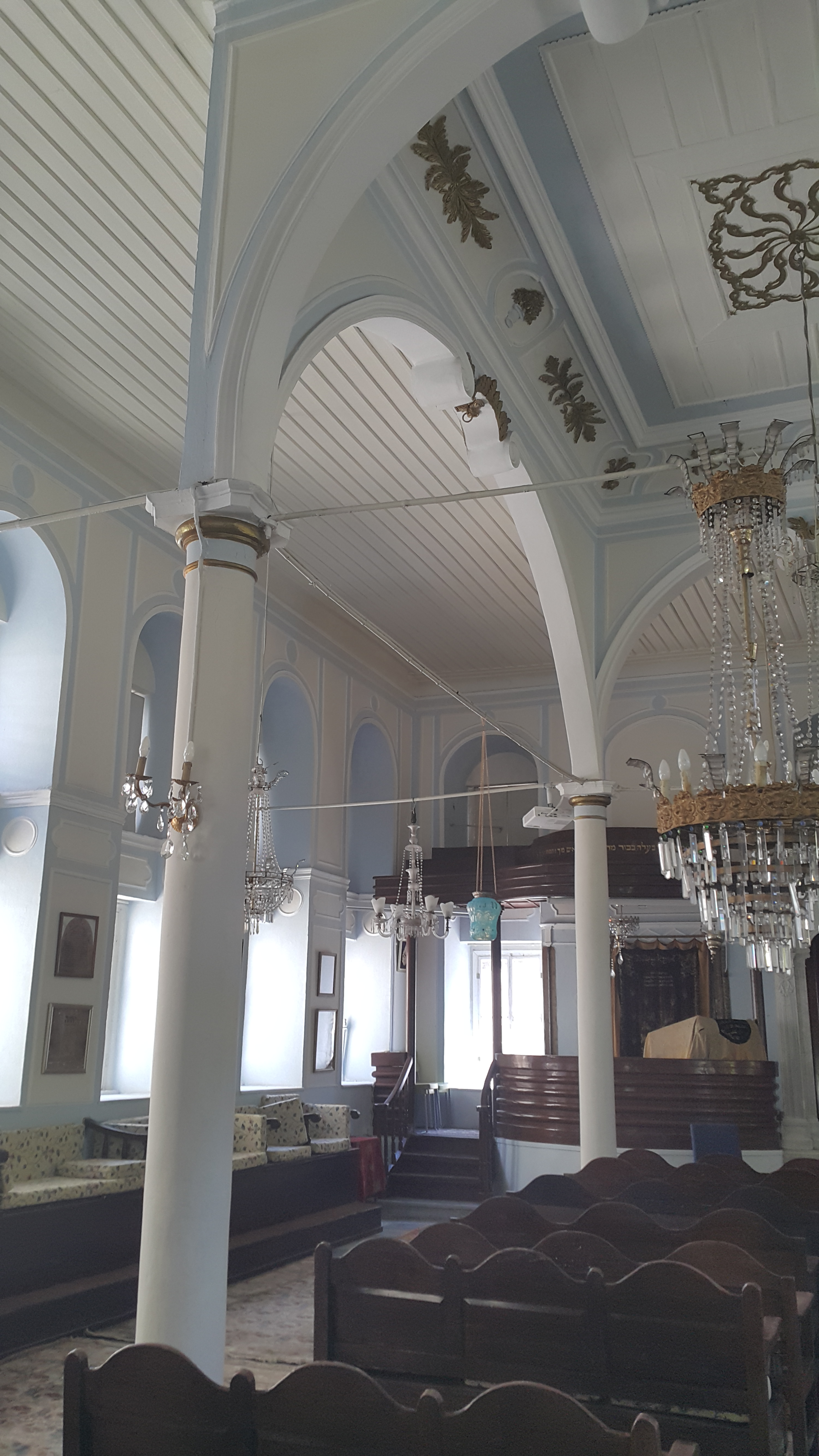
Interior of the Signora Giveret Synagogue of İzmir

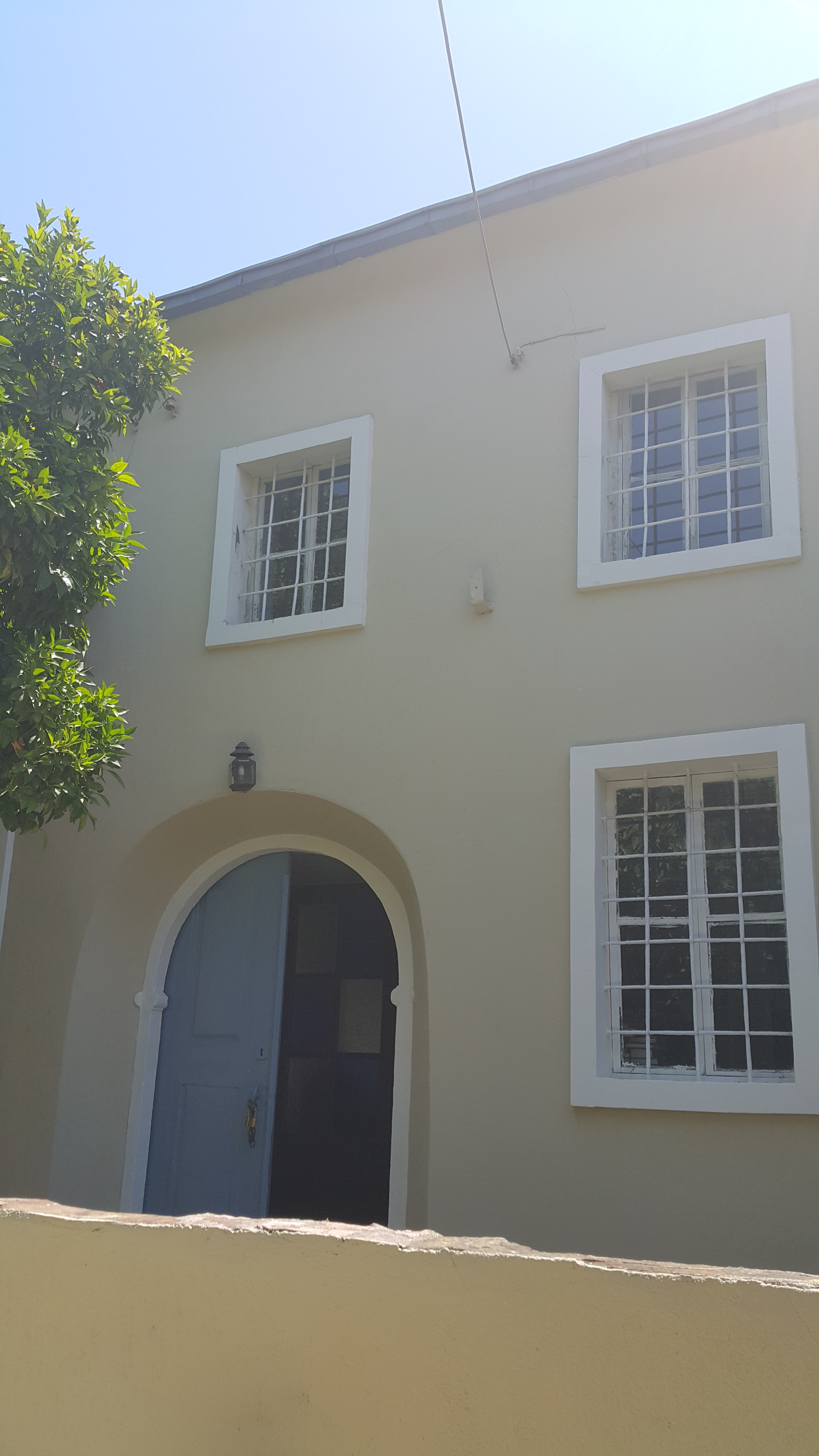
Exterior

== See also ==
- History of the Jews in İzmir
- History of the Jews in Turkey
- List of synagogues in Turkey
