= Karataş, Konak =

Neighbourhood in İzmir

Coordinates: 38.400°N 27.100°E

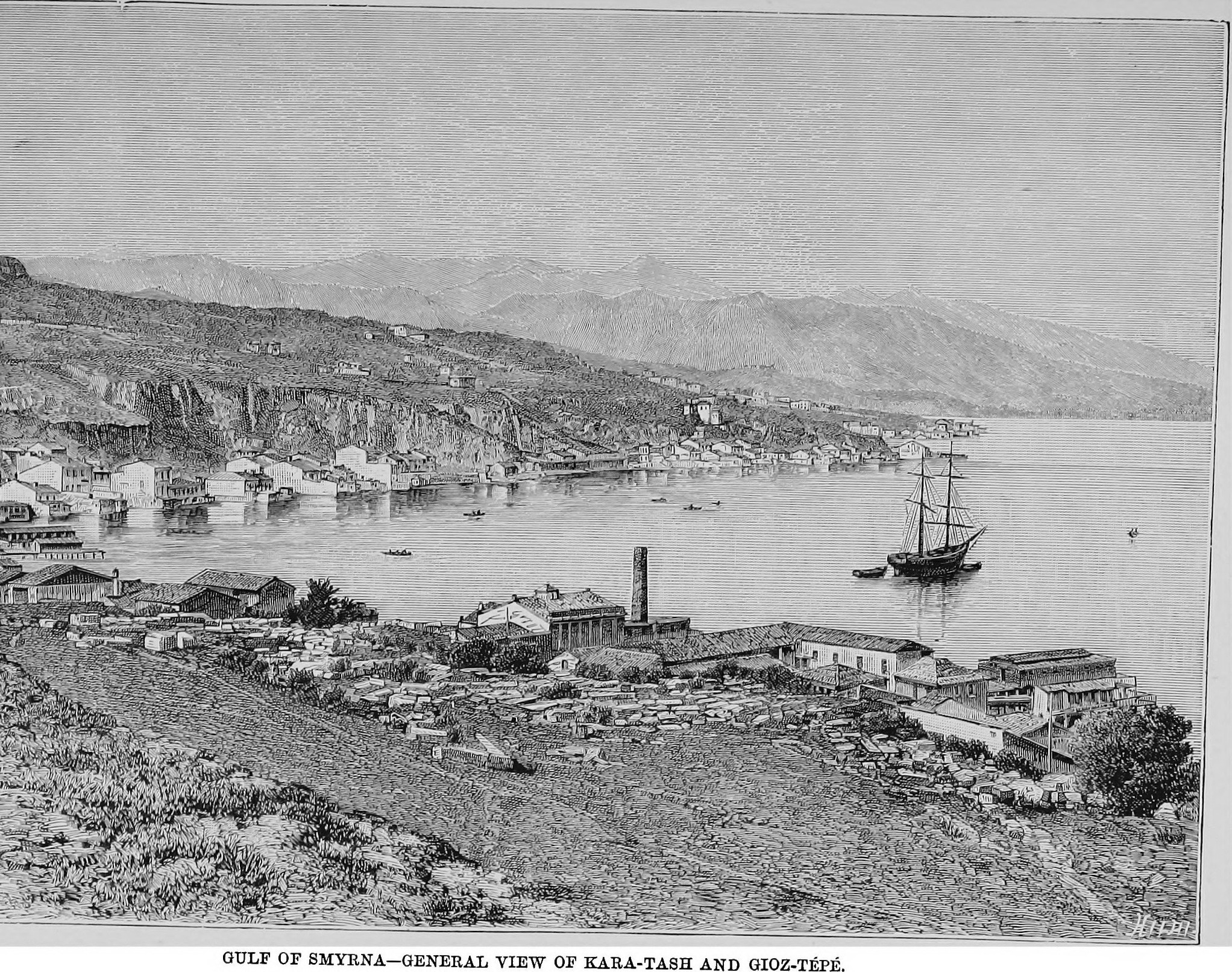
Karataş and Göztepe.

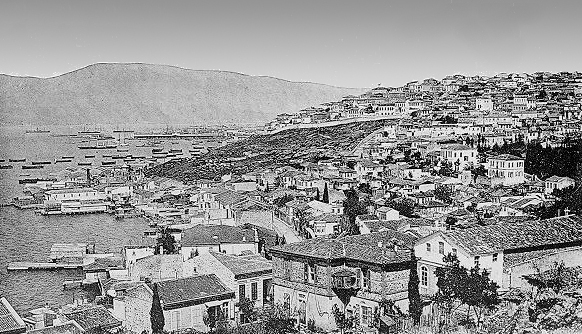
İzmir's Jewish quarter of Karataş around 1900 (Melantia was the alternative Greek name of the quarter)

Karataş (Ottoman Turkish: قره طاش) is a neighborhood of İzmir, Turkey, within the boundaries of the city's central metropolitan district of Konak. The neighborhood no longer has an official delimitation or status and exists as a notional zone (semt) that is admitted to stretch along the small cove of the same name (Karataş Cove (Koyu)) in the Gulf of İzmir. Its area roughly corresponds to the officially delimited quarter (mahalle) named Turgut Reis. The inhabitants, among whom neighborhood pride is quite developed, also usually declare living in Karataş.

Karataş is historically the part of İzmir where the city's Jewish population was concentrated, particularly for middle- to richer classes. In Ottoman times, the poorest were usually either concentrated in Mezarlıkbaşı quarter or around Havra Sokağı (Synagogue Street), both of which are located in or around Kemeraltı bazaar zone, or were scattered across the city. Karataş is still the area in İzmir where most members of the city's Jewish community continue to live.

== History ==
Along with most Jews in Turkey, İzmir's Jewish community is also overwhelmingly Sephardic, notwithstanding a continuous Romaniote Jewish existence in Anatolia dating back to the antiquity, as well as small scale migrations by Ashkenazi Jews into Ottoman lands (usually fleeing the persecutions in Central Europe) at various times.

The constitution of an organized Jewish community in Ottoman İzmir has its roots in the eviction of Jews from Spain in 1492, although it is almost certain that there was not a direct and immediate migration from Spain to the city of İzmir self. It is indeed interesting to note that, while the records do indicate small settlements by Sephardim Jewish migrants in such inland cities as Manisa, Akhisar, Turgutlu and Tire, the current day metropolis of İzmir goes unmentioned in the 16th century context. The early 20th century Turkish Jewish scholar, the virulent Turkish nationalist Avram Galante, who remains the principal reference for the Jewish history in Turkey, explained the absence of Jews in pre-17th century İzmir by the frequent plagues and wars in this coastal city, as well as by the preference Jews themselves have shown for such tax havens of the time as Selânik and Manisa.

A Jewish presence in community in İzmir is attested in Ottoman provincial surveys (tahrir defter) as of 1605 and in provenance of Selanik. But the core Jewish population of the city grew rapidly and soon, to reach at an estimated 7,000 in 1631 and to 15,000 in 1675, around the time Sabbatai Zevi proclaimed himself as messiah and thus sowed the seeds of a deep and lasting crisis and scission within the community. Concentrated at first in today's Kemeraltı bazaar area and pulsating along with the entire population of Ottoman İzmir, the more well-to-do Jewish residents of the city increasingly chose to live in the resort-like environment of Karataş as of 1865 when the area was officially opened for residential use.

The history of the Jewish community of İzmir was generally marked with stability despite the successive turmoils Turkey has been through. According to an 1856 British report presented to the Secretary of State for War, they numbered as many as 17,000 in İzmir at the time, and owing to the comparative liberty and immunity from oppression they enjoyed, their numbers were rapidly increasing. The same report, which has much to say also to the disadvantage of the Turks (on those of İzmir particularly, whereas it is full of elogies on the entirely Turkish region of Aydın), placed the unmolested Jewish community, afflicted neither with the wounded pride of Greeks, with whom everything became a national question, nor with the Armenians' constantly shifting definition of self-interest, on a footing that was apart from the other two. According to Rolleston, the Smyrniot Jew was generally tall, almost always fair-haired, with light and frequently blue eyes, a straight nose and a white skin. But whatever insults the Greek received at the hand of the Turk, according to the report, were transmitted by him to the Jew, and at seasons of religious excitement, such as the Greek Easter, it was unsafe for a Jew to be seen near the Greek quarter.

A number of blood libel cases brought the Jewish community of İzmir under harassment from the Greeks of the city at different times until 1921, who were also direct rivals in various trades. Although a rarity in Ottoman lands, repeatedly denounced by the sultans starting with Süleyman the Magnificent, the most serious of blood libel related troubles took place during the three months between April and June 1872, as reported by Henri Nahum. Although the official investigation had revealed the accusations as totally baseless in the specific case of the disappeared Greek child, later found dead by drowning with his skull fractured after his death and the Greek culprits also discovered in time, the quarter of Karataş was attacked on an almost daily basis during the three months and about sixty Jewish shops and houses were burnt in Karataş and Kemeraltı.

== Main sights ==
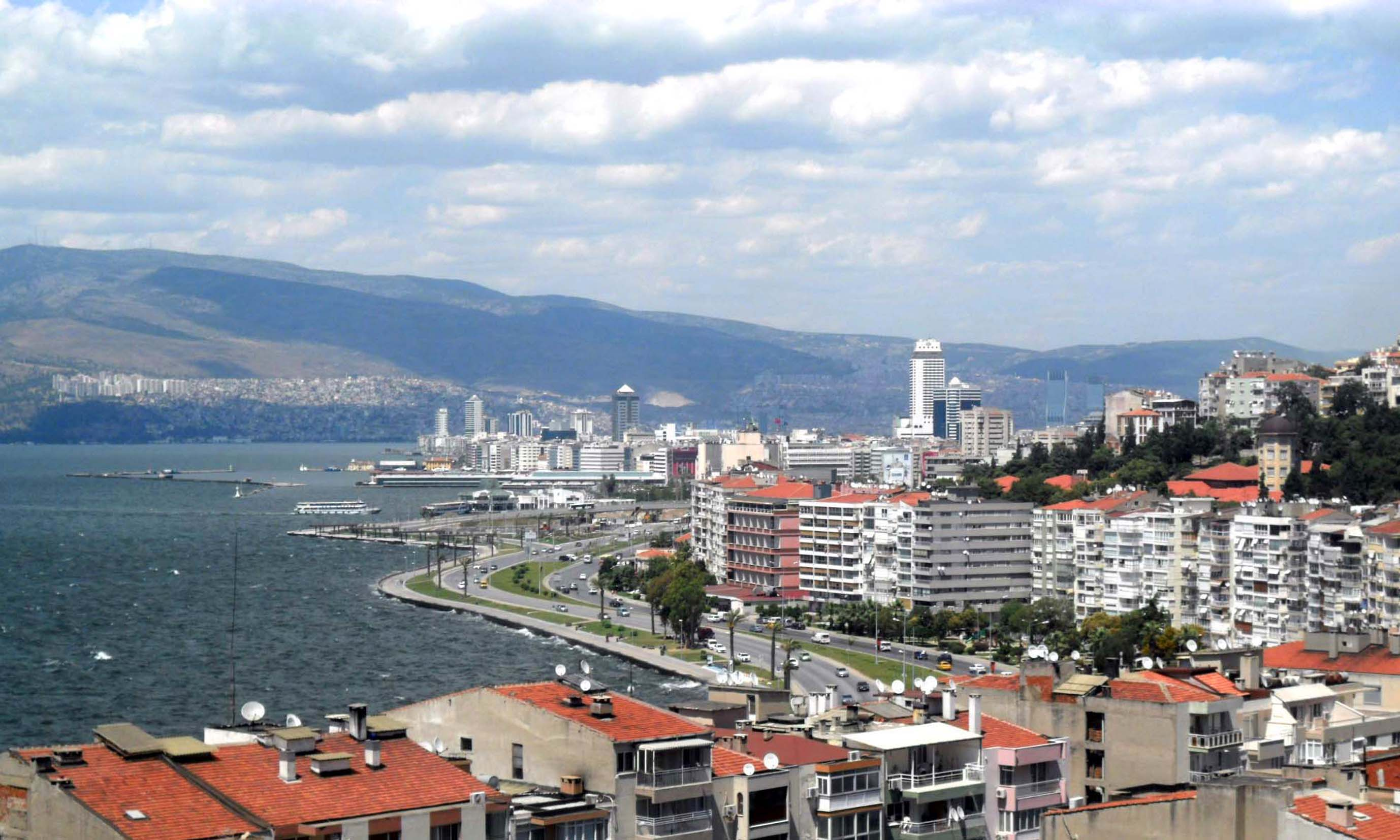
From Asansör in İzmir, Turkey 2014 (Compare with the image above)

Beth Israel, city's largest synagogue, and Karataş Hastanesi (also called Yahudi Hastanesi or "Jewish Hospital" locally), which is owned and operated by a Jewish foundation, are still operating. Many old houses in Karataş are lost by fires and destruction. Asansör, literally "the elevator", built in 1907 by a businessman named Nesim Levi to allow people to climb the elevated part of the area that is separated by the coastal strait by a steep cliff, is one of the principal landmarks of Karataş, as well as for İzmir as a whole. The street where Asansör is situated is named Dario Moreno Street (Dario Moreno Sokağı), in memory of the singer-composer who had actually bought a house for his mother in that street and had lived there during the first phases of his fame.

== See also ==
- Sabbatai Zevi
- Albert Jean Amateau
- Darío Moreno
- Aristotle Onassis
- History of the Jews in İzmir
- Balat – Istanbul's traditional Jewish quarter in the city's European part
- Kuzguncuk – Istanbul's traditional Jewish quarter in the city's Asian part
- Kemeraltı
- Rhodes blood libel case, February 1840
