= Bet Israel Synagogue (İzmir) =

Synagogue in İzmir, Turkey

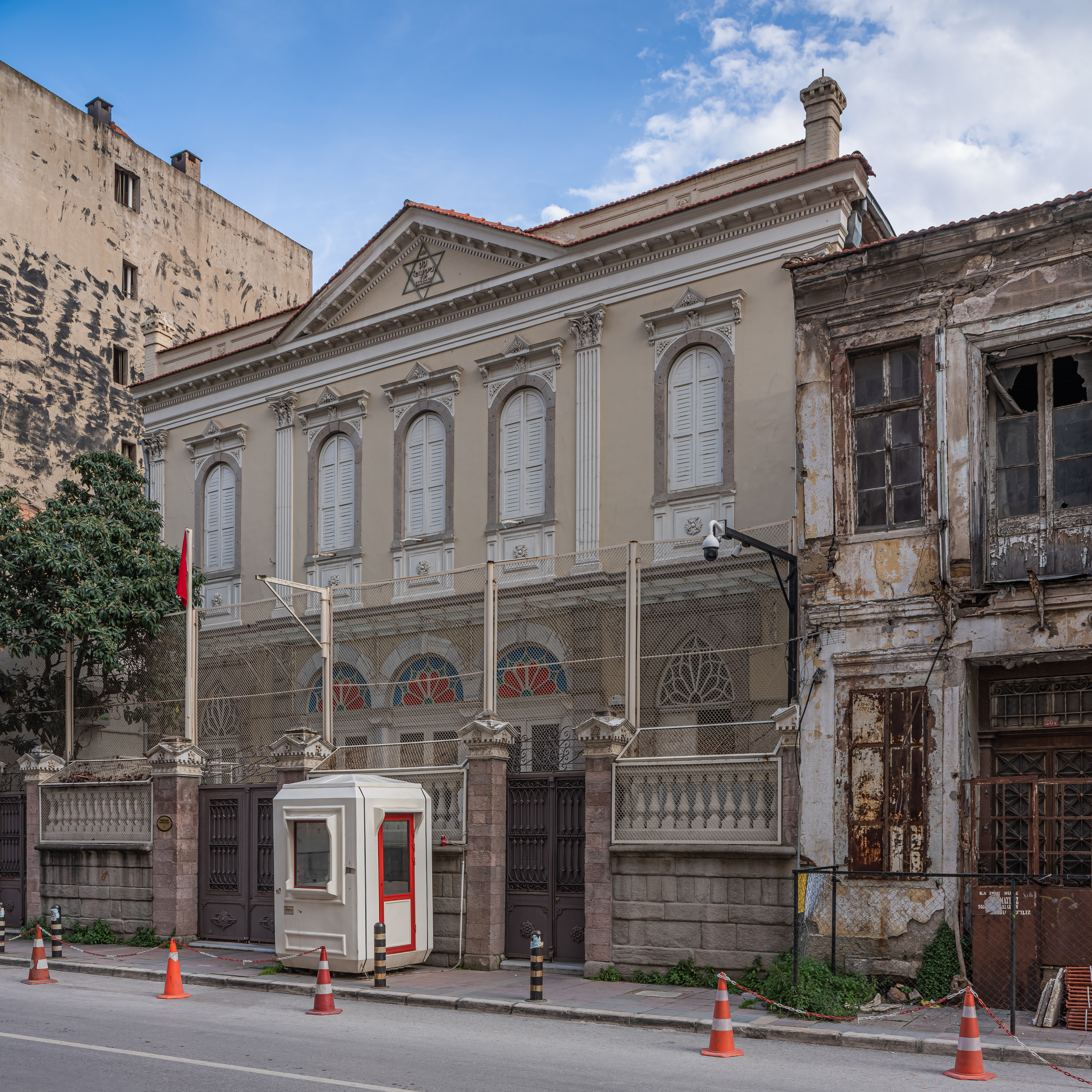
- The façade of the synagogue, in 2020

- Location of the synagogue near the Aegean Sea, in Turkey

Religion
- Affiliation: Judaism
- Rite: Nusach Sefard (Eastern)
- Ecclesiastical or organizational status: Synagogue
- Status: Active

Location
- Location: 265 Mithatpaşa Street, Karataş, İzmir, İzmir Province
- Country: Turkey
- Interactive map of Bet Israel Synagogue
- Coordinates: 38°24′34″N 27°06′59″E

Architecture
- Architect: Nissim Levi
- Type: Synagogue architecture
- Groundbreaking: 1905
- Completed: 1907; 1954 (renovations)

Specifications
- Dome: One
- Materials: Brick

The Bet Israel Synagogue, also known as the Beit Israel Synagogue, is a Jewish congregation and synagogue located at 265 Mithatpaşa Street, in the Turgut Reis neighbourhood, in the Karataş quarter of the city of İzmir, in the İzmir Province of Turkey. The synagogue was completed in 1907 and is the largest synagogue in the city, the other major synagogue being the Shaar Hashamaym Synagogue.

== History ==
İzmir's Jewish community was granted state permission to build the synagogue in 1905; it opened two years later.

After 1908, Rabbi Abraham Palacci served as the synagogue's hazzan. The synagogue was renovated in 1954.

On April 4, 2019, an attacker threw a Molotov cocktail at the synagogue. Falling on the sidewalk, the bomb did not destroy the synagogue. The attacker claimed that they were trying to protest the state of Israel. A prominent member of the ruling Justice and Development Party immediately condemned the attack. The official said, "There is no difference between attacks targeting synagogues, churches and mosques; they all target social peace with their hate." İzmir's Jewish community praised local law enforcement for their quick action.

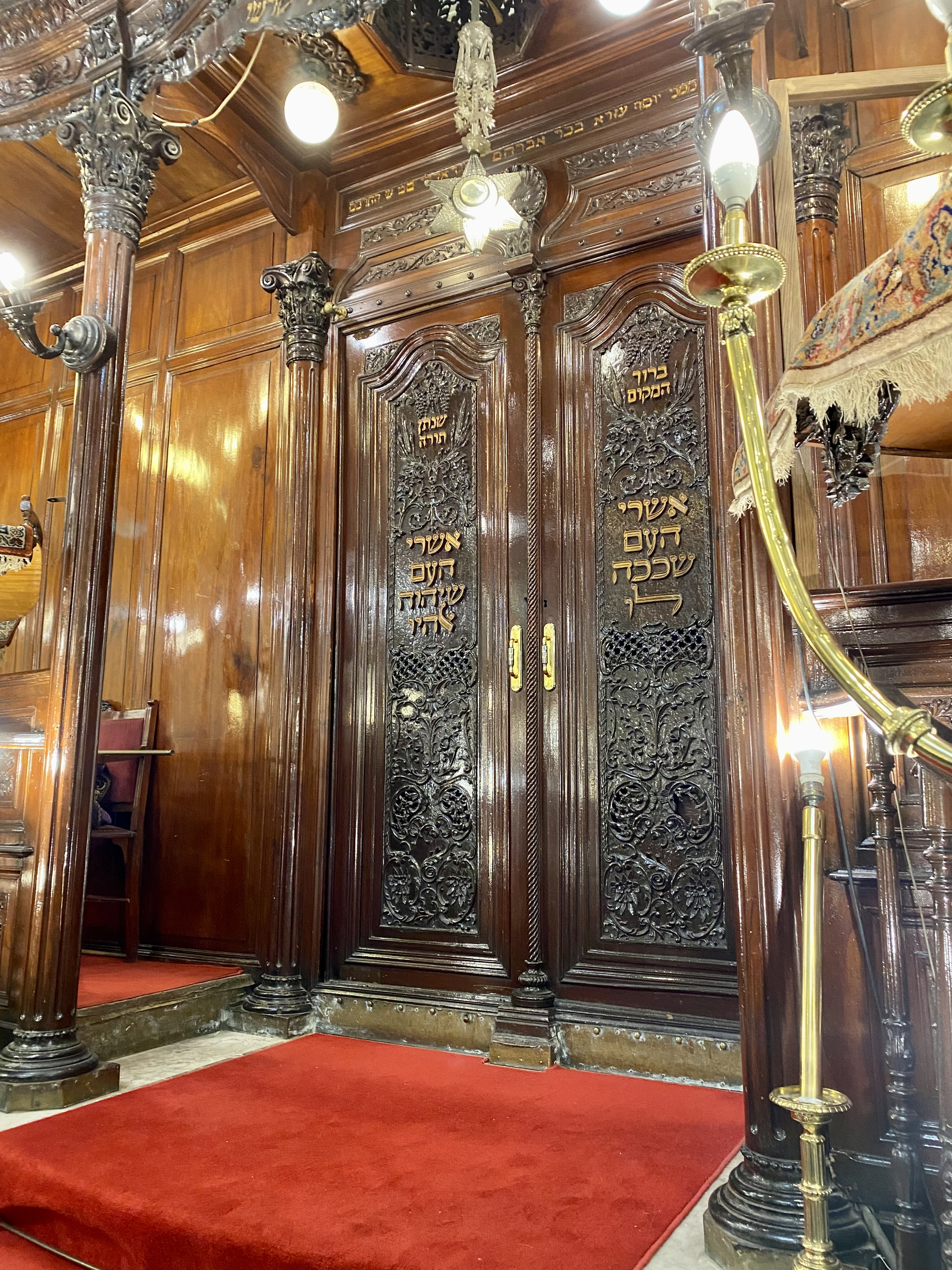
Interior of the synagogue

== See also ==
- History of the Jews in İzmir
- History of the Jews in Turkey
- List of synagogues in Turkey
