= 2004 World University Sailing Championship =

Sport competition

The 2004 World University Sailing Championship took place in İzmir, Turkey between July 4 and 8 2004. 25 men and 14 women from 7 countries participated at the third edition tournament.

== Participating nations ==
- Austria
- Hong Kong
- Hungary
- Japan
- Poland
- Slovakia
- Turkey

== Results ==
For this event, the FISU protocol was somewhat modified, so that the athletes were not given medals but rather they were awarded cups in the tradition of sailing competitions.

2004 World University Sailing Championship
Class	Gold	Silver	Bronze
470 mixed	(Austria) Matthias Schmid; Florian Reich	(Turkey) Levent Peynirci; Okan Akdağ	(Poland) Rafał Sawicki; Paweł Nowakowski
Laser; Men	(Poland) Marcin Rudawski	(Turkey) Kemal Muslubaş	(Poland) Patryk Kuczys-Lutomski
Laser; Women	(Poland) Katarzyna Szotyńska	(Japan) Mutsumi Hamaguchi	(Poland) Agnieszka Konys
Mistral One Design Men	(Poland) Piotr Myszka	(Japan) Makoto Tomizawa	(Slovakia) Martin Lapoš
Mistral One Design Women	(Hong Kong) Chan Wai Kei	(Poland) Natalia Kosińska	(Poland) Agata Brygoła

== Medal count table ==
2004 World University Sailing Championship
Pos	Country	Gold	Silver	Bronze	Total
1	Poland	3	1	4	8
2	Austria	1			1
2=	Hong Kong	1			1
4	Japan		2		2
4=	Turkey		2		2
6	Slovakia			1	1
	Total	5	5	5	15

== See also ==
- World University Championships
