= Agora of Smyrna =

Square of ancient İzmir

- İzmir Agorası (Turkish)
- Agora of İzmir
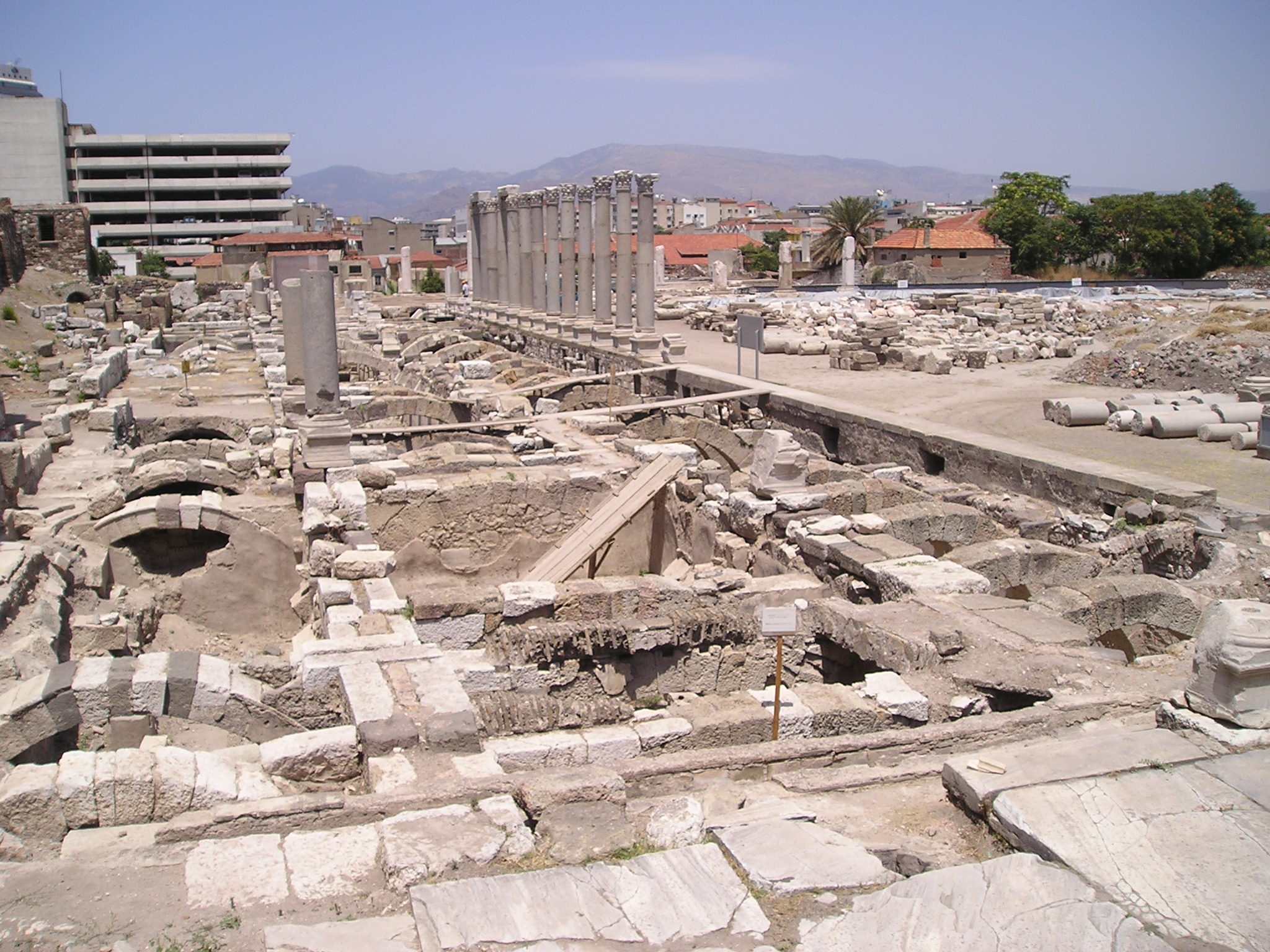
- Interactive map of Agora of Smyrna
- 38°25′08″N 27°08′16″E
- Location: İzmir, Turkey

History
- Built: 4th century BC

Site notes
- Material: Marble
- Excavation dates: 1933–present
- Public access: Yes

The Agora of Smyrna, alternatively known as the Agora of İzmir (Turkish: İzmir Agorası), is an ancient Roman agora located in Smyrna (present-day İzmir, Turkey). Originally built by the Greeks in the 4th century BC, the agora was ruined by an earthquake in 178 AD. Roman Emperor Marcus Aurelius ordered its reconstruction. Excavations started in 1933. In 2020, the Agora of Smyrna became a Tentative World Heritage Site as part of "The Historical Port City of Izmir."

== Buildings and structures of the agora ==
1. Faustina Gate
2. Ancient Street
3. North Stoa (Basilica)
4. West Stoa
5. Graffiti
6. Corinthian colonnade
7. Ottoman-era Muslim graveyard
8. House of Sabbatai Zevi
