= Ulus Sephardi Jewish Cemetery =

Cemetery in Beşiktaş, Istanbul

- Interactive map of Ulus Sephardi Jewish Cemetery

Details
- Established: 1901
- Location: Ulus, Beşiktaş, Istanbul
- Country: Turkey
- Coordinates: 41°04′27″N 29°01′39″E
- Type: Public
- Owned by: Neve Shalom Synagogue Foundation

The Ulus Sephardi Jewish Cemetery (Turkish: Ulus Sefarad Musevi Mezarlığı) or Arnavutköy Jewish Cemetery (Turkish: Arnavutköy Musevi Mezarlığı) is a burial ground of the Sephardi Jewish community in Istanbul, Turkey. It was established in 1901 during the Ottoman Empire era in Arnavutköy neighborhood of Beşiktaş district on the city's European side.

The cemetery is situated today in an area, which developed in the history from a countryside to an upscale neighborhood called Ulus. Its initial name Arnavutköy Jewish Cemetery is still in use today. It was reported that due to the location of the cemetery in the city's one of the most expensive quarters, only wealthy people are interred in the ultra-luxury Ulus Cemetery while people, who can not afford the very high amount of donation requested for a resting place, are transferred to the cemetery in Kilyos, which lies around 40 km (25 mi) far away from the city center in northern part of Istanbul. The religious burial service is provided at site by the Neve Shalom Synagogue Foundation, which also carries out the maintenance of the cemetery.

There exist another Jewish cemetery in Ulus, the Ulus Ashkenazi Jewish Cemetery (Turkish: Ulus Eşkenaz Musevi Mezarlığı), which is reserved for Ashkenazi Jews. It is about 500 m (1,600 ft) south of the Sephardi Jewish Cemetery on the same street.

Some other Jewish cemeteries in Istanbul are:

- Bağlarbaşı Jewish Cemetery (Bağlarbaşı Musevi Mezarlığı)
- Hasköy Karaite Jewish Cemetery (Hasköy Karaim Musevi Mezarlığı)
- Hasköy Sephardi Jews Cemetery (Hasköy Sefarad Musevi Mezarlığı)
- Judeo-Italiano Community Cemetery (İtalyan Musevi Cemaati Mezarlığı
- Kilyos Jewish Cemetery (Kilyos Musevi Mezarlığı)
- Kuzguncuk Nakkaştepe Jewish Cemetery (Kuzguncuk Nakkaştepe Musevi Mezarlığı)
- Ortaköy Jewish Cemetery (Ortaköy Musevi Mezarlığı)

== Notable burials ==
- Rav İsak Haleva 3rd Chief Rabbi (Hakham Bahi) of the Republic of Turkey.
- David Asseo (1914–2002), Hakham Bashi (or Chief Rabbi) of the Republic of Turkey from 1960 until his death
- Monik Benardete (1950–2010), celebrity and philanthropist
- Üzeyir Garih (1929–2001), businessman and cofounder of Alarko Holding
- Vitali Hakko (1913–2007), businessman and founder of the Vakko clothing business

== See also ==
- List of cemeteries in Turkey
- History of the Jews in Turkey
