= Beki Luiza Bahar =

Turkish-Jewish playwright (1926–2011)

- Born: Beki Luiza Morhayim; 16 December 1926; Istanbul, Turley
- Died: 19 August 2011 (aged 84); Istanbul, Turkey
- Spouse: Jojo Yusuf Bahar
- Children: Sara, Roza, İzzet
- Writing career
- Language: Turkish, Ladino
- Genres: Plays, Poems
- Notable works: Boğaz'da Ortaköy'de; Senyora Grasya Nasi; Efsaneden Tarihe Ankara Yahudileri
- Notable awards: Yunus Emre Achievement Award; 1995

Beki Luiza Bahar (née Morhayim; 16 December 1926 - 19 August 2011) was a Turkish-Jewish writer and playwright.

She was Turkey's first known female Jewish playwright. Best known for her historical creations, her plays were staged by the General Directorate of State Theaters and many theater companies in Turkey.

Apart from her plays, she wrote poetry, essays, research and her memoirs. She published articles in many newspapers and magazines of Turkey. Her best-known works are Efsaneden Tarihe Ankara Yahudileri (The Jews of Ankara from Legend to History) and Altmış Yılın Ardından (After Sixty Years) in which she compiled her memories. She also wrote poems in Ladino.

== Biography ==
Bahar was born in Istanbul on 16 December 1926, to Sara (Benbiçaçi) and Jak Morhayim. She attended the Beyoğlu Jewish School in Istanbul. When her family moved to Ankara in 1937 due to her father's job, she completed her education at the TED Ankara Koleji. She studied law at the University of Istanbul, but did not complete her studies.

She got married in 1948 to the businessman Jojo Yusuf Bahar and had two daughters, Sara and Roza, and a son, İzzet.

== Career ==
From 1958, her essays, research, travel notes and poems began to be published in many magazines and newspapers. After her first article was published in Haftanın Sesi in 1958, her first poem was published in the Varlık Anthology of New Poems (Yeni Şiirler Antolojisi) in 1959, and her first short story was published in the magazine Çağdaş in 1964. Her first play, Albora, was staged by Haldun Taner at Ankara State Theater in 1970.

She returned to Istanbul with her family in 1980. Once there, she continued to publish articles in the Jewish newspaper Şalom as well as the Turkey-based magazines Eflatun, Tiryaki, Konya Çağrı, Göztepe, Gelişim and other publications published by Turkish immigrants to Israel.

For the 500th anniversary of the Alhambra Decree and the subsequent Expulsion of Jews from Spain, she wrote the poem Azan, Çan, Hazan, better known as Boğaz'da Ortaköy'de (In Ortaköy-on-the-Bosphorus), which was engraved and placed on a plaque in the Ortaköy Pier Square on 26 April 1992, after the poem being read by the mayor of Ortaköy. The words "Azan, Çan Hazan" became very popular, and eventually became the title of a documentary series. The Turkish composer Ali Kocatepe wrote a song named "Azan, Çan Hazan".

Her play, Senyora Grasya Nasi, dedicated to Grasia Mendes Nasi earned her the Yunus Emre Achievement Award of the Bakırköy Municipality in 1995; it was translated into French in 2001. Her play Ölümsüz Kullar (Immortal Slaves) entered the repertoire of the State Theater in 1997; but has not yet been put on stage. Some of her unpublished plays have been staged in Jewish community centers in Istanbul.

Some of the articles she wrote during forty years in various publications were compiled under the name of Ne Kendi Tanır Ne de Söz Edeni Vardır (She neither knows nor talks), which was published as a book in 2000.

== Death ==
Bahar died in 2011, aged 84. She was buried in the Ulus Ashkenazi Jewish Cemetery due to the overpopulation of the Ulus Sephardi Jewish Cemetery, located 500 meters away, in Arnavutköy.

== Works ==
=== Poems ===
- Yakamozlar (1963)
- Kişi Bunalımı+Dişi Bunalımı (1970)
- Doğada Düğün (1989)
- Koronas (2002) (in Ladino)

=== Plays ===
- Ölümsüz Kullar (Pudu-Hepa, 1973)
- İkiyüzbininci Gece (1986)
- İkizler, (1986)
- Sıradan Bir Şey (1984)
- Donna Grasya Nasi (1993)

=== Essays ===
- Efsaneden Tarihe: Ankara Yahudileri (2003)
- Bir zamanlar Çıfıt Çarşısı (2010)

=== Unpublished plays ===
- Balat'tan Bronx'a (musical)
- Bir Bütün
- Alabora

=== Memories ===
- Ordan Burdan Altmış Yılın Adından (1995)

=== Anthology ===
- Ne Kendi Tanır Ne de Söz Edeni Vardır (2000)
