= David Asseo =

4th Chief Rabbi of the Republic of Turkey (1914–2002)

- Born: 1914; Istanbul, Ottoman Empire
- Died: July 14, 2002 (aged 88); Istanbul, Turkey
- Occupation: Chief Rabbi of Turkey
- Years active: 1961–2002

Chief Rabbi David Asseo (1914 – July 14, 2002) was the Hakham Bashi (Chief Rabbi) of the Republic of Turkey from 1961 until his death in 2002.

Asseo was the second longest-serving chief rabbi in Europe (after Moses Rosen of Romania). In his career, he spent 40 years as the chief rabbi and spiritual leader of Turkey. His deputy of seven years, Ishak Haleva, succeeded him after his death.

He was buried at the Ulus Sephardi Jewish Cemetery in Istanbul.

== Early life and education ==
Asseo was born in Istanbul, where he attended a religious school in Hasköy. In 1928 he received the Lodge D'Orient Béne Berith scholarship to the Rhodes yeshiva, where he studied for 6 years. He became fluent in Hebrew, French, Italian, Greek and Ladino, a language derived from Spanish spoken by many in Turkey's Jewish population.

After his studies he returned to Istanbul and became a Hebrew teacher at the Jewish High School in Istanbul. From 1933-1936 he completed his military service.

== Career ==
In 1936 he became a member of the Bet Din, and later became the secretary as well as the private secretary to Chief Rabbi Rafael Saban, in the rabbinical court.1955 Rabbi Asseo became headmaster and co-founder of an academy of Jewish learning in Haskoy.

Asseo became the Chief Rabbi on December 9 1961. He represented the jewish community in meetings with many notable political leaders. He represented the 22,000 Jews in Turkey, most of who were descendants of the sephardic jews who fled Spain to Turkey in the 1400s.

He was the Chief Rabbi during the Neve Shalom massacre an attack on the largest synagogue in Turkey killing 22 worshippers in 1986.
