= Neve Shalom Synagogue massacre =

1986 terrorist attack in Turkey

- Part of the Arab–Israeli conflict
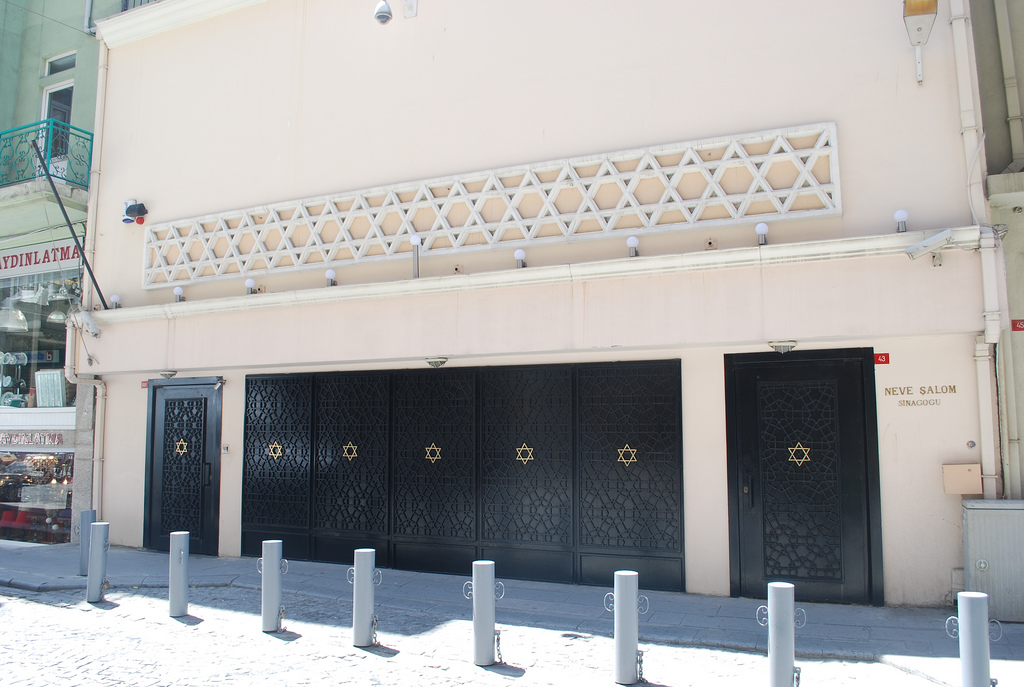
- The Neve Shalom Synagogue
- Location: 41.02669°N 28.97242°E; Neve Shalom Synagogue, Istanbul, Turkey
- Date: September 6, 1986
- Deaths: 22
- Perpetrator: Abu Nidal Organization (suspected)
- No. of participants: 2

The Neve Shalom Synagogue massacre happened on 6 September 1986 when a group of suspected Abu Nidal Organization terrorists killed 22 worshipers inside the Neve Shalom Synagogue in Istanbul, Turkey.

== Background ==
The Neve Shalom Synagogue was a Sephardic synagogue in Istanbul's Beyoglu district. It had been closed for repairs. Shabbat morning on 6 September 1986 marked its reopening.

== Attack ==
Around 9:17am of 6 September 1986 during Shabbat services, when worshippers were reciting the Shabbat parasha, a pair of terrorists entered on the men's side of the mechitza and opened fire on the crowd with machine guns. They then doused the bodies of the dead and injured with gasoline, which they lit on fire. A witness said that he heard the gunmen speaking Arabic among themselves.

The attackers took out "extremely powerful" grenades and blew themselves apart, killing themselves and disfiguring their bodies so badly that investigators were unable to identify who they were. The grenades set off a fire in the building that lasted several hours.

The assailants gained access by posing as television cameramen assigned to cover the event for Israeli television. One of them spoke Hebrew to a guard.

By the end of the massacre, 22 people had been killed. The victims ranged in age from 30 to 82. Three of the people killed were Persian Jews, including an Iranian-born rabbi. Around two dozen were wounded, including four women hit by splinters in the women's gallery. The death toll would have been higher if a Bar Mitzvah planned for that morning had not been cancelled.

== Aftermath ==
Two previously unknown Lebanese groups both separately claimed responsibility for the massacre, but the authenticity of the claims have been doubted. The Palestinian Abu Nidal Organization, although it never claimed responsibility, was widely suspected of perpetrating the attack, which bore the group's stamp. Turkish police suspected the shooting was done by Abu Nidal but with the assistance of other groups, which it believed were likely Iran, Libya and Syria.

All the victims were buried in a special section of the Ulus Ashkenazi Jewish Cemetery.

== Reactions ==
The Neve Shalom massacre was widely condemned in Turkey and internationally. The Cabinet of Turkey arranged a special session shortly after on Prime Minister Turgut Özal's orders, who described the incident as "heinous" and "odious assault." Jewish synagogues and institutions were provided heavy security in fear of another attack. President of the United States Ronald Reagan wrote a letter to the Jewish community of Istanbul sharply condemning the massacre.

Israeli Prime Minister Shimon Peres denounced the attack as "beastly" and vowed "not [to] rest until we cut off this murderous hand." Simon Wiesenthal Center associate dean Abraham Cooper said the massacre was a "resurrect[ion of] the imagery and savagery of the Holocaust."

== See also ==
- Great Synagogue of Rome attack
- List of attacks attributed to Abu Nidal
- Terror attacks in Istanbul
