= Vitali Hakko =

Turkish businessman (1913–2007)

- Born: 1913; Yedikule, Istanbul, Ottoman Empire
- Died: 10 December 2007 (aged 93–94); Istanbul, Turkey
- Occupation: Businessman
- Known for: Founder of the Vakko

Vitali Hakko (1913 – 10 December 2007) was a Turkish Jewish businessman, founder of the Vakko clothing business.

Hakko had a son, fashion designer Cem Hakko. He was laid to rest at the Ulus Sephardi Jewish Cemetery in Istanbul following the religious funeral ceremony held at the Neve Shalom Synagogue.
