= Rome attack =

Rome attack may refer to:

- 1973 Rome airport attacks and hijacking
- 1982 Great Synagogue of Rome attack
- 1985 Rome and Vienna airport attacks
