= List of cemeteries in Turkey =

This is list of cemeteries in Turkey sorted after provinces.

== Ankara ==
There are a total of 191 cemeteries within the metropolitan city limits of Ankara.

- Cebeci Asri Cemetery: The cemetery for high-ranked public and military officials in Ankara
- Turkish State Cemetery: Cemetery in Ankara reserved for presidents, prime ministers and high-ranked military officials fought at the Turkish War of Independence
- Karşıyaka Cemetery: Largest public cemetery in Ankara

== İstanbul ==
In Istanbul Province, there exist a total of 333 cemeteries, of which 268 are for Muslims and the remaining for non-Muslims like Christians of different denominations and Jews.

- Aşiyan Asri Cemetery: Burial ground at Bosporus, where mostly renowned intellectuals, writers and artists rest
- Edirnekapı Martyr's Cemetery: Military cemetery, where also high-ranked civil servants and renowned personalities are buried
- Haydarpaşa Cemetery: Cemetery for British soldiers, who died during the Crimean War and British Commonwealth soldiers of the two World Wars
- Eyüp Cemetery: one of the largest cemeteries of Istanbul hosting graves of Ottoman sultans and court members, grand viziers, high-ranked religious authorities, civil servants and commanders as well as intellectuals, scientists, artists and poets
- Feriköy Cemetery, Muslim cemetery
- Feriköy Protestant Cemetery, Istanbul: Christian cemetery in Istanbul dating back to 1858
- Karacaahmet Cemetery: 700-year-old cemetery in Üsküdar
- Merkezefendi Cemetery: 16th century burial ground in Zeytinburnu
- Pangaltı Catholic Cemetery, Istanbul: The largest Roman Catholic Cemetery in Istanbul
- Şişli Armenian Cemetery: Armenian cemetery in the Şişli district of Istanbul, Turkey
- Şişli Greek Orthodox Cemetery: Christian Orthodox cemetery, mostly consisting of Greek graves
- Zincirlikuyu Cemetery: Istanbul's first modern structured cemetery located in Şişli
- Ulus Ashkenazi Jewish Cemetery
- Ulus Sephardi Jewish Cemetery

== İzmir ==
The country's third biggest city has 267 cemeteries within the metropolitan city limits.

- Yeni Buca Cemetery
- Doğançay Cemetery
- Bornova Cemetery

== Mersin ==
- Mersin Interfaith Cemetery
