= Ulus Ashkenazi Jewish Cemetery =

- Interactive map of Ulus Ashkenazi Jewish Cemetery

Details
- Established: Beginning of the 1900s
- Location: Ulus, Beşiktaş, Istanbul
- Country: Turkey
- Coordinates: 41°04′13″N 29°01′46″E
- Type: Public
- Owned by: Neve Shalom Synagogue Foundation

The Ulus Ashkenazi Jewish Cemetery (Turkish: Ulus Aşkenazi Musevi Mezarlığı) is a burial ground of the Ashkenazi Jewish community in Istanbul, Turkey. However, it is also used today for Sephardi burials due to overpopulation of the nearby Ulus Sephardi Jewish Cemetery (Turkish: Ulus Sefarad Musevi Mezarlığı), which is about 500 m (1,600 ft) north of the Ashkenazi Jewish Cemetery on the same street.

It was established in the beginning of the 1900s during the Ottoman Empire era in Arnavutköy neighborhood of Beşiktaş district on the city's European side.

The cemetery is situated today in an area, which developed in the history from a countryside to an upscale neighborhood called Ulus. It was reported that due to the location of the cemetery in the city's one of the most expensive quarters, only wealthy people are interred in the ultra-luxury Ulus Cemetery while people, who can not afford the very high amount of donation requested for a resting place, are transferred to the cemetery in Kilyos, which lies around 40 km (25 mi) far away from the city center in northern part of Istanbul. The religious burial service is provided at site by the Neve Shalom Synagogue Foundation, which also carries out the maintenance of the cemetery.

Some other Jewish cemeteries in Istanbul are:

- Bağlarbaşı Jewish Cemetery (Bağlarbaşı Musevi Mezarlığı)
- Hasköy Karaite Jewish Cemetery (Hasköy Karaim Musevi Mezarlığı)
- Hasköy Sephardi Jews Cemetery (Hasköy Sefarad Musevi Mezarlığı)
- Judeo-Italiano Community Cemetery (İtalyan Musevi Cemaati Mezarlığı
- Kilyos Jewish Cemetery (Kilyos Musevi Mezarlığı)
- Kuzguncuk Nakkaştepe Jewish Cemetery (Kuzguncuk Nakkaştepe Musevi Mezarlığı)
- Ortaköy Jewish Cemetery (Ortaköy Musevi Mezarlığı)

== Notable burials ==
The 23 victims of the 1986 Neve Shalom Synagogue bombing and the six Turkish Jews out of 29 people, who were killed in the 15 November 2003 bombings of Neve Shalom and Bet Israel Synagogue in Istanbul, are interred here. There is also a monument in the cemetery memorizing the victims of both events.

- Hayati Kamhi, businessman and son of entrepreneur Jak Kamhi
- Bensiyon Pinto, honorary president of the Turkish Jewish Community

== See also ==
- List of cemeteries in Turkey
- History of the Jews in Turkey

== Book ==
- İstanbul Ulus Aşkenaz mezarlığı gömü listesi (in Turkish). Galata Ashkenazi Cultural Association. 2000. p. 46. – list of Burial at the Ulus Ashkenazi Cemetery
