= Cem Hakko =

Turkish fashion designer and businessman

- Born: June 17, 1955 (age 70); Istanbul, Turkey
- Occupation: Businessman
- Known for: President of Vakko

Cem Hakko (Istanbul, 17 June 1955) is a Turkish fashion designer and businessman. He is the son of Vitali Hakko (1913–2007).

== Life ==
After finishing elementary school in Turkey, he continued his studies at College du Leman in Geneva and graduated from high school in Strasbourg. Hakko studied at "Ecole Des Hautes Etudes Internationales / School of International Studies in Paris and Faculté de Sciences Economiques/ Faculty of Economics and Social Sciences of the University of Fribourg in Switzerland.

He wrote the book called "The Fashion Concept" as his thesis at the University of Fribourg. In the book, Hakko analyzed the emergence of fashion, its development phases and the social and economic factors which have created fashion from a scientific point of view. The book treats the psycho-social aspects of the fashion concept.

=== Vakko ===
Cem Hakko started to work with his father Vitali Hakko who created to the "Vakko" brand, during his summer vacations and returned to Istanbul at the beginning of the 80s.

Based on the product range of Vakko, Hakko established the young fashion brand Vakkorama in 1982. However, he did not consider Vakkorama just as a fashion brand; he created a lifestyle that integrates fashion, art, sports and music, thus achieving another first in Turkey. When Hakko took over the responsibility of Chairman of the Board of Directors in 2004, the Vakko Group had 24 stores as Vakko and Vakkorama. Cem Hakko added W Collection, V2K and Outlet brands to the existing brands thus increasing the number of Vakko Group brands to 4 while tripling the turnover.

Under the leadership of Hakko, all Vakko employees relocated to the Vakko Fashion Center which was built in Istanbul in 2010 by the famous architect Joshua Prince Ramus. The Vakko Fashion Center which has an area of 12 500 square meters, was awarded "The Best Work Area" by Wallpaper magazine in 2011, and was also awarded the "Arch Daily; The Building of the Year" with the votes of 30,000 architects.

=== Business associations ===
In addition to the responsibilities that he undertook in Vakko, Hakko has been actively working with 12 different associations such as TÜSİAD(Turkish Industry & Business Association), DEIK (Foreign Economic Relations Board), YPO-WPO, Professional Managers Association, Association of Radio and Television Broadcasters and finally as a member of the Board of Directors of TAYK (Turkish Offshore Racing Club). The current projects which are supported by Hakko - who places emphasis on carrying out social responsibility projects in Vakko - include the "Water Project", "Do not Drive Drunk, Take a Taxi".

=== Art and Fashion Library ===
The "Vitali Hakko Creative Industries Library" which was established by Hakko at Vakko Fashion Center has been serving artists, scholars, students and all art lovers with its 12.000 books in areas such as fashion, architecture, photography, painting etc. Vitali Hakko started an art collection in the 1960s and founded Turkey's first corporate art gallery in Ankara in 1978. Now, Cem Hakko is expanding this art collection and is preparing an exhibition which will consist of 900 works of more than forty artists and will be held at the exhibition hall to be opened at the Vakko Fashion Center.

=== Sports ===
Hakko, who grew up practicing sports since his childhood, professionally practicing sports such as ski, sailing, windsurfing, rally, kart racing, Formula 3, and the motocross sports. He was the winner of the Turkish Karting Championship in 1987 and 1988, the winner of the 1990 Istanbul Rally Championship and the winner of 1991 Turkey Rally Cross Championship. He ranked second at the 1988 International Karting Championship and the fourth at the 19th International Bursa Rally in 1994. Hakko who brought organizations such as Snowman, Class 1 World Offshore Championship and Turkey Sailing Race to Turkey is also the one who popularized sports such as the Formula 1 races in Turkey. Hakko is also one of three people who actualized the Formula 1 circuit and facilities in Istanbul.

=== Broadcasting ===
The music enthusiast Cem Hakko launched the Power Group starting with the establishment of national broadcaster Power FM radio in 1992. He included Power Records, Power Turk, Power Turk TV, Power Club, Power Garage TV, Power XL, Radyo Fenomen (Radio Phenomenon) respectively to Power Group.

=== Personal life ===
Hakko lives in Istanbul and has three children: Katia, Pia and Can. Katia Hakko studied at Parsons School of Design, Pia Hakko studied graphic design at Central St. Martins and both of them have returned to Turkey. Can Hakko still continues his education. Cem Hakko who has ongoing responsibilities as Chairman of Vakko and Power Holding, continues his efforts to prepare both the 3rd generation of the Hakko family and the Vakko Group for living lavishly and extravagantly.
