= İstinye Park =

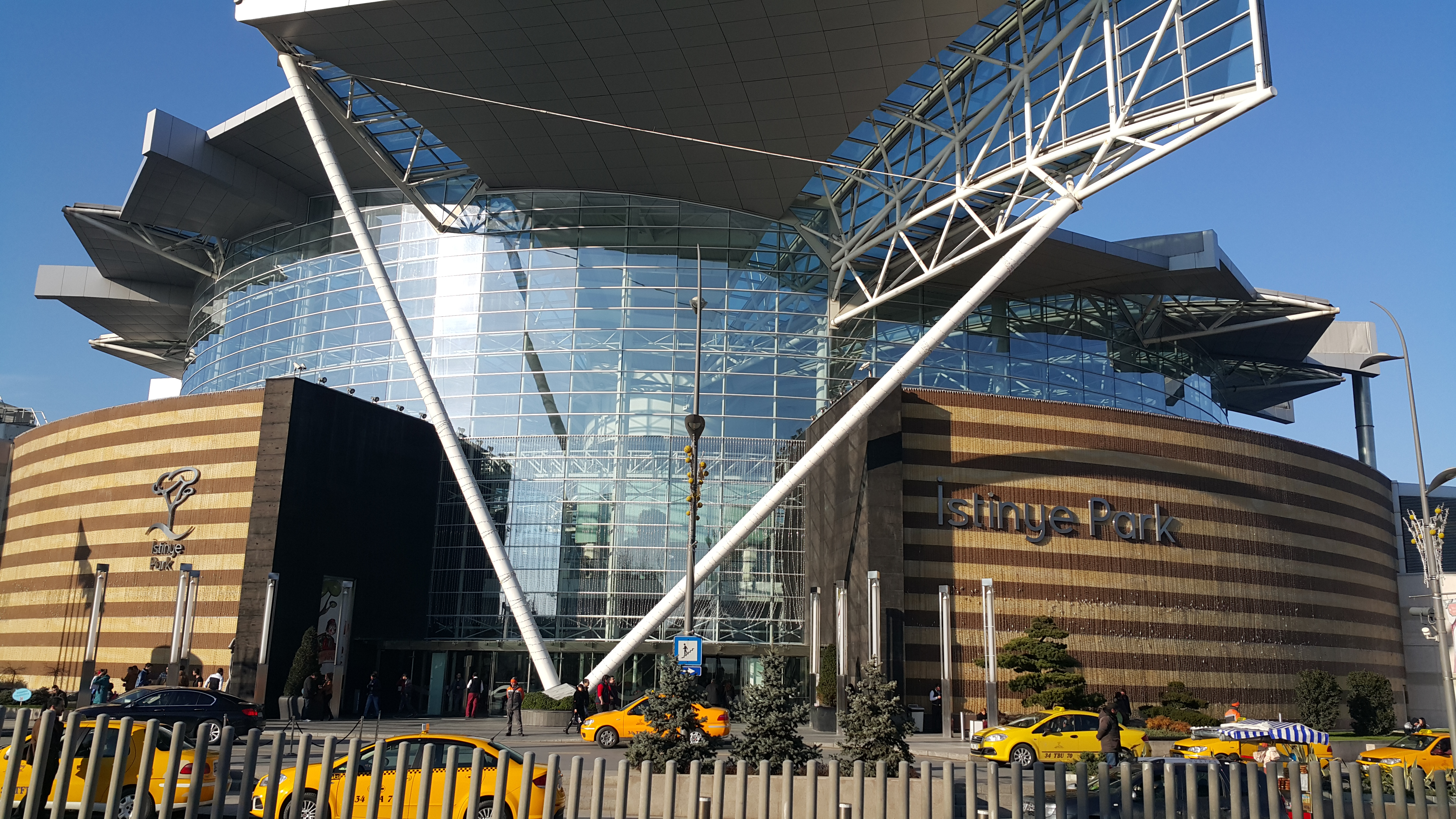
- Location: Istanbul, Turkey
- Coordinates: 41°06′37.58″N 29°01′58.51″E
- Opened: September 21, 2007; 19 years ago
- Developer: Orta Gayrımenkul Yatırım Yönetimi Turizm A.Ş.
- Owner: Orjin Group, Qatar Investment Authority
- Architect: Tom Kelley, Saad Irishad, Development Design Group, Inc.
- Num. of stores: 291
- Num. of anchor tenants: Armani; Beymen; Bottega Veneta; Boyner; Burberry; Calvin Klein; Cartier; Celine; Chanel; Christian Louboutin; Christofle; Cinemaximum; Dior; Dolce & Gabbana; Etro; Fendi; Gucci; H&M; Hermès; Hugo Boss; Lacoste; Loro Piana; Louis Vuitton; Marks & Spencer; Miu Miu; Paul & Shark; Prada; Tommy Hilfiger; Vakko; Zara; Zegna
- Floor area: 85,250 m^{2} (917,600 sq ft)
- Floors: 4 levels of underground parking (3200 spaces); 3 levels of shopping space
- Website: www.istinyepark.com
- Cinemaximum Movie Theatre (IMAX 3D screen)

İstinye Park is a shopping center in the İstinye quarter of Istanbul, Turkey with 291 stores, 85,250 m^{2} (917,600 sq ft) of retail area, and four levels of underground parking. The center features both enclosed and open-air sections. The open-air section has a green central park and offers street-side shopping.

The center includes an authentic Turkish food bazaar- a traditional market place, inspired by Turkish architecture and history.

== Design and layout ==
Istinye Park has a gross area of 242,000 m^{2} (2,600,000 sq ft).

There are three distinct sections present in the building:

- The Grand Rotunda is a central entertainment space, consisting of a four level arena-like space beneath a scalloped/segmented shell. It is supported by a central exterior mast over 3 panoramic elevators. The 75-meter-diameter hard-shell canopy encloses a 9 m diameter vertically moving stage. The Rotunda also features kinetic water sculptures animated with lights and music.
- The Lifestyle Center is an open-air town square incorporating a green central park and Fashion District – the glass-roofed indoor retail area.
- The Bazaar area is distinguished from the rest of the center with its historical Turkish styling- each facade has been inspired by Turkish architecture and history.

The US architect, BCT Design Group Inc., based in Baltimore, designed the project. The design period -from conceptual, and schematic, to development- lasted for about a year. Ömerler Mimarlik, based in Istanbul, drafted construction drawings and handled implementation. The construction took 26 months from the first lay of the foundation until the grand opening. From the first sketch to the completion of the project, it took (2004–2007) 3 years in total.

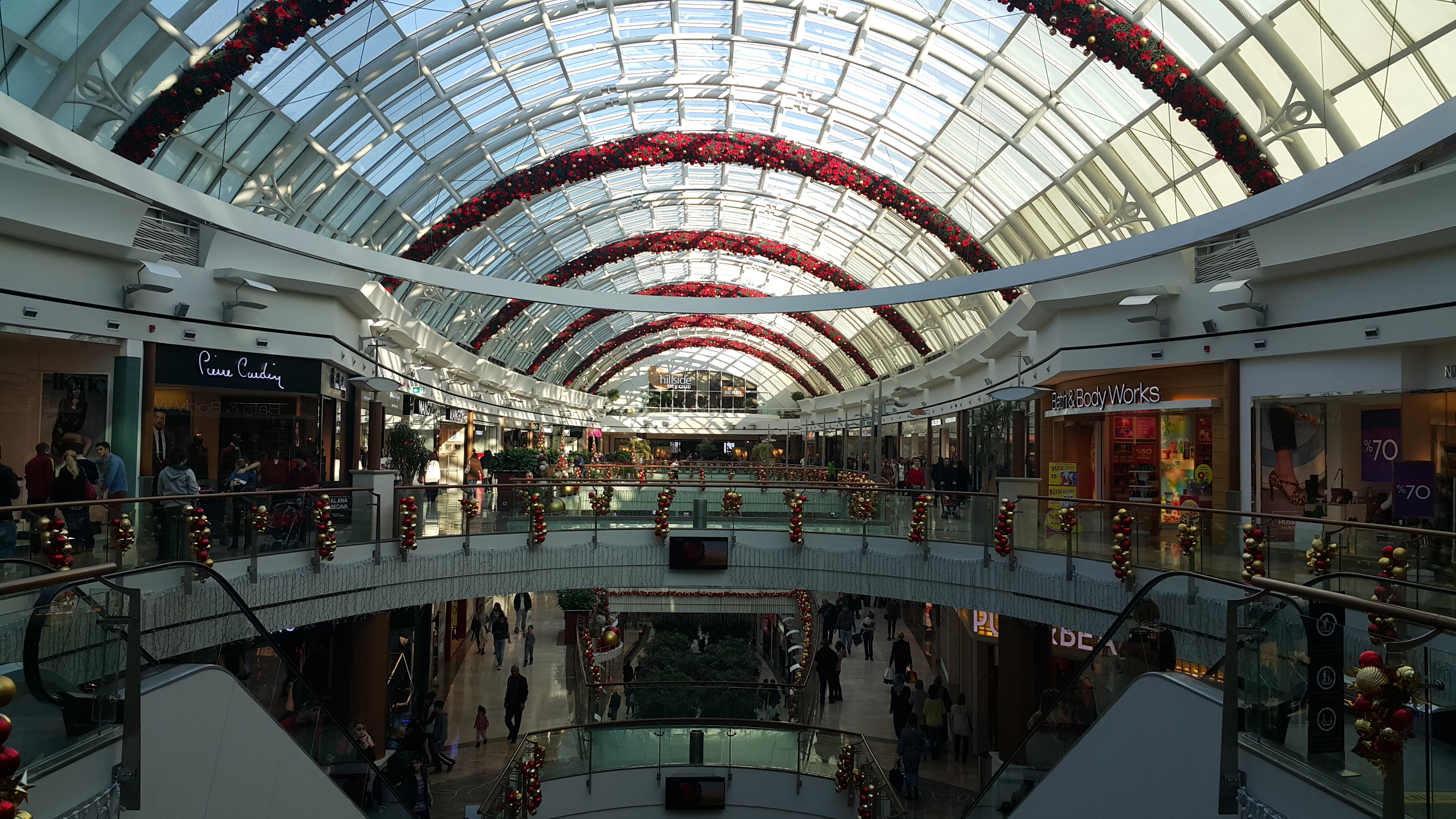
Interior of the shopping center

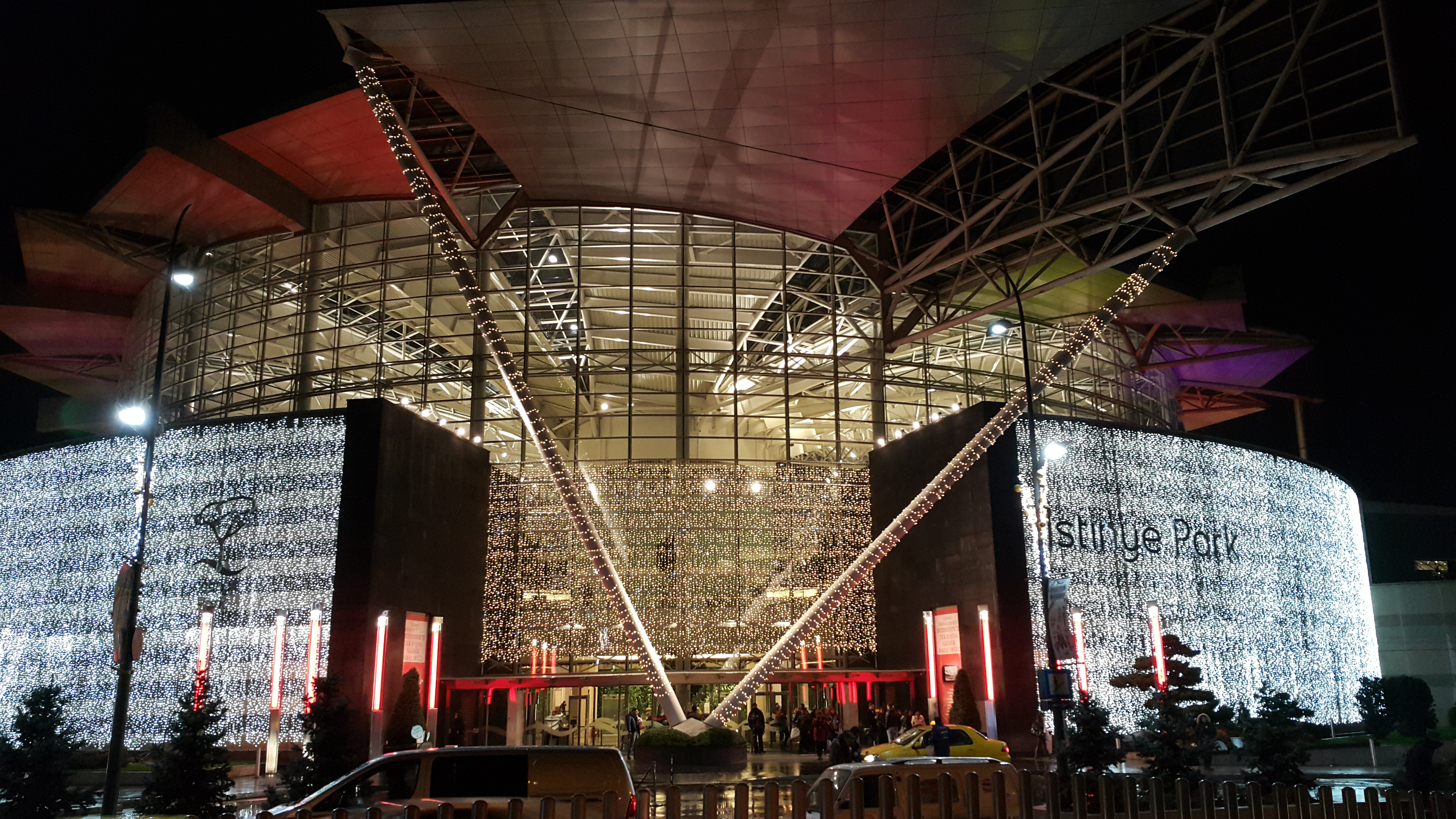
Entrance of the shopping center in Winter

== Transportation ==
City buses number 29, 29B, 29P, 29S, 40B, 42, EL1, EL2 provides access to the center, and the center is a short walk east of İ.T.Ü.—Ayazağa metro station.

== See also ==
- List of shopping malls in Istanbul
