= List of attacks attributed to Abu Nidal =

Abu Nidal (Sabri al-Banna) was regarded as the most dangerous of the Palestinian political leaders. Abu Nidal, whose pseudonym means "father of struggle" (Abu meaning father and Nidal, a secular term, meaning "struggle" or "effort" in Arabic) was primarily active in the 1970s and 1980s in the left wing of the Palestine Liberation Organization and later the secular/rejectionist front, and was accused by Western and Arab sources of acting as a mercenary for various Arab governments.

== List of attacks attributed to Abu Nidal ==
The following list has been compiled from a variety of sources. It is not complete and may contain errors. Some of these attacks have been claimed by several groups, some of them by no group, and others may have been falsely claimed by or attributed to Abu Nidal's organization. Especially noteworthy attacks have been marked in bold type.

See the references section for more details.

List of attacks attributed to Abu Nidal
1970s:	1970	1971	1972	1973	1974	1975	1976	1977	1978	1979
External links — References

== 1972 ==
- 5 September 1972: Abu Nidal is believed to have been involved in the planning of the Munich massacre at the 1972 Summer Olympics.

== 1973 ==
- 5 September 1973: Occupation of the Saudi embassy in Paris, in order to gain the release of Abu Daoud, then imprisoned in Jordan.
- 25 November 1973: KLM Flight 861 from Beirut to New York City and Tokyo hijacked over Iraqi airspace and diverted to Nicosia, Cyprus, then Valletta, Malta. Passengers and crew released. Claimed by the Arab Nationalist Youth Organization.

== 1974 ==
- 8 September 1974: Bombing of TWA Flight 841. All 79 passengers died.
- October 1974: Aborted assassination attempt on Yasser Arafat and Mahmoud Abbas. Following this he is sentenced to death in absentia by the PLO council. It is at this point that he founds the independent Abu Nidal Organisation.
- 22 November 1974: British Airways Vickers VC-10 flight from London to the Far East hijacked in Dubai and diverted to Tunis. One passenger was killed. The hijackers were allowed to fly to Libya.

== 1976 ==
- 27 September 1976: Attack and takeover of the Semiramis Hotel, Damascus, Syria. Three of the captured attackers were hanged in public the next day. The attack left five people dead, including the leader of the group and four hostages. Another 34 hostages were wounded after a seven-hour shootout.
- 11 October 1976: Attacks on the Syrian embassies in Islamabad and Rome, leaving one dead and two injured.
- 17 November 1976: ANO fighters stormed the Intercontinental Hotel in Amman, Jordan, taking several hostages. The hotel was stormed in turn by Jordanian security forces, and three gunmen, two soldiers and two civilians were killed. The remaining attackers were executed shortly afterwards.
- 1 December 1976: Syrian foreign minister Abdul Halim Khaddam was shot and wounded in an attack on his car in Damascus.
- 13 December 1976: Foiled attack on the Syrian embassy in Istanbul.

== 1977 ==
- October 1977: Second assassination attempt on Khaddam at Abu Dhabi Airport, during which the foreign minister of the United Arab Emirates Saif Ghobash was killed by accident.
- 15 November 1977: Assassination of the director of the Institut du Monde Arabe in Paris

== 1978 ==
- 4 January 1978: Assassination of Said Hammami, PLO representative in London, United Kingdom.
- 18 February 1978: Egyptian journalist Yusuf Sibai was killed whilst acting as president of the Conference of the Organization for the Solidarity with the Peoples of Africa, Asia and Latin America.
- 1978: Assassination of PLO representative in Brussels, Belgium.
- 15 June 1978: Assassination of Ali Yassin, PLO representative in Kuwait.
- 3 August 1978: Ezzedine Kalak, PLO representative to Paris, was assassinated along with an assistant.
- 5 August 1978: PLO offices in Islamabad were raided by ANO militants, leaving four dead and an unknown number of wounded.
- 1978: Assassination of PLO representative in Rome, Italy.
- 1978: Assassination of PLO representative in Madrid, Spain.

== 1979 ==
List of attacks attributed to Abu Nidal
1980s:	1980	1981	1982	1983	1984	1985	1986	1987	1988	1989
External links — References

== 1980 ==
- 17 January 1980: Yussouf Mubarak, director of the Palestinian library-shop, was assassinated in Paris, France.
- 19 January 1980: Hamdan al-Id, member of Fatah, was shot dead in Beirut.
- 3 March 1980: Adolfo Cotelo Villareal, lawyer and businessman, was killed by Said Ali Salman in Madrid after being mistakenly confused for Max Mazin, a businessman who was seen as a representative of capitalism and Zionism.
- April 1980: In Budapest, a grenade was thrown into a car in which Abu Daoud and Abu Iyad, two high-ranking members of Fatah (and the PLO), were sitting. Both of them survived. The assassination attempt is later traced to the Abu Nidal Organization.
- 27 July 1980: 1980 Antwerp summer camp attack. Carried out with two hand grenades by Abu Nidal operative Said Al Nasr on group of Jewish children waiting with their families for a summer camp bus in Antwerp, Belgium. A 15-year-old bystander was killed and eight others seriously injured.
- 27 July 1980: ANO claimed responsibility for the murder of an Israeli commercial attaché in Brussels.

== 1981 ==
- 6 February 1981: Hisham Muheissen, the Jordanian charge d'affairs in Beirut was kidnapped and three of his bodyguards killed by unidentified attackers, later believed to be ANO. Mulheissen was released unharmed 67 days later.
- 1 May 1981: Assassination of councilman Heinz Nittel in Vienna, Austria. Nittel was President of the Austrian-Israeli Friendship Association and had been involved in the peace process in Israel.
- 1 June 1981: Killing of Naim Khader, the PLO representative in Belgium.
- 1 August 1981: Fatah chief Abu Daoud was shot multiple times in the Victoria Intercontinental Hotel in Warsaw, Poland but survived. He later claimed the attempted assassination was carried out by a Palestinian double agent recruited by the Mossad. According to Polish sources, the suspected perpetrator was a person known as Daher Hussein. Samir Hassan Najmadeen, who was Abu Nidal's "accountant", was suspected of taking part in the operation.
- 1 August 1981: A series of bombings damaged several French banks and businesses, the Air France office and the Saudi embassy in Beirut, though nobody was seriously hurt.
- 29 August 1981: 1981 Vienna synagogue attack: Two men attacked a Vienna synagogue with machine guns. Two civilians were killed and 23 wounded, including three policemen. The attackers were arrested and imprisoned.
- 4 September 1981: The French ambassador to Lebanon, Louis Delamare, was assassinated in Beirut in a bungled kidnap attempt.
- 23 September 1981: Five Greek Cypriots were injured in a grenade attack on shipping offices in Limassol.
- 6 October 1981: PLO officer Majed Abu Sharar was assassinated by a bomb hidden in his hotel room in Rome, Italy. ANO claimed he was compromising the principles of the revolution.
- 7 November 1981: A kidnap attempt on a Saudi diplomat was foiled in Beirut.

== 1982 ==
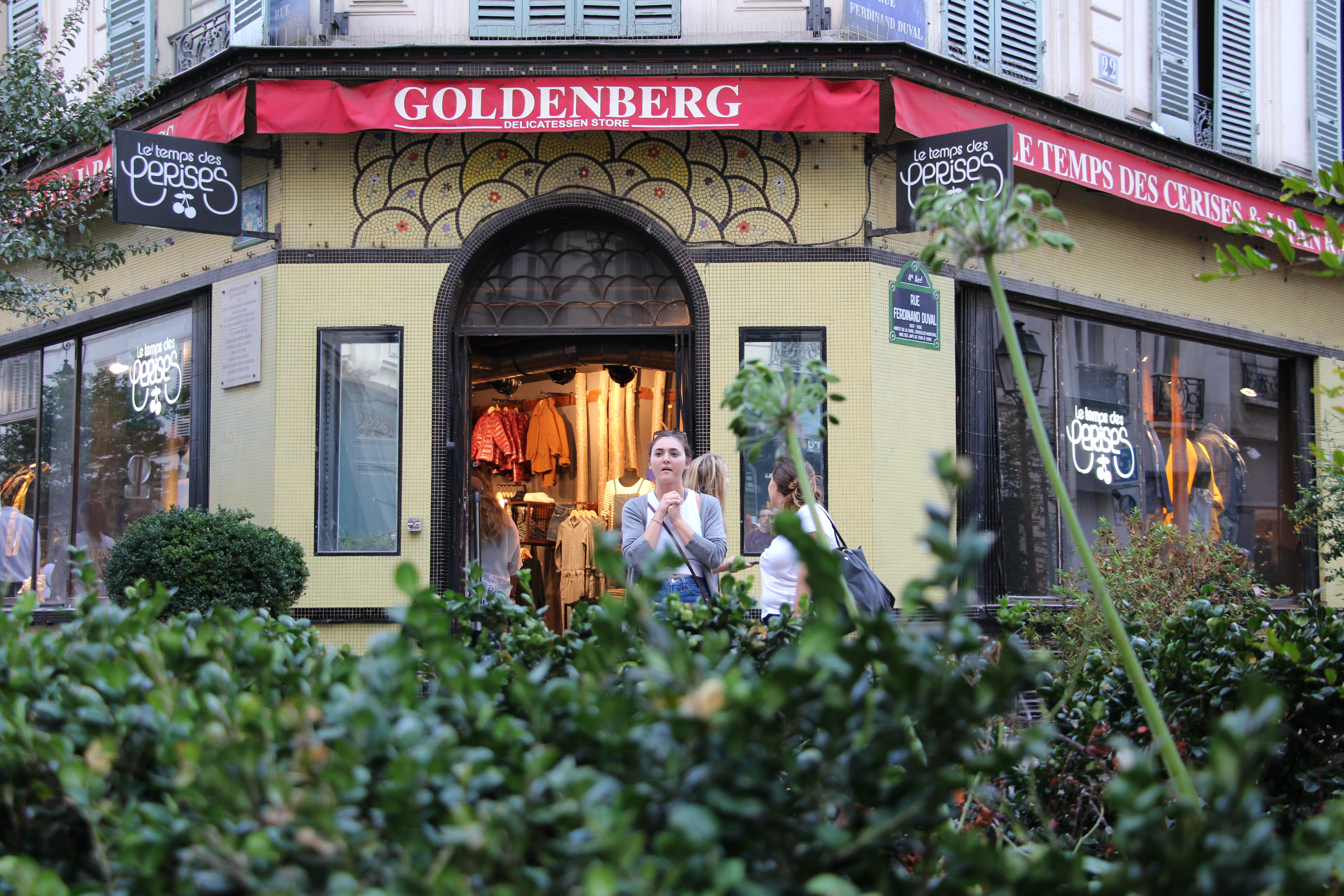
Art deco façade of an old store. The site was accommodating the former Jewish delicatessen "Chez Jo Goldenberg", where an attack occurred on August 9, 1982, carried out by Abu Nidal Organization.

- 3 June 1982: Attempted assassination in London of Shlomo Argov, Israeli ambassador to the United Kingdom. The Israeli government blamed the PLO for the attack, and this was one of the incidents which provoked a large-scale invasion of Lebanon on 6 June. Argov was permanently disabled and died of his injuries 21 years later.
- 4 June 1982: A Kuwaiti diplomat was assassinated outside his home in New Delhi, India.
- 7 July 1982: A Jordanian diplomat was assassinated and another seriously injured during an attack in Athens.
- 9 August 1982: During an attack on Goldenberg Restaurant in the Jewish quarter of Paris, six people are killed and 22 wounded.
- 26 August 1982: Two failed assassination attempts – on the United Arab Emirates consul in Bombay and a Kuwaiti diplomat in Karachi, Pakistan.
- 1982: Assassination of PLO official in Madrid, Spain.
- 16 September 1982: Kuwaiti diplomat Najeed Sayed al-Rafaia was assassinated in Madrid, when he was mistaken for the ambassador.
- 18 September 1982: Four people were wounded when the Great Synagogue of Brussels is attacked in a "shoot and run" incident.
- 9 October 1982: 1982 Great Synagogue of Rome attack: five elegantly dressed attackers threw at least three hand grenades and sprayed a crowd of people with submachine fire, as they were leaving the central synagogue in Rome, Italy. A 2-year-old toddler (Stefano Gaj Taché) was killed in the attack, and 37 people were injured.

== 1983 ==
- 10 April 1983: Noted PLO dove and Arafat aide Issam Sartawi was killed at the Socialist International conference in Albufeira, Portugal.
- 1983: Attack on the Jordanian ambassador to Italy. The victim survived.
- 29 August 1983: A French aircraft was hijacked from Vienna, Austria and taken to Tehran. No one was hurt in the incident.
- 23 September 1983: Bombing of Gulf Air Flight 771. 117 people killed.
- 26 October 1983: Jordanian ambassador to India was shot six times in an ambush in New Delhi, but survived his injuries.
- 27 October 1983: Jordanian ambassador to Italy, Taysir AlaEddin Toukan, was shot and wounded along with his driver during an ambush by two gunmen in Rome. Both men survived.
- 7 November 1983: Attack on the Jordanian embassy in Athens, Greece. A guard was killed.
- 9 November 1983: An improvised device blast in the As-Salt Street in Amman, Jordan.
- 26 December 1983: Two people were injured by a bomb explosion outside a Marks and Spencer department store in London, England. The Provisional Irish Republican Army was blamed, but it later emerged that the ANO was responsible.
- December 1983: ANO was accused of responsibility for the bombing of the French Cultural Center in İzmir, Turkey.
- 29 December 1983: The Jordanian ambassador to Spain was assassinated in Madrid.

== 1984 ==
- 1984: Assassination of Jordanian ambassador in India.
- 1984: Assassination of Jordanian ambassador in Spain.
- 1984: Assassination of Jordanian ambassador in Italy.
- 8 February 1984: The United Arab Emirates' ambassador to France, Khalifa Ahmad Mubarak, was assassinated on a Paris street.
- 7 March 1984: Three were killed and nine injured in the bombing of a civilian bus in Ashdod, Israel.
- 24 March 1984: In Amman, a bomb was found and removed at the Intercontinental Hotel, coinciding with the visit of Queen Elizabeth II to Jordan.
- 28 March 1984: British Cultural Attache and British Council representative Kenneth Whitty was assassinated in Athens by a single gunman, coinciding with the start of a European tour of A School For Scandal, to celebrate the British Council's 50th anniversary, which opened in Athens three days later on 31 March.
- 2 April 1984: 48 people were wounded by a machine gun attack on a crowded shopping mall in Jerusalem, Israel.
- 14 May 1984: A bomb blast in Attica, Greece, left more than 53 people injured.
- **24 May 1984**; Bomb exploded in Athens restaurant, no one is hurt.
- 5 June 1984: Assassination attempt on Israeli diplomat in Cairo, Egypt.
- 4 October 1984: A car bomb exploded in the Israeli embassy car park in Nicosia, Cyprus. One person was hurt
- 4 October 1984: An Israeli intelligence agent was killed with four other people in an ambush on a Beirut street.
- 26 October 1984: The attempted assassination of a senior UAE diplomat in Rome, Italy, left him in a coma. A female bystander was killed.
- 28 November 1984: Percy Norris, British Deputy High Commissioner in Bombay, was shot dead by an unidentified gunman as he drove through traffic.
- 29 November 1984: British Airways' offices in Beirut, Lebanon, were bombed.
- November 1984: Attempted assassination of Jordanian diplomat in Greece.
- 4 December 1984: ANO killed a Jordanian diplomat in Bucharest, Romania, using the name of Black September.
- 26 December 1984: Bombing of the home of veteran Fatah and PLO leader Hani al-Hassan (a.k.a. Abu Tariq, Abu al-Hassan), in Amman, Jordan. ANO used the name Black September.
- 29 December 1984: Assassination in Amman of former Hebron mayor and West Bank moderate Fahd Qawasma, who had previously been deported by Israel for alleged incitement to violence. ANO used the name of Black September.

== 1985 ==
- 25 March 1985: British journalist Alec Collett, working for the UN, was kidnapped in Beirut, Lebanon along with an Austrian who was soon released. On 23 April 1986, he was hanged in revenge for Operation El Dorado Canyon.
- 1985: Attack on resort hotel in Athens, Greece. 13 wounded.
- 21 March 1985: Bombing of the Royal Jordanian Airlines (ALIA) offices in Rome, Italy, under the name Black September.
- 21 March 1985: Bombing of the Royal Jordanian Airlines (ALIA) offices in Athens, Greece, under the name Black September.
- 21 March 1985: Bombing of the Royal Jordanian Airlines (ALIA) offices in Nicosia, Cyprus, under the name Black September.
- 3 April 1985: Rocket attack on ALIA airliner taking off from Athens Airport. No casualties.
- 4 April 1985: Rocket attack against Jordanian embassy in Italy.
- 1 May 1985: An assassination attempt on a Kuwaiti newspaper editor Ahmed Al-Jarallah.
- 19 June 1985: The Frankfurt Airport was bombed in an attack that killed 3 people, including two children, and wounded 74.
- 1 July 1985: Bombing of the British Airways office in Madrid, Spain. One person was killed, 27 wounded. Near simultaneous attack on ALIA offices nearby, with two wounded.
- 7 July 1985: A yacht carrying French and Belgian Jews was hijacked off the Gaza Strip and sailed to Libya with eight civilian hostages. These people are then used as "bargaining chips" in Libyan dealings with France, and Abu Nidal dealing with Belgium, until they are all released in 1990. Abu Nidal takes responsibility for this act in November 1987 (Silco incident).
- 11 July 1985: Eleven people were killed and 90 injured in two large bomb explosions in cafés in Kuwait City. Amongst the dead was the target of the bombings, the head of Kuwait's investigative branch of the police. A third bomb was successfully defused.
- 21 July 1985: A Kuwait Airlines office was destroyed in Beirut. No one was hurt.
- 22 July 1985: Failed bombing of the US embassy in Egypt.
- 24 July 1985: Jordanian diplomat Zayed Sati was assassinated in Istanbul, Turkey.
- 16 September 1985: Grenades were thrown into a popular tourist attraction, the Cafe de Paris in Rome, Italy, wounding 38 people.
- November 1985: Hijacking of EgyptAir Flight 648 at Malta. Resolved after Egyptian commandos stormed the plane, slaying 1 of the 3 hijackers, one of which had been killed in an in-flight shootout with a sky marshal, although 58 of the 91 passengers died.
- 7 October 1985: Eleven people were injured by a bomb which exploded in a residential building in Jerusalem.
- 20 November 1985: Two Palestinians were assassinated in Jordan by ANO because they were apparently associated with Yasser Arafat.
- 19 December 1985: A courtroom in Nantes, France was held hostage by a gunman for several hours in a symbolic protest. No one was hurt.
- 27 December 1985: Attacks on Israeli El Al airport counters in Rome and Vienna. 18 dead, 111 wounded.

== 1986 ==
- 28 March 1986: Two professors working in Beirut, Leigh Douglas, British and Philip Padfield, American, were kidnapped by ANO operatives. Both were executed on 17 April in a reprisal for Operation El Dorado Canyon.
- 2 April 1986: Four people were killed in the bombing of TWA Flight 840 over Corfu.
- 17 April 1986: British journalist John McCarthy was kidnapped in Beirut in response to Operation El Dorado Canyon. He was released in 1991.
- 27 April 1986: British tourist Paul Appelby was abducted and murdered in Jerusalem.
- 27 May 1986: One person was killed and five injured in six bomb attacks on Saudi Airlines and Pan Am offices in Karachi, Pakistan.
- 21 June 1986: A rocket attack on the Iraqi embassy in Vienna, Austria was foiled.
- 5 September 1986: 19 people killed during the hijacking of Pan Am Flight 73 in Karachi.
- 6 September 1986: Gunmen stormed the Neve Shalom synagogue in Istanbul, Turkey during the Sabbath. They shot 22 people dead and set fire to the building before being killed in the (possibly deliberate) detonation of a grenade.
- 11 September 1986: Syrian executive of the International Lions Club, Victor Kano, was kidnapped in Beirut, but later released unharmed.
- 5 November 1986: Rockets hit the Romanian embassies in Bahrain and Lebanon in protest at the Romanian support for the peace process. No one was hurt.

== 1987 ==
- 19 January 1987: Two Israeli youths were non-fatally stabbed in Jerusalem, apparently after stumbling upon some ANO operatives by accident.
- 5 March 1987: Two Palestinian men were abducted and hanged in Turkey on unproven "charges" of being Jordanian secret agents.

== 1988 ==
- 1988: Car bomb outside the Israeli embassy in Cyprus. Three dead.
- **5 February 1988** Two Scandinavian aid workers were kidnapped in Beirut and released a month later.
- 23 March 1988: A man fired on a bus in Bombay, India, which was carrying an Alitalia flight crew. One person wounded. Two days later, grenades were discovered and removed from the Saudi Arabian consulate in the city.
- 15 May 1988: Simultaneous gun and grenade attacks on the Acropole Hotel and the Sudan Club in Khartoum aimed at Western diplomats and their families. Four Britons, three Americans and two Sudanese killed, 21 people wounded.
- 11 May 1988: A large truck bomb explodes close to the Israeli embassy in Nicosia, Cyprus. The driver is one of the three people killed, apparently when an accomplice remotely detonated the device early. 19 people were injured.
- 11 July 1988: A car bomb explodes prematurely at a pier in Athens, killing two ANO members. This is followed by an attack on the cruise ship City of Poros, which leaves nine dead and 98 wounded.
- 20 August 1988: 25 people are injured in a hand grenade explosion at a shopping centre in Haifa, Israel.
- 17 November 1988: A Swiss Red Cross worker was kidnapped in Sidon, Lebanon, and held for a month before being released unharmed.

== 1989 ==
- 4 January 1989: A Saudi diplomat, Salah Al-Maliki, was killed and another man injured near the embassy in Bangkok, Thailand.
- 29 March 1989: Two Muslim clerics opposed to the Salman Rushdie fatwah were assassinated in a mosque in Brussels, Belgium.
- 4 October 1989: Dr Joseph Wybran, a Belgian Jew and peace activist, was assassinated in Brussels.
- 6 October 1989: Two Swiss Red Cross workers were kidnapped in Sidon, Lebanon. Both were released unharmed in August 1990.

List of attacks attributed to Abu Nidal
1990s:	1990	1991	1992	1993	1994	1995	1996	1997
External links — References

== 1990 ==
- 25 July 1990: A prominent member of the Israeli community in Lima, Peru was seriously wounded in an assassination attempt.
- 12 October 1990: The Parliamentary Speaker Rifaat Mahjoub was shot and killed, along four civilians in Cairo. Egyptian and Iraqi backed ANO forces believed responsible. In August 1993, 24 fundamentalist, among whom were the alleged perpetrators of the murder of Rifaat Mahjoub.

== 1991 ==
- 14 January 1991: Assassination in Tunis of Abu Iyad, a top-ranking Fatah leader, who was Arafat's closest aide and the PLO's second-in-command. Also killed is the PLO Western (Israel) sector commander Hayel Abdul Hamid and operations head Fakhri Al Omari.
- 29 October 1991: Suspected ANO militants attack with rockets the US embassy in Beirut. The attack only caused material damages.

== 1992 ==
- 8 June 1992: PLO officer Atef Bseiso was assassinated in Paris. An anonymous caller claiming to represent the ANO claimed credit, but the PLO and French intelligence services accused Mossad.
- 30 June 1992: Four PLO fighters were assassinated in a co-ordinated ambush in Sidon, Lebanon. One of the dead was Anwar Madi, PLO commander in Southern Lebanon. The ANO kept attacked PLO positions in Lebanon.
- 17 October 1992: Mohammad Houedi a local commander of the PLO were shot dead in Tyre, Lebanon, by suspect ANO militants Three days later the lieutenant of the PLO Mohammed al-Attal was killed.

== 1993 ==
- 15 November 1993: A PLO official was assassinated in Sidon, Lebanon.

== 1994 ==
- 29 January 1994: Assassination of Naeb Imran Maaytah, Jordanian diplomat, on a Beirut street. Jordanian authorities hinted that the ANO conducted this attack on behalf of Libya.

== 1997 ==
- 1997: Killing of two ANO/Fatah-RC members in Lebanon over accusations of embezzlement.
- 1997: Accused of assassinating Egyptian Islamist Sheikh Moutaleb in Yemen.

== 1998 ==
- 5 October 1998: A member of the ANO attacked a synagogue in Baghdad with an improvised device, killing ten Iraqi Jews.
