= Ishak Haleva =

Turkish rabbi (1940–2025)

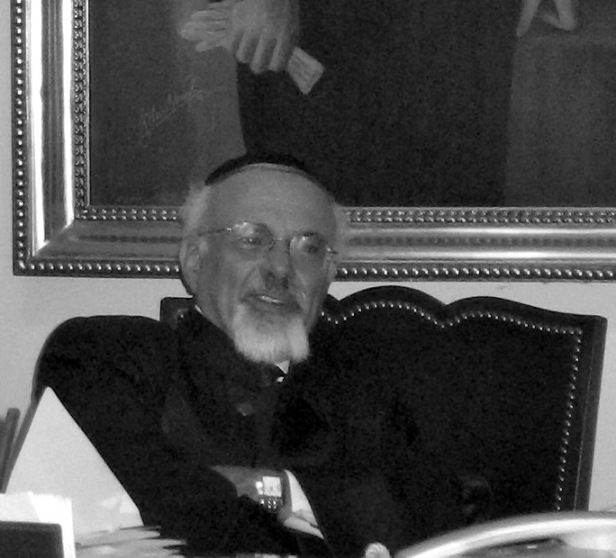
Chief Rabbi Ishak Haleva

Ishak Haleva (Hebrew: יצחק חליבה, Turkish: İsak Haleva) (27 April 1940 – 14 January 2025) was Hakham Bashi (Chief Rabbi) (Turkish: Hahambaşı) of Turkey.

== Biography ==
Haleva was born in Istanbul, Turkey in 1940. Before becoming the Chief Rabbi, he studied at Yeshiva Porat Yosef in Jerusalem. Haleva was the deputy to David Asseo for seven years and became the new chief rabbi after Asseo died in 2002. He was a member of the Presidium Council of the Alliance of Rabbis in Islamic States.

Haleva died in Istanbul in January 2025, at the age of 84.

== See also ==
- History of the Jews in Turkey
- Jewish Museum of Turkey
- Turkey-Israel relations
- List of synagogues in Turkey
