= Vakko =

Turkish fashion brand

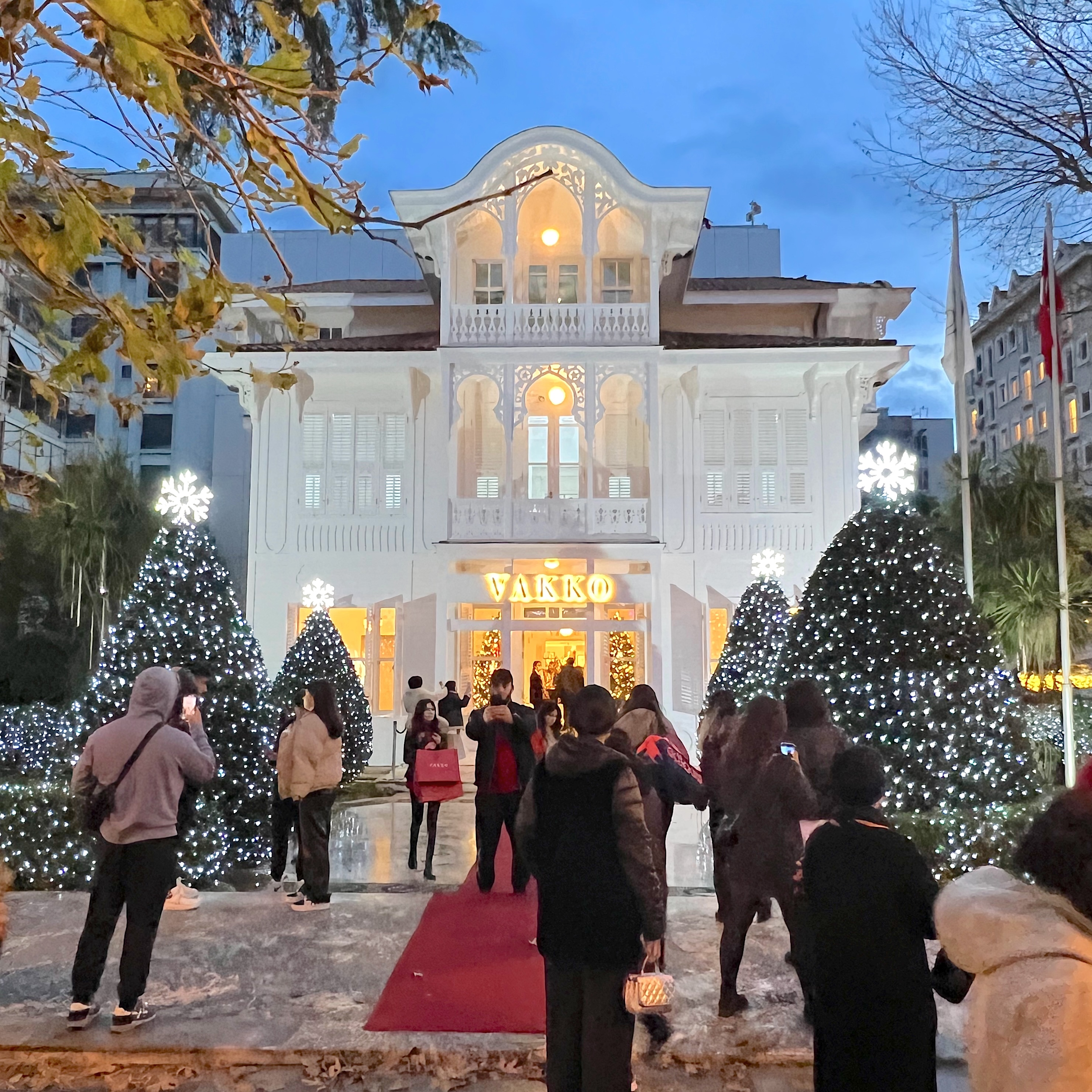
- Vakko department store in December 2022
- Industry: Fashion
- Founded: 1934; 92 years ago
- Founder: Vitali Hakko
- Headquarters: Istanbul, Turkey
- Key people: Cem Hakko (President); Jaklin Guner (CEO)
- Products: Luxury goods
- Revenue: ▲$424 million (2023)
- Website: vakko.com

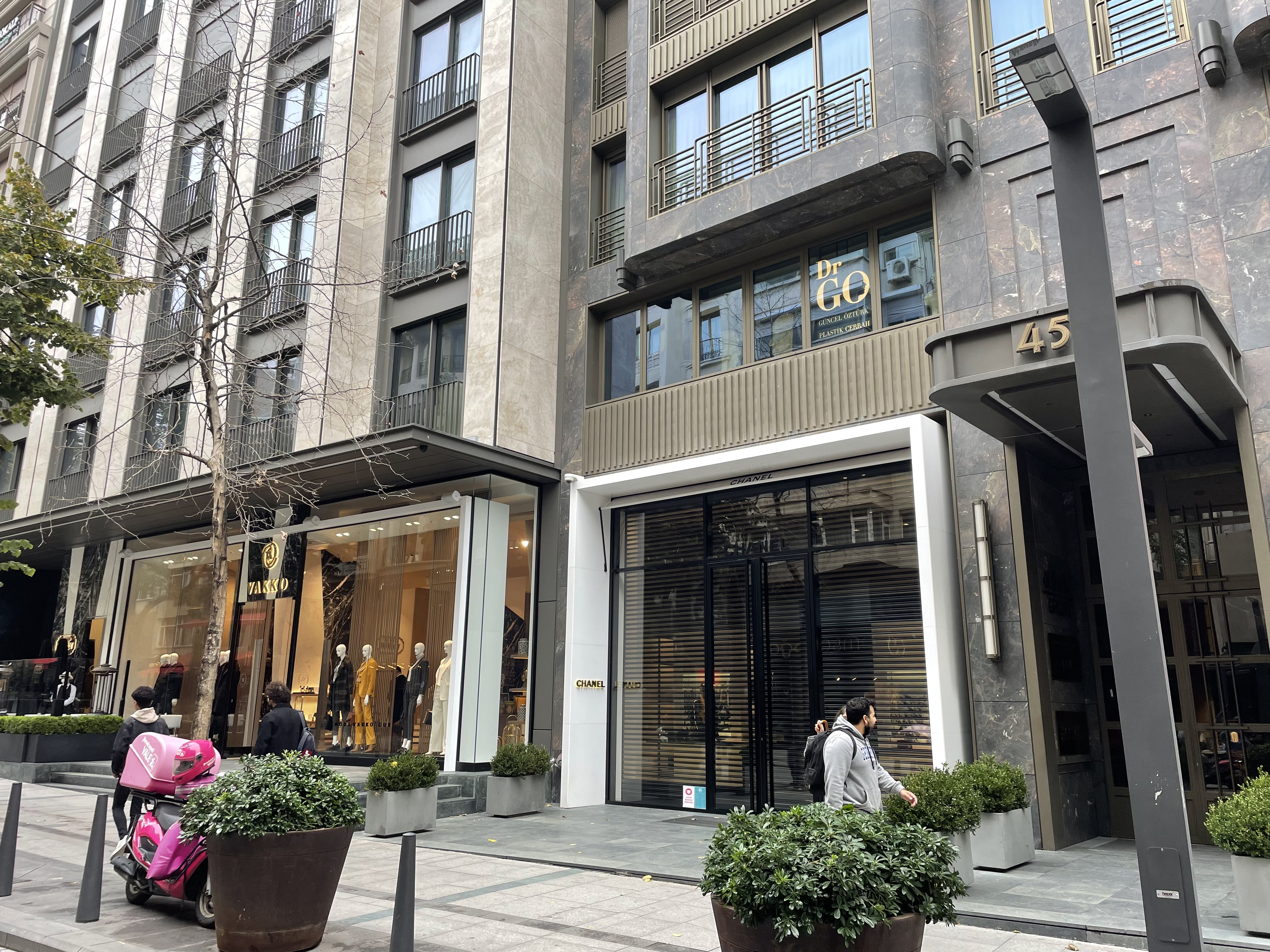
Vakko Nişantaşı in Harbiye, Şişli, Istanbul Central Business District

Vakko is a Turkish luxury fashion company founded by Vitali Hakko (d. 2007) survived by his son Cem Hakko. It produces and retails textiles, leather goods, and accessories.

Vakko also operates luxury department stores under the Vakko name at Zorlu Center, İstinye Park, Akmerkez, Vadi Istanbul, and Akasya malls and on Bağdat Caddesi in Suadiye (Asian side); in Ankara at Atakule and Armada malls, and in İzmir at Hilltown and Istinye Park İzmir malls. It also operates boutiques under the Vakkorama, Vakko Couture, Vakko Wedding, Vakko L'Atelier, and Vakko Home names, as well as Vakko Outlet locations.

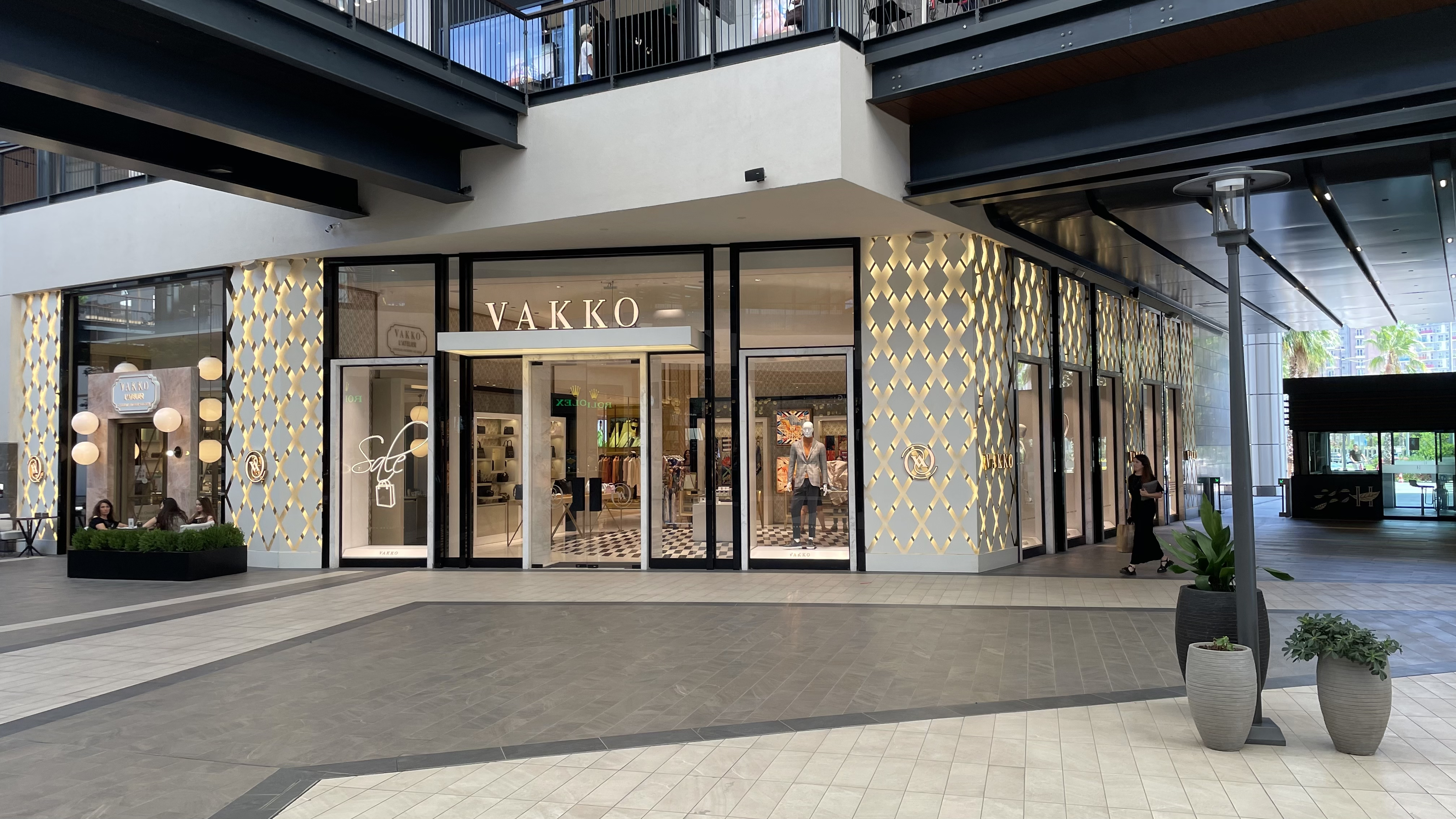
Vakko Hilltown İzmir mall in Yalı, Karşıyaka, İzmir

In 1962, Vakko's eight-story flagship store on İstiklal Avenue in Beyoğlu was the first modern department store in Turkey. It operated until 2006, when it became a branch of Mango.

== History ==
Vakko was founded in 1934 by Vitali Hakko under the brand name Şen Şapka (Turkish: The Happy Hat) as a small hat seller in Sultanhamam. In 1937, with his older brother Albert Hakko becoming a partner, Vitali Hakko changed the name of the company to Vakko and established Turkey's first silk dyeing workshop in Kurtuluş, Şişli. After Şen Şapka transformed into Vakko, it started to produce scarves with Turkish silk, cotton and wool. Over time, Vakko turned to ready-to-wear to produce more than hats, scarves, and printed fabrics. Here, customers were introduced for the first time to modern store practices such as bargain-free and promotional sales, and replacement of sold goods.

In 1962, Hakko opened a large 8-storey store, including a cafe and fashion gallery, in Beyoğlu (a.k.a. Pera), at the time, the most important modern shopping districts in Istanbul. In 1969, the first Vakko Factory was built in Merter measuring 40,000 m^{2} and employment was provided. In 1973, the second Vakko store opened in Ankara, and Vakko began to further expand its retail network with the Vakko Boutique sales points it opened one after the other. Six years later, in 1979, the third Vakko store opened in İzmir. There was an increase in the popularity of the Vakko brand with advertising campaigns and fashion shows carried out throughout Turkey.

In September 1979 Vakko opened up its first shop outside Turkey, in Old Bond Street, London, selling merchandise 90% Vakko-produced, including items by Sevim Cavdar, and launched by a rooftop fashion show at the Régine Club.

In 1981, on the 100th birthday of Mustafa Kemal Atatürk, a fashion and art show called "Anatolian Sun" was organized, bringing together Anatolian cultures and Western fashion concepts. The show, which was also exhibited outside Turkey, specifically in Rome, Vienna, Brussels, Paris, and London, introduced Vakko in Europe as the representative of contemporary Turkish fashion.

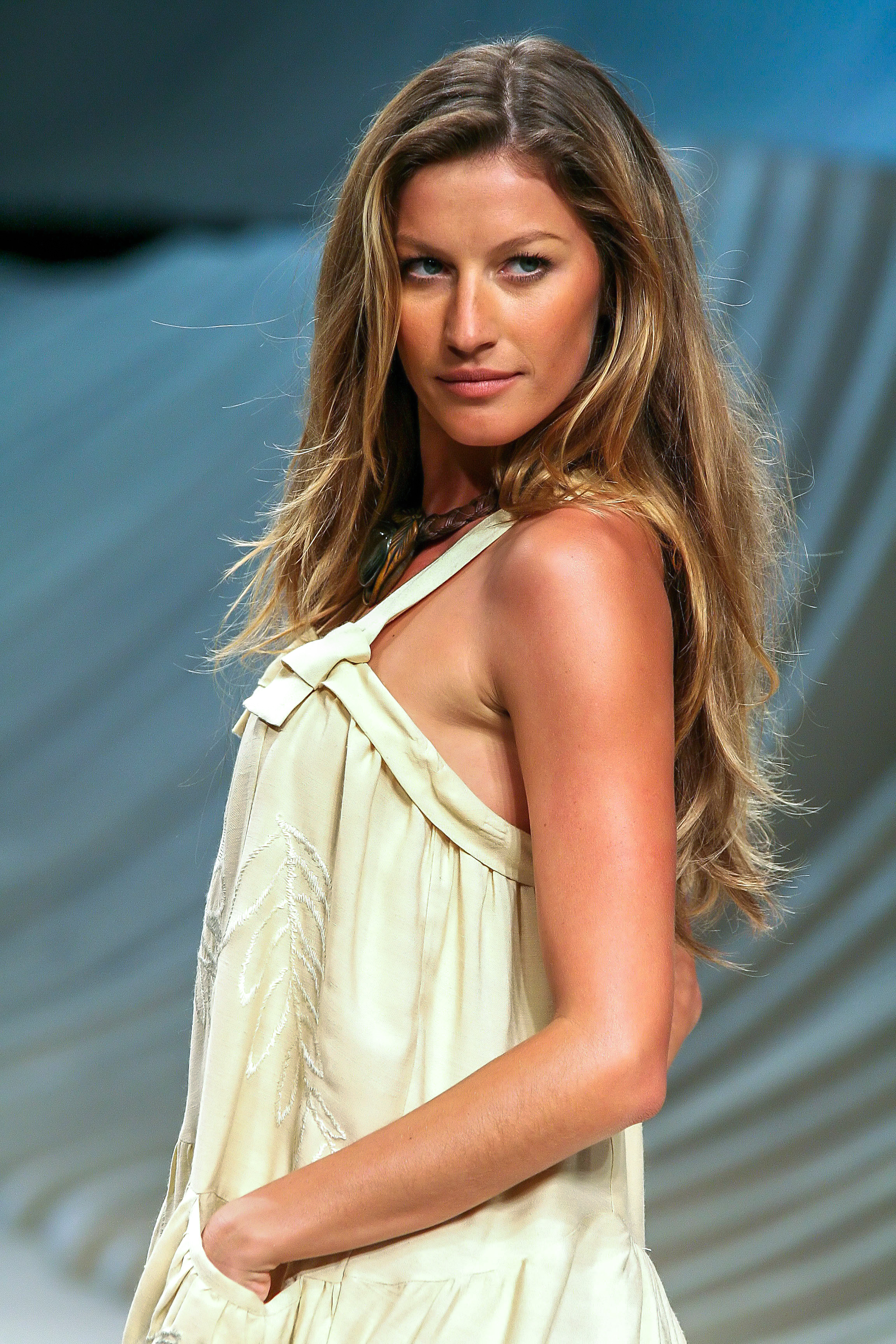
"The Face of Vakko", Gisele Bündchen

In 1982, Vakkorama, one of Turkey's first youth stores, opened in Taksim, Istanbul. In order to bring New York fashion to Istanbul, Vakkorama introduced a new team called V2K Designers ('V2K Designers') in 2000 with the slogan "Two cities, one brand". Over time, V2K Designers has acquired designers and brands from other fashion cities such as Paris, London and Milan, as well as New York. Today, it is Turkey's first concept store where different world brands meet under the same roof. Creations of other designers and brands such as Rick Owens, Gareth Pugh, Alexander Wang, Hussein Chalayan, Preen, Erdem, Elizabeth & James, Band of Outsider, and Rag & Bone are available at V2K Designers.

In 2006, Vakko opened in the then-new Kanyon Shopping Mall in Levent, in Istanbul's modern Central Business District (the store has since closed and opened in the newer, larger Zorlu Center nearby). At the same time, the famous fashion designer Zac Posen's specially interpreted creations for Vakko were introduced under the label "Zac Posen @Vakko". In the same year, world-famous top model Gisele Bündchen became the face of Vakko's campaign. Since 2008, Vakko has been continuing its operations in its new factory, which is headquartered in Merter and spread over an area 2 times the size of its old factory, with screen printing and ready-made clothing production units, logistics facilities, social use areas, and work offices.

In 2009, Vakko Home, launched, offering a selection of home furnishings and accessories, domestics (bed linens and towels), etc.

In 2010, Vakko Fashion Center, designed by New York-based REX and shared with media company Power Media, was opened in Nakkaştepe, Üsküdar (Asia), consisting of all management units and creative staff offices, as well as showrooms, the Vitali Hakko Creative Industries Library, auditorium, gallery and museum. In the same year, Vakko Wedding House Akaretler, which brings together evening dresses, tuxedos, accessories, underwear and hats suitable for all kinds of ceremonies for the bride and groom's families, opened in a single store. The first culture and arts festival, Istancool, which brought together many famous artists from different disciplines, was held in 2010. Many important names from the fashion and art worlds were hosted as guests, including the famous style icon Daphne Guinness, hat designer Philip Treacy, and pianist Michael Nyman. In 2011, Vakko Fashion Center was chosen as the "Best Workspace of the Year" by Wallpaper magazine and the international architecture platform ArchDaily.

Also in 2011, milliner (hat designer) Stephen Jones ' The Accent of Fashion Exhibition was held at Vakko Fashion Center.

In the 2010s, Vakko continued to branch out in diverse related businesses:

- In 2011, the Vitali Hakko Creative Industries Library opened, focusing on fashion, architecture, painting, design, cinema and music-related publications
- In 2013, the Vakko Esmod Fashion School launched in collaboration with the École supérieure des arts et techniques de la mode (ESMOD) of Paris, established in 1841
- In 2016, Vakko opened the first Vakko Patisserie branch, and introduces a new brand for all of its diverse food and beverage services, Vakko L'Atelier

Istancool2012 hosted important names from the fashion and art world, such as French Vogue editor Carine Roitfeld, famous photographer Mario Sorrenti and artist Pınar Yolaçan.

Also in 2012, Hartford and Riviera Maison brands were incorporated into Vakko Holding.

== Retail store formats ==
As of 31 December 2023 there were 181 points of sale: 29 in the department store division, 44 Vakko Boutique, 27 Vakkorama, 51 W Collection, 15 Vakko Outlet, 10 Vakko Wedding and 5 Vakko Home stores.

As of June 2024, Vakko lists the following retail divisions and formats:

Division/ format	Geographical presence		Remarks
Division/ format	Istanbul	Other	Remarks
Vakko department store division
Full-line; Vakko department stores	Akasya mall, Acıbadem, Üsküdar (2014–); Akmerkez mall, Nispetiye, Beşiktaş (1993–); Aqua Florya mall, Yeşilköy, Bakırköy; Emaar Square mall, Ünalan, Üsküdar; İstinye Park mall, Maslak, Sarıyer; Nişantaşı store: Abdi İpekçi St., Harbiye, Şişli; Suadiye: Bağdat Ave., Kadıköy (1997–); Vadistanbul mall, Ayazağa, Sarıyer; Zorlu Center, Levazım, Beşiktaş (2013–); Former: İstiklal Avenue (1962–2006), 5,000 m^{2} (54,000 sq ft), 5 stories, became a Mango); Kanyon mall, Esentepe, Şişli: Vakko dept. store and V2K (2006–2020)	Ankara: Atakule mall, Çankaya, Çankaya; Armada mall, Beştepe, Yenimahalle; Former: Kızılay, Çankaya (1973–2002); İzmir: Hilltown İzmir mall, Yalı, Karşıyaka; İstinye Park İzmir mall, Bahçelerarası, Balçova; Former: Alsancak, Konak (1979–?); Elsewhere: Adana, 01 Burda mall; Antalya (2): Vakko and Vakko Cadde both in Şirinyali, Muratpaşa; Bodrum, Mandarin Oriental Hotel; Bursa	
Vakko; Christofle	İstinye Park	Ankara, Atakule mall	
Vakko; Couture	İstinye Park; Zorlu Center		
Vakko; Fabiana; Filippi	Zorlu Center		
Vakko; Kuzu; Effect		Ankara, Züfrü Tigrel St., Oran, Çankaya	
Vakko; Mare		Bodrum; İzmir ("Swiss", Celal Bayar, Çeşme)	Swim- and beachwear
Vakko; Mare & Fabiana	Kanyon mall, Esentepe, Şişli		
Other divisions
Vakko; Boutique/ Vakko; Kiosk	Istanbul (20): Akbatı; Buyaka; Canpark; Capacity; Capitol; Carousel; Cevahir; Forum; Hilltown; Historia; İSTMarina; Mall of Istanbul; Metropol; Meydan; ÖzdilekPark; Palladium; Piazza Maltepe; Ritz-Carlton hotel; Marriott hotel; Istanbul Airport	Boutique (27): Ankara (3): Anakmall, Cepa AVM, Metromall, Taurus AVM; Antalya (2): Terracity AVM, Cullinan; Bursa: Zafer Plaza; Denizli: Denizli Forum Çamlık AVM; Diyarbakır: Forum Diyarbakır AVM; Erzurum: MNG AVM; Eskişehir: Espark AVM; Gaziantep: Gaziantep Primemall AVM; İskenderun, Hatay: Park Forbes AVM; İzmir (3): Agora AVM, Forum Bornova AVM, İzmir Optimum AVM; Kahramanmaraş: Piazza AVM; Kayseri (2): Forum Kayseri, Kayseri Park; Konya (3): Karaciğan Karatay (Ankara Cd.), Kentplaza AVM, Konya Enteppe; Mersin Marina; Sakarya Province (2): Ada AVM, Serdivan AVM; Samsun: Piazza AVM; Şanlıurfa: Piazza AVM; Trabzon: Forum AVM; Kiosk (4): Adana: M1 Adana; Ankara (2): Antares, Bilkent Center; Bodrum: Midtown Bodrum AVM; Former: Frankfurt am Main (2003–?); Hamburg (2003–?)	Format launched 1993
Vakko Home	İstinye Park; Kanyon; Zorlu Center	Bodrum; Bursa; İzmir (Çeşme Marina)	Format launched in 2009
Vakko Wedding	Emaar Square; İstinye Park; Nişantaşı; Bağdat Avenue in Suadiye; Zorlu Center	Adana; Ankara; Antalya; Bursa; İzmir	
Vakko Outlet	8 locations	Ankara (2); Antalya; Gaziantep; İzmir; İzmit	
Vakkorama	9 locations	İzmir (4); Bodrum area (3); Ankara (3); Bursa (2); Adana; Antalya	23 locations. Launched in 1982, youth lifestyle stores with fashion, gifts, electronics, music, and art.
V2K Designers	In Vakkorama stores, plus dedicated boutiques at Akmerkez and in Nişantaşı, formerly also at Kanyon mall.		Since 2000 a designer-focused section within Vakkorama and since 2015 also in Vakko full-line department stores. Its original name was Vakkorama V2K.
Vakko L'Atelier			Vakko Patisserie bakery, ice cream, chocolates (counter for takeaway and sales of packaged items); Vakko Bistrot full-service bistro

Defunct formats as of June 2024:

- Vakko 365 Single location at Kanyon mall, converted in 2020 from a Vakko dept. store. Offered current as well as previous-season fashion.

=== Bağdat Avenue (Suadiye) store ===
Since 1996, the Vakko department store's Suadiye branch has been located in a historic yalı (typical wooden villa/summer house) along the upscale Bağdat Caddesi on the Asian side of Istanbul. In the survey by Kadıköy Platformu asking which store consumers liked the most for its appearance and displays, 76% answered the Vakko Suadiye mansion. Vakko's December seasonal decorations are especially popular, with multiple decorated trees (Christmas tree/New Year tree-style) and a merry-go-round in front of the store, and more trees, wreaths and candles within. In 2012 the store created artificial snow which fell in front of the store. For New Year's 2018, newspaper Hürriyet awarded Vakko Suadiye the status of "best decorated stores in the city".

== Non-retail businesses ==
- Vakko Hotel and Residence, Istanbul
- Vakko Esmod, fashion institute (educational institution)
- VET Vakko School of Hospitality and Service, in partnership with the École hôtelière de Lausanne (Lausanne Hotel School, Switzerland) opened 2024
- Vitali Hakko Creative Industries Library
- Power Media (PowerFM launched 1992, see below)

== Power Media ==
Power Media a.k.a. Power Grup, with about 15% of the radio market in Turkey in 2014 whose operations include:

  - Radio stations ^{(tr)}, Power FM,^{(tr)} Power TürkFM^{(tr)} Radyo Fenomen, Power Love FM
  - Power TV^{(tr)} Power Garage TV, PowerTürk TV, Power Dance TV, Power Love TV, PowerTürk Akustik TV, PowerTürk Slow TV, and PowerTürk Taptaze TV music video channels

The Power Group was launched in 1992 with Power FM, a national radio station, followed by Power XL and PowerTürk radio, PowerTürk television in 2003, Radyo Fenomen in 2008, Power Garage TV in 2012 and Power Love FM in 2012. 160 employees work at the Power Media Center (joint HQ building with Vakko) that includes radio and TV studios.
