= Great Synagogue of Rome attack =

1982 Palestinian terrorist attack in Rome, Italy

Coordinates: 41.8920°N 12.4780°E

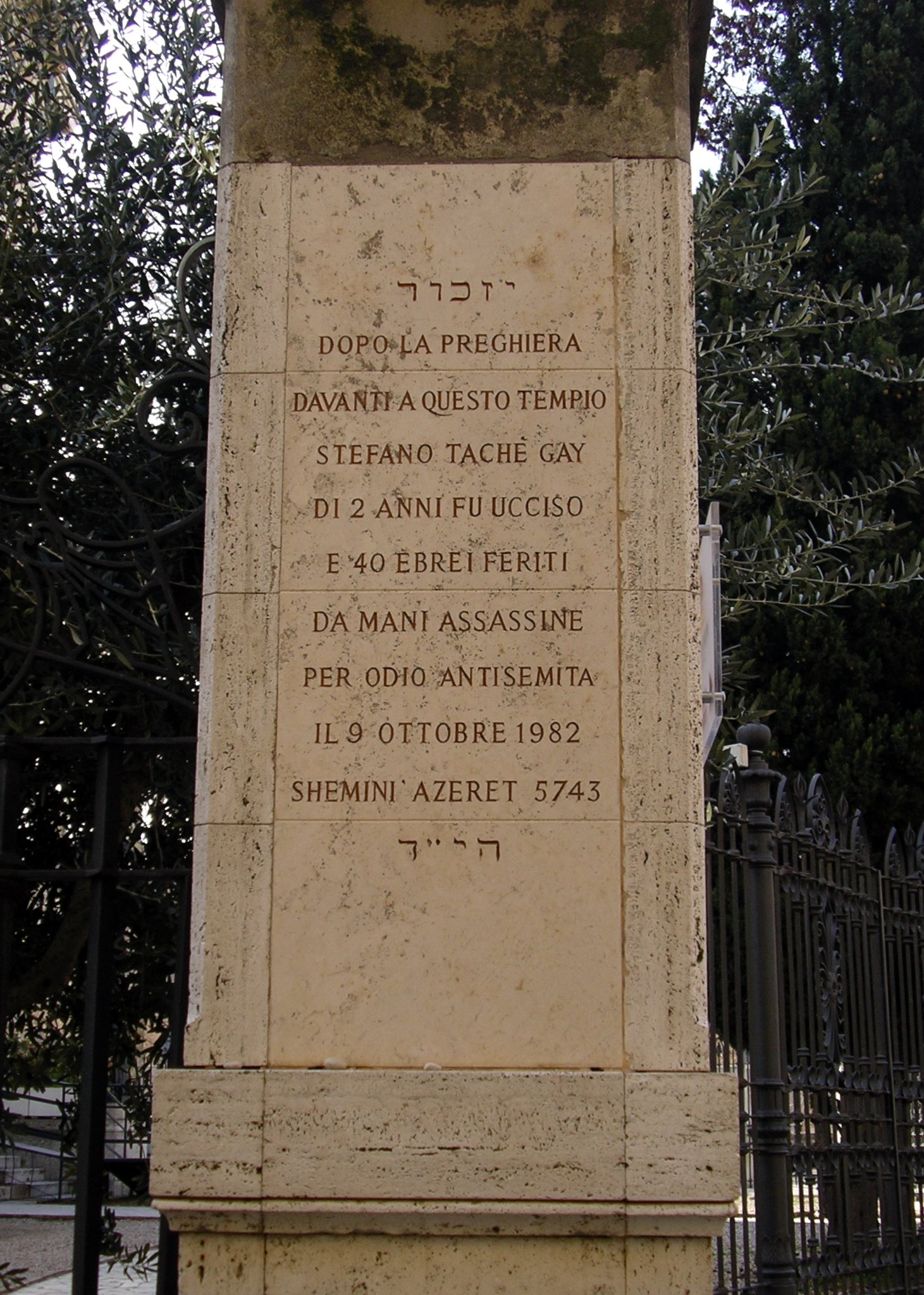
- Memorial to the victim of the attack on 9 October 1982 in Rome
- Location: The Great Synagogue of Rome in Rome, Italy
- Date: 9 October 1982; 44 years ago 11:55 am
- Target: Italian Jews
- Attack type: Grenade and mass shooting attack
- Weapons: Hand grenades submachine guns
- Deaths: 1
- Injuries: 37 civilians
- Victims: 2-year-old toddler (Stefano Gaj Taché) was killed
- Perpetrators: 5 armed Palestinian militants of the Abu Nidal organization

The Great Synagogue of Rome attack, which was carried out by armed Palestinian terrorists at the entrance to the Great Synagogue of Rome, took place on 9 October 1982 at 11:55 a.m. A 2-year-old toddler, Stefano Gaj Taché, was killed in the attack, while 37 civilians were injured.

== Attack ==
The attack took place at the Great Synagogue of Rome in the historic district of Rome on Saturday morning, at 11:55 a.m. As the families of the local Jewish community began leaving with their children from the back entrance to the synagogue, five elegantly dressed armed Palestinian attackers walked calmly up to the back entrance of the synagogue and threw at least three hand grenades at the crowd, and afterwards sprayed the crowd with sub-machine gun fire. Eyewitnesses at the scene stated that the hand grenades bounced off the steps and exploded in the street. A 2-year-old toddler, Stefano Gaj Taché, was killed in the attack after being hit by shrapnel. In addition, 37 civilians were injured, among them Stefano's brother, 4-year-old Gadiel Taché, who was shot in the head and chest.

Eyewitnesses at the scene stated that after the attack, the attackers left the scene in a red Volkswagen and a white Austin.

== Perpetrators ==
No group claimed responsibility for the attack. Nevertheless, one of the assailants was identified as Osama Abdel al-Zomar, an alleged member of the Abu Nidal terrorist organization. Al-Zomar was later on arrested in Greece, for illegal smuggling of explosives. Although al-Zomar was convicted by an Italian court for his part in the 1982 attack (while he was in Greek custody), nevertheless, the Greek authorities denied an Italian extradition request and instead deported him in 1989 to Libya, where Abu Nidal's home base was located, and where he is believed to be living.

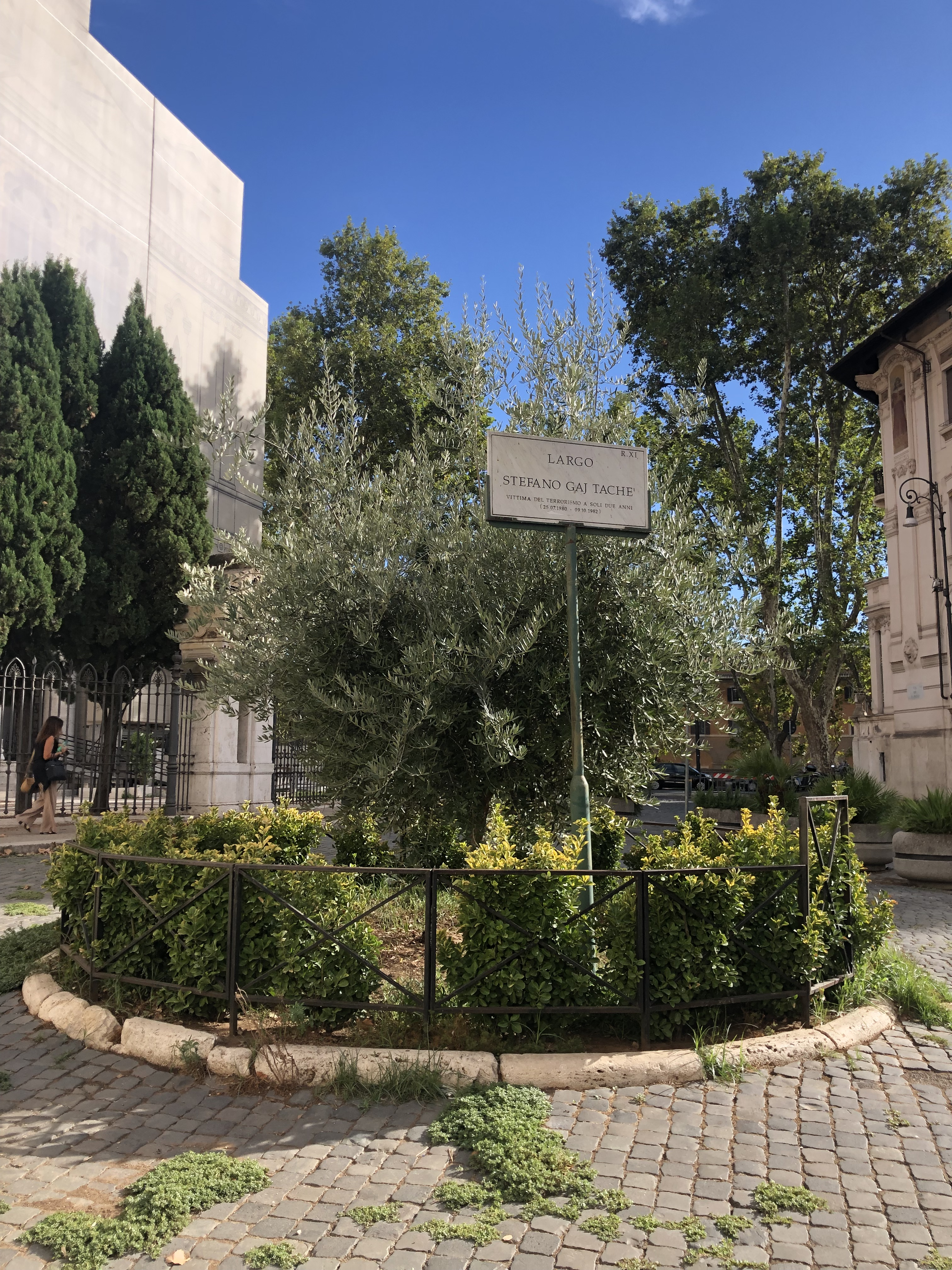
Tree planted in memory of Stefano Gaj Taché, the 2-year-old toddler killed in the attack. The commemorative plaque reads "Stefano Gaj Taché, victim of terrorism at only two years of age".

== Aftermath ==
A plate has been fixed at the entrance to the synagogue in commemoration of the 1982 Great Synagogue of Rome attack.

On 3 February 2015, during the message to the Italian Parliament following his taking of the oath as President of the Italian Republic, Sergio Mattarella remembered the attack with these words: "(Italy) has paid several times, in a not too distant past, the price of hate and intolerance. I want to remember only one name: Stefano Taché, who was killed in the cowardly terrorist attack on the synagogue in Rome in October 1982. He was only two years old. He was our baby, an Italian baby".

== Accusations of Italian knowledge of the attack ==
In 2008, former Italian prime minister and President of the Republic, Francesco Cossiga claimed that Italy "sold out its Jews" with a secret agreement to not interfere with PLO activities against Jews on the condition that the PLO not conduct attacks against Italy. On 11 December 2021, the Times of Israel published an article claiming that the Government of Italy knew about the attack beforehand and had reduced security as part of a secret agreement with the PLO from 1973. The article cited newly published government cables. The cables are purported to show that the Servizio per le Informazioni e la Sicurezza Democratica warned the government of Palestinian organizations preparing to attack during the holiday and that a source had indicated that Abu Nidal was preparing to conduct an attack. The articles further claimed that the police presence that should have been at the Synagogue was not present.

== See also ==
- List of attacks attributed to Abu Nidal
- Neve Shalom Synagogue massacre
- Terrorism in the European Union
