= Kilyos =

Kilyos Kumköy, Κυλλαίος
- Neighbourhood
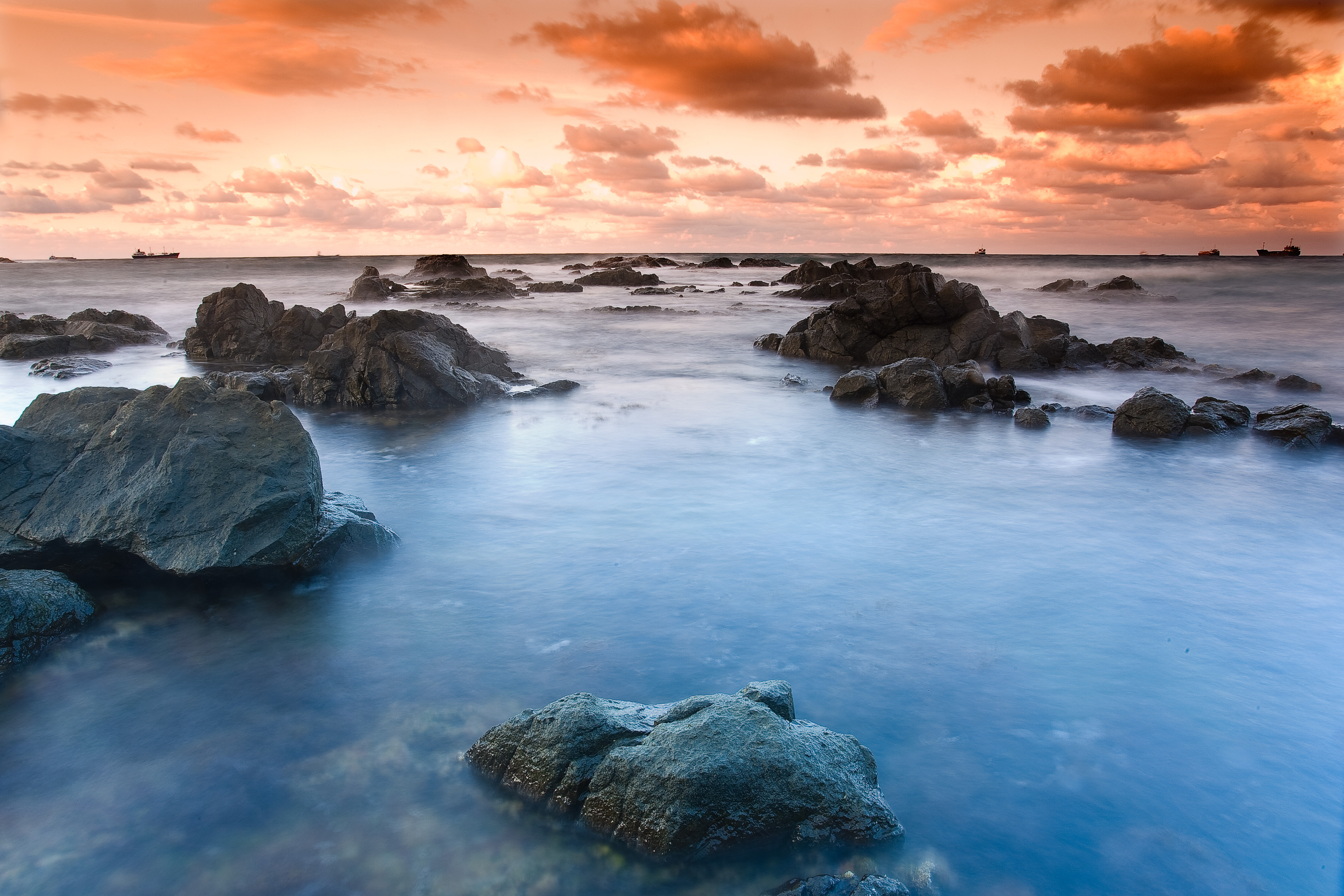
- Dalia Beach in Kilyos

- Location within Turkey Location within Istanbul
- Coordinates: 41°14′57″N 29°02′15″E
- Country: Turkey
- Province: Istanbul
- District: Sarıyer
- Population (2022): 3,860
- Time zone: UTC+3 (TRT)
- Postal code: 34450

Kilyos, also Kumköy, is a neighbourhood in the municipality and district of Sarıyer, Istanbul Province, Turkey. Its population is 3,860 (2022). It is also a well-known seaside resort on the Black Sea coast of the European side of Istanbul Province, famous for its beaches.

== Places to see ==
There is a 14th-century Genoese castle in the village, which was restored during the era of the Ottoman sultan Mahmud II, but it is not publicly accessible since it is located in the military zone. A historical cistern, eight cannons, and a 26-meter-high monumental plane tree are also within the castle area.

== Climate ==
Climate data for Kilyos (1991–2020)
Month	Jan	Feb	Mar	Apr	May	Jun	Jul	Aug	Sep	Oct	Nov	Dec	Year
Mean daily maximum °C (°F)	9.3 (48.7)	9.8 (49.6)	12.2 (54.0)	15.9 (60.6)	20.8 (69.4)	25.8 (78.4)	28.4 (83.1)	28.8 (83.8)	25.2 (77.4)	20.4 (68.7)	15.6 (60.1)	11.3 (52.3)	18.7 (65.7)
Daily mean °C (°F)	6.1 (43.0)	6.2 (43.2)	8.1 (46.6)	11.5 (52.7)	16.3 (61.3)	21.1 (70.0)	23.9 (75.0)	24.5 (76.1)	20.7 (69.3)	16.4 (61.5)	11.9 (53.4)	8.1 (46.6)	14.6 (58.3)
Mean daily minimum °C (°F)	3.1 (37.6)	3.1 (37.6)	4.5 (40.1)	7.6 (45.7)	12.2 (54.0)	16.6 (61.9)	19.5 (67.1)	20.7 (69.3)	16.7 (62.1)	12.9 (55.2)	8.5 (47.3)	5.0 (41.0)	10.9 (51.6)
Average precipitation mm (inches)	84.81 (3.34)	78.58 (3.09)	71.82 (2.83)	47.55 (1.87)	37.13 (1.46)	34.15 (1.34)	28.04 (1.10)	43.39 (1.71)	94.84 (3.73)	94.94 (3.74)	89.21 (3.51)	115.4 (4.54)	819.86 (32.28)
Average precipitation days (≥ 1.0 mm)	11.7	10	9	6.5	5	4.7	3.7	3.7	5.8	8.2	8.9	12.1	89.3
Average relative humidity (%)	79.4	78.8	76.9	76.9	78.8	77.8	75.8	75.6	75.3	78.4	79.0	78.8	77.6
Source: NOAA

== Gallery ==
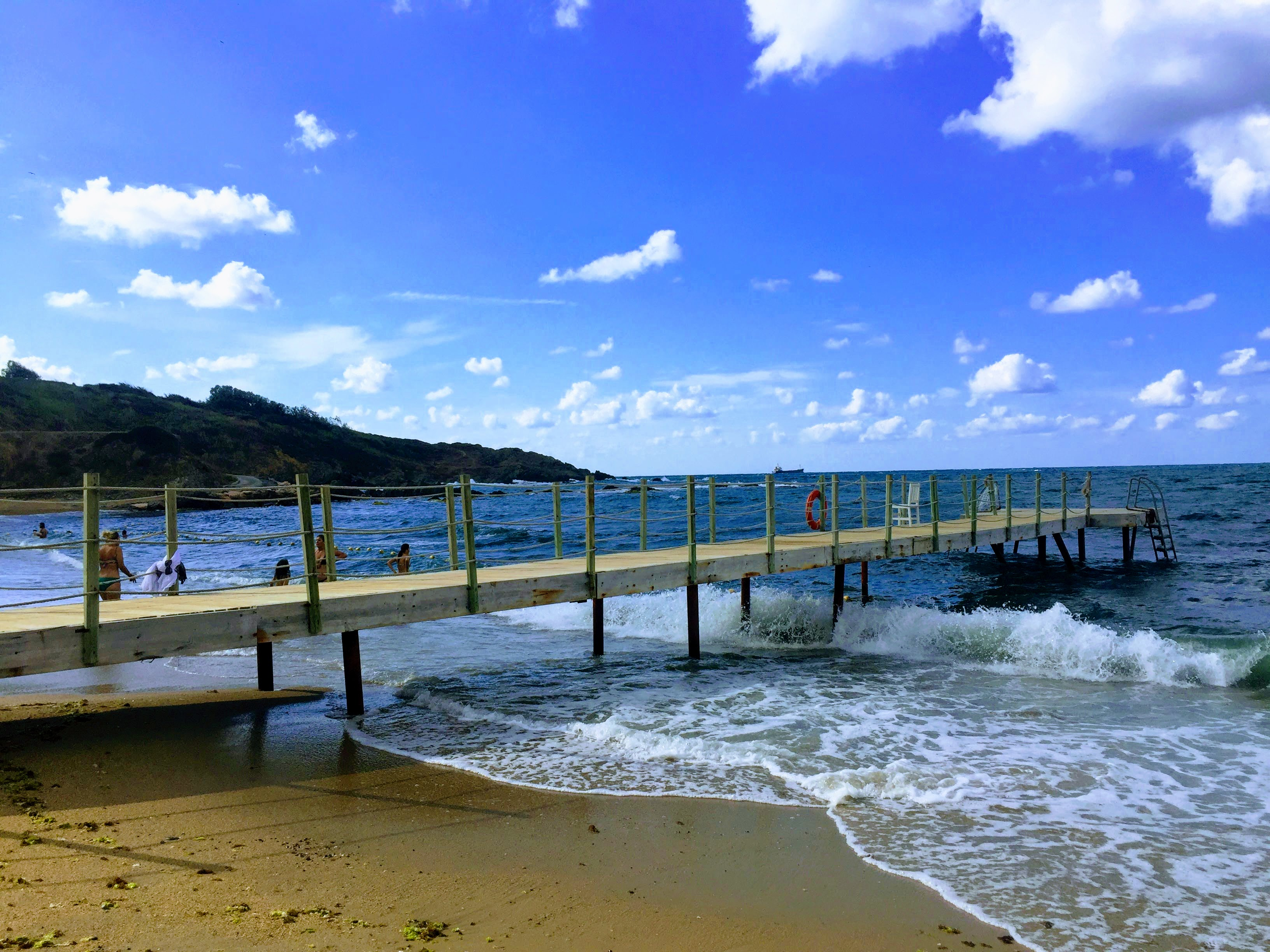
Milyon Beach in Kilyos

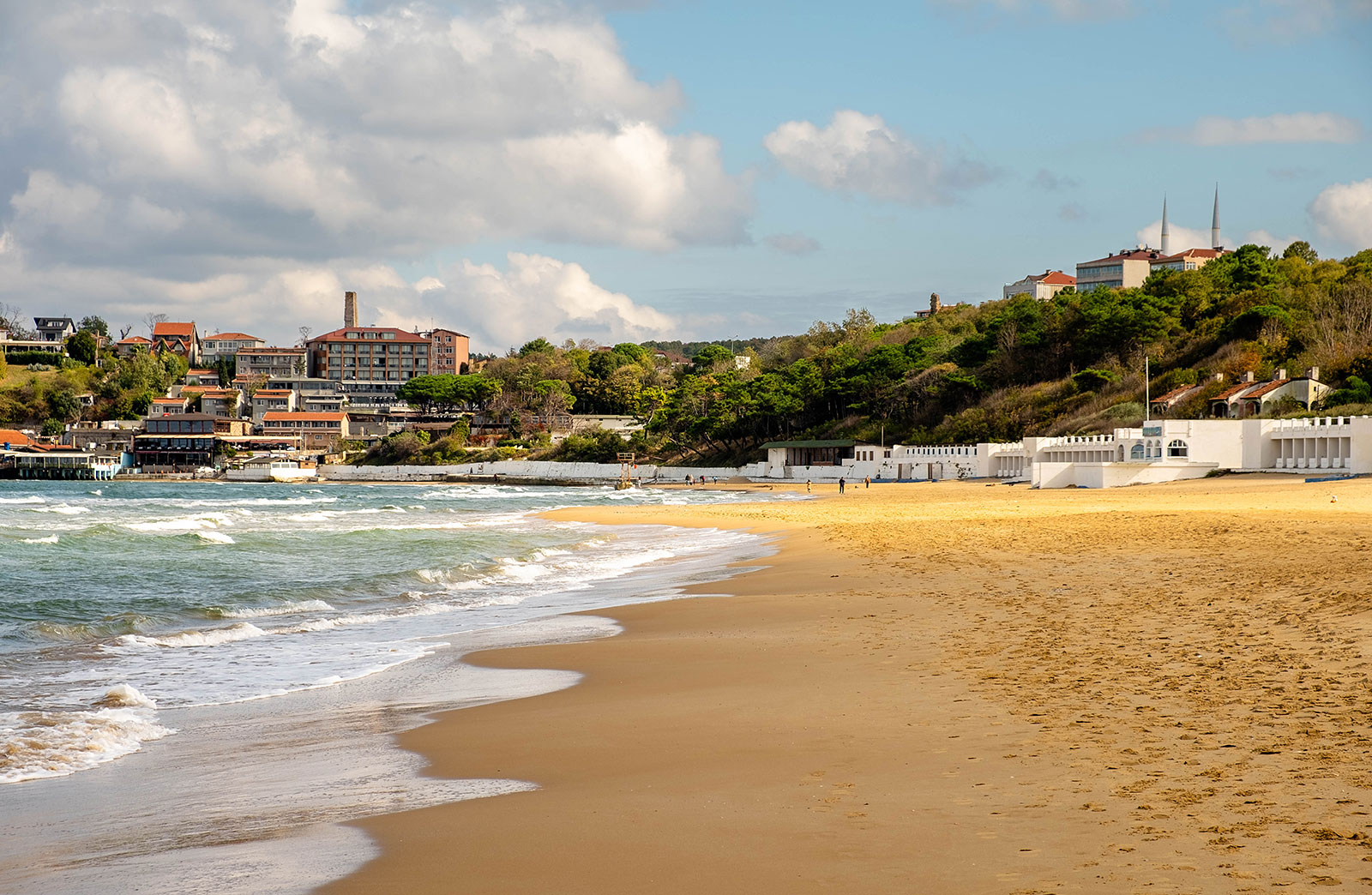
Shores of Kilyos

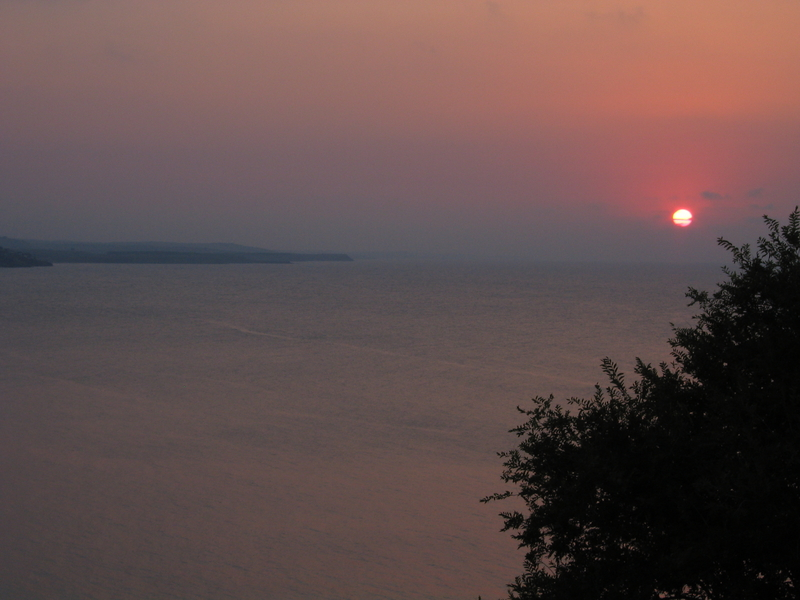
Kilyos shores during twilight
