= Neve Shalom Synagogue =

Synagogue in Istanbul, Turkey

- Turkish: Neve Şalom Sinagogu; Hebrew: בית הכנסת נווה שלום
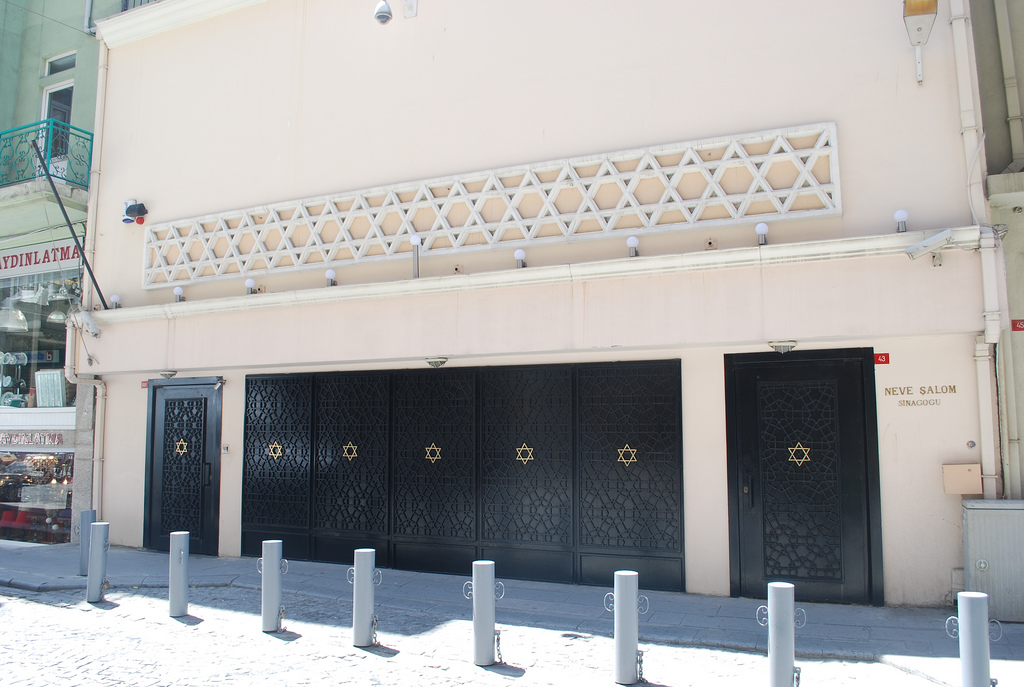
- The synagogue, with bollards, in 2009

- Location of the synagogue in Istanbul

Religion
- Affiliation: Judaism
- Rite: Nusach Sefard
- Ecclesiastical or organizational status: Synagogue
- Status: Active

Location
- Location: Büyük Hendek Caddesi 61, Karaköy, Beyoğlu (Galata), Istanbul, Istanbul Province
- Country: Turkey
- Interactive map of Neve Shalom Synagogue
- Coordinates: 41°01′37″N 28°58′21″E

Architecture
- Architects: Elyo Ventura; Bernar Motola
- Type: Synagogue architecture
- Groundbreaking: 1949
- Completed: 1951

Specifications
- Capacity: 2,000 worshippers
- Materials: Brick

Website
- nevesalom.org

The Neve Shalom Synagogue (Turkish: Neve Şalom Sinagogu; Hebrew: בית הכנסת נווה שלום, romanized: Oasis (or Valley) of Peace) is a Jewish congregation and synagogue, located at Büyük Hendek Caddesi 61, in the Karaköy quarter of the Beyoğlu district of Istanbul, in the Istanbul Province of Turkey.

== History ==
The synagogue was built in response to an increase in the Jewish population in the old Galata neighborhood (today encompassed by Beyoğlu district) in the late 1930s. The Neve Shalom Synagogue is the central and largest Sephardic synagogue in Istanbul, open to service especially on Shabbats, High Holidays, bar mitzvahs, funerals and weddings.

A Jewish primary school was torn down in 1949 for that purpose and the synagogue was built on its ruins. The construction completed in 1951. Its architects were Elyo Ventura and Bernar Motola, young Turkish Jews. The inauguration of the synagogue was held on Sunday, March 25, 1951 (17 Adar 5711, Hebrew calendar), in the presence of the Chief Rabbi of Turkey of the time, Hahambaşı Rav. Rafael David Saban.

=== Terrorist attacks ===
The Neve Shalom Synagogue has been impacted by terrorist attacks in 1986, 1992, and 2003.

On September 6, 1986, gunmen opened fire during a Shabbat service, which resulted in the death of 22 people. The attack was attributed to the Palestinian militant Abu Nidal.

On March 1, 1992, a bomb attack was carried out by two men, causing no damage or casualties.

On November 16, 2003, the synagogue was hit by one of four car bomb attacks carried out in Istanbul that week (see 2003 Istanbul bombings). Even though a local Turkish militant group, the Great Eastern Islamic Raiders' Front, claimed responsibility for the attacks, police claimed the bombings were "too sophisticated to have been carried out by that group", with a senior Israeli government source saying: "the attack must have been at least coordinated with international terror organizations".

== See also ==
- History of the Jews in Turkey
- List of synagogues in Turkey
