= Ohel Yaakov Synagogue =

Ohel Ya'akov Synagogue, or Ohel Yaakov Synagogue, is the name of several Jewish synagogues and congregations and may refer to:

- Ohel Yaakov Synagogue, the ruins of a synagogue destroyed during Kristallnacht in Munich, Germany
- Ohel Yaakov Synagogue, Tondano, now known as Sha'ar Hashamayim Synagogue, a synagogue in Sulawesi, Indonesia
- Ohel Ya'akov Synagogue (Zikhron Ya'akov), a synagogue in Israel
- Ohel Yackov Synagogue, a synagogue in Milan, Italy
- Ohel Yaakov Synagogue, a synagogue in Burgazada, Turkey
- Ohel Yakov Congregation, a congregation in Baltimore, United States
- Ohel Yaacob Synagogue, a synagogue in New Jersey, United States

== See also ==
- Choral Ohel Yaakov Synagogue, in Kaunas, Lithuania
