= Grand Synagogue of Edirne =

Synagogue in Edirne, Turkey

Grand Synagogue of Edirne Adrianople Synagogue
- Turkish: Edirne Büyük Sinagogu; Hebrew: קל קדוש הגדול
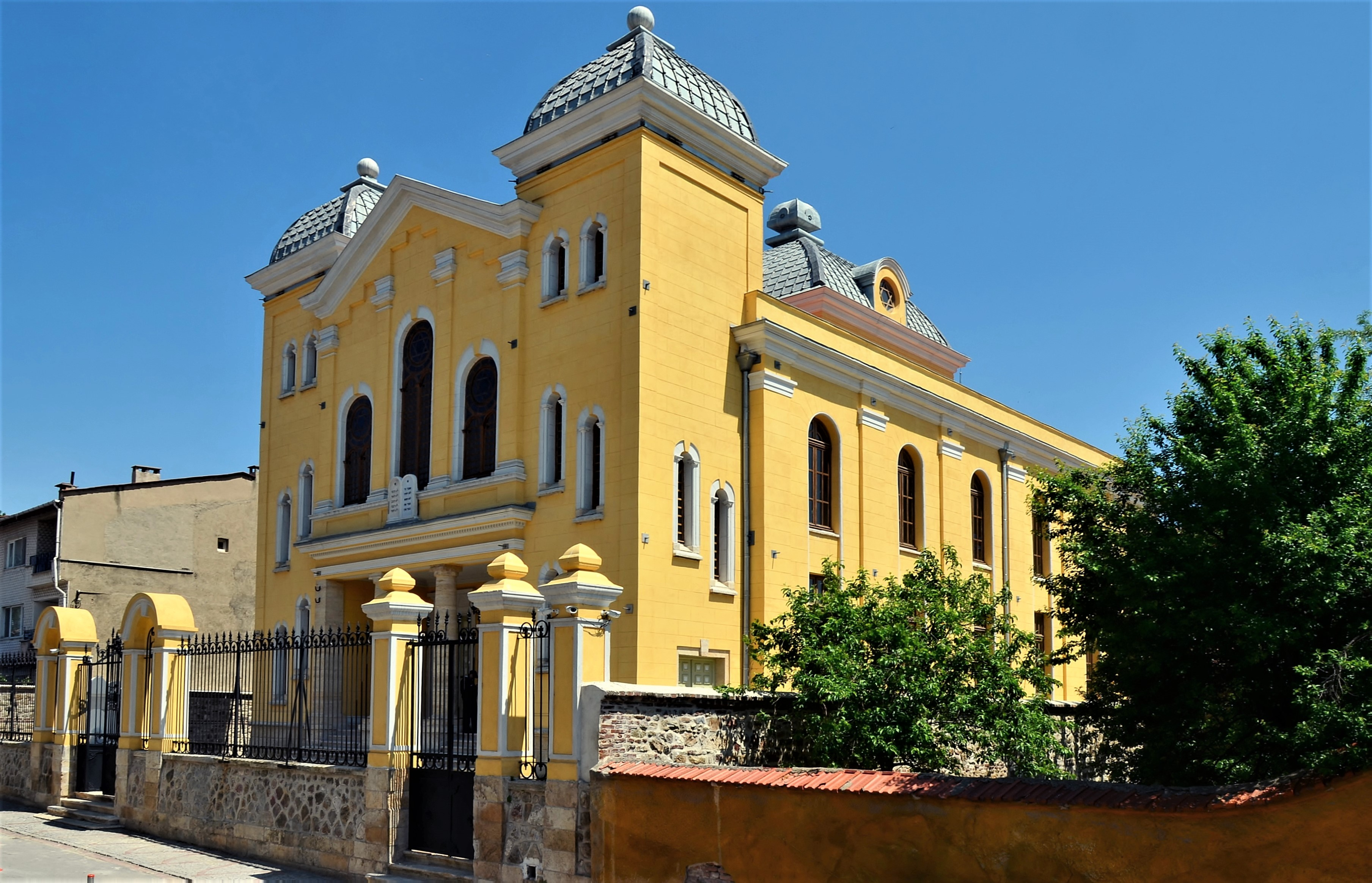
- The synagogue following restoration, in 2015

- Location of the synagogue in the Marmara region of Turkey

Religion
- Affiliation: Judaism
- Rite: Nusach Sefard
- Ecclesiastical or organisational status: Synagogue (1906–1983; and since 2015)
- Status: Active

Location
- Location: 10 Maarif Street, Edirne, Marmara region
- Country: Turkey
- Coordinates: 41°40′18″N 26°33′06″E

Architecture
- Architect: France Depré
- Type: Synagogue architecture
- Style: Moorish Revival
- Groundbreaking: 1906
- Completed: 1909; 2015 (restoration)
- Construction cost: 1,200 gold coins

Specifications
- Capacity: 1,200 worshippers
- Materials: Brick

The Grand Synagogue of Edirne (Hebrew: קל קדוש הגדול; Turkish: Edirne Büyük Sinagogu), also known as the Adrianople Synagogue, is a synagogue, located in Maarif Street, Edirne, in the Marmara region of Turkey.

Completed in 1909 in the Moorish Revival style, the synagogue was restored following World War II, abandoned in the 1980s, and restored as an active synagogue in 2015.

== History ==
The 1905 Great Fire of Adrianople destroyed more than 1,500 houses and also damaged several synagogues in the city. The twenty-thousand strong Jewish community urgently needed a place of worship. Following the permission of the Ottoman Government and the edict of Sultan Abdul Hamid II, the construction of a new synagogue began on January 6, 1906, at the site of the ruined synagogues Mayor and Pulya in Suriçi (Citadel) neighborhood. It was designed by the French architect France Depré in the architectural style of the Sephardi Leopoldstädter Tempel in Vienna, Austria. Costing 1,200 gold coins, it was opened to service on the eve of Pesach (Passover) in April 1909. Capable of accommodating up to 1,200 worshipers (900 men and 300 women), it was Europe's third-largest temple and the largest in Turkey.

In 1983, the synagogue was abandoned after most of the Jewish community left the city, emigrating to Israel, Europe, or North America. In 1995, the temple by law came under the control of the governmental Turkish Foundations Institution.

== Restoration ==
The abandoned and ruined synagogue as well as its outbuilding were restored by the Turkish Foundations Institution in five years, spending ₺5,750,000 (approximately US$2.5 million). On March 26, 2015, the synagogue was reopened with a celebration and a Shacharit, morning prayer service, attended by a large number of Jews including Ishak Ibrahimzadeh (leader of the Jewish community in Turkey), Rav Naftali Haleva, deputy to Hakham Bashi (Chief Rabbi) Ishak Haleva, Bülent Arınç, Deputy Prime Minister of Turkey, and some other Turkish high officials. The worship was overseen by Rabbi David Azuz, who had led the service on the closing day 36 years before. The Municipality of Edirne hung a banner in the street of the synagogue and greeted the guests with the words "Welcome home, our old neighbors".

== Gallery ==
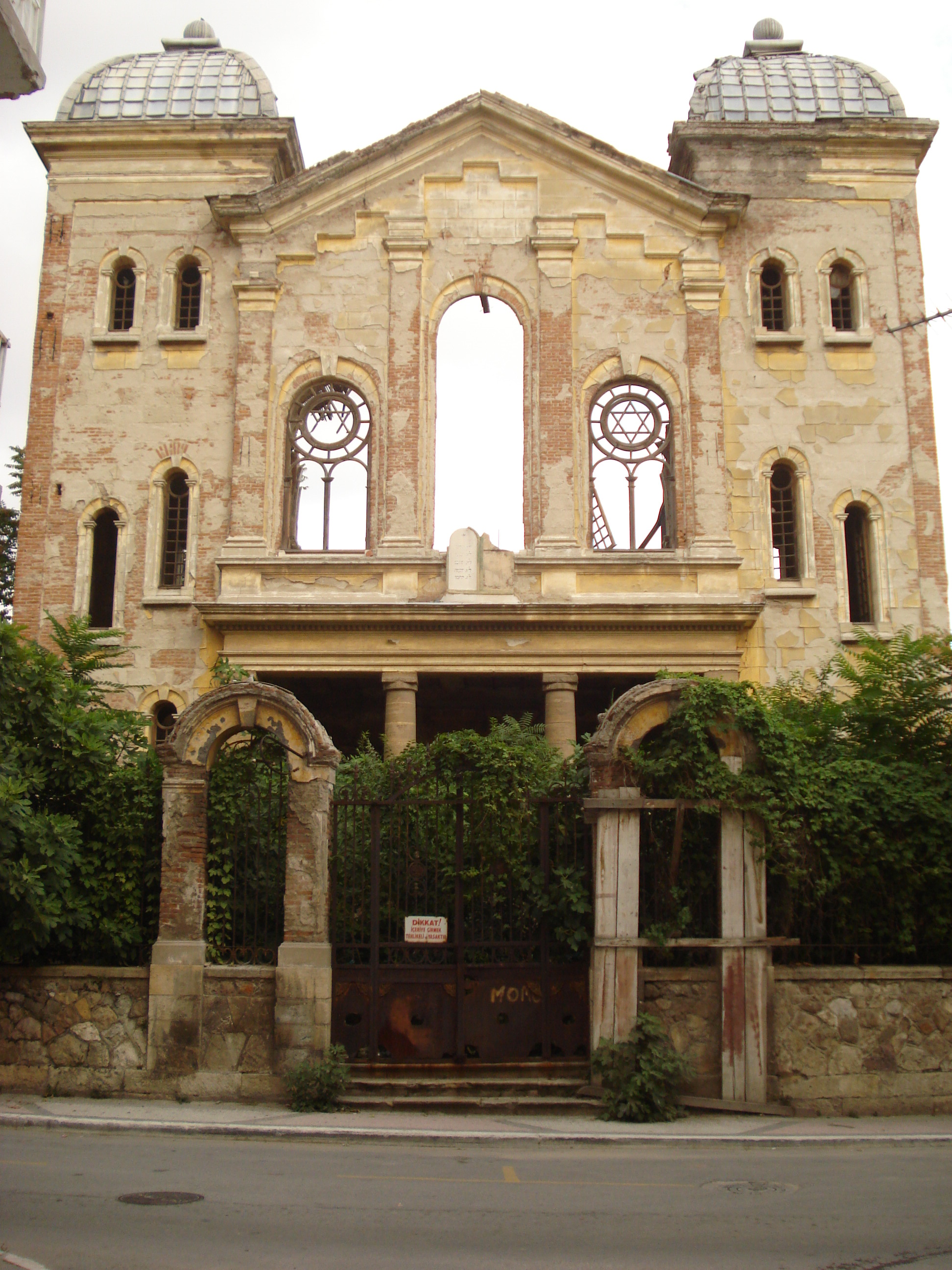
Facade of the ruined Synagogue before restoration

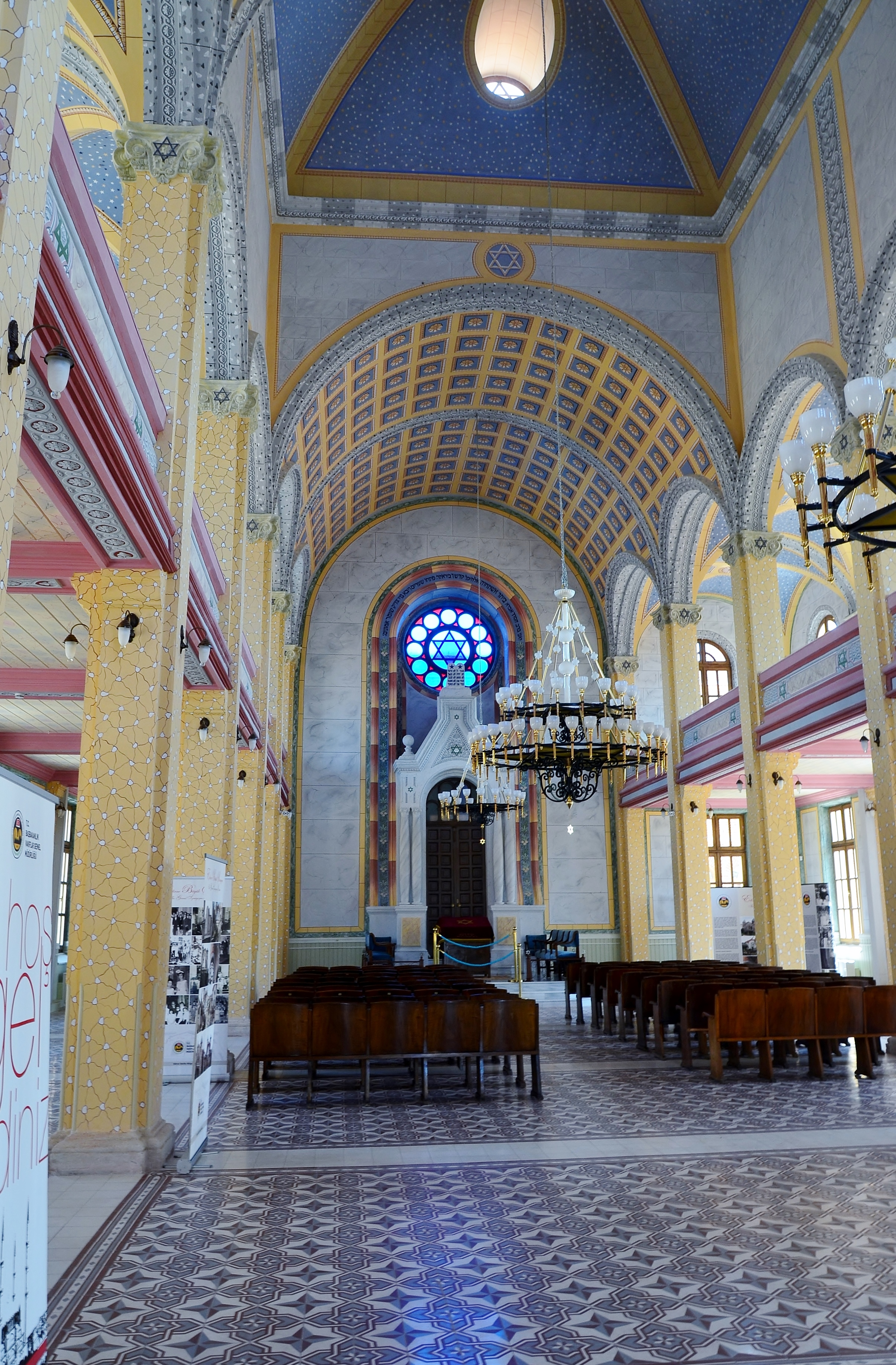
Interior of the synagogue

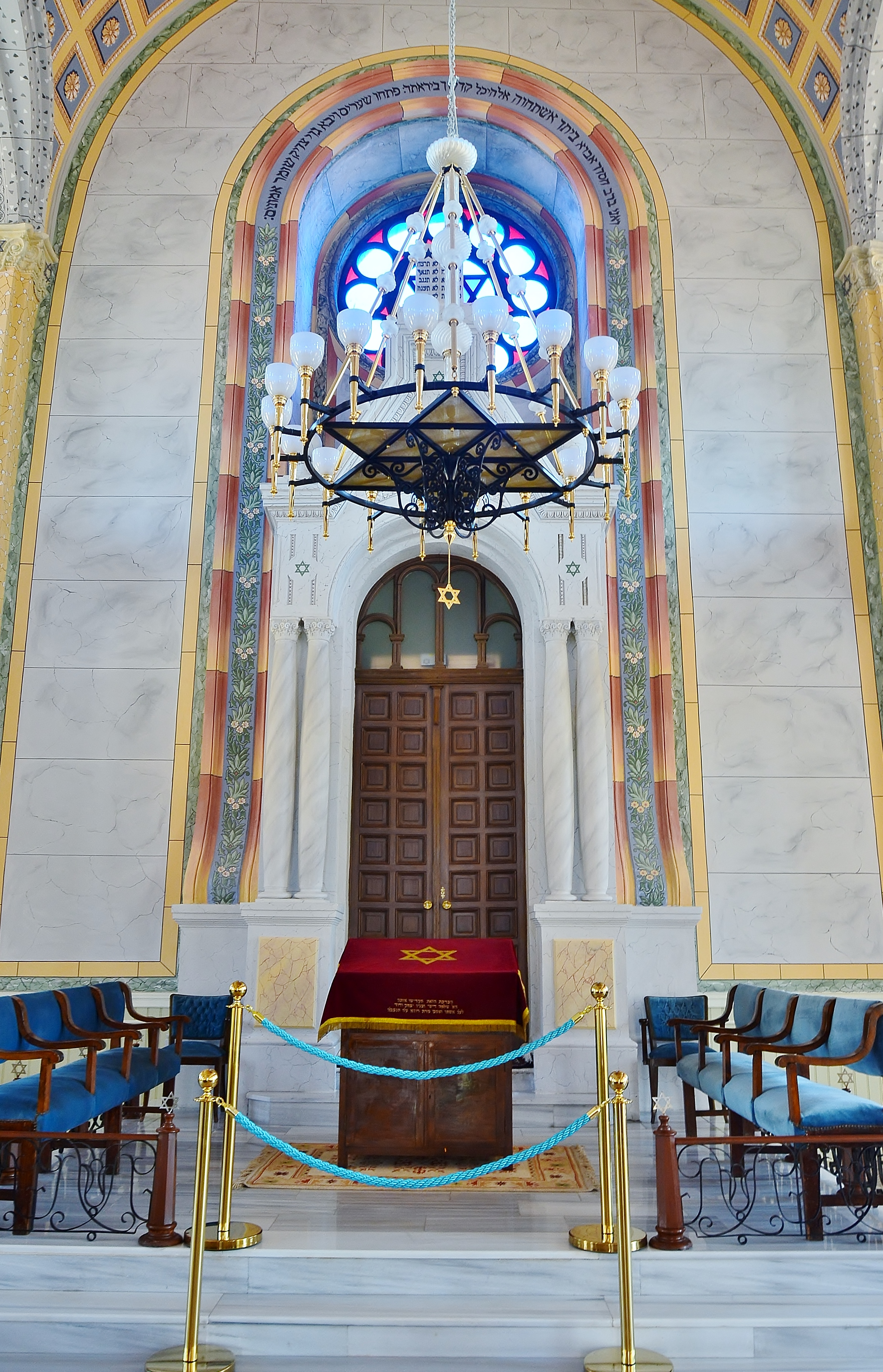
Interior of the synagogue

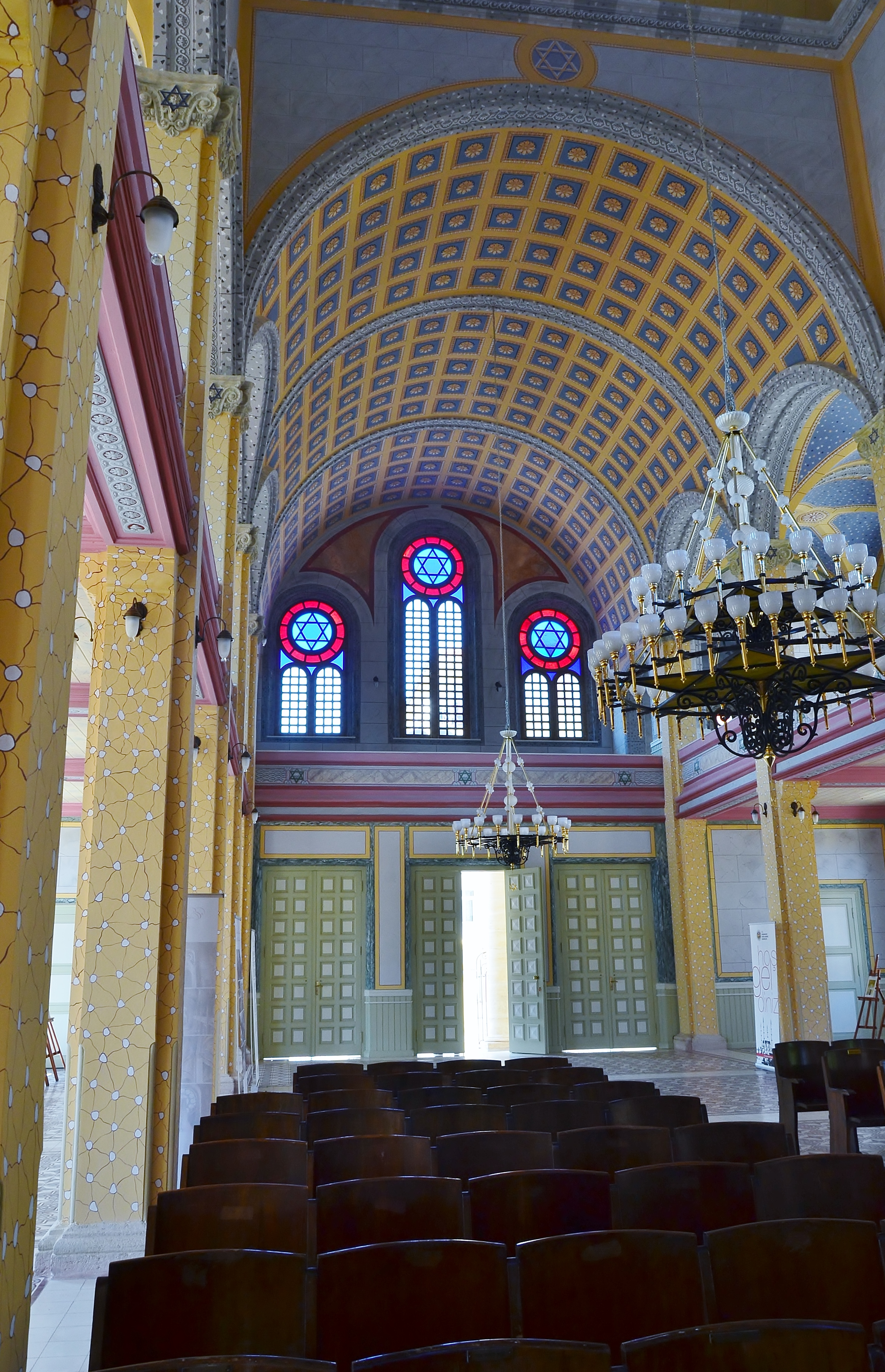
Interior of the synagogue

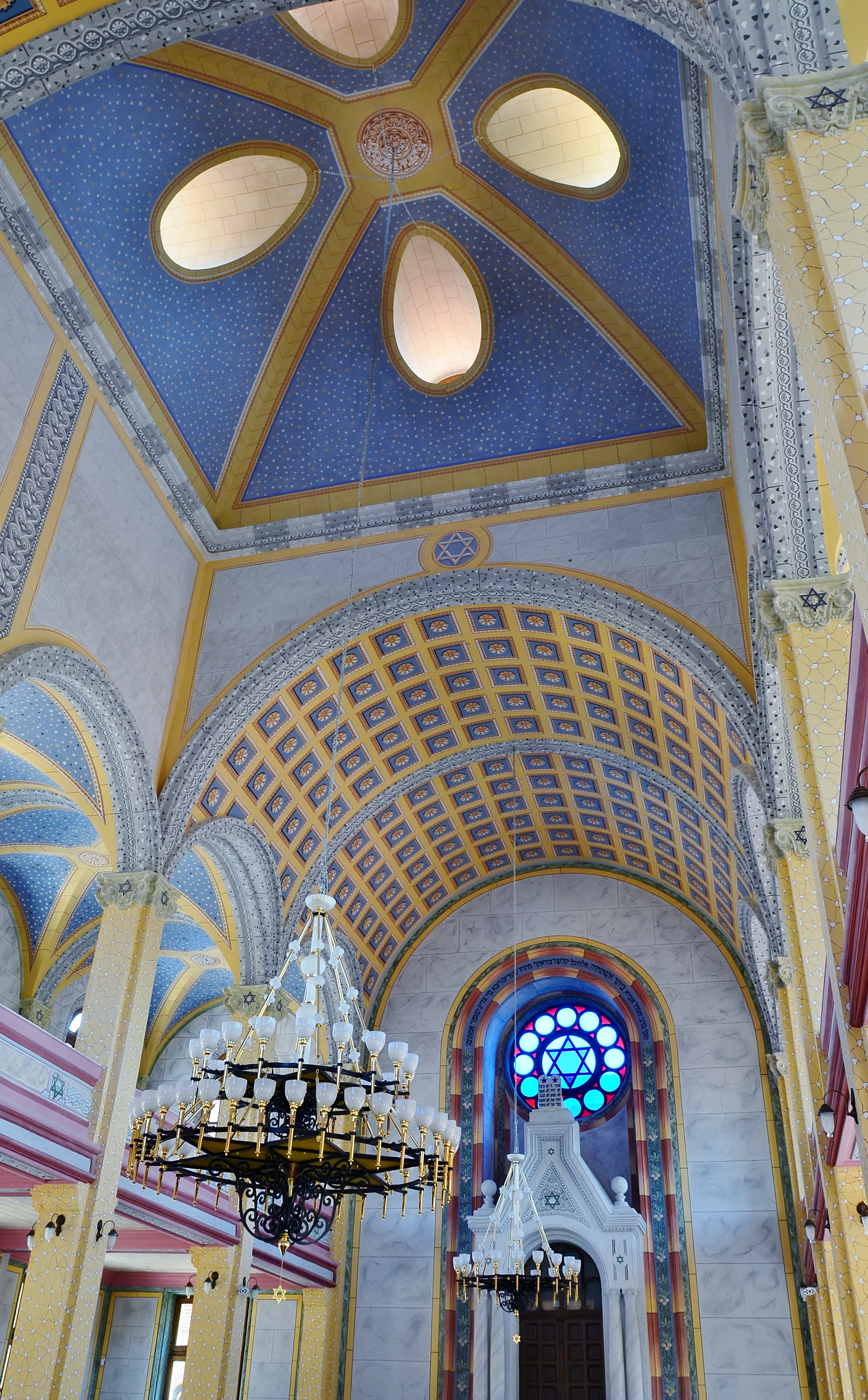
Interior of the synagogue

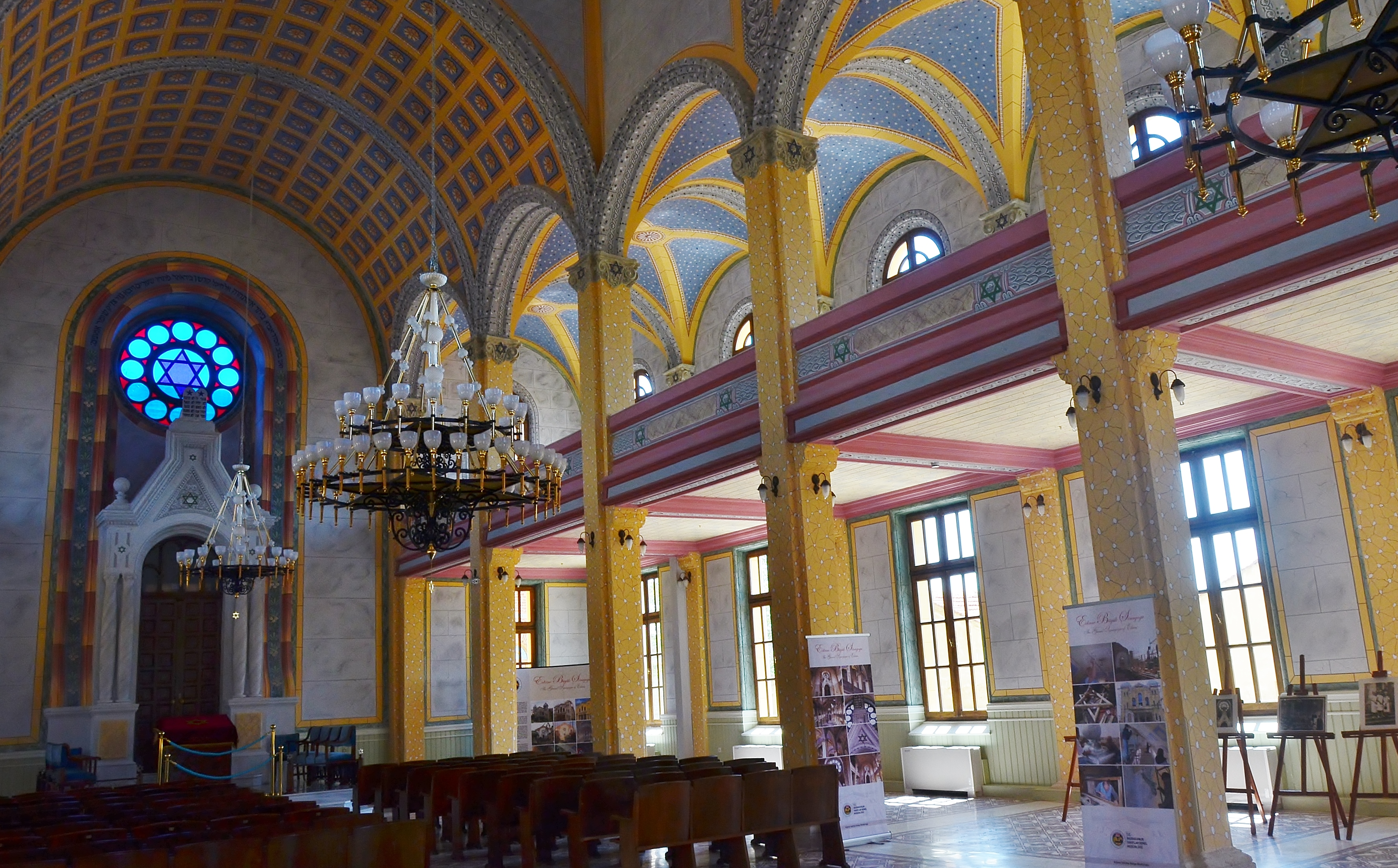
Interior of the synagogue

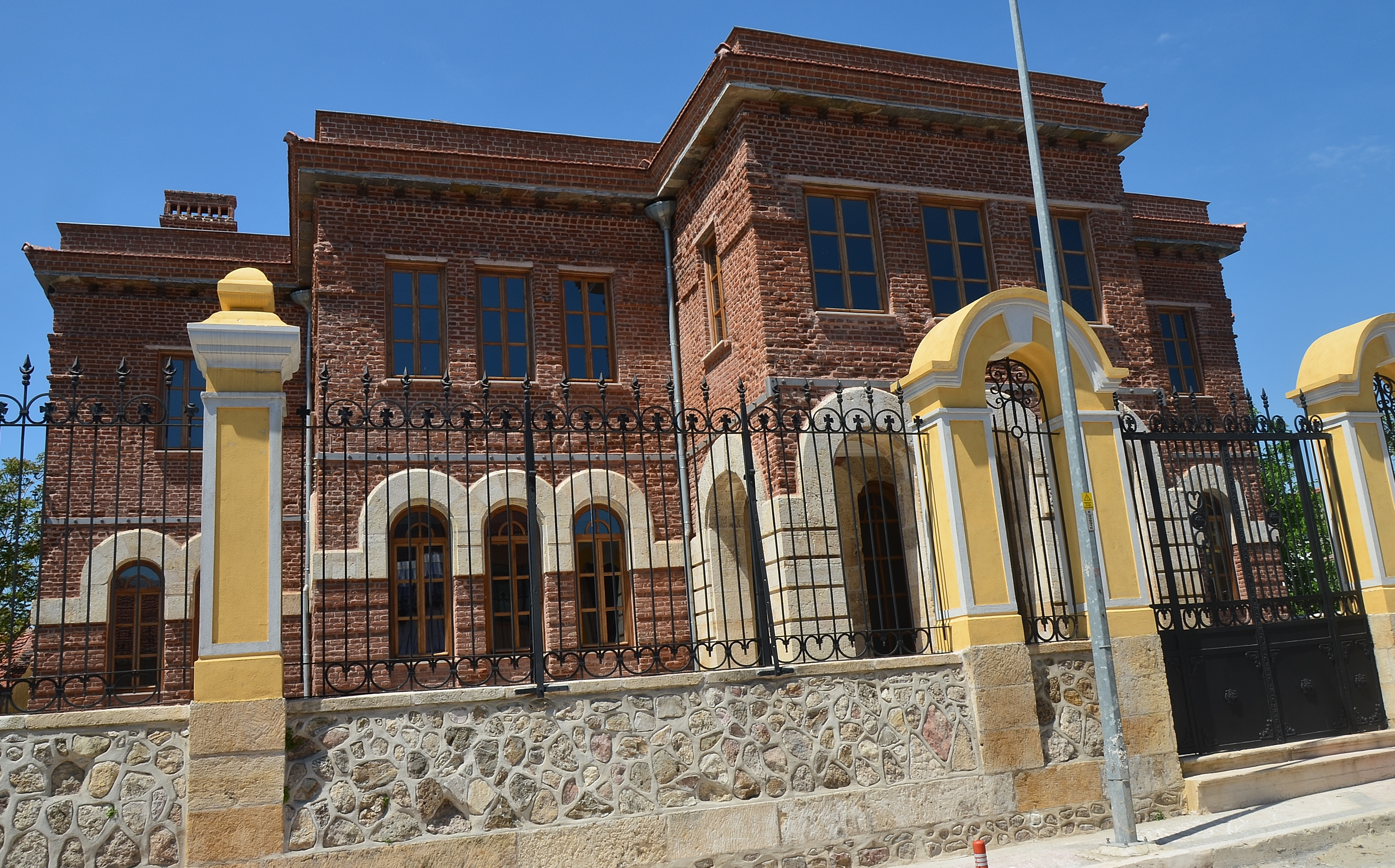
Administrative building backside Grand Synagogue of Edirne

== See also ==
- History of the Jews in Turkey
- List of synagogues in Turkey
