= Etz Ahayim Synagogue =

Synagogue in Istanbul, Turkey

- Hebrew: קהל קדוש עץ החיים
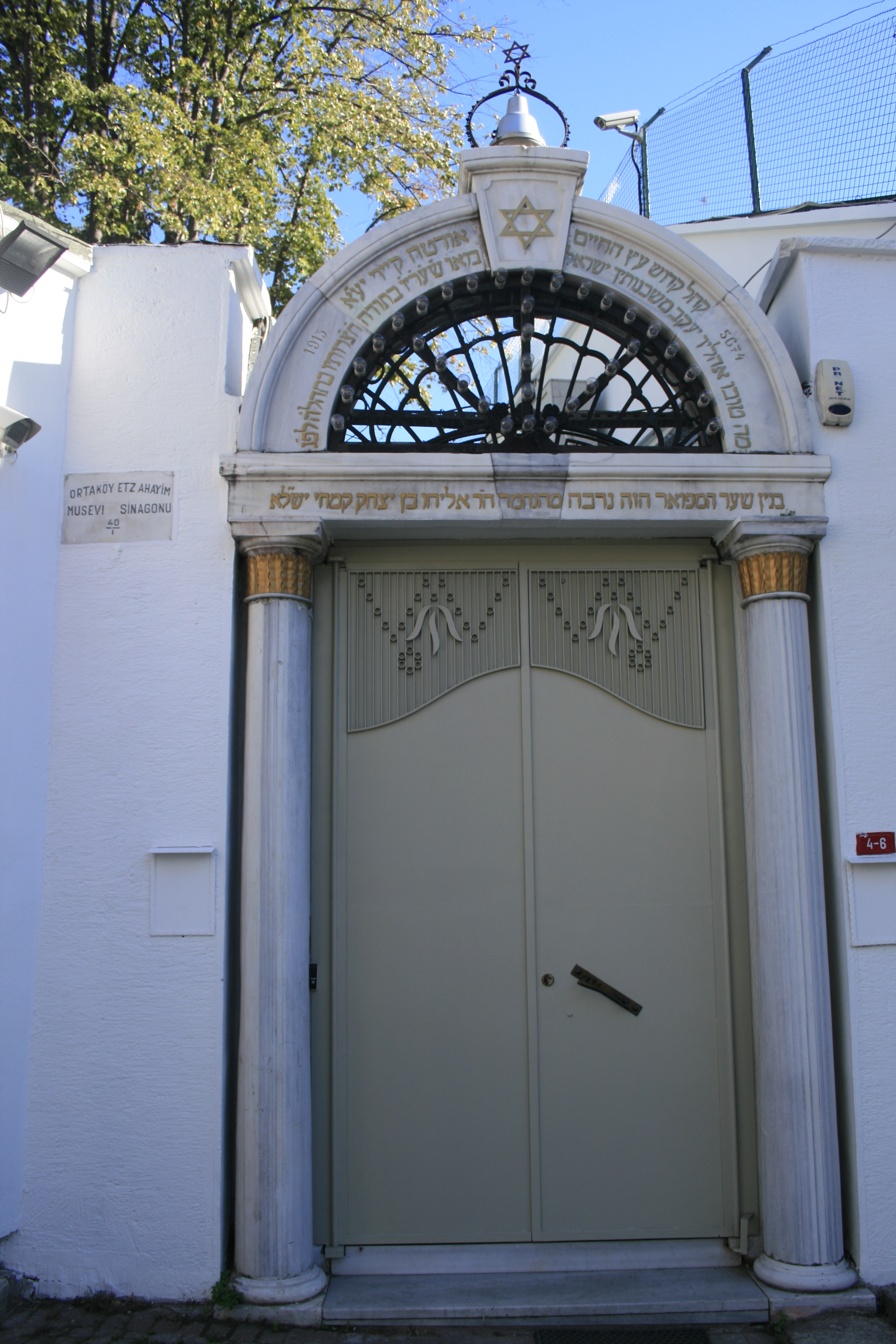
- The synagogue doorway, in 2007

- Location of the synagogue in Istanbul

Religion
- Affiliation: Judaism
- Rite: Nusach Sefard
- Ecclesiastical or organizational status: Synagogue
- Status: Active

Location
- Location: Icadiye Street, Ortaköy, Istanbul, Istanbul Province
- Country: Turkey
- Interactive map of Etz Ahayim Synagogue
- Coordinates: 41°02′38″N 29°00′46″E

Architecture
- Type: Synagogue architecture
- Completed: c. 1700s: 1941 & 1983 (rebuild)
- Materials: Brick

The Etz Ahayim Synagogue (Hebrew: קהל קדוש עץ החיים), also known as the Beit Yaakov Synagogue or the Ortaköy Synagogue, is a Jewish congregation and synagogue, located on Icadiye Street, in Ortaköy, on the coast near the right leg of Bosphorus Bridge, in Istanbul, in the Istanbul Province of Turkey.

It is unknown when the original synagogue was built, but it is estimated to be before 1703. The building also housed an academy for over one hundred years. The synagogue was totally destroyed by fire in 1941 with only the marble Aron Kodesh remaining intact. The synagogue was subsequently rebuilt. The synagogue serves Ashkenazi Jews and is also known as the 'Tree of Life' synagogue.

== See also ==
- History of the Jews in Turkey
- List of synagogues in Turkey
