= Hemdat Israel Synagogue =

Synagogue in Istanbul, Turkey

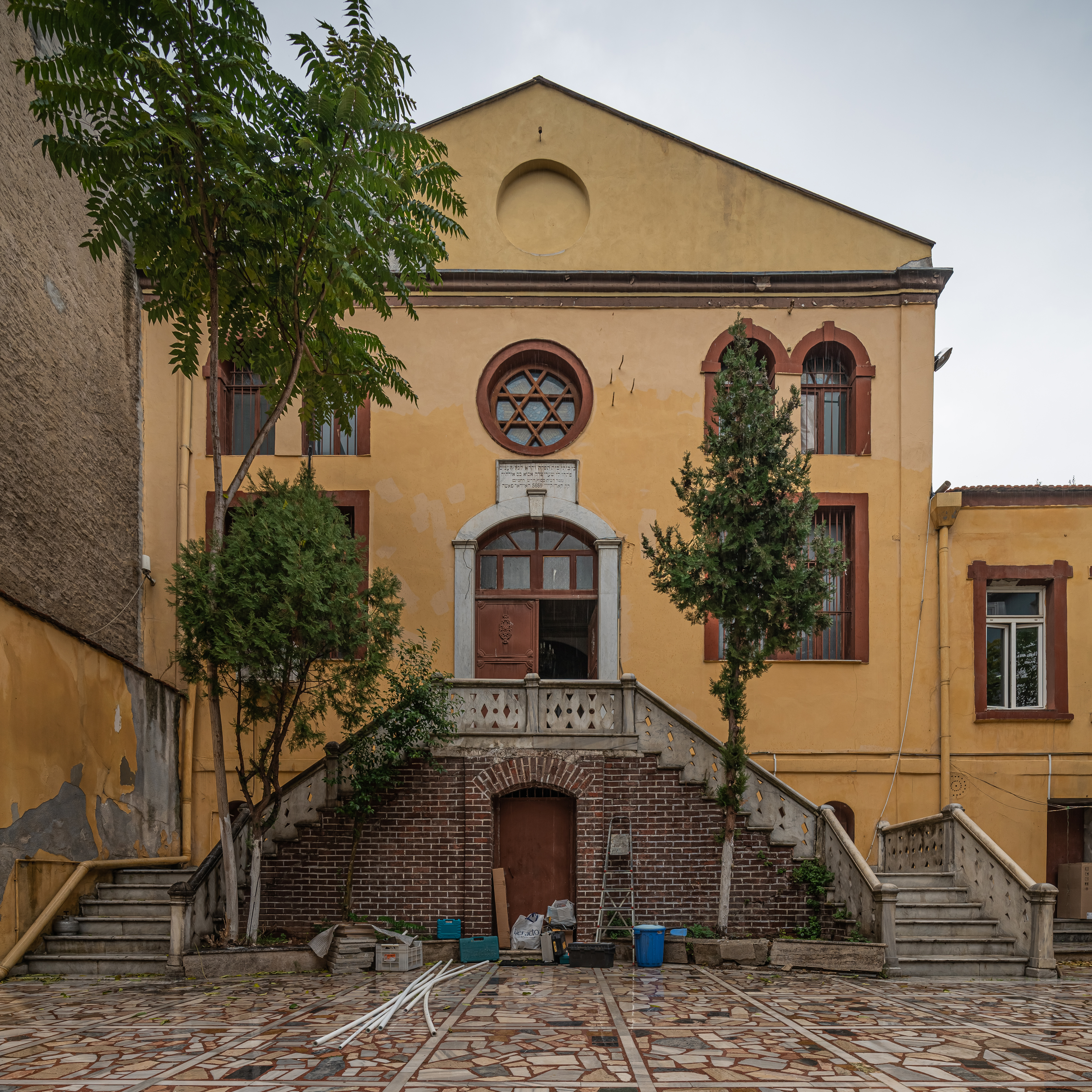
- The synagogue façade, in 2021

- Location of the synagogue in Istanbul

Religion
- Affiliation: Judaism
- Rite: Nusach Sefard (Eastern)
- Ecclesiastical or organizational status: Synagogue
- Status: Active

Location
- Location: Izzettin Street, Haydarpaşa, Kadıköy, Istanbul
- Country: Turkey
- Interactive map of Hemdat Israel Synagogue
- Coordinates: 40°59′41″N 29°01′38″E

Architecture
- Type: Synagogue architecture
- Completed: 1899
- Materials: Brick

The Hemdat Israel Synagogue is a Jewish congregation and synagogue, located on Izzettin Street, in the Yeldeğirmeni neighbourhood of the Jewish quarter of Haydarpaşa in Kadıköy, on the Asian side of Istanbul, Turkey.

Completed in 1899, visits to the synagogue are possible by contacting the Chief Rabbinate.

== Gallery ==
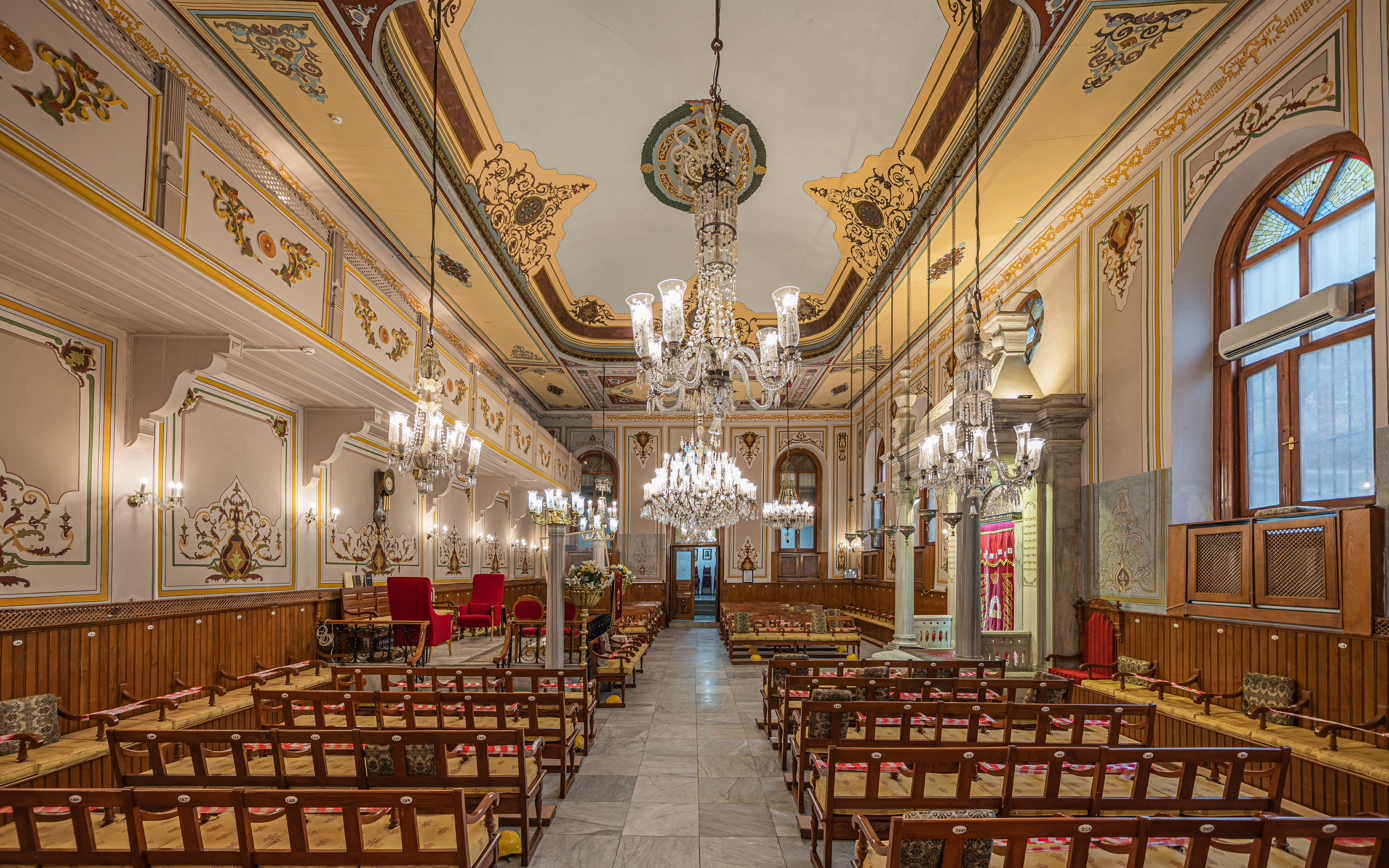
Interior view from the entrance

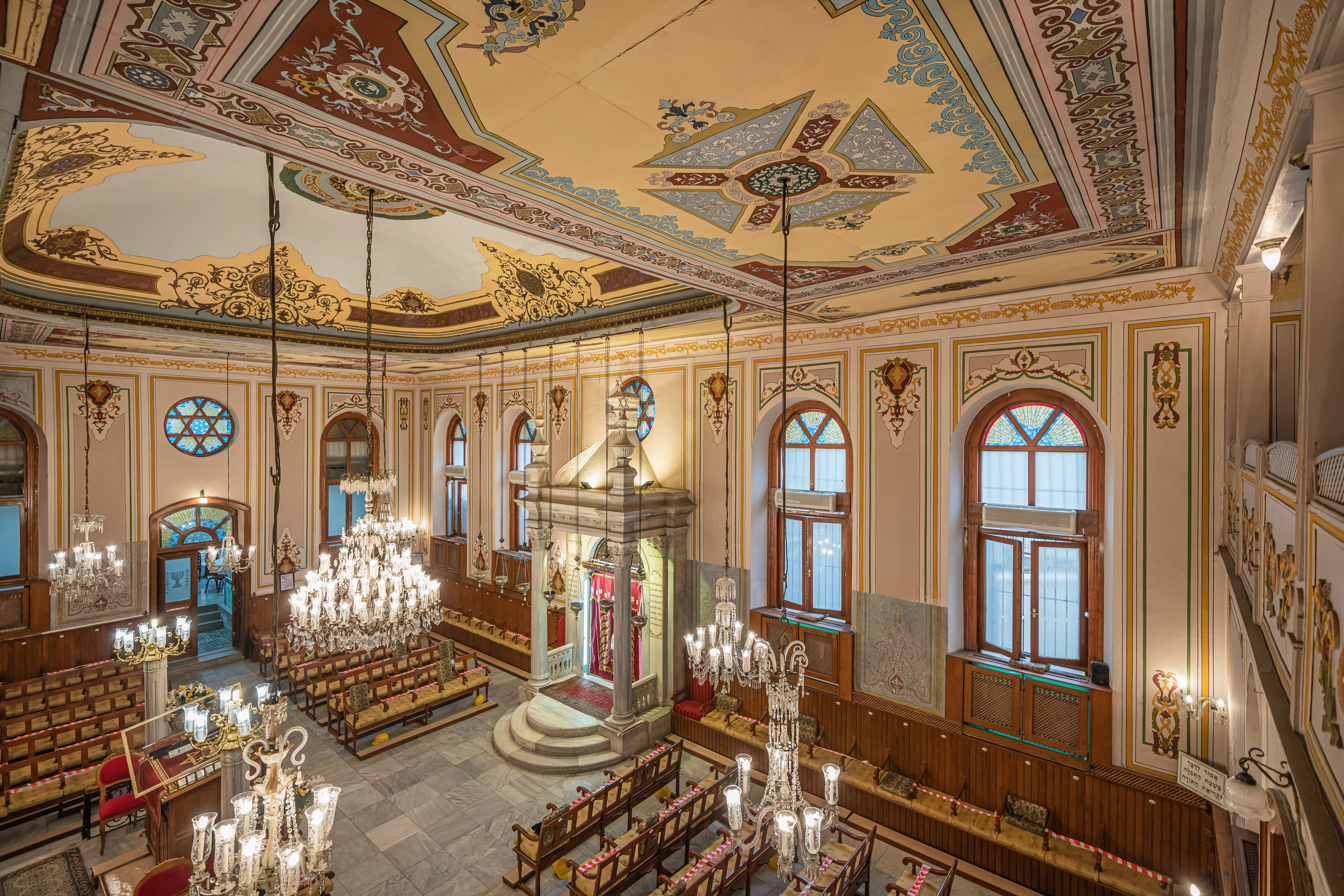
Interior view from the gallery

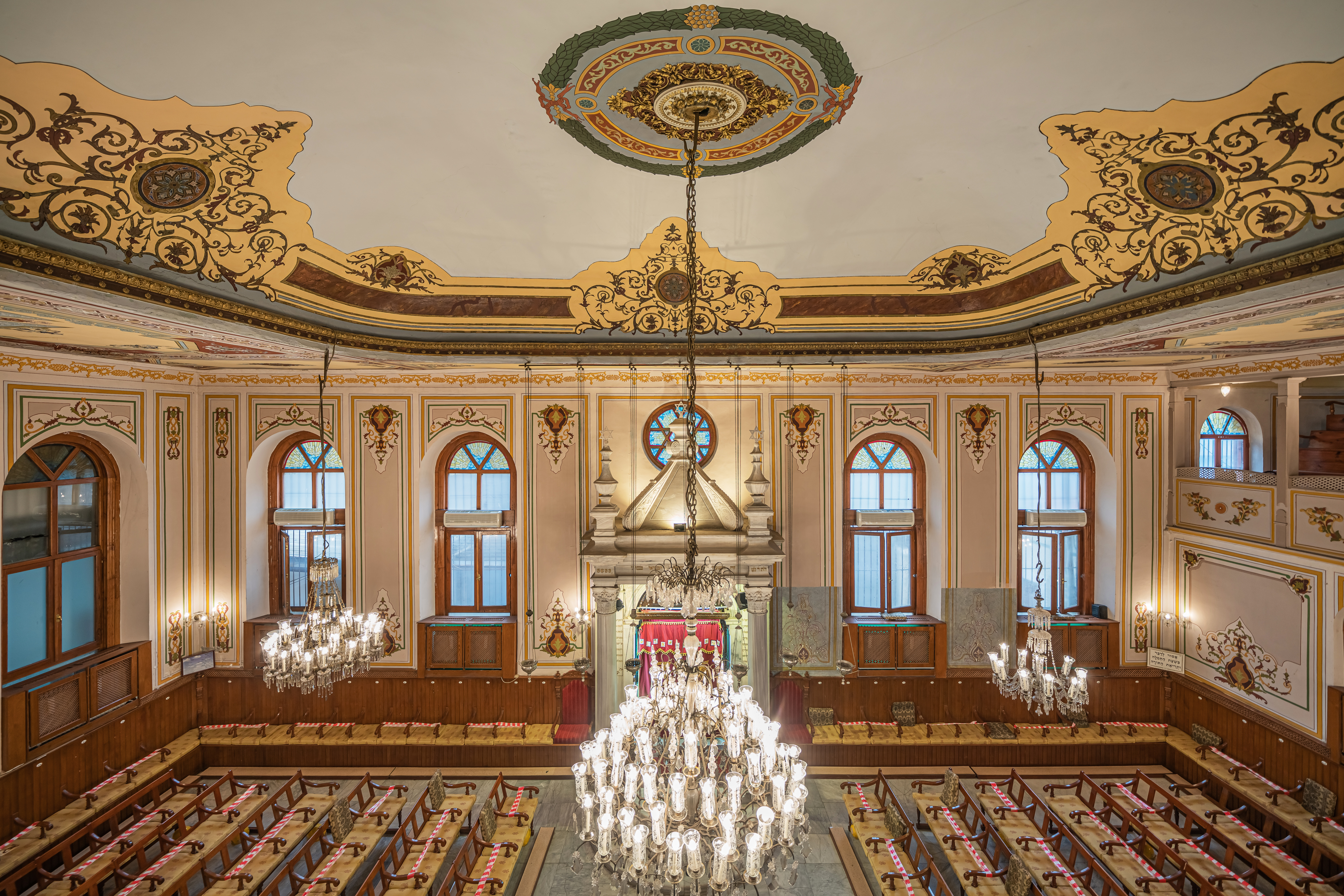
Interior view from the gallery

== See also ==
- History of the Jews in Turkey
- List of synagogues in Turkey
