= List of synagogues in Turkey =

This is a list of notable synagogues in Turkey.

== Istanbul ==
Name	Image	Founded	Location
Ahrida Synagogue		c. 1460	Fatih
Ashkenazi Synagogue		1900	Beyoğlu
Bakırköy Synagogue		19th century	Bakırköy
Bet Avraam Synagogue		1920s	Fatih
Bet Israel Synagogue		1920s	Şişli
Bet Nissim Synagogue		1840s	Üsküdar
Bet Yaakov Synagogue		1878	Üsküdar
Burgazada Synagogue		1968	Burgazada
Caddebostan Synagogue		1953	Kadıköy
Istipol Synagogue			Fatih
Etz Ahayim Synagogue			Beşiktaş
Hemdat Israel Synagogue		1899	Kadıköy
Hesed Le Avraam Synagogue		1920s	Büyükada
Italian Synagogue		19th century	Beyoğlu
Kal Kados, Corapci Han Synagogue		1880s	Fatih
Karaite Synagogue			Beyoğlu
Maalem Synagogue			Beyoğlu
Mayor Synagogue			Beyoğlu
Neve Shalom Synagogue		1951	Beyoğlu
Or Hadash Synagogue		1896	Beyoğlu
Tofre Begadim Synagogue		1894	Beyoğlu
Yanbol Synagogue		18th century	Fatih
Yeniköy Synagogue		1870s	Sarıyer
Zulfaris Synagogue (Jewish Museum of Turkey)		c. 1671	Beyoğlu

== İzmir ==
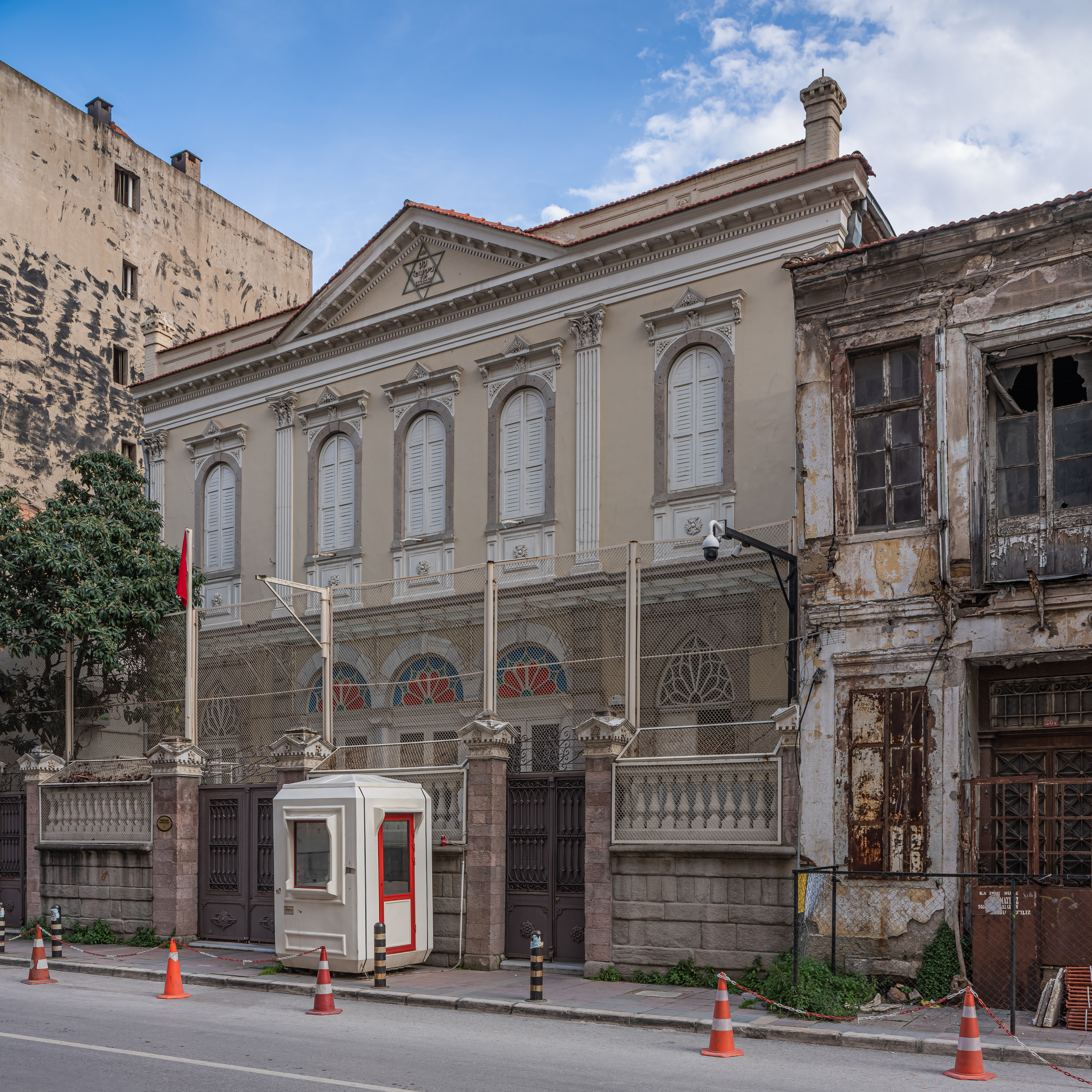
Bet Israel Synagogue is located in Karataş, İzmir.

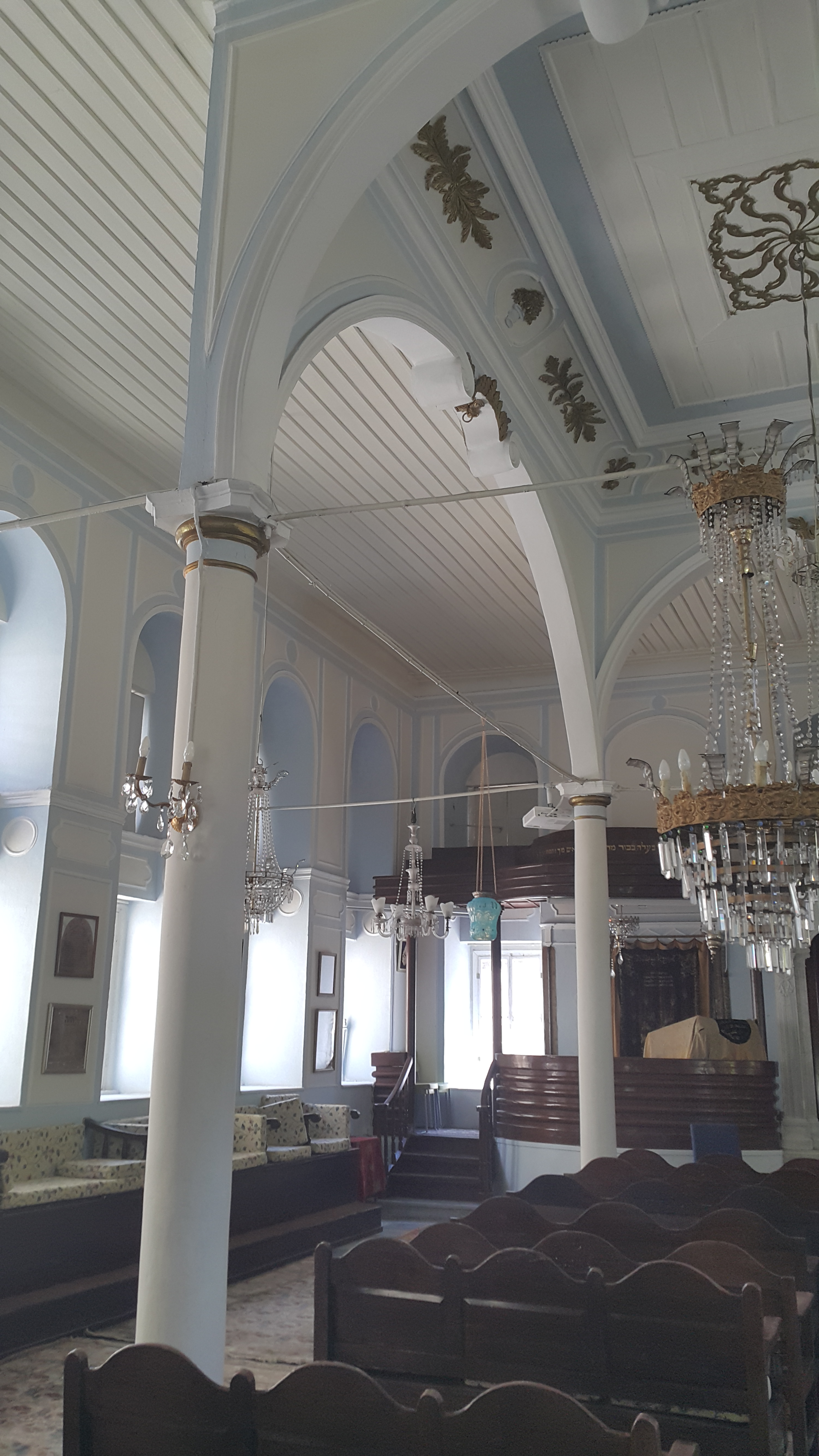
Signora Giveret Synagogue of İzmir

- Kemeraltı synagogues (list)
- Algazi Synagogue
- Ashkenazi Synagogue
- Aydınlı Shalom Synagogue
- Bet Israel Synagogue (İzmir)
- Beit-Hillel
- Bikurkholim Synagogue
- Etz-Hayyim Synagogue
- Los Foresteros Synagogue
- Hevra Synagogue
- Kahal Kadosh Synagogue
- Portugal Synagogue
- Rosh-Ha-Ar Synagogue
- Shaar Hashamayim Synagogue (İzmir)
- Signora Giveret Synagogue

== Adana ==
- Adana Synagogue

== Ankara ==
- Ankara Synagogue

== Bursa ==
- Gerush Synagogue
- Etz Ahayim Synagogue (Bursa)
- Mayor Synagogue (Bursa)

== Çanakkale ==
- Çanakkale Synagogue

== Edirne ==
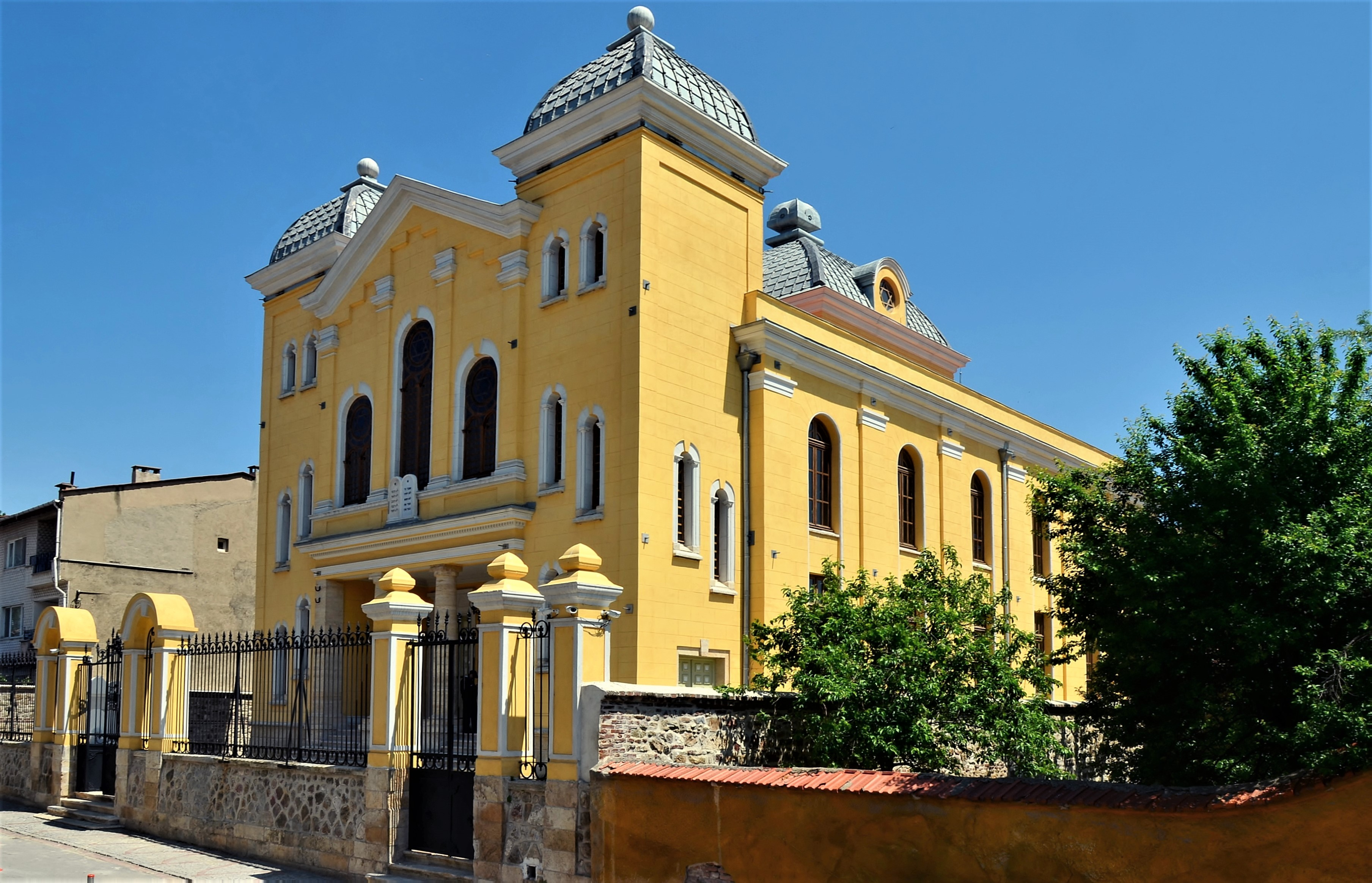
Grand Synagogue of Edirne

- Grand Synagogue of Edirne

== Gaziantep ==
- Gaziantep Synagogue in Gaziantep

== Kilis ==
- Kilis Synagogue in Kilis

== Hatay ==
- Antakya Synagogue in Hatay
- Iskenderun Synagogue in Hatay

== Manisa ==
- Sardis Synagogue

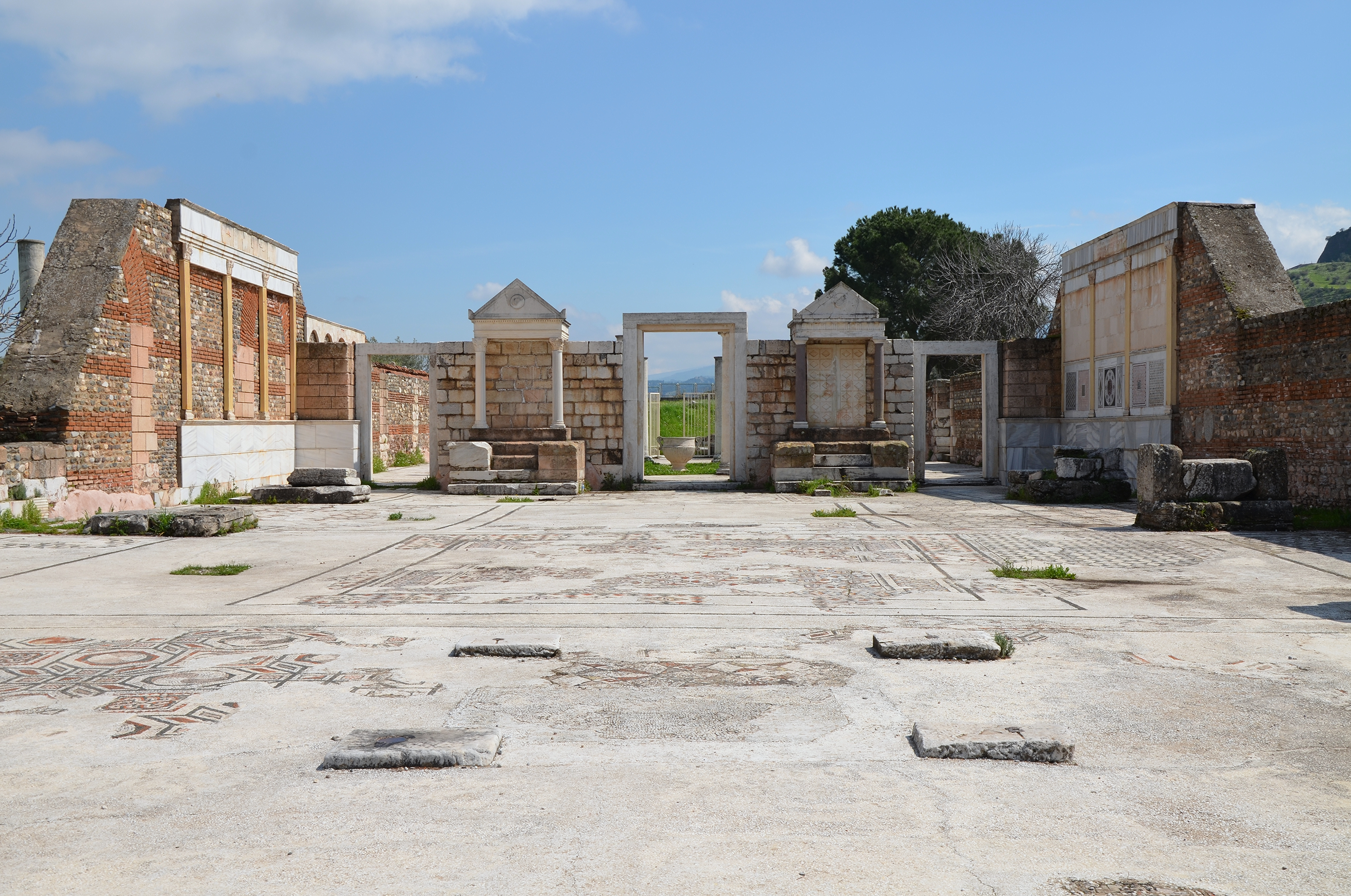
Sardis Synagogue

== See also ==
- History of the Jews in Turkey
- Dönmeh
- Jewish Museum of Turkey
- Israel–Turkey relations
- Ishak Haleva
- Religion in Turkey
- Pallache family
