= Antakya Synagogue =

Former synagogue in Antakya, Turkey

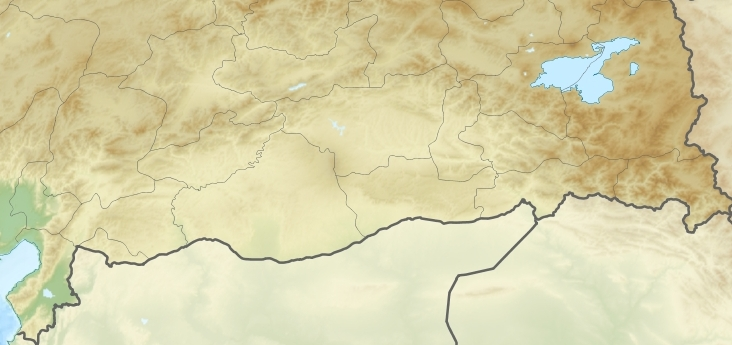
- Location of the former synagogue in southeast Turkey

Religion
- Affiliation: Judaism (former)
- Ecclesiastical or organizational status: Synagogue (1890–2023)
- Status: Abandoned

Location
- Location: 56 Kurtuluş Caddesi, Antakya, Hatay Province
- Country: Turkey
- Interactive map of Antakya Synagogue
- Coordinates: 36°12′01″N 36°09′52″E

Architecture
- Type: Synagogue architecture
- Completed: 1890
- Demolished: 2023 Turkey–Syria earthquakes
- Materials: Stone

The Antakya Synagogue is a former Jewish congregation and synagogue, located at 56 Kurtuluş Caddesi, in Antakya, in the Hatay Province of Turkey, near the border with Syria. Built in 1890, the synagogue was used as a place of worship until it was severely damaged in the 2023 Turkey–Syria earthquakes.

== History ==
The synagogue served the few remaining members of the once thriving, 2,300-year-old Jewish community of ancient Antioch (largely composed of descendants of Syrian Jews), which was one of the world's oldest Jewish communities, that by 2014, had shrunk to fewer than 20 members.

The building was erected in 1890. Because Antakya is north of Jerusalem, the synagogue is built with the Torah Ark on the southern wall in a semi-circular apse.

The synagogue was badly damaged in the 2023 Turkey–Syria earthquakes. The leaders of the Jewish community were also killed in the earthquake, and all 14 remaining members of the Jewish community were evacuated from Antakya and given shelter in Istanbul.

== See also ==
- History of the Jews in Turkey
- List of synagogues in Turkey
