= Gaziantep Synagogue =

Former synagogue in Gaziantep, Turkey

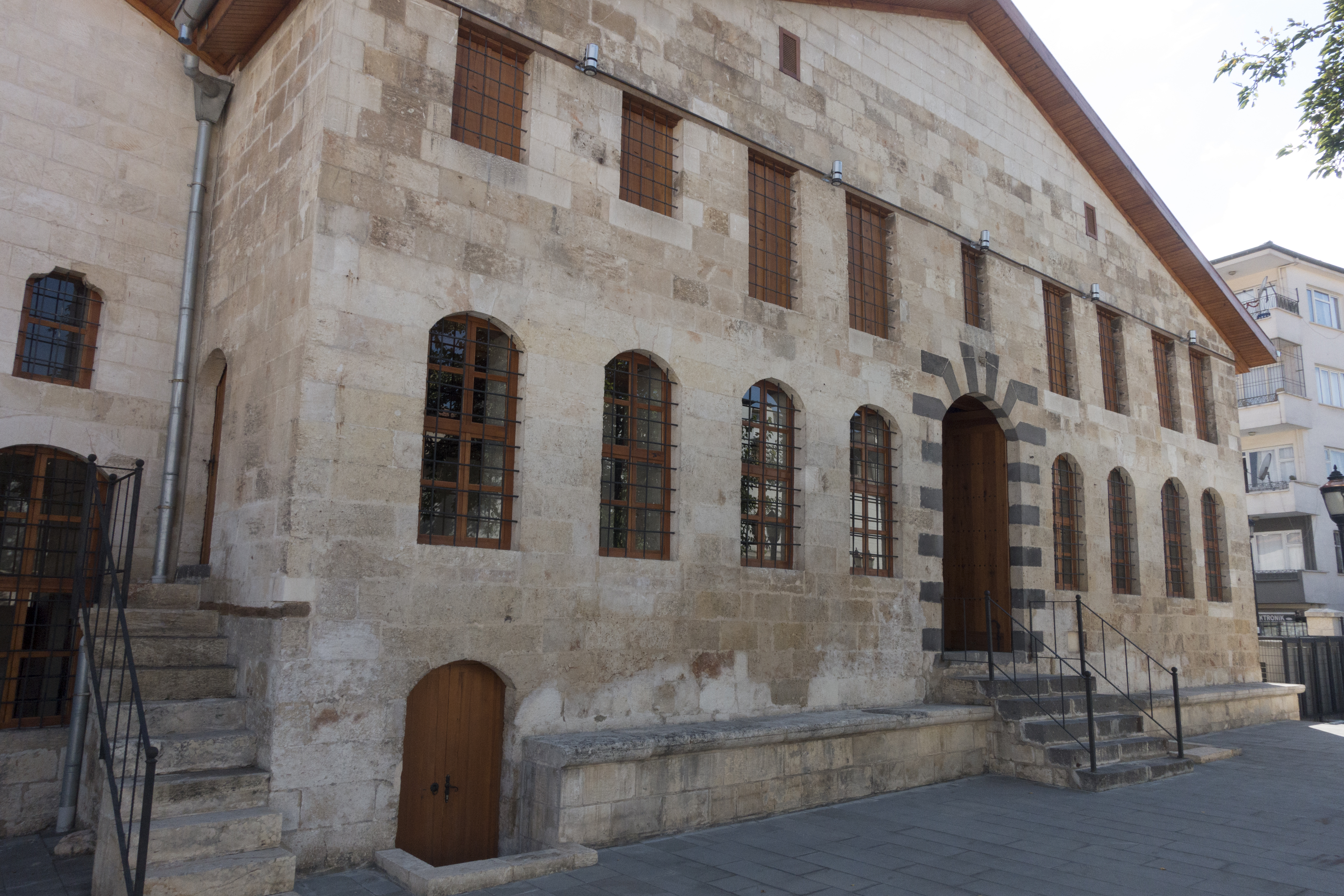
- The façade of the former synagogue, in 2014

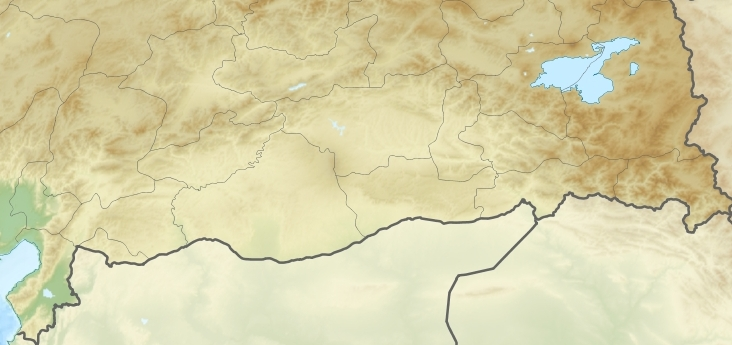
- Location of the former synagogue in southeast Turkey

Religion
- Affiliation: Judaism (former)
- Ecclesiastical or organizational status: Synagogue (1855–1975); Mikveh (since 2001)
- Status: Abandoned

Location
- Location: Karagöz Mah. 12, Çamurcu Sk., Gaziantep
- Country: Turkey
- Interactive map of Gaziantep Synagogue
- Coordinates: 37°03′51″N 37°22′54″E

Architecture
- Type: Synagogue architecture
- Style: Ottoman architecture
- Completed: 19th century
- Materials: Stone

The Gaziantep Synagogue, also known as the Great Synagogue of Gaziantep, is a former Jewish congregation and synagogue located in Gaziantep, in south-central Turkey. No longer used as a synagogue, the building is abandoned.

== History ==
The former synagogue closed after the last remaining members of Gaziantep's Jewish population left the city in the 1970s and was in a state of disrepair. Through the collaboration between the Jewish community in Turkey and the government, the synagogue was restored in 2012. In 2014 it was opened to visitors. In December 2019 a Hanukkah celebration with 200 people was held.

The synagogue is a two-story, stone building large enough to accommodate several hundred worshippers. The date of its construction is unknown.

== See also ==
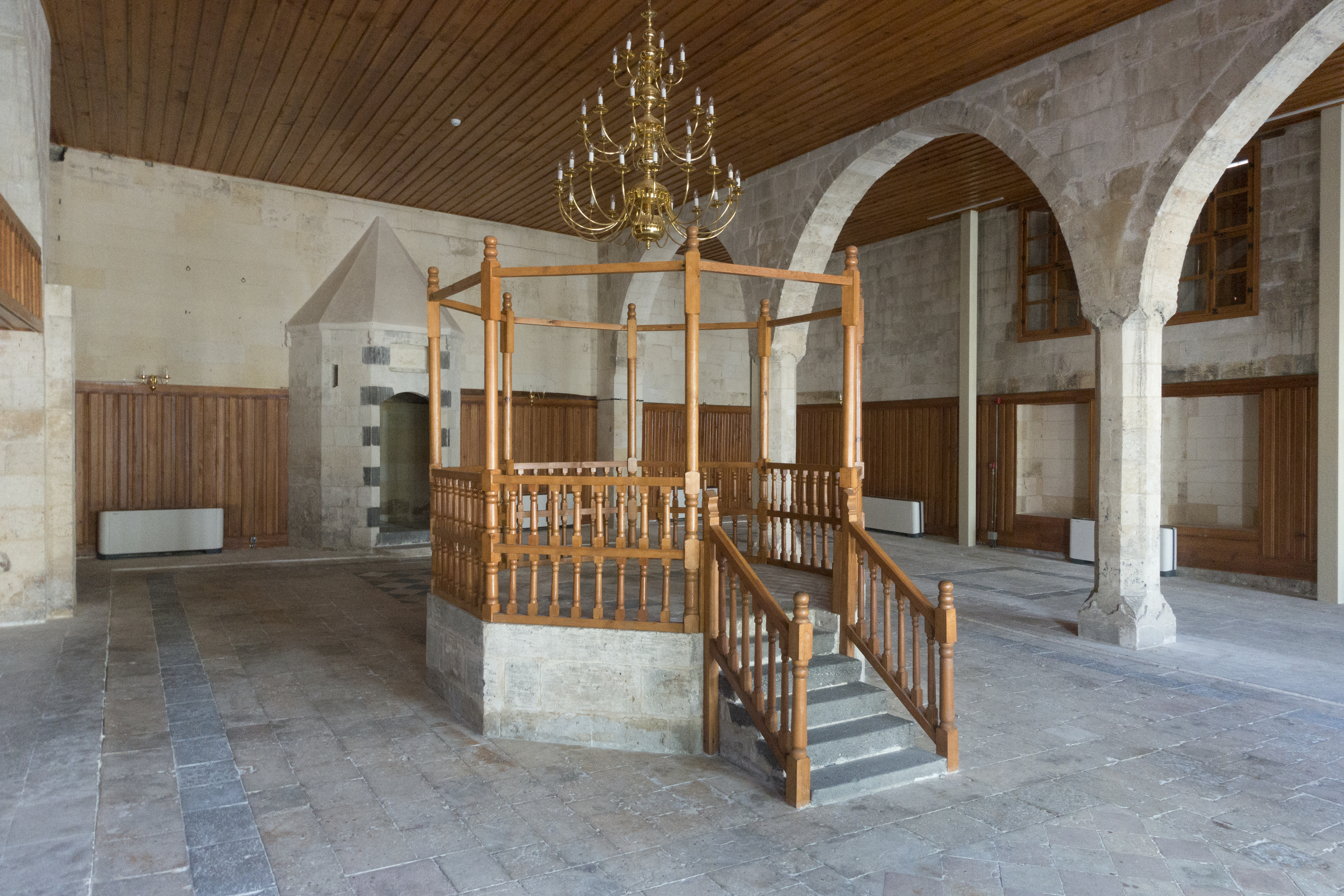
The empty synagogue

- History of the Jews in Turkey
- List of synagogues in Turkey
