= Ankara Synagogue =

Synagogue in Ankara, Turkey

- Turkish: Ankara Sinagogu
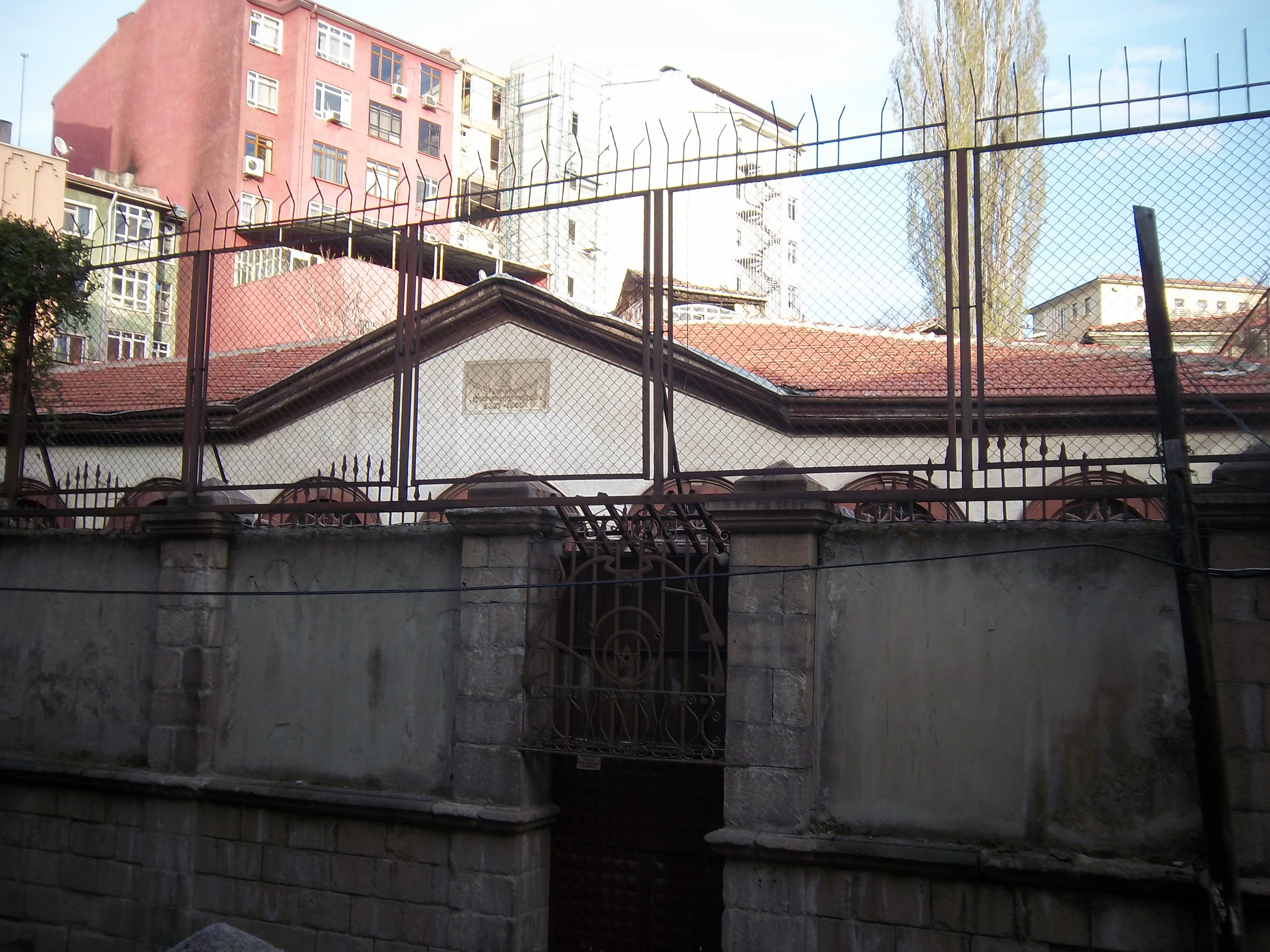
- Walled entrance to the synagogue, in 2015

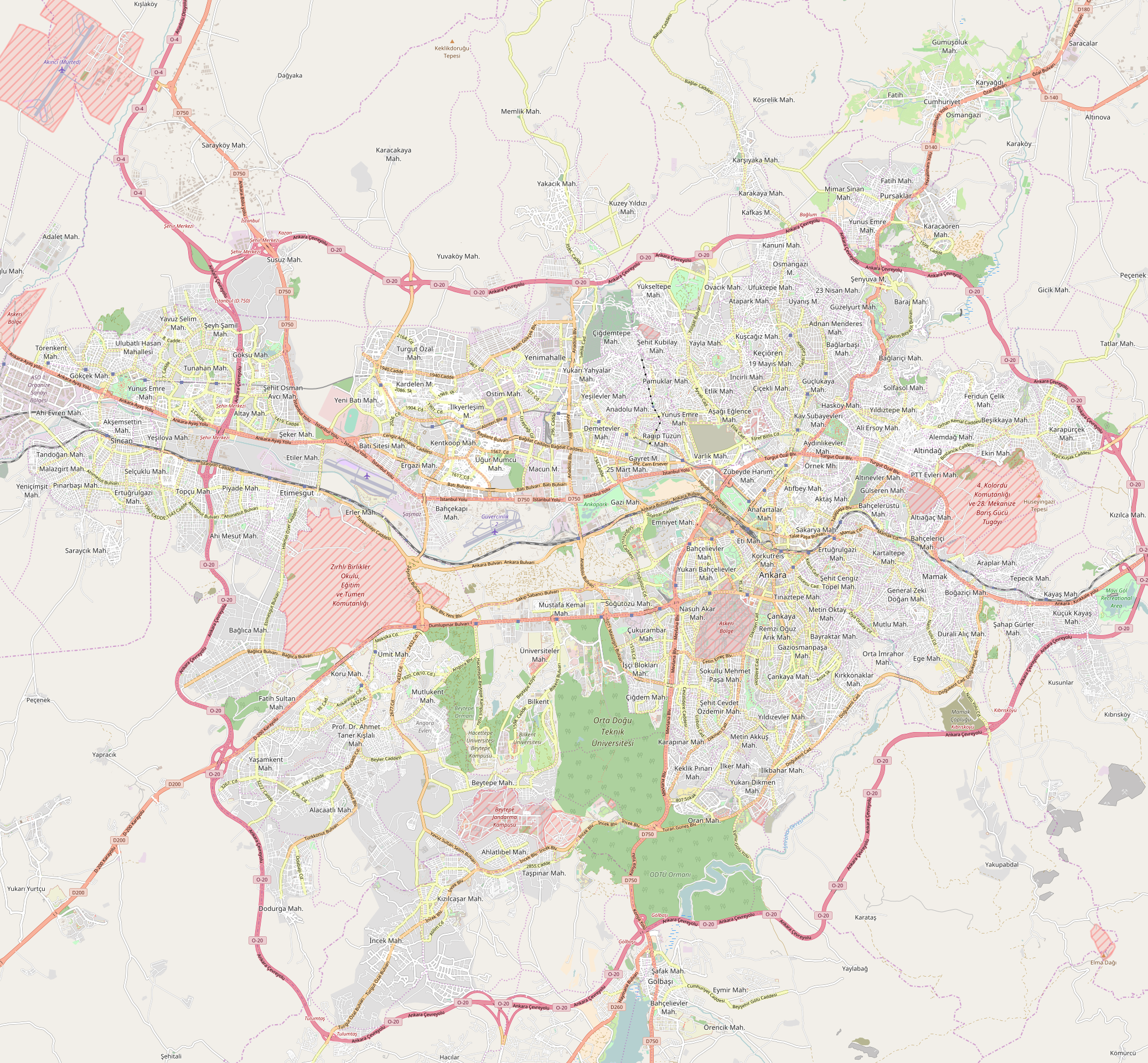
- Location of the synagogue in Ankara

Religion
- Affiliation: Judaism
- Ecclesiastical or organizational status: Synagogue
- Status: Active (seasonal)

Location
- Location: Birlik Street, Ulus, Ankara, Central Anatolia Region
- Country: Turkey
- Interactive map of Ankara Synagogue
- Coordinates: 39°56′08″N 32°51′38″E

Architecture
- Type: Synagogue architecture
- Established: 63 BCE (as a congregation)
- Completed: 1834

Specifications
- Capacity: 100 worshippers
- Materials: Stone

The Ankara Synagogue (Turkish: Ankara Sinagogu) is a Jewish congregation and synagogue located on Birlik Street, in Ankara, in the Central Anatolia Region of Turkey. Completed in 1834, the stone synagogue was built in Ulus, the tumbling old quarter of Turkey's capital. The synagogue was radically refurbished by an Italian architect in 1906. The historical building is kept closed most of the year except for the major days, as it cannot find the required number of congregation members for regular worship.

The congregation dates from 63 BCE.

== See also ==
- History of the Jews in Turkey
- List of synagogues in Turkey
