= Kal Kados, Corapci Han Synagogue =

Synagogue in Istanbul, Turkey

- Location of the synagogue in Istanbul

Religion
- Affiliation: Judaism
- Rite: Nusach Ashkenaz
- Ecclesiastical or organisational status: Synagogue
- Status: Active

Location
- Location: Mahmutpaşa Yokuşu Sk, Istanbul, Istanbul Province
- Country: Turkey
- Coordinates: 41°00′52″N 28°58′11″E

Architecture
- Type: Synagogue architecture
- Funded by: Count de Kamondo
- Completed: c. 1880s
- Materials: Brick

The Kal Kados, Corapci Han Synagogue, also known as the Kal Kadoş Çorapçı Han Synagogue, is a Jewish congregation and synagogue, located on Mahmutpaşa Yokuşu Sk, in Istanbul, in the Istanbul Province of Turkey.

Completed in the 1880s, the synagogue is located in a commercial building built by Russian Jews with the help of Count de Kamondo. The synagogue is open for daily prayers during weekdays.

== See also ==
- History of the Jews in Turkey
- List of synagogues in Turkey
