= Mayor Synagogue (Bursa) =

Former synagogue in Bursa, Turkey

- Turkish: Sinagoga Mayor
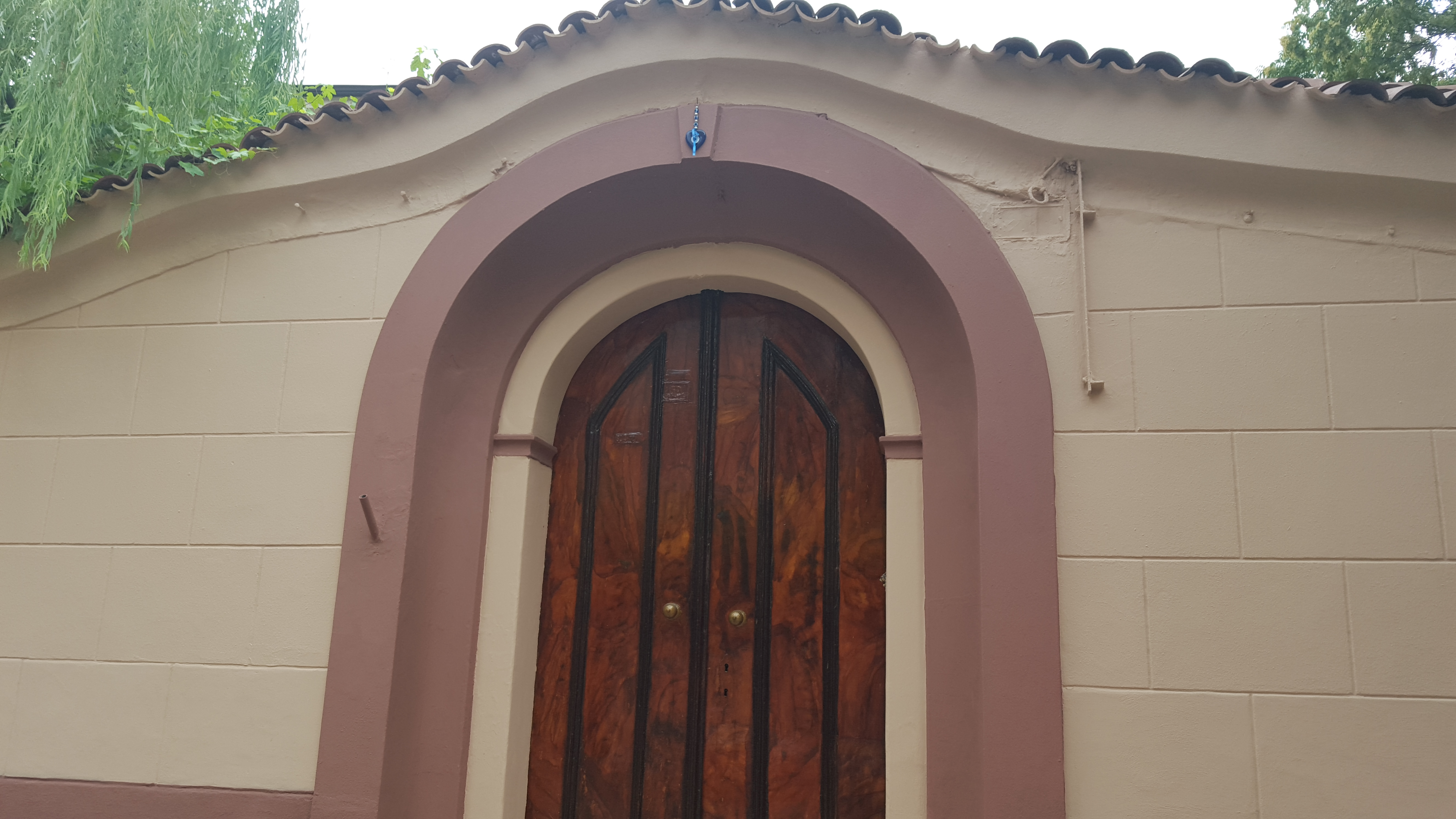
- The former synagogue, in 2015

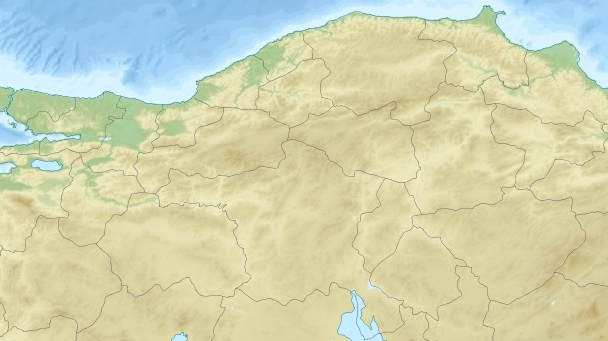
- Location of the former synagogue in northwest Turkey

Religion
- Affiliation: Judaism (former)
- Rite: Nusach Sefard
- Ecclesiastical or organisational status: Synagogue (1855–1975); Mikveh (since 2001)
- Status: Abandoned

Location
- Location: Arap Şükrü (Sakarya) Street, Bursa, Bursa Province
- Country: Turkey
- Coordinates: 40°13′45″N 29°05′30″E

Architecture
- Type: Synagogue architecture
- Completed: 15th or 16th centuries
- Materials: Stone

The Mayor Synagogue (Turkish: Sinagoga Mayor), or Synagogue Mejor, is a former Jewish congregation and synagogue located on Arap Şükrü (Sakarya) Street in Bursa, Turkey. No longer used as a synagogue, the building is used as a mikveh.

== History ==
The congregation was founded by Jews who settled in the Ottoman Empire after being expelled from Majorca. The present building was built in the 15th century or the late 16th century.

The synagogue was in regular use until 1975, when it was closed due to financial constraints. Researchers who visited in 1996 found it abandoned and in danger of demolition. However, according to the Turkish government, the building is still used for special events and for washing the dead.

The Geruş (or Gerush, meaning "Expulsion") Synagogue, still active, is also located in the same street.

== See also ==
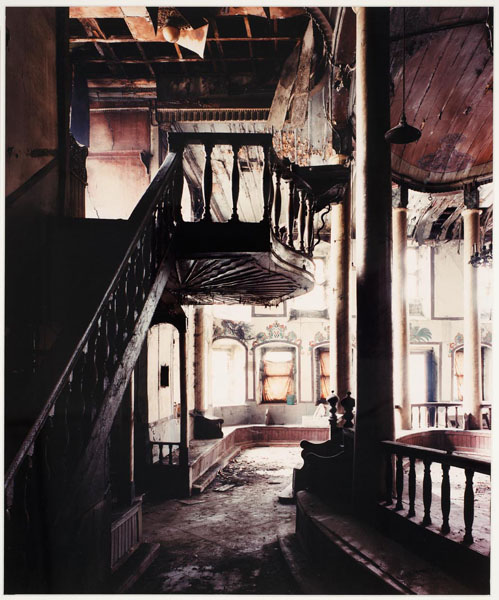
Interior of the former synagogue in 1996

- History of the Jews in Turkey
- List of synagogues in Turkey
