= Bet Avraam Synagogue =

Synagogue in Istanbul, Turkey

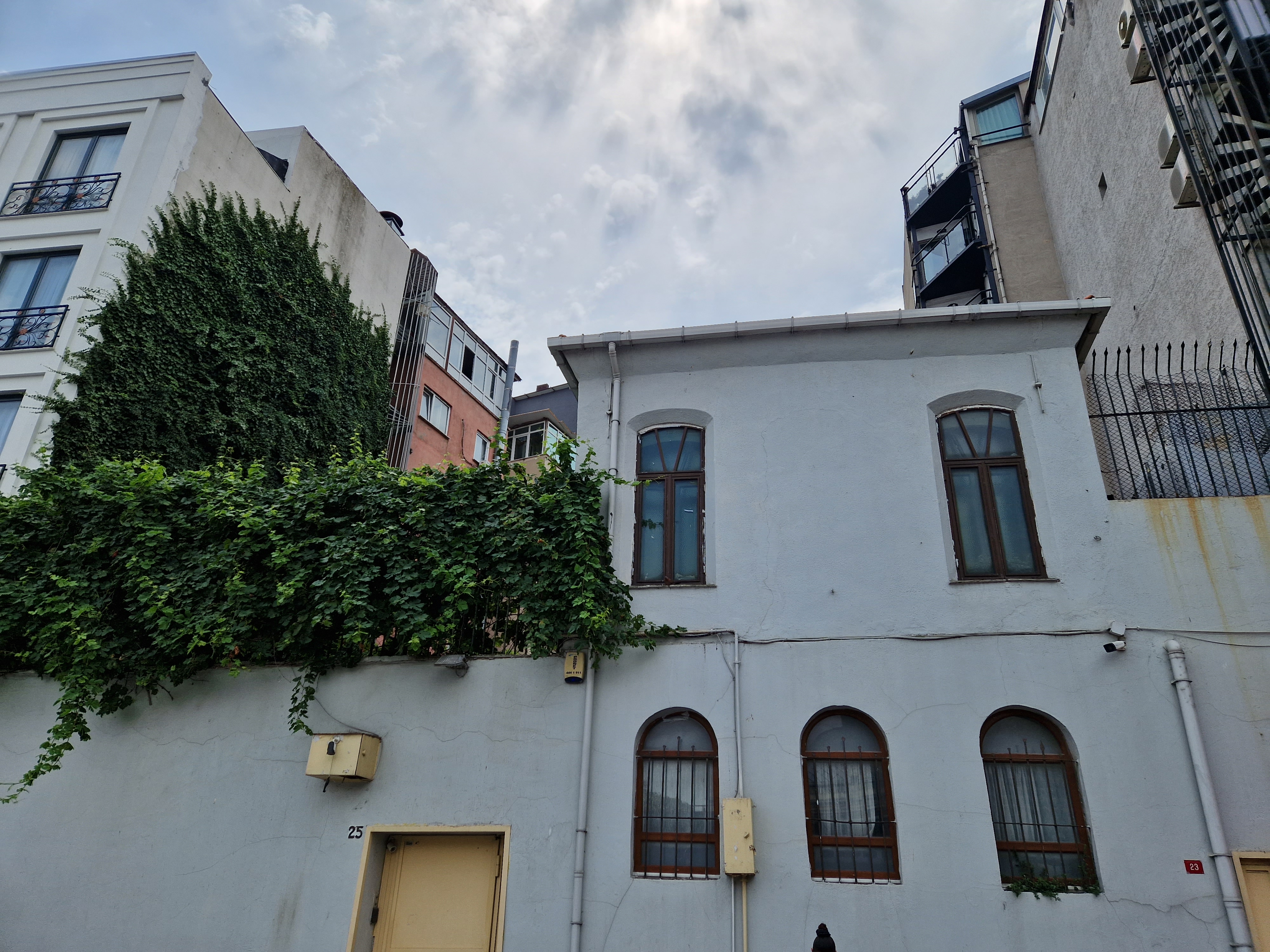
- The exterior of the synagogue

- Location of the synagogue in Istanbul

Religion
- Affiliation: Judaism
- Rite: Nusach Ashkenaz
- Ecclesiastical or organizational status: Synagogue
- Status: Active

Location
- Location: Sirkeci, Fatih, Istanbul, Istanbul Province
- Country: Turkey
- Interactive map of Bet Avraam Synagogue
- Coordinates: 41°00′11″N 28°58′56″E

Architecture
- Type: Synagogue architecture
- Completed: c. 1920; Renovations: 1945, 1955, 1971, 1983
- Materials: Brick

The Bet Avraam Synagogue, also known as the Hesed Beit Avraham Synagogue, is a Jewish congregation and synagogue, located behind the main train station, in Sirkeci, Istanbul, in the Istanbul Province of Turkey. It is the synagogue nearest to the Sultanahmet (Hippodrome) area and can be reached easily by foot. The synagogue is open, yet only open for Shabbat services.

== See also ==
- History of the Jews in Turkey
- List of synagogues in Turkey
