= Italian Synagogue (Istanbul) =

Synagogue in Istanbul, Turkey

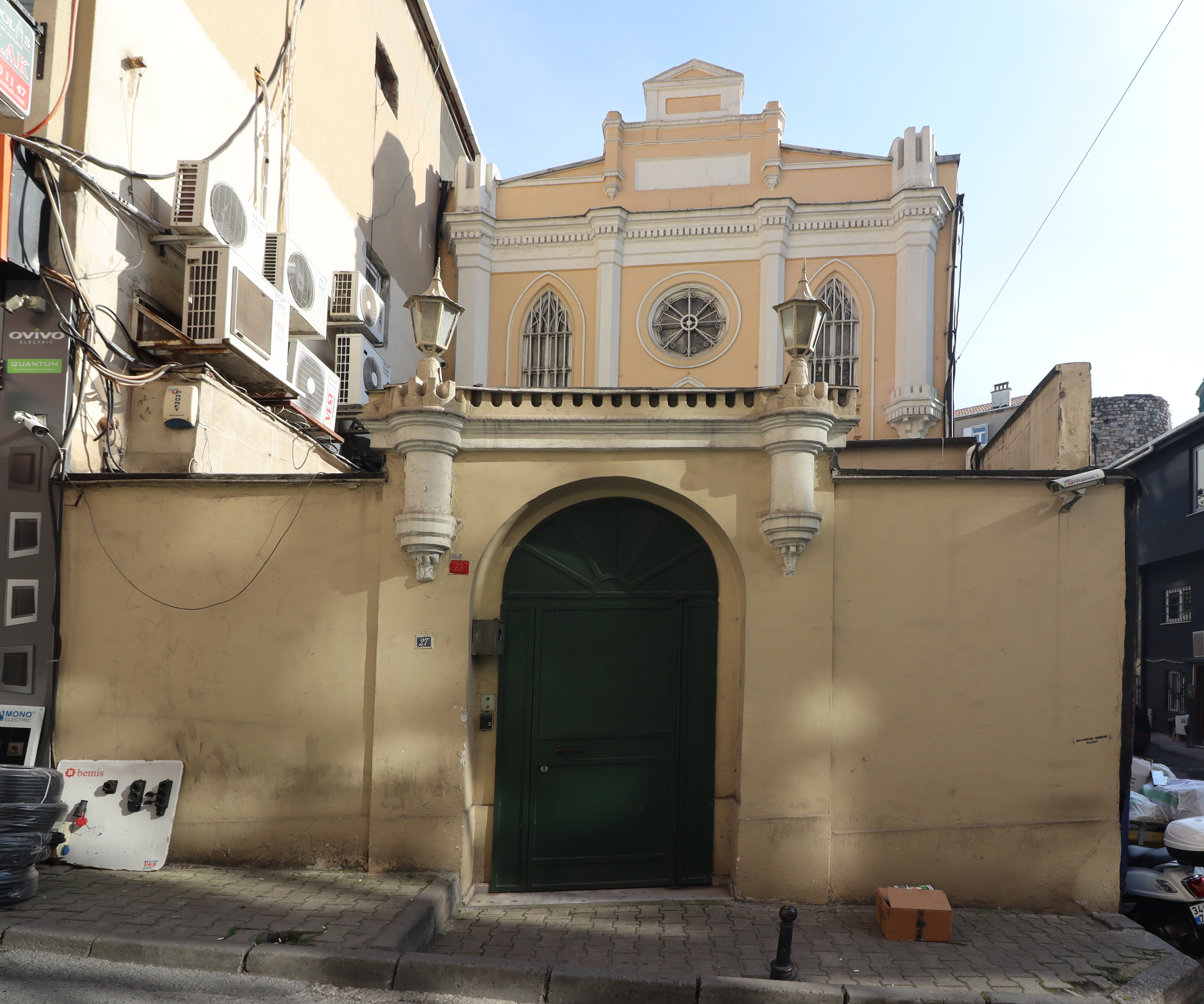
- The synagogue, in 2021

- Location of the synagogue in Istanbul

Religion
- Affiliation: Judaism
- Rite: Sephardi (Eastern)
- Ecclesiastical or organizational status: Synagogue
- Status: Active

Location
- Location: Şair Ziya Paşa Street, Beyoğlu, Istanbul, Istanbul Province
- Country: Turkey
- Interactive map of Italian Synagogue
- Coordinates: 41°01′32″N 28°58′21″E

Architecture
- Type: Synagogue architecture
- Style: Gothic Revival
- Established: 1885 (as a congregation)
- Completed: 1931
- Materials: Brick

The Italian Synagogue, also known as Kal de los Frankos, is a Jewish congregation and synagogue, located on Şair Ziya Paşa Street, north of the Golden Horn, in Beyoğlu, Istanbul, in the Istanbul Province of Turkey.

The congregation was established by the Italian Jewish community of Istanbul, (Comunità Israelitico-Italiana di Istanbul), in the 19th century. In 1931 the original building was demolished and a new Gothic Revival synagogue was built in its place.

== See also ==
- History of the Jews in Turkey
- List of synagogues in Turkey
