= Hesed Le Avraam Synagogue =

Synagogue in Istanbul, Turkey

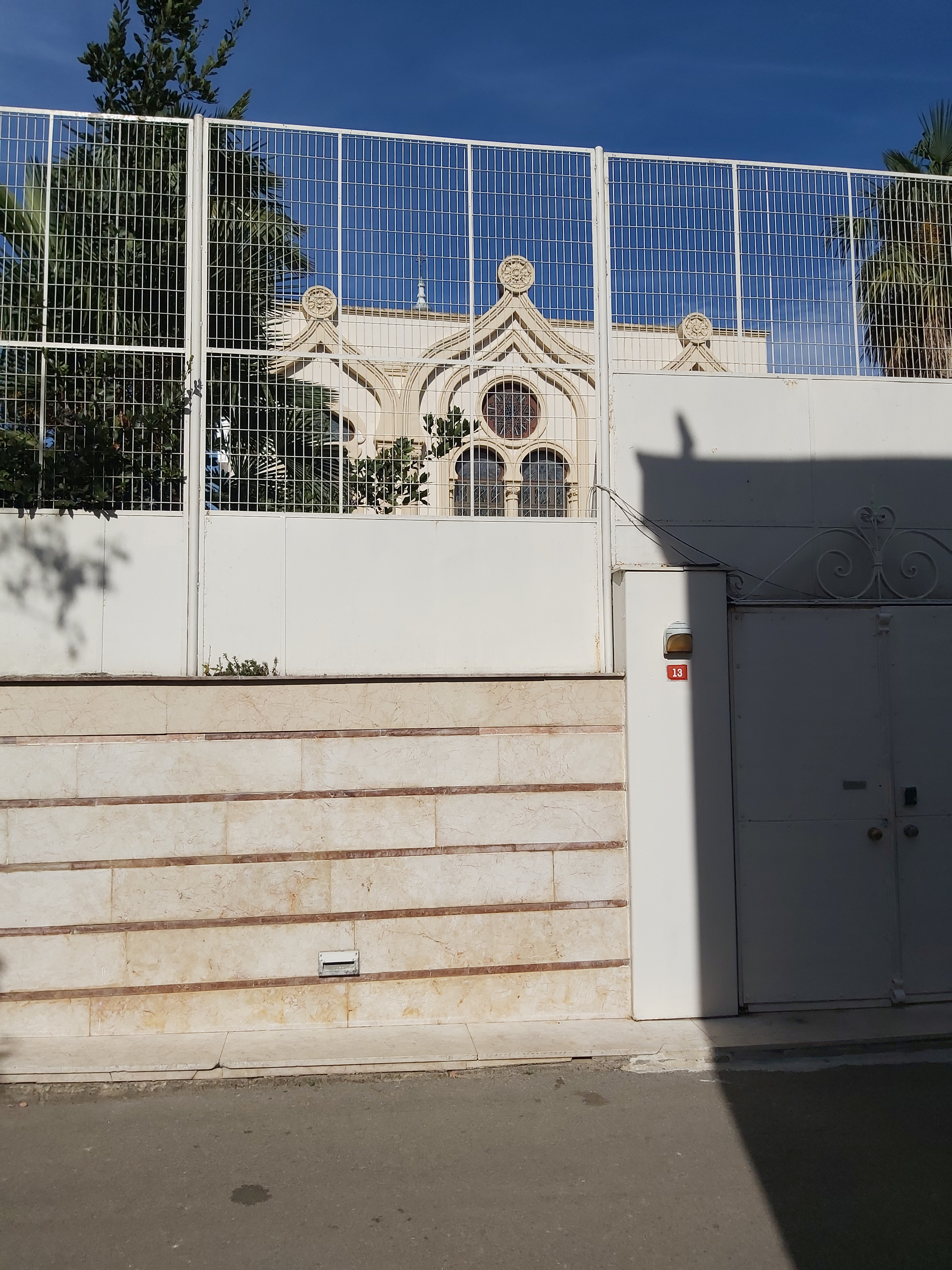
- The synagogue, in 2023

- Location of the synagogue in Istanbul

Religion
- Affiliation: Judaism
- Rite: Nusach Ashkenaz
- Ecclesiastical or organisational status: Synagogue
- Status: Active

Location
- Location: Sirkeci, Büyükada, Adalar, Istanbul, Istanbul Province
- Country: Turkey
- Coordinates: 40°52′20″N 29°08′05″E

Architecture
- Type: Synagogue architecture
- Completed: c. 1920s; 1960 (renovations)
- Materials: Brick

The Hesed Le Avraam Synagogue, also known as the Büyükada Synagogue or the Hesed Beit Avraham Synagogue, is a Jewish congregation and synagogue, located in the Sirkeci area of Büyükada, in the Adalar district of Istanbul, in the Istanbul Province of Turkey.

Completed in c. 1920s, the synagogue is open for services only during summer months, like the other synagogues of the Princes' Islands.

== See also ==
- History of the Jews in Turkey
- List of synagogues in Turkey
