= Burgazada Synagogue =

Synagogue in Istanbul, Turkey

- Location of the synagogue in Istanbul

Religion
- Affiliation: Judaism
- Rite: Nusach Sefard
- Ecclesiastical or organizational status: Synagogue
- Status: Active

Location
- Location: Burgazada, Princes' Islands, Istanbul, Istanbul Province
- Country: Turkey
- Interactive map of Burgazada Synagogue
- Coordinates: 40°52′50″N 29°04′09″E

Architecture
- Type: Synagogue architecture
- Completed: 1968; 1994 (renovations)
- Materials: Brick

The Burgazada Synagogue, also known as the Ohel Yaakov Synagogue, is a Jewish congregation and synagogue, located on Burgazada, in the Princes' Islands, off Istanbul, in the Istanbul Province of Turkey.

There were few Jewish families in the 1950s in Burgaz (Antigone). By the 1960s, the need to have a synagogue arose and permission was granted in 1968 to build one. It is open for services only during summer months, like the other synagogues of the Prince Islands.

== See also ==
- History of the Jews in Turkey
- List of synagogues in Turkey
