= Jewish culture =

Culture of Jews and Judaism

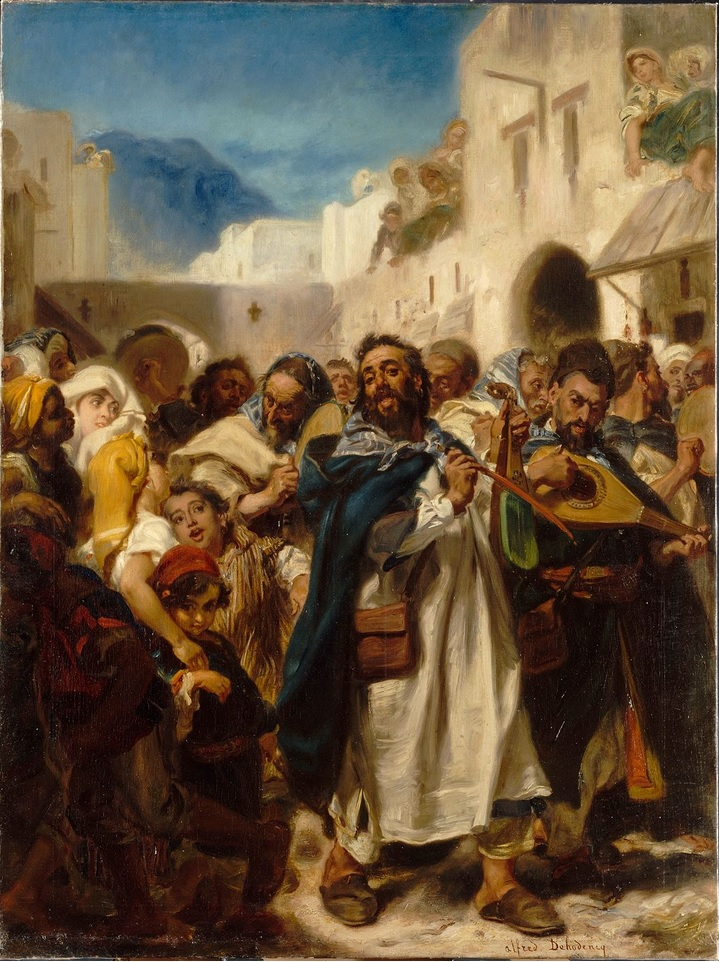
Jewish festival in Tétouan, Morocco, 1865

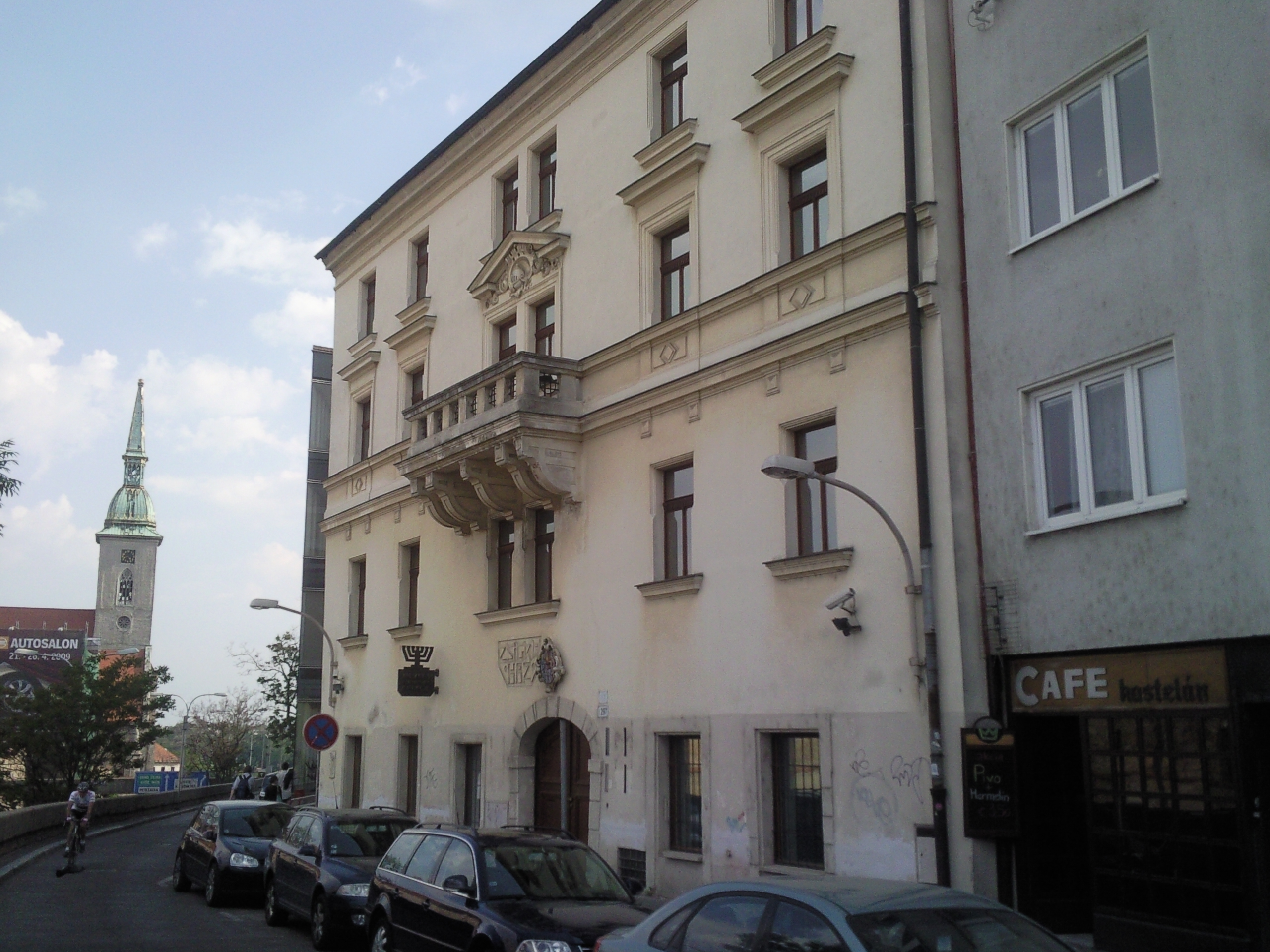
Museum of Jewish culture in Bratislava

Jewish culture is the culture of the Jewish people, from its formation in ancient times until the current age. Judaism itself is not simply a faith-based religion, but an orthopraxy and ethnoreligion, pertaining to deed, practice, and identity. Jewish culture covers many aspects, including religion and worldviews, literature, media, and cinema, art and architecture, cuisine and traditional dress, attitudes to gender, marriage, family, social customs and lifestyles, music and dance. Some elements of Jewish culture come from within Judaism, others from the interaction of Jews with host populations, and others still from the inner social and cultural dynamics of the community. Before the 18th century, religion dominated virtually all aspects of Jewish life, and infused culture. Since the advent of secularization, wholly secular Jewish culture emerged likewise.

== History ==
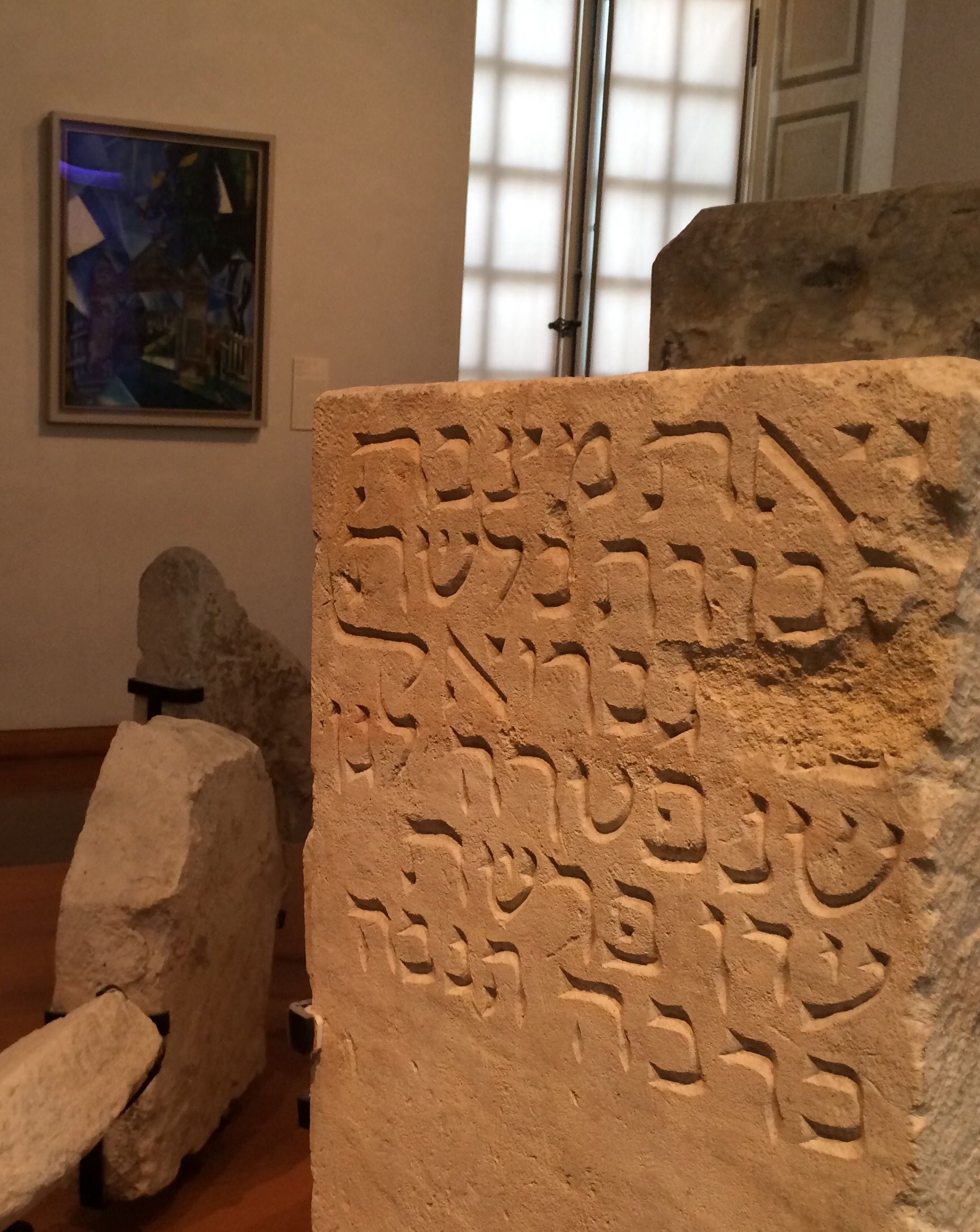
Tombstones from a Jewish cemetery, 13th century, Paris

There has not been a political unity of Jewish society since the united monarchy. Since then Israelite populations were always geographically dispersed (see Jewish diaspora), so that by the 19th century, the Ashkenazi Jews were mainly located in Eastern and Central Europe; the Sephardi Jews were largely spread among various communities which lived in the Mediterranean region; Mizrahi Jews were primarily spread throughout Western Asia; and other populations of Jews lived in the Caucasus, Crimea, Central Asia, Ethiopia, and India. (See Jewish ethnic divisions.)

While there has been communication and traffic between these Jewish communities, many Sephardic exiles blended into the Ashkenazi communities which existed in Central Europe following the Spanish Inquisition; many Ashkenazim migrated to the Ottoman Empire, giving rise to the characteristic Syrian-Jewish family name "Ashkenazi"; Iraqi-Jewish traders formed a distinct Jewish community in India; to some degree, many of these Jewish populations were cut off from the cultures which surrounded them by ghettoization, Muslim laws of dhimma, and the traditional discouragement of contact between Jews and members of polytheistic populations by their religious leaders.

Medieval Jewish communities in Eastern Europe continued to display distinct cultural traits over the centuries. Despite the universalist leanings of the Enlightenment (and its echo within Judaism in the Haskalah movement), many Yiddish-speaking Jews in Eastern Europe continued to see themselves as forming a distinct national group — " 'am yehudi", from the Biblical Hebrew – but, adapting this idea to Enlightenment values, they assimilated the concept as that of an ethnic group whose identity did not depend on religion, which under Enlightenment thinking fell under a separate category.

Constantin Măciucă writes of the existence of "a differentiated but not isolated Jewish spirit" permeating the culture of Yiddish-speaking Jews. This was only intensified as the rise of Romanticism amplified the sense of national identity across Europe generally. Thus, for example, members of the General Jewish Labour Bund in the late 19th and early 20th centuries were generally non-religious, and one of the historical leaders of the Bund was the child of converts to Christianity, though not a practicing or believing Christian himself.

The Haskalah combined with the Jewish Emancipation movement under way in Central and Western Europe to create an opportunity for Jews to enter secular society. At the same time, pogroms in Eastern Europe provoked a surge of migration, in large part to the United States, where some 2 million Jewish immigrants resettled between 1880 and 1920. By 1931, shortly before The Holocaust, 92% of the World's Jewish population was Ashkenazi in origin. Secularism originated in Europe as series of movements that militated for a new, heretofore unheard-of concept called "secular Judaism". For these reasons, much of what is thought of by English-speakers and, to a lesser extent, by non-English-speaking Europeans as "secular Jewish culture" is, in essence, the Jewish cultural movement that evolved in Central and Eastern Europe, and subsequently brought to North America by immigrants. During the 1940s, the Holocaust uprooted and destroyed most of the Jewish communities living in much of Europe. This, in combination with the creation of the State of Israel and the consequent Jewish exodus from Arab lands, resulted in a further geographic shift.

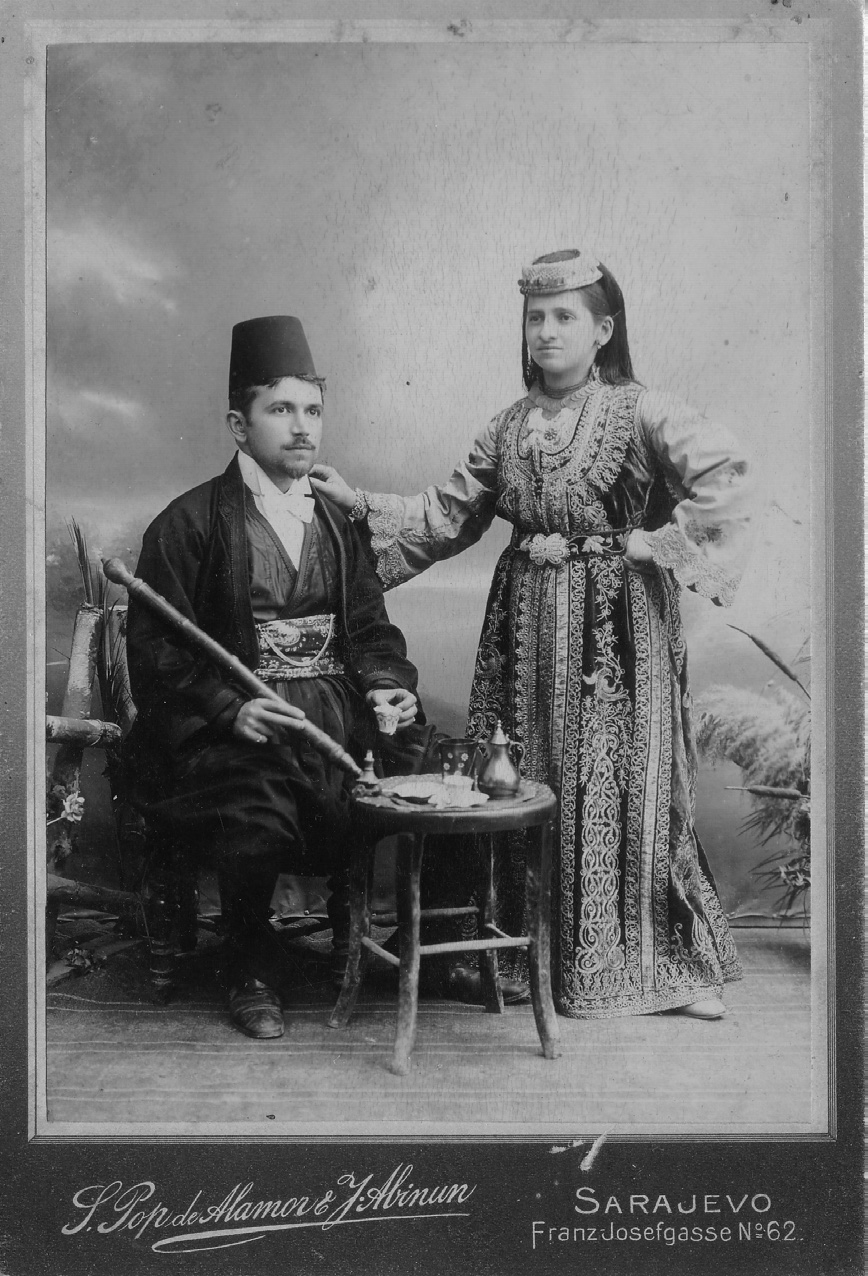
Sephardi Jewish couple from Sarajevo in traditional clothing. Photo taken in 1900.

Defining secular culture among those who practice traditional Judaism is difficult, because the entire culture is, by definition, entwined with religious traditions: the idea of separate ethnic and religious identity is foreign to the Hebrew tradition of an " 'am yisrael". (This is particularly true for Orthodox Judaism.) Gary Tobin, head of the Institute for Jewish and Community Research, said of traditional Jewish culture:

The dichotomy between religion and culture doesn't really exist. Every religious attribute is filled with culture; every cultural act filled with religiosity. Synagogues themselves are great centers of Jewish culture. After all, what is life really about? Food, relationships, enrichment ... So is Jewish life. So many of our traditions inherently contain aspects of culture. Look at the Passover Seder — it's essentially great theater. Jewish education and religiosity bereft of culture is not as interesting.

Yaakov Malkin, Professor of Aesthetics and Rhetoric at Tel Aviv University and the founder and academic director of Meitar College for Judaism as Culture in Jerusalem, writes:

Today very many secular Jews take part in Jewish cultural activities, such as celebrating Jewish holidays as historical and nature festivals, imbued with new content and form, or marking life-cycle events such as birth, bar/bat mitzvah, marriage, and mourning in a secular fashion. They come together to study topics pertaining to Jewish culture and its relation to other cultures, in havurot, cultural associations, and secular synagogues, and they participate in public and political action coordinated by secular Jewish movements, such as the former movement to free Soviet Jews, and movements to combat pogroms, discrimination, and religious coercion. Jewish secular humanistic education inculcates universal moral values through classic Jewish and world literature and through organizations for social change that aspire to ideals of justice and charity.

In North America, the secular and cultural Jewish movements are divided into three umbrella organizations: the Society for Humanistic Judaism (SHJ), the Congress of Secular Jewish Organizations (CSJO), and The Workers Circle.

== Philosophy and religion ==
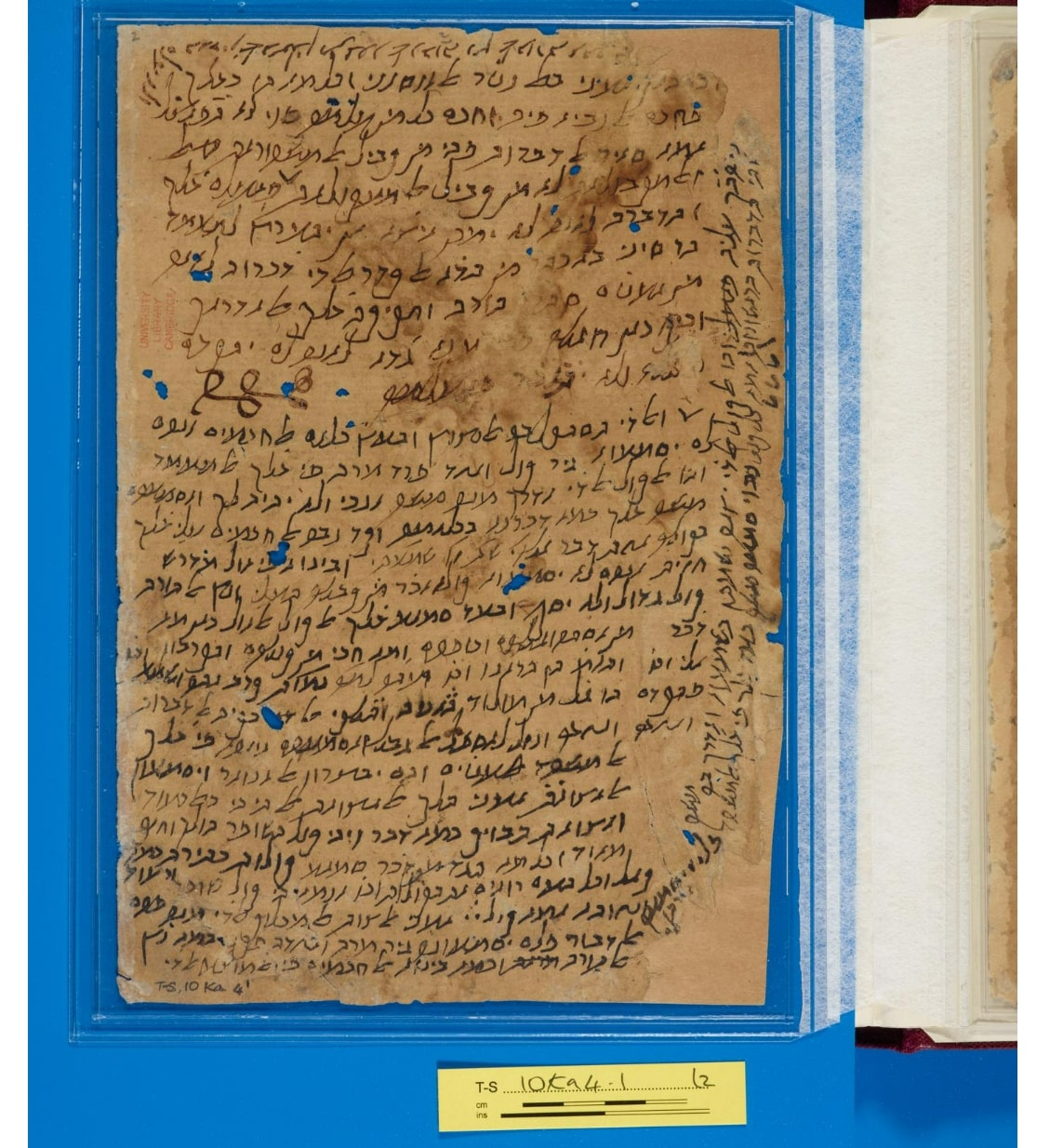
The Guide for the Perplexed, Maimonides (circa 1190)

Jewish philosophy includes all philosophy carried out by Jews, or in relation to the religion of Judaism. The Jewish philosophy is extended over several main eras in Jewish history, including the ancient and biblical era, medieval era and modern era (see Haskalah).

The ancient Jewish philosophy is expressed in the bible. According to Prof. Israel Efros, the principles of the Jewish philosophy start in the bible, where the foundations of the Jewish monotheistic beliefs can be found, such as the belief in one god, the separation of god and the world and nature (as opposed to Pantheism) and the creation of the world. Other biblical writings that associated with philosophy are Psalms that contains invitations to admire the wisdom of God through his works; from this, some scholars suggest, Judaism harbors a Philosophical under-current and Ecclesiastes that is often considered to be the only genuine philosophical work in the Hebrew Bible; its author seeks to understand the place of human beings in the world and life's meaning. Other writings related to philosophy can be found in the Deuterocanonical books such as Sirach and Book of Wisdom.

During the Hellenistic era, Hellenistic Judaism aspired to combine Jewish religious tradition with elements of Greek culture and philosophy. The philosopher Philo used philosophical allegory to attempt to fuse and harmonize Greek philosophy with Jewish philosophy. His work attempts to combine Plato and Moses into one philosophical system. He developed an allegoric approach of interpreting holy scriptures (the bible), in contrast to (old-fashioned) literally interpretation approaches. His allegorical exegesis was important for several Christian Church Fathers and some scholars hold that his concept of the Logos as God's creative principle influenced early Christology. Other scholars, however, deny direct influence but say both Philo and Early Christianity borrow from a common source.

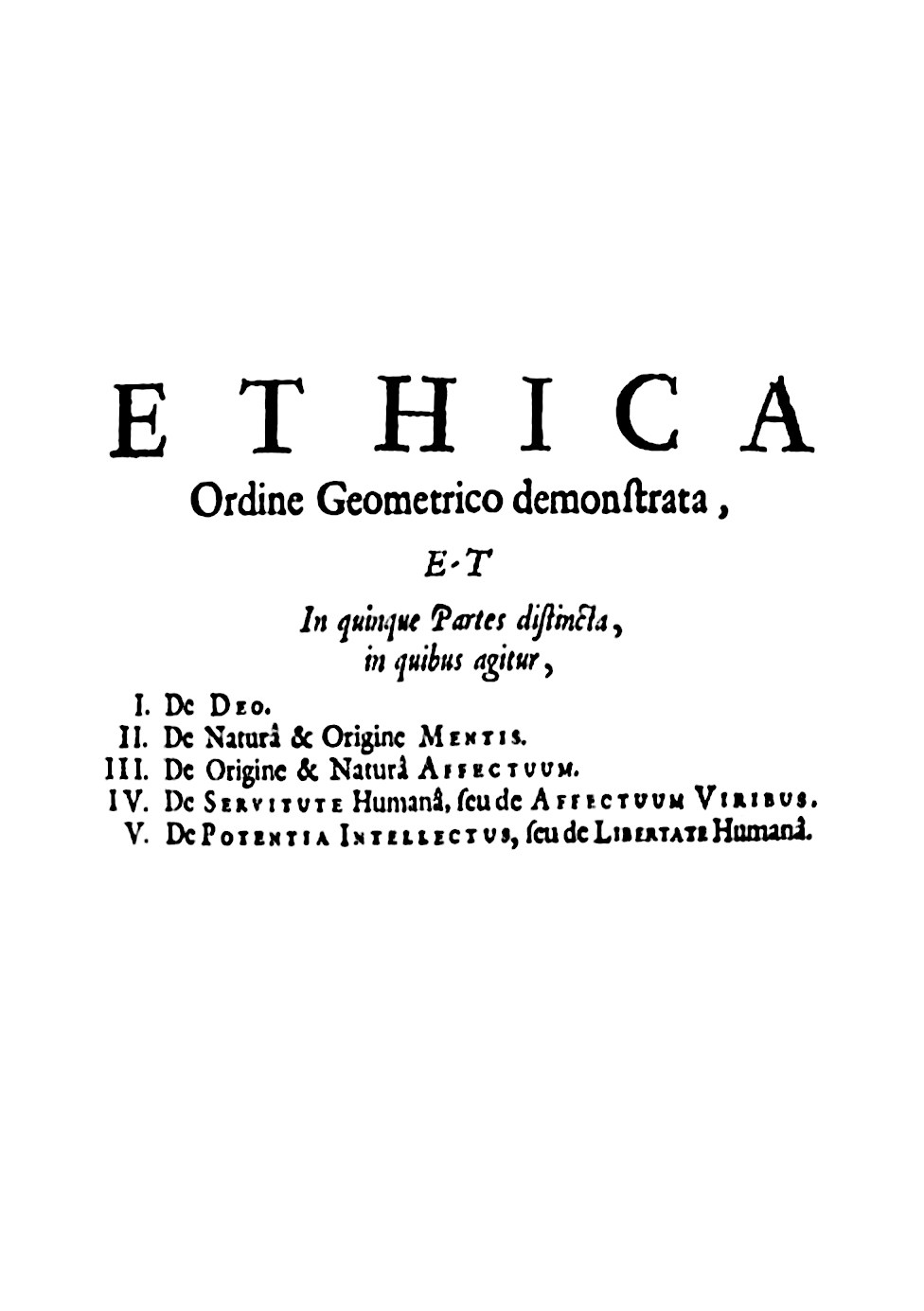
The opening page of Spinoza's magnum opus, Ethics

Between the Ancient era and the Middle Ages most of the Jewish philosophy concentrated around the Rabbinic literature that is expressed in the Talmud and Midrash. In the 9th century Saadia Gaon wrote the text Emunoth ve-Deoth which is the first systematic presentation and philosophic foundation of the dogmas of Judaism. The Golden age of Jewish culture in Spain included many influential Jewish philosophers such as Moses ibn Ezra, Abraham ibn Ezra, Solomon ibn Gabirol, Yehuda Halevi, Isaac Abravanel, Nahmanides, Joseph Albo, Abraham ibn Daud, Nissim of Gerona, Bahya ibn Paquda, Abraham bar Hiyya, Joseph ibn Tzaddik, Hasdai Crescas and Isaac ben Moses Arama. The most notable is Maimonides who is considered in the Jewish world to be a prominent philosopher and polymath in the Islamic and Western worlds. Outside of Spain, other philosophers are Natan'el al-Fayyumi, Elia del Medigo, Jedaiah ben Abraham Bedersi and Gersonides.

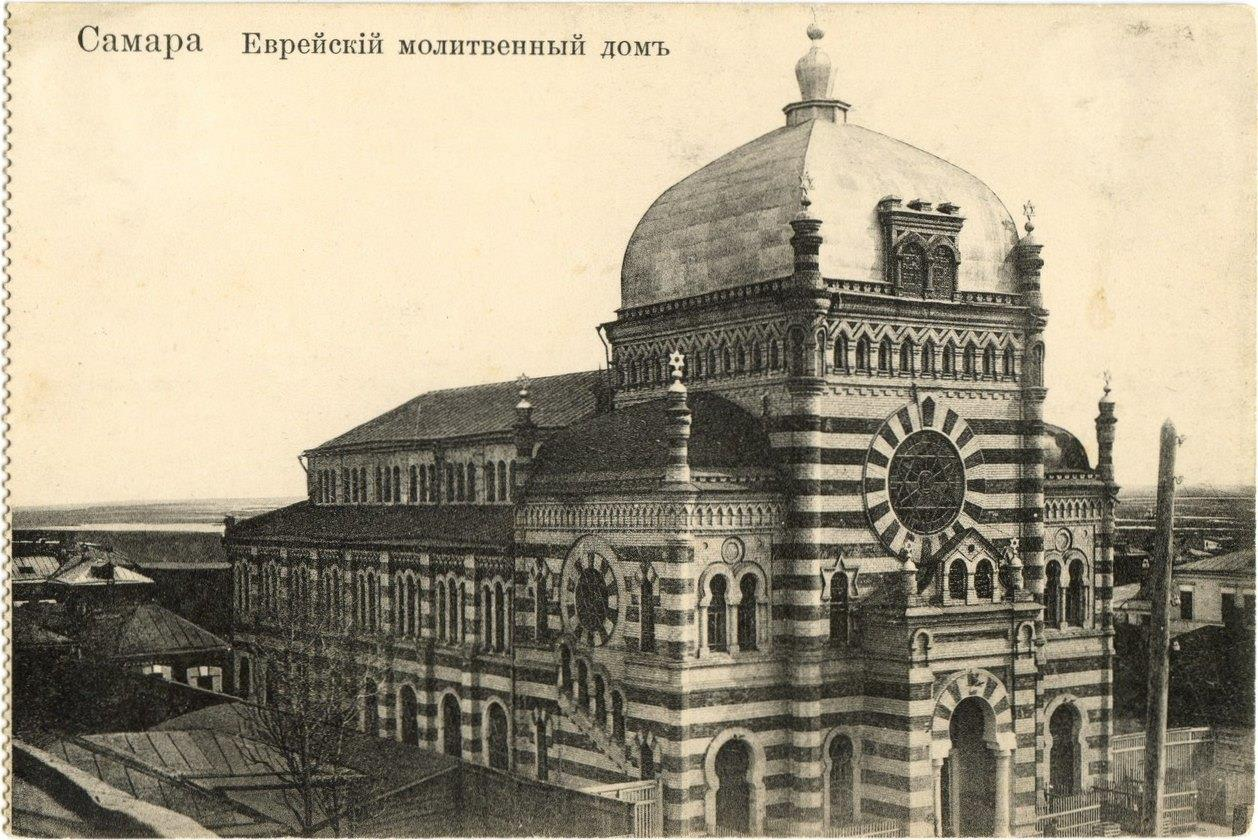
The Samra Great Synagogue

Jewish philosophers of the modern era, mainly in Europe, include Baruch Spinoza, founder of Spinozism, whose work included modern Rationalism and Biblical criticism and laid the groundwork for the 18th-century Enlightenment. His work has earned him recognition as one of Western philosophy's most important thinkers; others are Isaac Orobio de Castro, Tzvi Ashkenazi, David Nieto, Isaac Cardoso, Jacob Abendana, Uriel da Costa, Francisco Sanches and Moses Almosnino. A new era began in the 18th century with the thought of Moses Mendelssohn. Mendelssohn has been described as the "'third Moses', with whom begins a new era in Judaism", just as new eras began with Moses the prophet and with Moses Maimonides. Mendelssohn was a German Jewish philosopher to whose ideas the renaissance of European Jews, Haskalah (the Jewish Enlightenment) is indebted. He has been referred to as the father of Reform Judaism, though Reform spokesmen have been "resistant to claim him as their spiritual father". Mendelssohn came to be regarded as a leading cultural figure of his time by both Germans and Jews. The Jewish Enlightenment philosophy included Menachem Mendel Lefin, Salomon Maimon and Isaac Satanow. The next 19th century comprised both secular and religious philosophy and included philosophers such as Elijah Benamozegh, Hermann Cohen, Moses Hess, Samson Raphael Hirsch, Samuel Hirsch, Nachman Krochmal, Samuel David Luzzatto, and Nachman of Breslov founder of Breslov. The 20th century included the notable philosophers Jacques Derrida, Karl Popper, Emmanuel Levinas, Claude Lévi-Strauss, Hilary Putnam, Alfred Tarski, Ludwig Wittgenstein, A. J. Ayer, Walter Benjamin, Raymond Aron, Theodor W. Adorno, Isaiah Berlin and Henri Bergson.

Philo (c. 25 BCE–c. 50 CE))	Nahmanides (1194–1270)	Maimonides (1135/1138–1204)	Baruch Spinoza (1632–1677)	Moses Mendelssohn (1729–1786)
Schneur Zalman of Liadi (1745–1812)	Emma Goldman (1869–1940)	Ludwig Wittgenstein (1889–1951)	Hannah Arendt (1906–1975)	Jacques Derrida (1930–2004)
				☢

== Education and politics ==
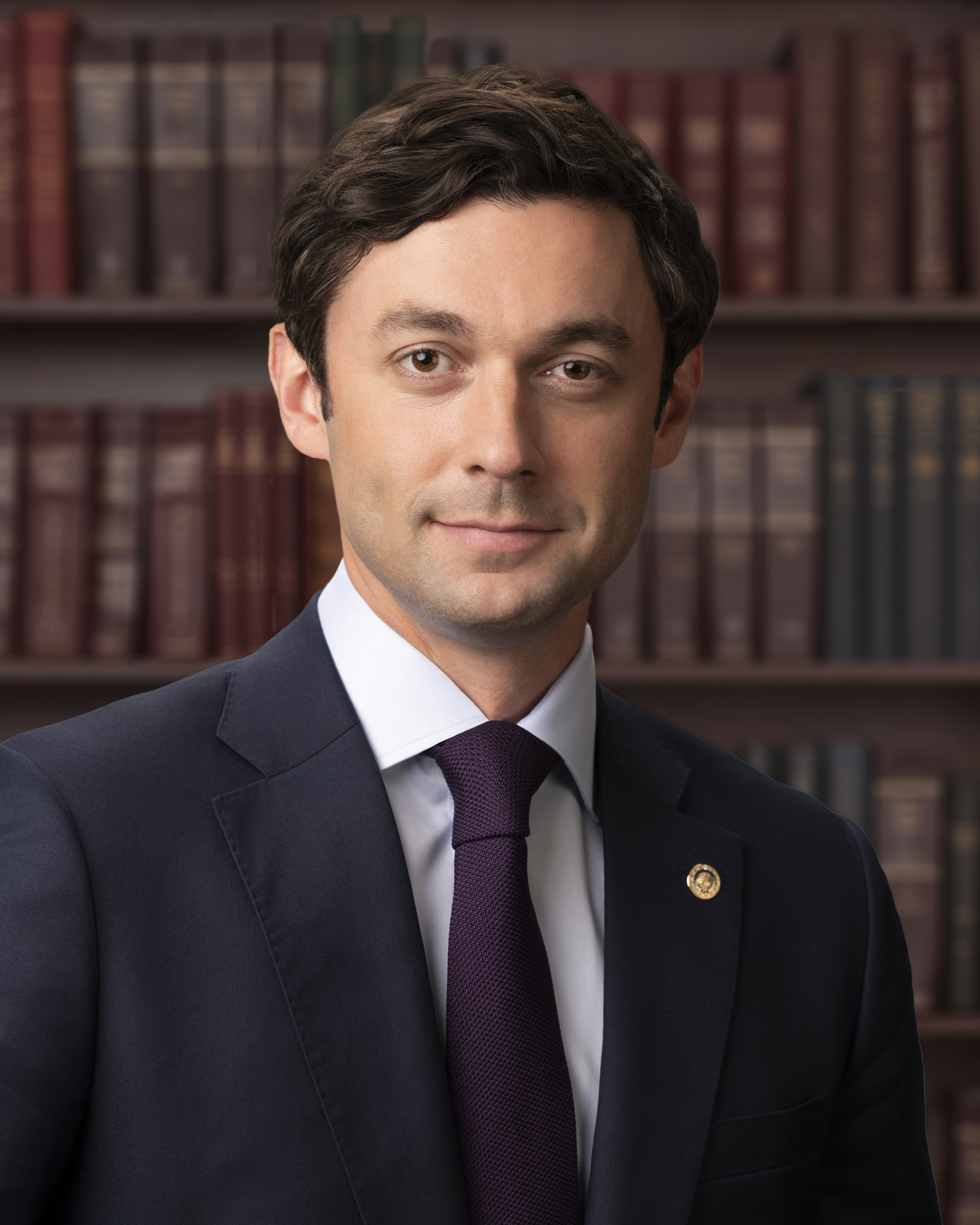
Jon Ossoff, Georgia's first Jewish senator for the Democratic Party

A range of moral and political views is evident early in the history of Judaism, that serves to partially explain the diversity that is apparent among secular Jews who are often influenced by moral beliefs that can be found in Jewish scripture, and traditions. In recent centuries, secular Jews in Europe and the Americas have tended towards the political left, and played key roles in the birth of the 19th century's labor movement and socialism. The biographies of women like Emma Goldman and Hannah Arendt embody complicated relationships between politics, Judaism and feminism. While Diaspora Jews have also been represented on the conservative side of the political spectrum, even politically conservative Jews have tended to support pluralism more consistently than many other elements of the political right. Some scholars attribute this to the fact that Jews are not expected to proselytize, derived from Halakha. This lack of a universalizing religion is combined with the fact that most Jews live as minorities in diaspora countries, and that no central Jewish religious authority has existed since 363 CE. Jews value education, and the value of education is strongly embedded in Jewish culture.

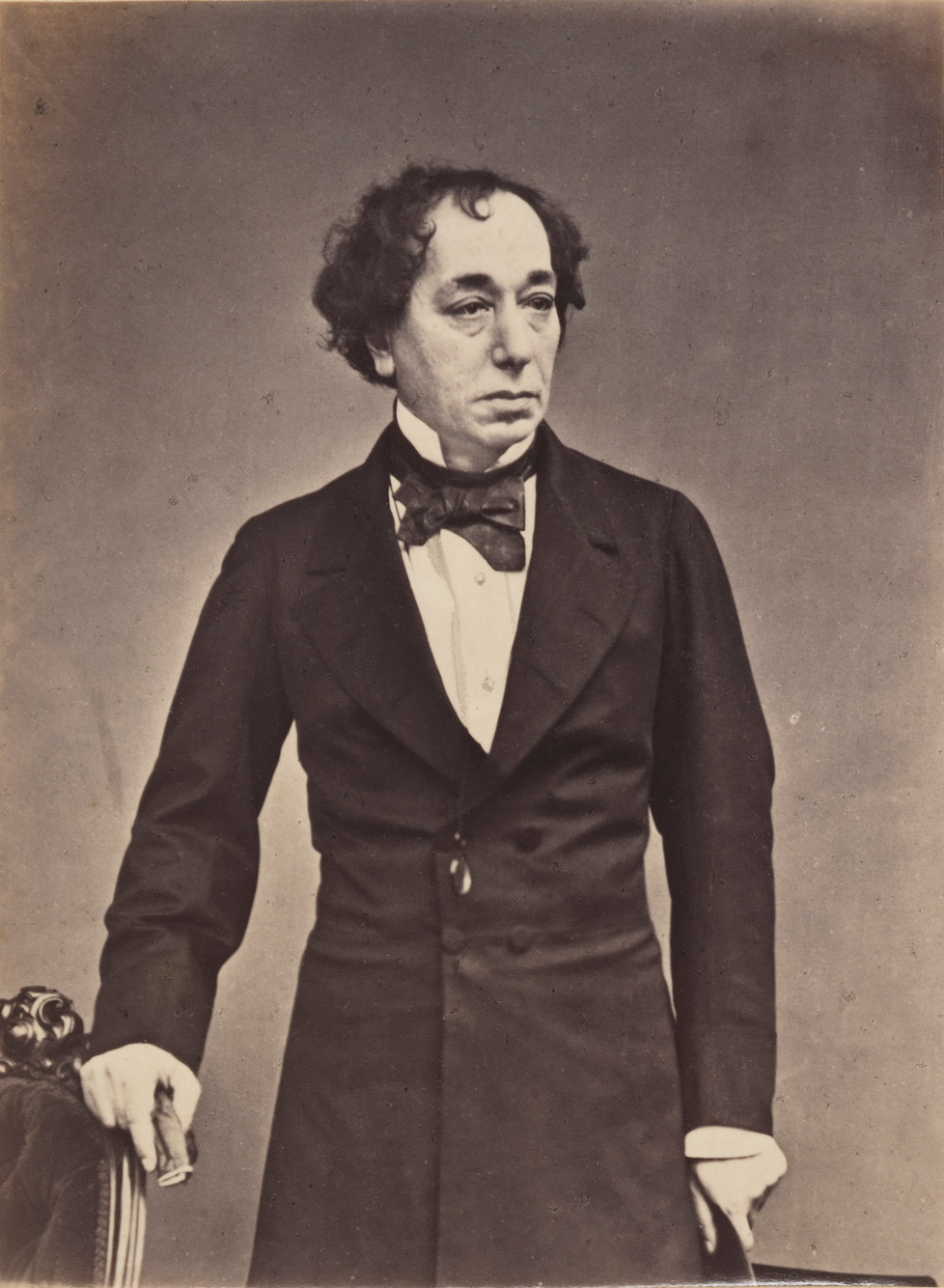
Benjamin Disraeli, first Prime Minister of the United Kingdom to be of Jewish descent; he was baptized and raised Christian

== Literature and poetry ==
In some places where there have been relatively high concentrations of Jews, distinct secular Jewish subcultures have arisen. For example, ethnic Jews formed an enormous proportion of the literary and artistic life of Vienna, Austria at the end of the 19th century, or of New York City 50 years later (and Los Angeles in the mid-late 20th century). Many of these creative Jews were not particularly religious people. In general, Jewish artistic culture in various periods reflected the culture in which they lived.

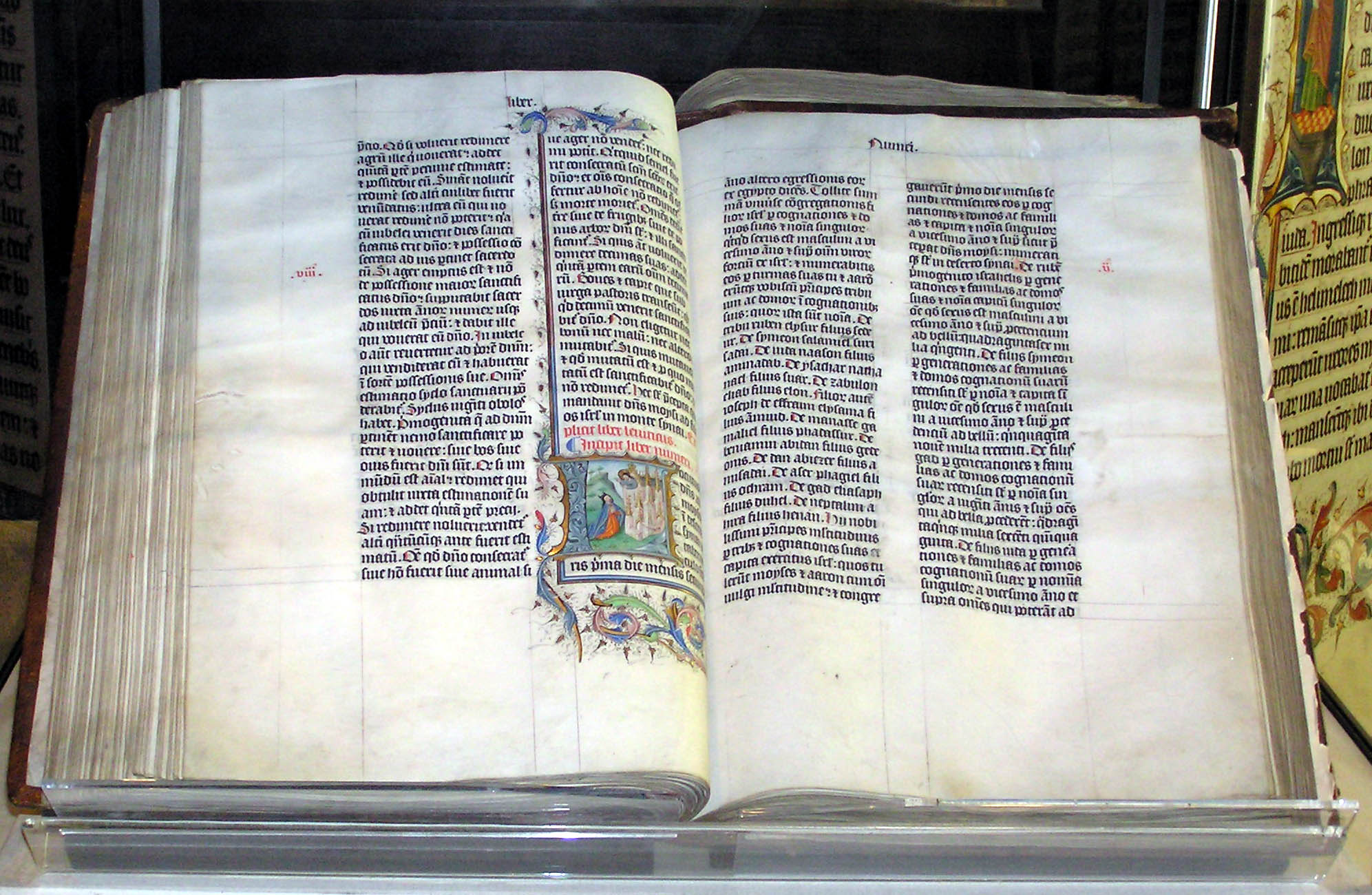
Gutenberg Bible. The Bible was authored by Jews during the Iron Ages and the Classical era. It comprises cultural values, basic human values, mythology and religious beliefs of both Judaism and Christianity

Literary and theatrical expressions of secular Jewish culture may be in specifically Jewish languages such as Hebrew, Yiddish, Judeo-Tat or Ladino, or it may be in the language of the surrounding cultures, such as English or German. Secular literature and theater in Yiddish largely began in the 19th century and was in decline by the middle of the 20th century. The revival of Hebrew beyond its use in the liturgy is largely an early 20th-century phenomenon, and is closely associated with Zionism. Apart from the use of Hebrew in Israel, whether a Jewish community will speak a Jewish or non-Jewish language as its main vehicle of discourse is generally dependent on how isolated or assimilated that community is. For example, the Jews in the shtetls of Poland and the Lower East Side of Manhattan during the early 20th century spoke Yiddish at most times, while assimilated Jews in 19th and early 20th-century Germany spoke German, and American-born Jews in the United States speak English.

Jewish authors have both created a unique Jewish literature and contributed to the national literature of many of the countries in which they live. Though not strictly secular, the Yiddish works of authors like Sholem Aleichem (whose collected works amounted to 28 volumes) and Isaac Bashevis Singer (winner of the 1978 Nobel Prize), form their own canon, focusing on the Jewish experience in both Eastern Europe, and in America. In the United States, Jewish writers like Philip Roth, Saul Bellow, and many others are considered among the greatest American authors, and incorporate a distinctly secular Jewish view into many of their works. The poetry of Allen Ginsberg often touches on Jewish themes (notably the early autobiographical works such as Howl and Kaddish). Other famous Jewish authors that made contributions to world literature include Heinrich Heine, German poet, Miklós Radnóti, Hungarian poet, Mordecai Richler, Canadian author, Isaac Babel, Russian author, Franz Kafka, of Prague, and Harry Mulisch, whose novel The Discovery of Heaven was revealed by a 2007 poll as the "Best Dutch Book Ever".

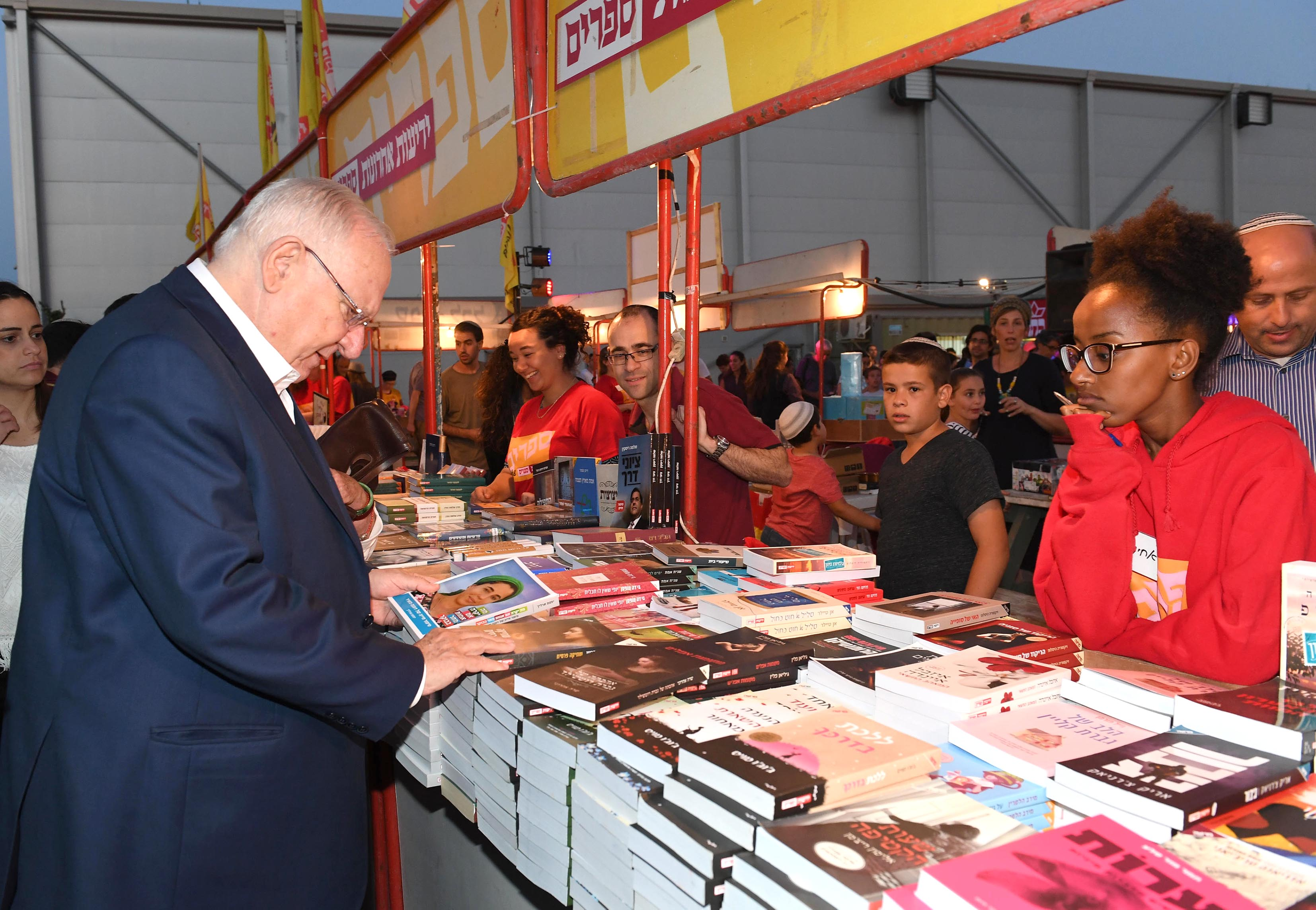
Hebrew Book Week in Jerusalem, 2017

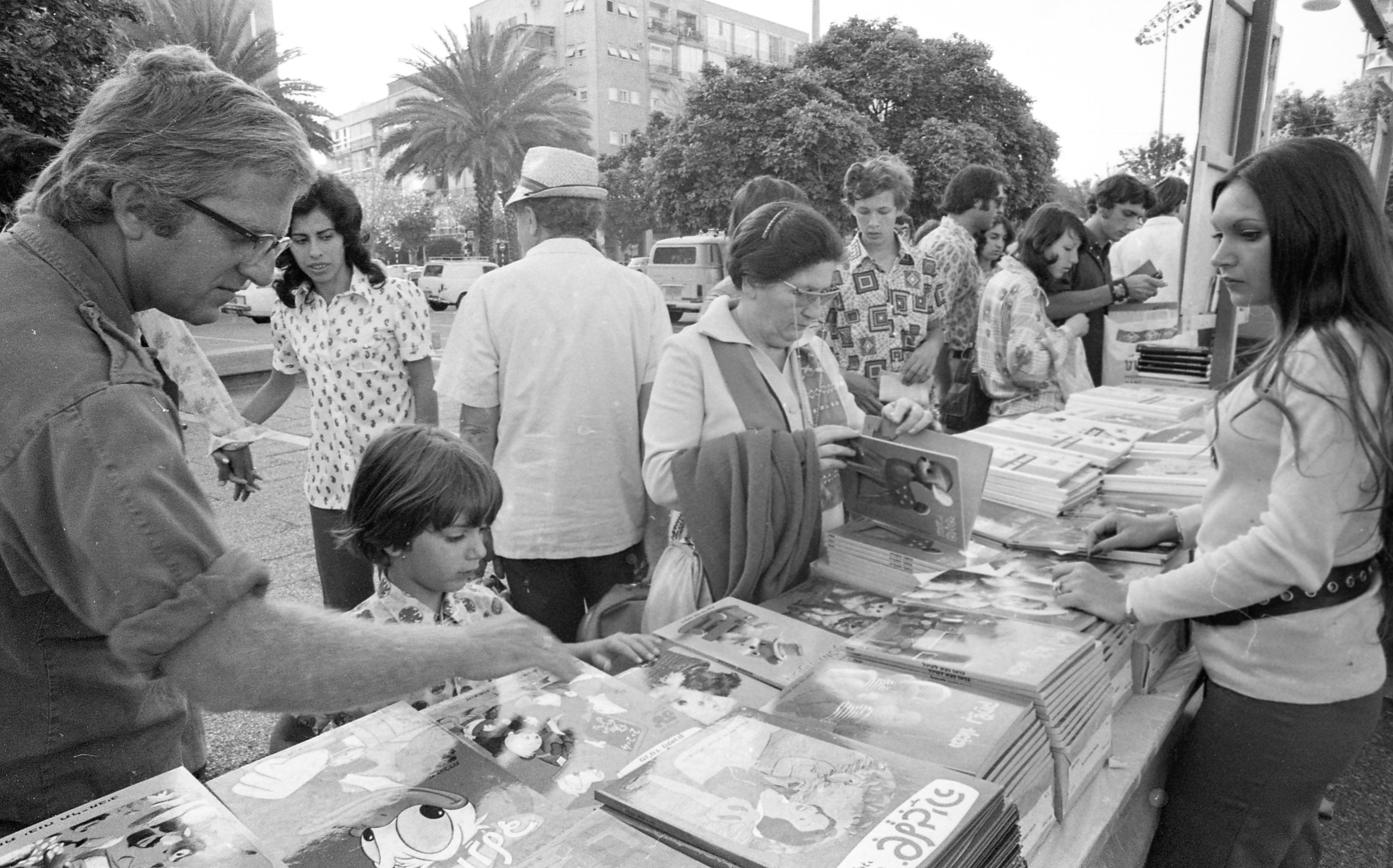
Hebrew Book Week in Tel Aviv, 1974

In Modern Judaism: An Oxford Guide, Yaakov Malkin, Professor of Aesthetics and Rhetoric at Tel Aviv University and the founder and academic director of Meitar College for Judaism as Culture in Jerusalem, writes:" Secular Jewish culture embraces literary works that have stood the test of time as sources of aesthetic pleasure and ideas shared by Jews and non-Jews, works that live on beyond the immediate socio-cultural context within which they were created. They include the writings of such Jewish authors as Sholem Aleichem, Itzik Manger, Isaac Bashevis Singer, Philip Roth, Saul Bellow, S.Y. Agnon, Isaac Babel, Martin Buber, Isaiah Berlin, Haim Nahman Bialik, Yehuda Amichai, Amos Oz, A.B. Yehoshua, and David Grossman. It boasts masterpieces that have had a considerable influence on all of western culture, Jewish culture included – works such as those of Heinrich Heine, Gustav Mahler, Leonard Bernstein, Marc Chagall, Jacob Epstein, Ben Shahn, Amedeo Modigliani, Franz Kafka, Max Reinhardt (Goldman), Ernst Lubitsch, and Woody Allen."

Other notable contributors are Isaac Asimov author of the Foundation series and others such as I, robot, Nightfall and The Gods Themselves; Joseph Heller (Catch-22); R.L. Stine (Goosebumps series); J. D. Salinger (The Catcher in the Rye); Michael Chabon (The Amazing Adventures of Kavalier & Clay, The Yiddish Policemen's Union); Marcel Proust (In Search of Lost Time); Arthur Miller (Death of a Salesman and The Crucible); Will Eisner (A Contract with God); Shel Silverstein (The Giving Tree); Arthur Koestler (Darkness at Noon, The Thirteenth Tribe); Saul Bellow (Herzog); The historical novel series The Accursed Kings by Maurice Druon is an inspiration for George R. R. Martin's A Song of Ice and Fire novels.

Among recipient of Nobel Prize in Literature, 13% of them were or are Jewish.

Another aspect of Jewish literature is the ethical, called Musar literature. This literature has been composed by both religious and secular authors.

Hebrew poetry is expressed by various of poets in different eras of Jewish history. Biblical poetry is related to the poetry in biblical times as it expressed in the Hebrew Bible and Jewish sacred texts. In medieval times the Jewish poetry was mainly expressed by piyyutim and several poets such as Yehuda Halevi, Samuel ibn Naghrillah, Solomon ibn Gabirol, Moses ibn Ezra, Abraham ibn Ezra and Dunash ben Labrat. Modern Hebrew poetry is mostly related to the era of and after the revival of the Hebrew language, pioneered by Moshe Chaim Luzzatto in the Haskalah era and succeeded by poets such as Hayim Nahman Bialik, Nathan Alterman and Shaul Tchernichovsky.

Yehuda Halevi (c. 1075–1141)	Heinrich Heine (1797–1856)	Sholem Aleichem (1859–1916)	Franz Kafka (1883–1924)	Boris Pasternak (1890–1960)	Ayn Rand (1905–1982)	Isaac Asimov (1920–1992)	Allen Ginsberg (1926–1997)

== Theatre ==
=== Yiddish theatre ===
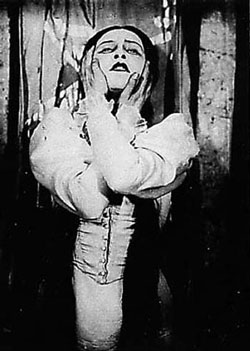
Hana Rovina in The Dybbuk (1920), a play by S. Ansky

The Ukrainian Jew Abraham Goldfaden founded the first professional Yiddish-language theatre troupe in Iași, Romania in 1876. The next year, his troupe achieved enormous success in Bucharest. Within a decade, Goldfaden and others brought Yiddish theater to Ukraine, Russia, Poland, Germany, New York City, and other cities with significant Ashkenazic populations. Between 1890 and 1940, over a dozen Yiddish theatre groups existed in New York City alone, in the Yiddish Theater District, performing original plays, musicals, and Yiddish translations of theatrical works and opera. Perhaps the most famous of Yiddish-language plays is The Dybbuk (1919) by S. Ansky.

Yiddish theater in New York in the early 20th century rivalled English-language theater in quantity and often surpassed it in quality. A 1925 New York Times article remarks, "…Yiddish theater… is now a stable American institution and no longer dependent on immigration from Eastern Europe. People who can neither speak nor write Yiddish attend Yiddish stage performances and pay Broadway prices on Second Avenue." This article also mentions other aspects of a New York Jewish cultural life "in full flower" at that time, among them the fact that the extensive New York Yiddish-language press of the time included seven daily newspapers.

In fact, however, the next generation of American Jews spoke mainly English to the exclusion of Yiddish; they brought the artistic energy of Yiddish theater into the American theatrical mainstream, but usually in a less specifically Jewish form.

Yiddish theater, most notably Moscow State Jewish Theater directed by Solomon Mikhoels, also played a prominent role in the arts scene of the Soviet Union until Stalin's 1948 reversal in government policy toward the Jews. (See Rootless cosmopolitan, Night of the Murdered Poets.)

Montreal's Dora Wasserman Yiddish Theatre continues to thrive after 50 years of performance.

=== European theatre ===
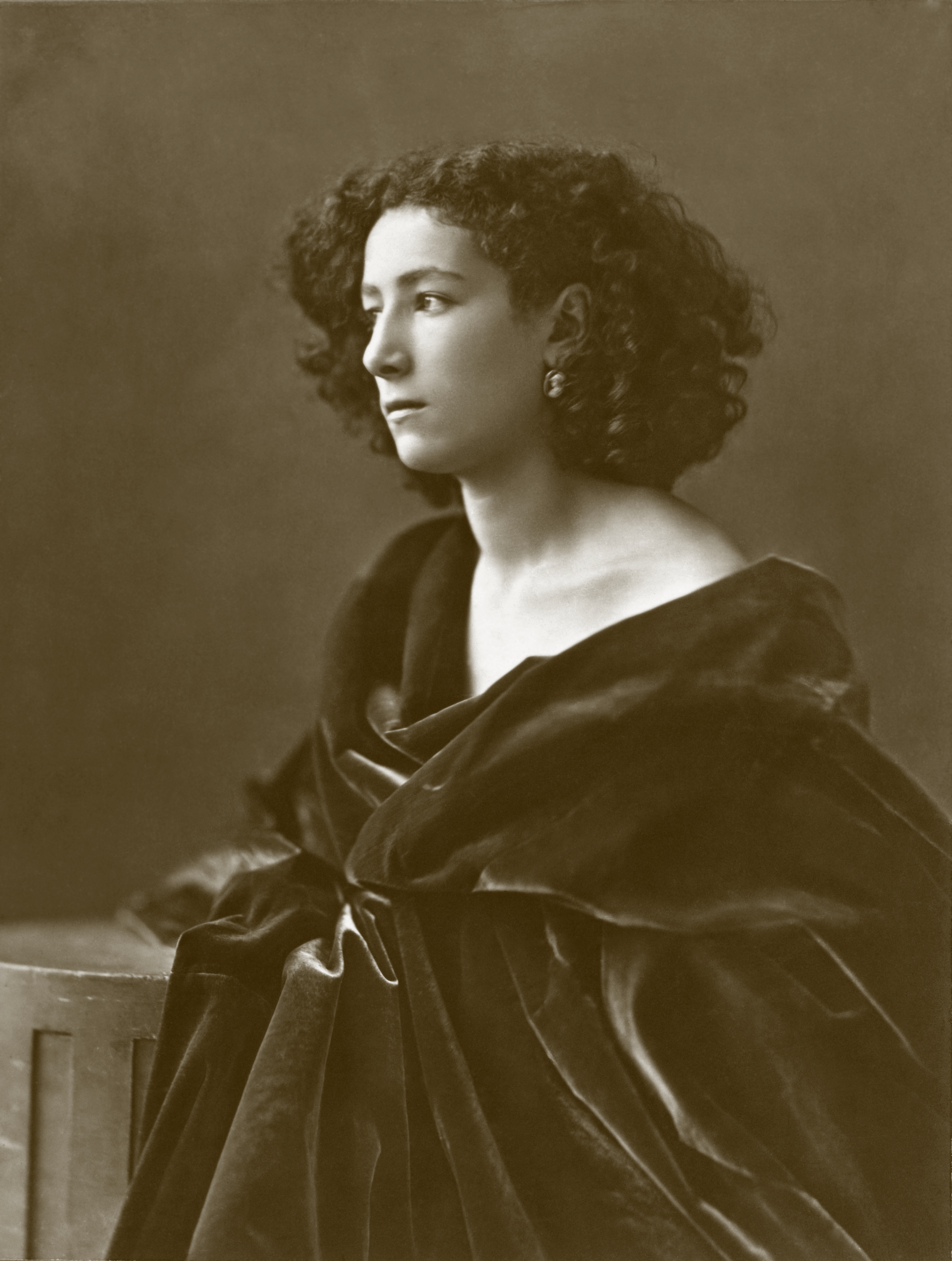
Sarah Bernhardt, 1864

From their Emancipation to World War II, Jews were very active and sometimes even dominant in certain forms of European theatre, and after the Holocaust many Jews continued to contribute to that cultural form. For example, commenting about German theater during the 1880s, Nietzsche observed "What good actor of today is not Jewish?", reflecting that many acting, directing and writing positions were often filled by Jews. Likewise, the Jewish Museum notes that in Berlin during the Wilhelmine period from 1890 to 1918, Jewish artists "could be found in the forefront of the performing arts, from high drama to more popular forms like cabaret and revue, and eventually film." Additionally, "Jewish audiences patronized innovative theater, regardless of whether they approved of what they saw." The British historian Paul Johnson, commenting on Jewish contributions to European culture at the Fin de siècle, writes that

The area where Jewish influence was strongest was the theatre, especially in Berlin. Playwrights like Carl Sternheim, Arthur Schnitzler, Ernst Toller, Erwin Piscator, Walter Hasenclever, Ferenc Molnár and Carl Zuckmayer, and influential producers like Max Reinhardt, appeared at times to dominate the stage, which tended to be modishly left-wing, pro-republican, experimental and sexually daring. But it was certainly not revolutionary, and it was cosmopolitan rather than Jewish.

Jews also made similar, if not as massive, contributions to theatre and drama in Austria, Britain, France, and Russia (in the national languages of those countries). Jews in Vienna, Paris and German cities found cabaret both a popular and effective means of expression, as German cabaret in the Weimar Republic "was mostly a Jewish art form". The Wilhelmine and Weimar periods not only saw Jewish involvement in German-language theater, especially trends such as modernism and cabaret, but also vibrant interactions between German-language theater and Yiddish theater in both Germany and Austria. The involvement of Jews in Central European theatre was halted during the rise of the Nazis and the purging of Jews from cultural posts, though many emigrated to Western Europe or the United States and continued working there.

=== English-language theatre ===
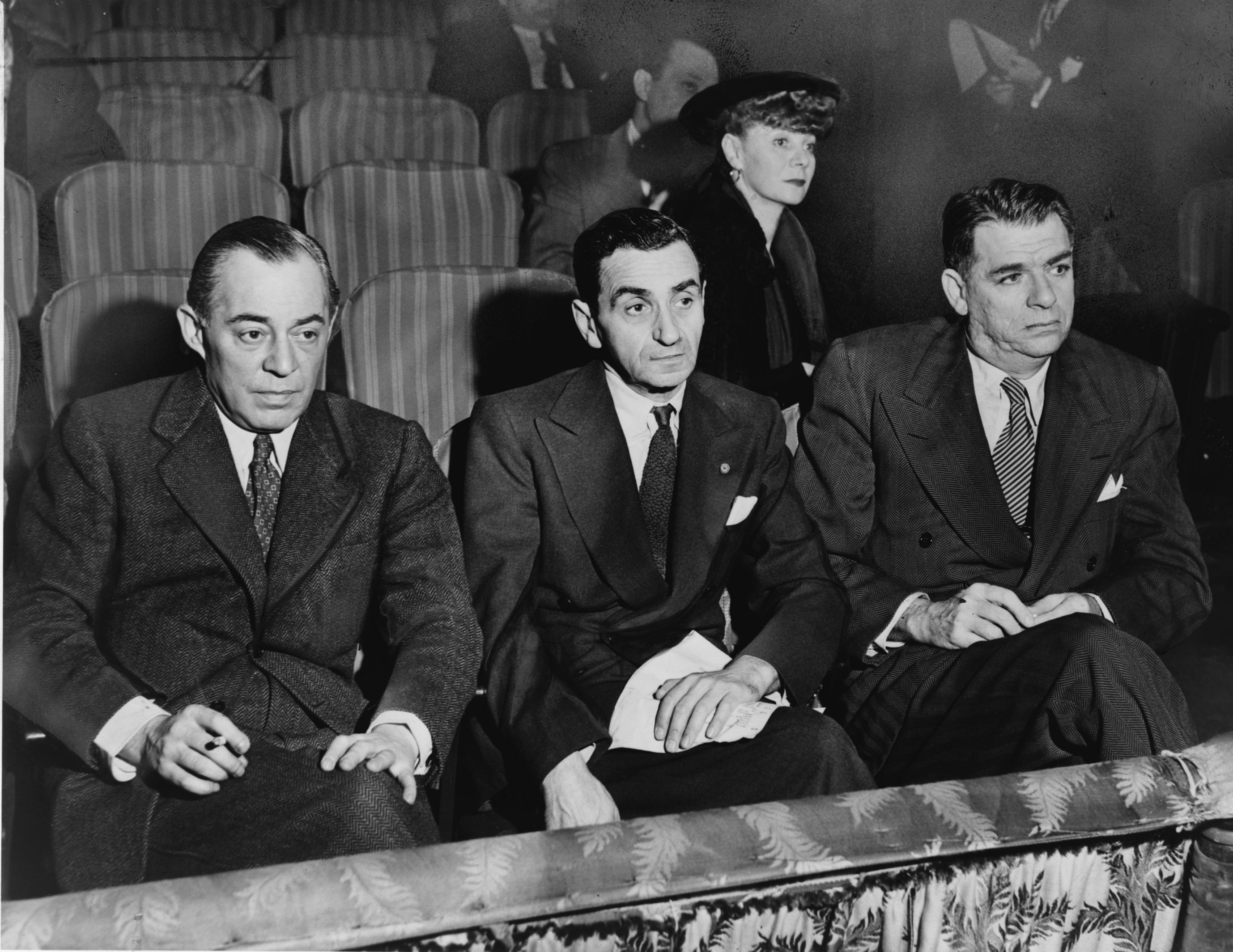
Rodgers (left) and Hammerstein (right), with Irving Berlin (middle) and Helen Tamiris, watching auditions at the St. James Theatre in 1948

In the early 20th century the traditions of New York's vibrant Yiddish Theatre District both rivaled and fed into Broadway. In the English-speaking theatre Jewish émigrés brought novel theatrical ideas from Europe, such as the theatrical realist movement and the philosophy of Konstantin Stanislavski, whose teachings would influence many Jewish American acting teachers such as the Yiddish theatre-trained acting theorist Stella Adler. Jewish immigrants were instrumental in the creation and development of the genre of musical theatre and earlier forms of theatrical entertainment in America, and would innovate the new, distinctly American, art form, the Broadway musical. Brandeis University Professor Stephen J. Whitfield has commented that "More so than behind the screen, the talent behind the stage was for over half a century virtually the monopoly of one ethnic group. That is... [a] feature which locates Broadway at the center of Jewish culture". New York University Professor Laurence Maslon says that "There would be no American musical without Jews… Their influence is corollary to the influence of black musicians on jazz; there were as many Jews involved in the form". Other writers, such as Jerome Caryn, have noted that musical theatre and other forms of American entertainment are uniquely indebted to the contributions of Jewish Americans, since "there might not have been a modern Broadway without the "Asiatic horde" of comedians, gossip columnists, songwriters, and singers that grew out of the ghetto, whether it was on the Lower East Side, Harlem (a Jewish ghetto before it was a black one), Newark, or Washington, D.C." Likewise, in the analysis of Aaron Kula, director of The Klezmer Company,

...the Jewish experience has always been best expressed by music, and Broadway has always been an integral part of the Jewish American experience... The difference is that one can expand the definition of "Jewish Broadway" to include an interdisciplinary roadway with a wide range of artistic activities packed onto one avenue—theatre, opera, symphony, ballet, publishing companies, choirs, synagogues and more. This vibrant landscape reflects the life, times and creative output of the Jewish American artist.

In the 19th and early 20th centuries the European operetta, a precursor the musical, often featured the work of Jewish composers such as Paul Abraham, Leo Ascher, Edmund Eysler, Leo Fall, Bruno Granichstaedten, Jacques Offenbach, Emmerich Kalman, Sigmund Romberg, Oscar Straus and Rudolf Friml; the latter four eventually moved to the United States and produced their works on the New York stage. One of the librettists for Bizet's Carmen (not an operetta proper but rather a work of the earlier Opéra comique form) was the Jewish Ludovic Halévy, niece of composer Fromental Halévy (Bizet himself was not Jewish but he married the elder Halevy's daughter, many have suspected that he was the descendant of Jewish converts to Christianity, and others have noticed Jewish-sounding intervals in his music). The Viennese librettist Victor Leon summarized the connection of Jewish composers and writers with the form of operetta: "The audience for operetta wants to laugh beneath tears—and that is exactly what Jews have been doing for the last two thousand years since the destruction of Jerusalem". Another factor in the evolution of musical theatre was vaudeville, and during the early 20th century the form was explored and expanded by Jewish comedians and actors such as Jack Benny, Fanny Brice, Eddie Cantor, The Marx Brothers, Anna Held, Al Jolson, Molly Picon, Sophie Tucker and Ed Wynn. During the period when Broadway was monopolized by revues and similar entertainments, Jewish producer Florenz Ziegfeld dominated the theatrical scene with his Follies.

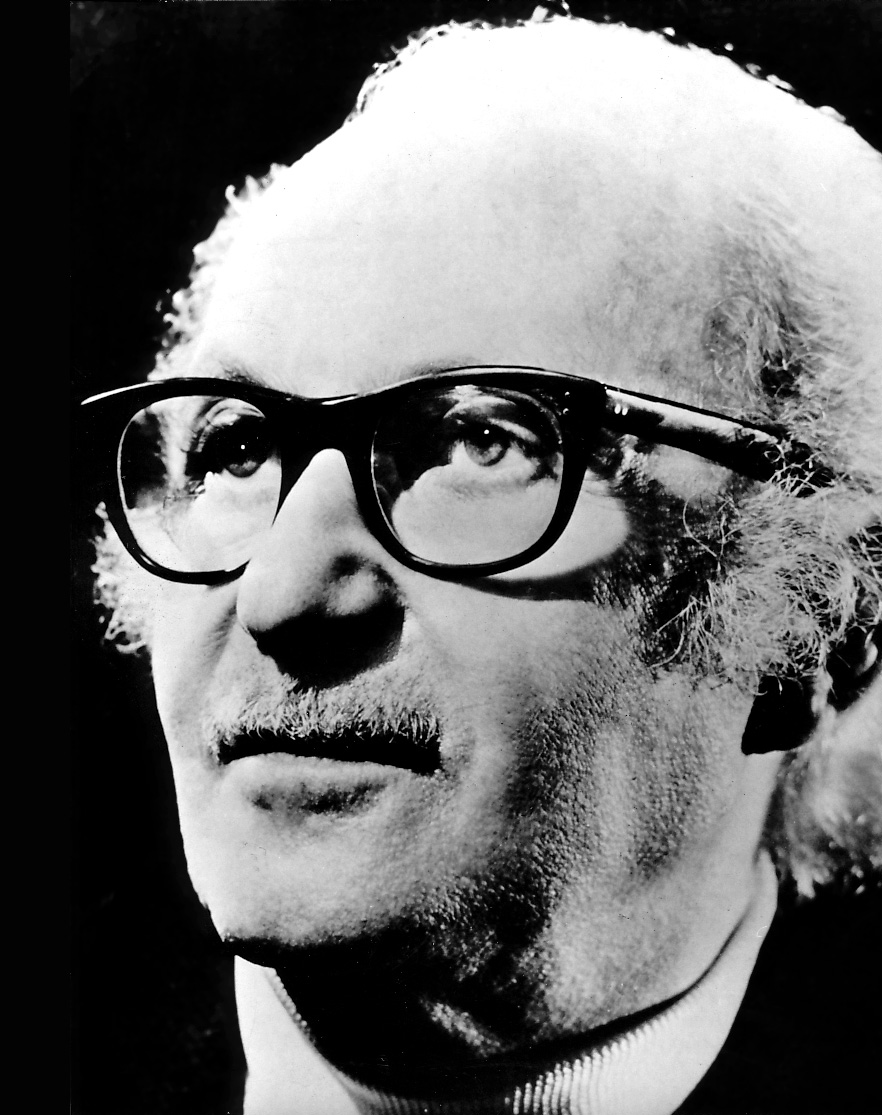
Lee Strasberg

By 1910 Jews (the vast majority of them immigrants from Eastern Europe) already composed a quarter of the population of New York City, and almost immediately Jewish artists and intellectuals began to show their influence on the cultural life of that city, and through time, the country as a whole. Likewise, while the modern musical can best be described as a fusion of operetta, earlier American entertainment and African-American culture and music, as well as Jewish culture and music, the actual authors of the first "book musicals" were the Jewish Jerome Kern, Oscar Hammerstein II, George and Ira Gershwin, George S. Kaufman and Morrie Ryskind. From that time until the 1980s a vast majority of successful musical theatre composers, lyricists, and book-writers were Jewish (a notable exception is the Protestant Cole Porter, who acknowledged that the reason he was so successful on Broadway was that he wrote what he called "Jewish music"). Rodgers and Hammerstein, Frank Loesser, Lerner and Loewe, Stephen Sondheim, Leonard Bernstein, Stephen Schwartz, Kander and Ebb and dozens of others during the "Golden Age" of musical theatre were Jewish. Since the Tony Award for Best Original Score was instituted in 1947, approximately 70% of nominated scores and 60% of winning scores were by Jewish composers. Of successful British and French musical writers both in the West End and Broadway, Claude-Michel Schönberg and Lionel Bart are Jewish, among others.

One explanation of the affinity of Jewish composers and playwrights to the musical is that "traditional Jewish religious music was most often led by a single singer, a cantor while Christians emphasize choral singing." Many of these writers used the musical to explore issues relating to assimilation, the acceptance of the outsider in society, the racial situation in the United States, the overcoming of obstacles through perseverance, and other topics pertinent to Jewish Americans and Western Jews in general, often using subtle and disguised stories to get this point across. For example, Kern, Rodgers, Hammerstein, the Gershwins, Harold Arlen and Yip Harburg wrote musicals and operas aiming to normalize societal toleration of minorities and urging racial harmony; these works included Show Boat, Porgy and Bess, Finian's Rainbow, South Pacific and The King and I. Towards the end of Golden Age, writers also began to openly and overtly tackle Jewish subjects and issues, such as Fiddler on the Roof and Rags; Bart's Blitz! also tackles relations between Jews and Gentiles. Jason Robert Brown and Alfred Uhry's Parade is a sensitive exploration of both antisemitism and historical American racism. The original concept that became West Side Story was set on the Lower East Side during Easter-Passover celebrations; the rival gangs were to be Jewish and Italian Catholic.

The ranks of prominent Jewish producers, directors, designers and performers include Boris Aronson, David Belasco, Joel Grey, the Minskoff family, Zero Mostel, Joseph Papp, Mandy Patinkin, the Nederlander family, Harold Prince, Max Reinhardt, Jerome Robbins, the Shubert family and Julie Taymor. Jewish playwrights have also contributed to non-musical drama and theatre, both Broadway and regional. Edna Ferber, Moss Hart, Lillian Hellman, Arthur Miller and Neil Simon are only some of the prominent Jewish playwrights in American theatrical history. Approximately 34% of the plays and musicals that have won the Pulitzer Prize for Drama were written and composed by Jewish Americans.

The Association for Jewish Theater is a contemporary organization that includes both American and international theaters that focus on theater with Jewish content. It has also expanded to include Jewish playwrights.

=== Hebrew and Israeli theatre ===
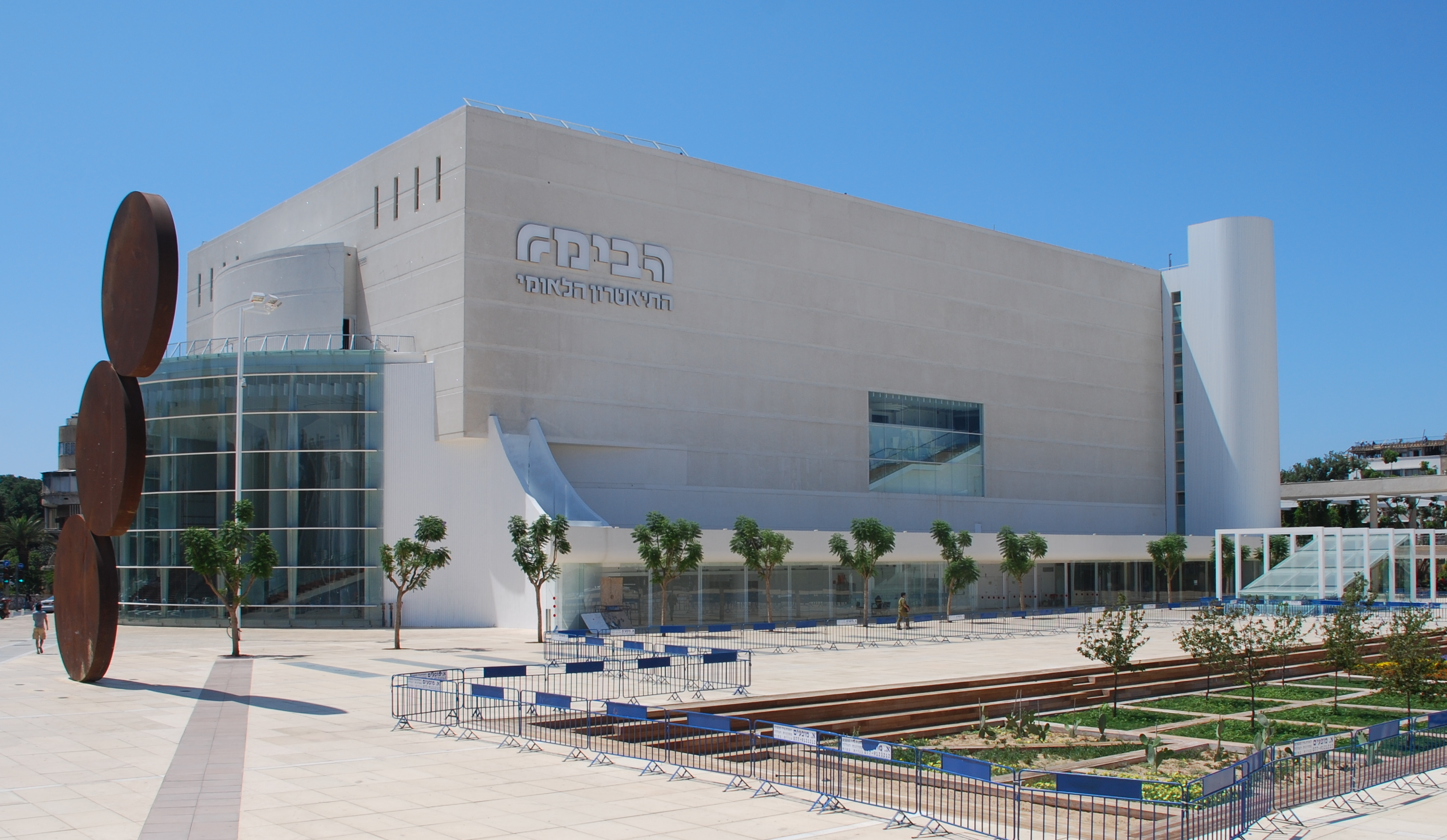
Habima theater, 2021

The earliest known Hebrew language drama was written around 1550 by a Jewish-Italian writer from Mantua. A few works were written by rabbis and Kabbalists in 17th-century Amsterdam, where Jews were relatively free from persecution and had both flourishing religious and secular Jewish cultures. All of these early Hebrew plays were about Biblical or mystical subjects, often in the form of Talmudic parables. During the post-Emancipation period in 19th-century Europe, many Jews translated great European plays such as those by Shakespeare, Molière and Schiller, giving the characters Jewish names and transplanting the plot and setting to within a Jewish context.

Modern Hebrew theatre and drama, however, began with the development of Modern Hebrew in Europe (the first Hebrew theatrical professional performance was in Moscow in 1918) and was "closely linked with the Jewish national renaissance movement of the twentieth century. The historical awareness and the sense of primacy which accompanied the Hebrew theatre in its early years dictated the course of its artistic and aesthetic development". These traditions were soon transplanted to Israel. Playwrights such as Natan Alterman, Hayyim Nahman Bialik, Leah Goldberg, Ephraim Kishon, Hanoch Levin, Aharon Megged, Moshe Shamir, Avraham Shlonsky, Yehoshua Sobol and A. B. Yehoshua have written Hebrew-language plays. Themes that are obviously common in these works are the Holocaust, the Arab–Israeli conflict, the meaning of Jewishness, and contemporary secular-religious tensions within Jewish Israel. The most well-known Hebrew theatre company and Israel's national theatre is the Habima (meaning "the stage" in Hebrew), which was formed in 1913 in Lithuania, and re-established in 1917 in Russia; another prominent Israeli theatre company is the Cameri Theatre, which is "Israel's first and leading repertory theatre".

=== Judeo-Tat theatre ===
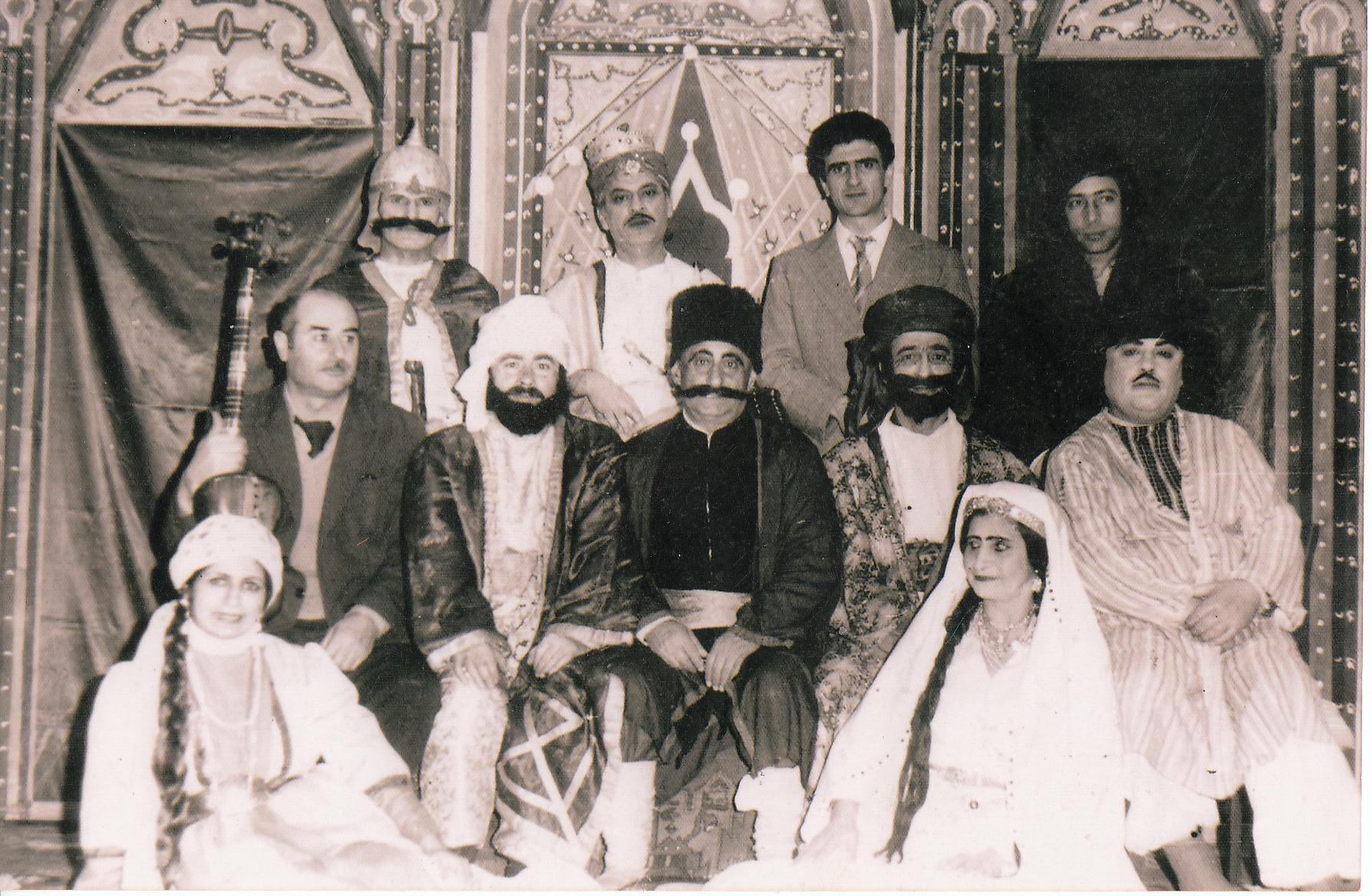
Acting troupe in the play Ashig Garib. Judeo-Tat theatre. Derbent, USSR. 1984. First row - from left to right: Katya, Bikel Matatova. Second row - from left to right: musician Israel Izrailov, Roman Izyaev, Avshalum Nakhshunov, Raziil Ilyaguev, Abram Avdalimov. Third row - from left to right: Ilizir Abramov, Anatoly Yusupov, Israel Tsvaygenbaum.

The first theatrical event by Mountain Jews took place in December 1903, when Asaf Agarunov, a teacher and a Zionist, staged a story by Naum Shoykovich, translated from Hebrew, "The Burn for Burn," and staged it in honor of schoolteacher Nagdimuna ben Simona's (Shimunov) wedding.

In 1918, a drama studio was opened in Derbent, Soviet Union headed by Rabbi Yashaiyo Rabinovich.

In 1935, the first Soviet Union theatre opened in Derbent, which included three troupes – Russian, Mountain Jews and Turk. It was based on drama circles, which were led by Manashir and Khanum Shalumov. Initially, in the circle, men played the female roles. Later, women began to take part in the theatre. In 1939, the Judeo-Tat theatre was the winner of the festival of theatres in Dagestan.

During World War II, most of the actors were drafted into the army. Many theatre actors died in the war. In 1943, the theatre resumed its work, and in 1948 it was closed. The official reason was its unprofitability.

In the 1960s, the theatre resumed its activities and experienced its second heyday. The actress, Akhso Ilyaguevna Shalumova (1909–1985), "Honored Artist of the Dagestan ASSR" returned to the theatre. She played the role of (Juhuri:Шими Дербенди) - Shimi Derbendi's wife - Shahnugor, based on the stories of writer Hizgil Avshalumov.

In the 1970s, the People's Judeo-Tat theatre was organized. For many years, its director was Abram Avdalimov, "Honored Cultural Worker of the Dagestan ASSR," singer, actor and playwright. His successor was Roman Izyaev, who was awarded the Order of the Badge of Honour for his meritorious service.

In the 1990s, the Judeo-Tat theatre experienced another crisis: it rarely held performances and did not have any premieres. Only in 2000, when it became a municipal theater, was it able to resume its activity. From 2000 to 2002, the theatre was headed by actor and musician Raziil Semenovich Ilyaguev (1945–2016), "Honored Worker of Culture of the Republic of Dagestan." For the next two years the theatre was headed by Alesya Isakova.

In 2004, Lev Yakovlevich Manakhimov (1950–2021), "Honored Artist of the Republic of Dagestan," became the artistic director of the theatre. After the death of Manakhimov, Boris Yudaev became the head of the theatre.

== Cinema ==
In the era when Yiddish theatre was still a major force in the world of theatre, over 100 films were made in Yiddish. Many are now lost. Prominent films included Shulamith (1931), the first Yiddish musical on film His Wife's Lover (1931), A Daughter of Her People (1932), the anti-Nazi film The Wandering Jew (1933), The Yiddish King Lear (1934), Shir Hashirim (1935), the biggest Yiddish film hit of all time Yidl Mitn Fidl (1936), Where Is My Child? (1937), Green Fields (1937), Dybuk (1937), The Singing Blacksmith (1938), Tevya (1939), Mirele Efros (1939), Lang ist der Weg (1948), and God, Man and Devil (1950).

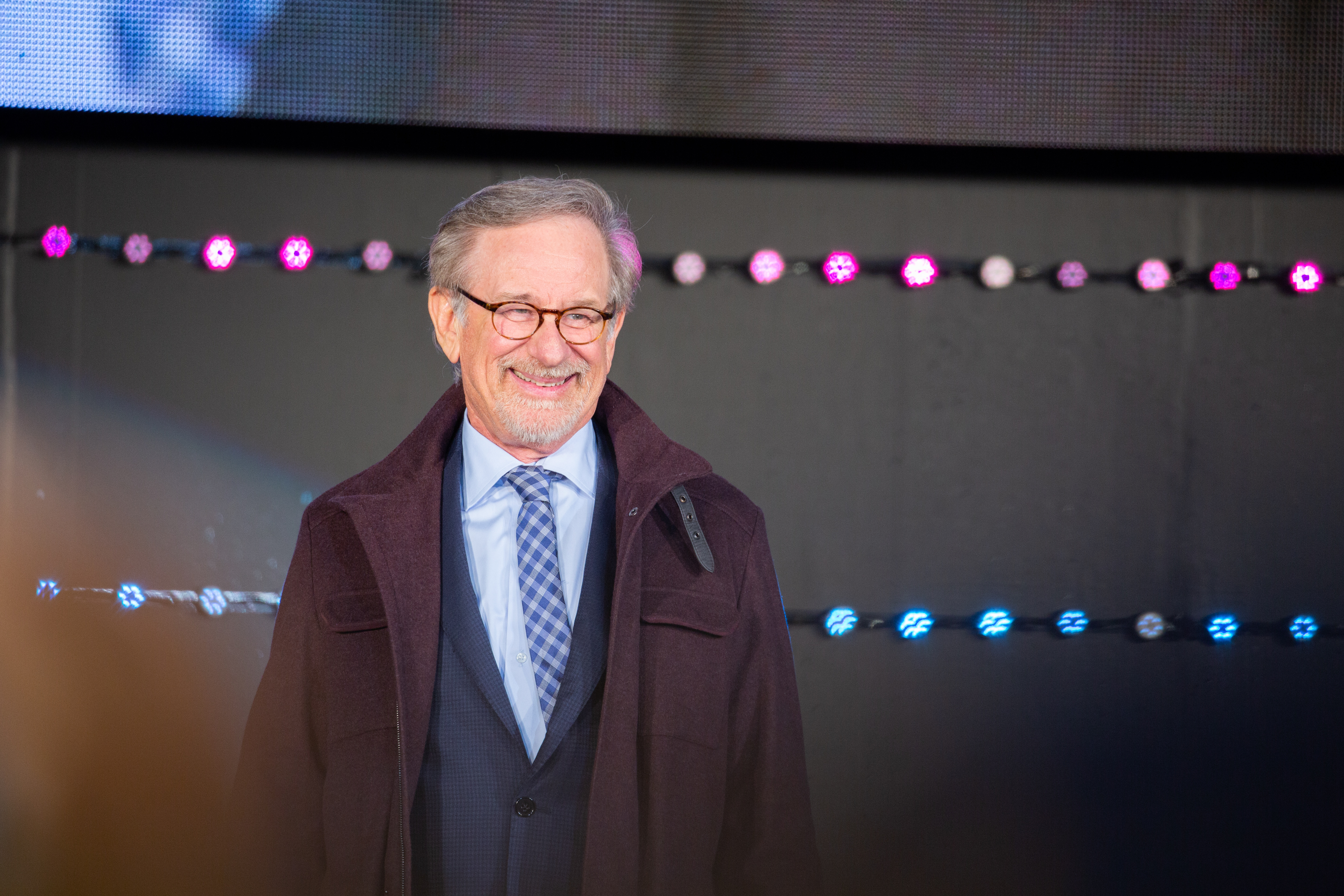
Steven Spielberg at a movie premiere in Japan

The roster of Jewish entrepreneurs in the English-language American film industry is legendary: Samuel Goldwyn, Louis B. Mayer, the Warner Brothers, David O. Selznick, Marcus Loew, and Adolph Zukor, Fox to name just a few, and continuing into recent times with such industry giants as super-agent Michael Ovitz, Michael Eisner, Lew Wasserman, Jeffrey Katzenberg, Steven Spielberg, and David Geffen. However, few of these brought a specifically Jewish sensibility either to the art of film or, with the sometime exception of Spielberg, to their choice of subject matter. The historian Eric Hobsbawm described the situation as follows:

It would be ... pointless to look for consciously Jewish elements in the songs of Irving Berlin or the Hollywood movies of the era of the great studios, all of which were run by immigrant Jews: their object, in which they succeeded, was precisely to make songs or films which found a specific expression for 100 per cent Americanness.

A more specifically Jewish sensibility can be seen in the films of the Marx Brothers, Mel Brooks, or Woody Allen; other examples of specifically Jewish films from the Hollywood film industry are the Barbra Streisand vehicle Yentl (1983), or John Frankenheimer's The Fixer (1968). More recently, Call Me By Your Name (2017) can be given as an example of a movie with Jewish sensibility. Jewish film festivals are nowadays conducted in many major cities around the world as vehicles of introducing such films to wider audiences, including among others the Boston JFF, San Francisco JFF, Jerusalem JFF, etc.

== Radio and television ==
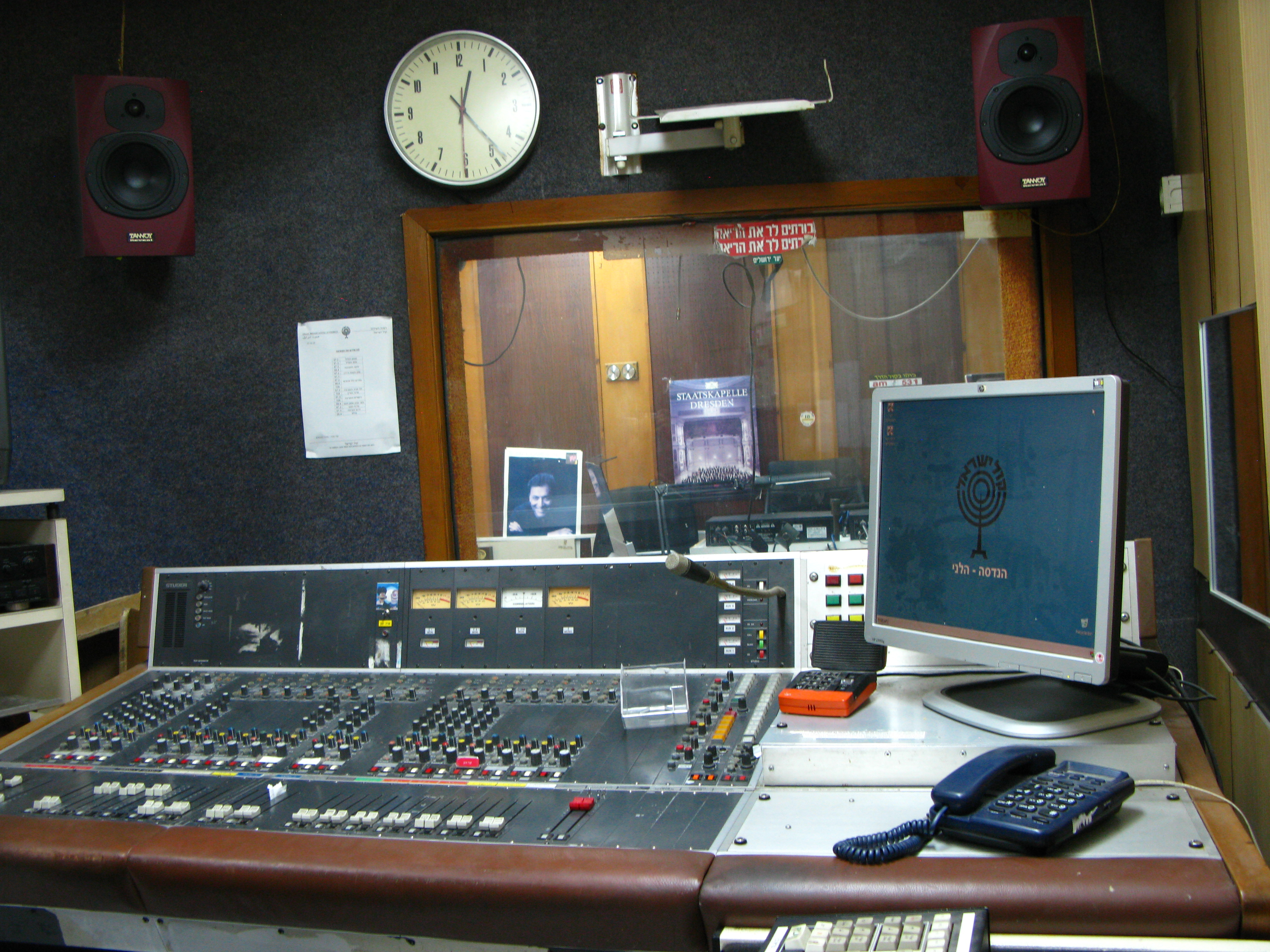
IBA Kol Israel Heleni Radio Studios

The first radio chains, the Radio Corporation of America and the Columbia Broadcasting System, were created by the Jewish American David Sarnoff and William S. Paley, respectively. These Jewish innovators were also among the first producers of televisions, both black-and-white and color. Among the Jewish immigrant communities of America there was also a thriving Yiddish language radio, with its "golden age" from the 1930s to the 1950s.

Although there is little specifically Jewish television in the United States (National Jewish Television, largely religious, broadcasts only three hours a week), Jews have been involved in American television from its earliest days. From Sid Caesar and Milton Berle to Joan Rivers, Gilda Radner, and Andy Kaufman to Billy Crystal to Jerry Seinfeld, Jewish stand-up comedians have been icons of American television. Other Jews that held a prominent role in early radio and television were Eddie Cantor, Al Jolson, Jack Benny, Walter Winchell and David Susskind. More figures are Larry King, Michael Savage and Howard Stern. In the analysis of Paul Johnson, "The Broadway musical, radio and TV were all examples of a fundamental principle in Jewish diaspora history: Jews opening up a completely new field in business and culture, a tabula rasa on which to set their mark, before other interests had a chance to take possession, erect guild or professional fortifications and deny them entry."

One of the first televised situation comedies, The Goldbergs was set in a specifically Jewish milieu in the Bronx. While the overt Jewish milieu of The Goldbergs was unusual for an American television series, there were a few other examples, such as Brooklyn Bridge (1991–1993) and Bridget Loves Bernie. Jews have also played an enormous role among the creators and writers of television comedies: Woody Allen, Mel Brooks, Selma Diamond, Larry Gelbart, Carl Reiner, and Neil Simon all wrote for Sid Caesar; Reiner's son Rob Reiner worked with Norman Lear on All in the Family (which often engaged antisemitism and other issues of prejudice); Larry David and Jerry Seinfeld created the hit sitcom Seinfeld; Lorne Michaels, Al Franken, Rosie Shuster, and Alan Zweibel of Saturday Night Live breathed new life into the variety show in the 1970s.

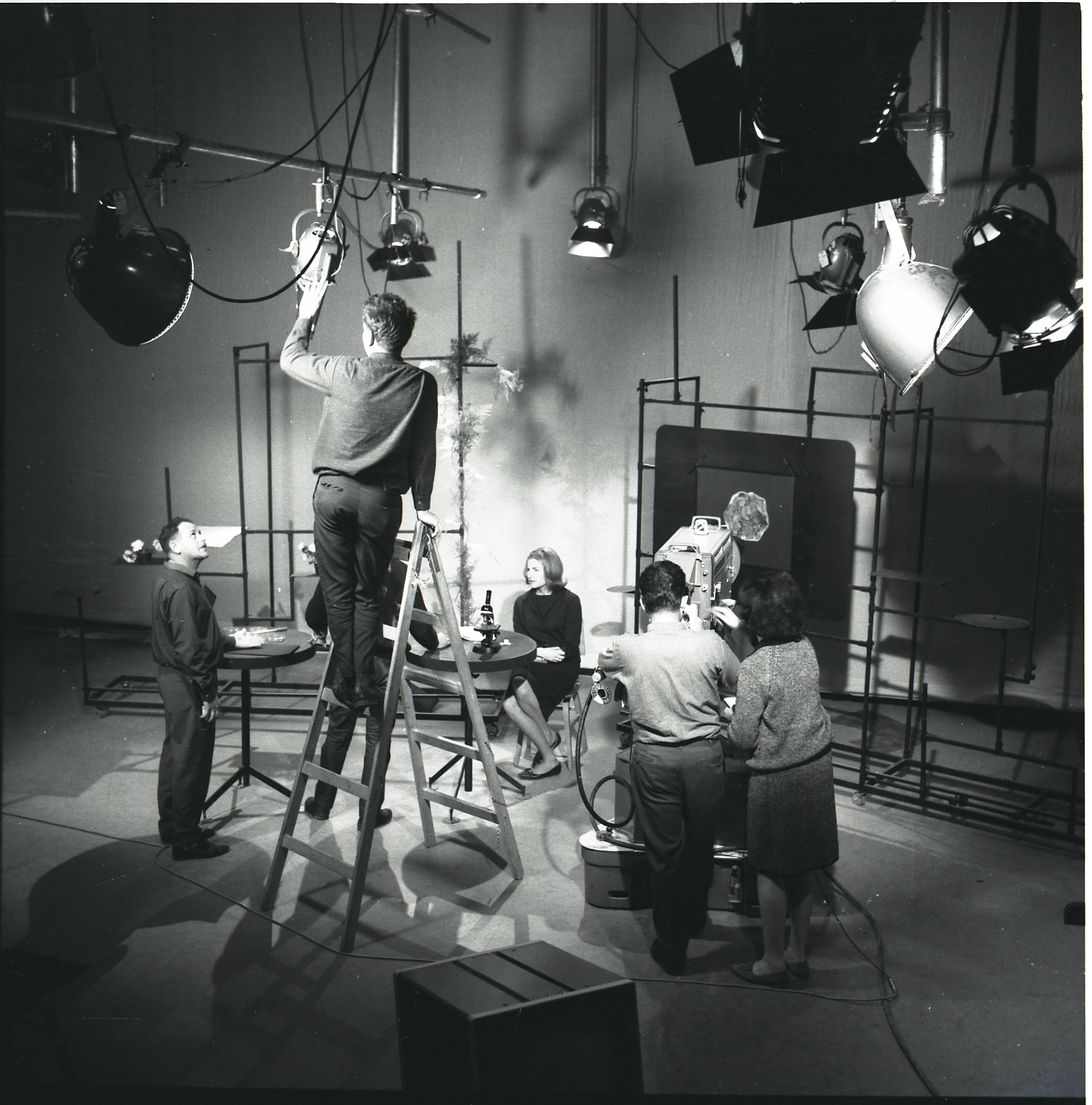
Israeli television studio in the 1950s

More recently, American Jews have been instrumental to "novelistic" television series such as The Wire and The Sopranos. Variously acclaimed as one of the greatest television series of all time, The Wire was created by David Simon. Simon also served as executive producer, head writer, and show runner. Matthew Weiner produced the fifth and sixth seasons of The Sopranos and later created Mad Men. More remarkable contributors are David Benioff and D. B. Weiss, creators of Game of Thrones TV series; Ron Leavitt co-creator of Married... with Children; Damon Lindelof and J. J. Abrams, co-creators of Lost; David Crane and Marta Kauffman, creators of Friends; Tim Kring creator of Heroes; Sydney Newman co-creator of Doctor Who; Darren Star, creator Sex and the City and Melrose Place; Aaron Spelling, co-creator of Beverly Hills, 90210; Chuck Lorre, co-creator of The Big Bang Theory and Two and a Half Men; Gideon Raff, creator of Prisoners of War which Homeland is based on; Aaron Ruben and Sheldon Leonard co-creators of The Andy Griffith Show; Don Hewitt creator of 60 Minutes; Garry Shandling, co-creator of The Larry Sanders Show; Ed. Weinberger, co-creator of The Cosby Show; David Milch, creator of Deadwood; Steven Levitan, co-creator of Modern Family; Dick Wolf, creator of Law & Order; David Shore, creator House; Max Mutchnick and David Kohan creators of Will & Grace; Adam Horowitz and Edward Kitsis creators of Once Upon a Time (TV Series). There is also a significant role of Jews in acting by actors such as Sarah Jessica Parker, William Shatner, Leonard Nimoy, Mila Kunis, Zac Efron, Hank Azaria, David Duchovny, Fred Savage, Zach Braff, Noah Wyle, Adam Brody, Katey Sagal, Sarah Michelle Gellar, Alyson Hannigan, Michelle Trachtenberg, David Schwimmer, Lisa Kudrow and Mayim Bialik.

== Music ==
Jewish musical contributions also tend to reflect the cultures of the countries in which Jews live, the most notable examples being classical and popular music in the United States and Europe. Some music, however, is unique to particular Jewish communities, such as Israeli music, Israeli folk music, Klezmer, Sephardic and Ladino music, and Mizrahi music.

=== Classical music ===
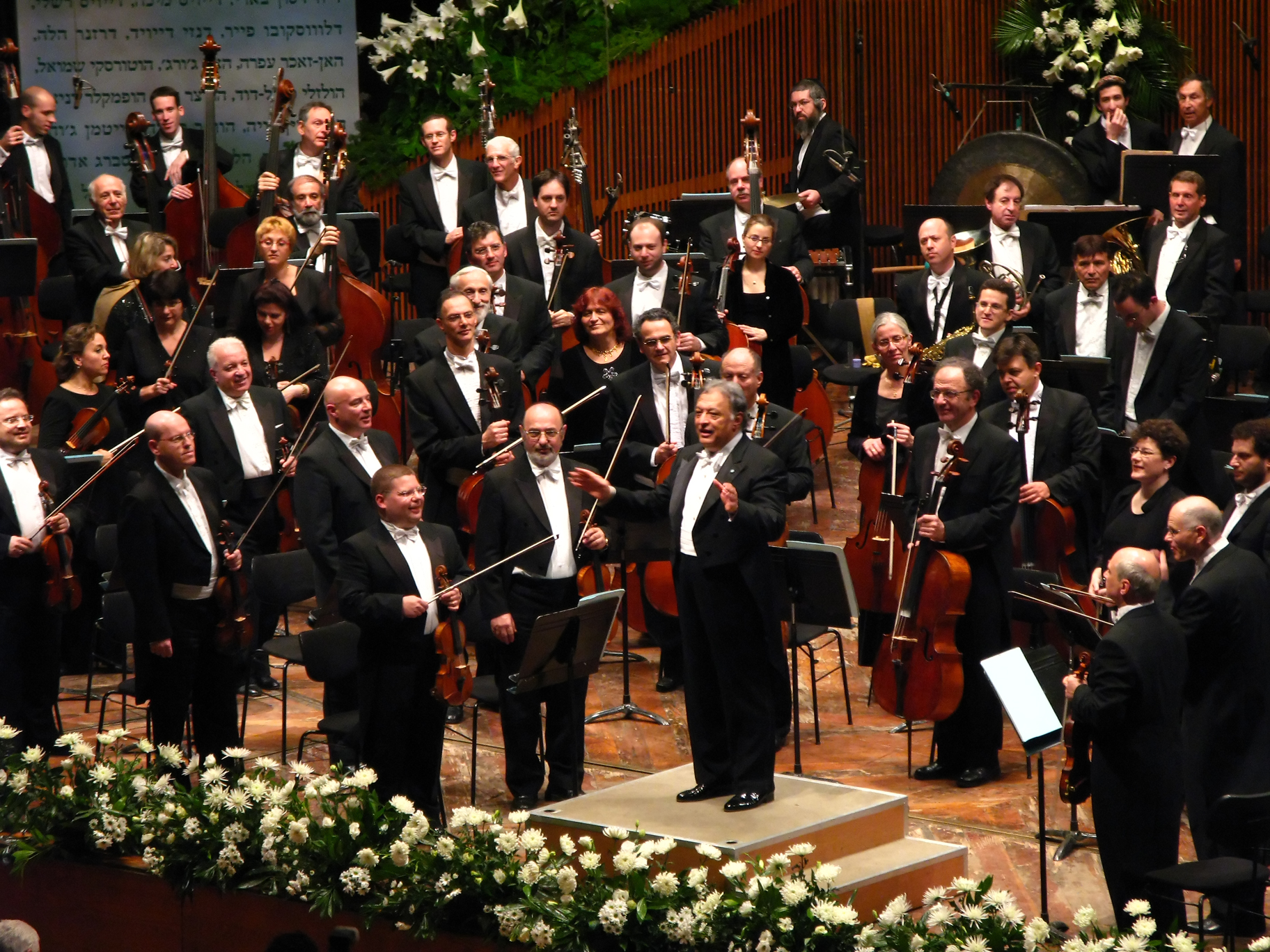
The Israel Philharmonic Orchestra's 70th Anniversary

Before Emancipation, virtually all Jewish music in Europe was sacred music, with the exception of the performances of klezmorim during weddings and other occasions. The result was a lack of a Jewish presence in European classical music until the 19th century, with a very few exceptions, normally enabled by specific aristocratic protection, such as Salamone Rossi and Claude Daquin (the work of the former is considered the beginning of "Jewish art music"). After Jews were admitted to mainstream society in England (gradually after their return in the 17th century), France, Austria-Hungary, the German Empire, and Russia (in that order), the Jewish contribution to the European music scene steadily increased, but in the form of mainstream European music, not specifically Jewish music. Notable examples of Jewish Romantic composers (by country) are Charles-Valentin Alkan, Paul Dukas and Fromental Halevy from France, Josef Dessauer, Karl Goldmark and Gustav Mahler from Bohemia (most Austrian Jews during this time were native not to what is today Austria but the outer provinces of the Empire), Felix Mendelssohn and Giacomo Meyerbeer from Germany, and Anton and Nikolai Rubinstein from Russia. Singers included John Braham and Giuditta Pasta. There were very many notable Jewish violin and pianist virtuosi, including Joseph Joachim, Ferdinand David, Carl Tausig, Henri Herz, Leopold Auer, Jascha Heifetz, and Ignaz Moscheles. During the 20th century the number of Jewish composers and notable instrumentalists increased, as did their geographical distribution. Sample Jewish 20th-century composers include Arnold Schoenberg and Alexander von Zemlinsky from Austria, Hanns Eisler and Kurt Weill from Germany, Viktor Ullmann and Jaromír Weinberger from Bohemia and later the Czech Republic (the former perished at the Auschwitz extermination camps), George Gershwin and Aaron Copland from the United States, Darius Milhaud and Alexandre Tansman from France, Alfred Schnittke and Lera Auerbach from Russia, Lalo Schifrin and Mario Davidovsky from Argentina and Paul Ben-Haim and Shulamit Ran from Israel. There are some genres and forms of classical music that Jewish composers have been associated with, including notably during the Romantic period French Grand Opera. The most prolific composers of this genre included Giacomo Meyerbeer, Fromental Halévy, and the later Jacques Offenbach; Halevy's La Juive was based on Scribe's libretto very loosely connected to the Jewish experience.

While orchestral and operatic music works by Jewish composers would in general be considered secular, many Jewish (as well as non-Jewish) composers have incorporated Jewish themes and motives into their music. Sometimes this is done covertly, such as the klezmer band music that many critics and observers believe lies in the third movement of Mahler's Symphony No. 1, and this type of Jewish reference was most common during the 19th century when openly displaying one's Jewishness would most likely hamper a Jew's chances at assimilation. During the 20th century, however, many Jewish composers wrote music with direct Jewish references and themes, e.g. David Amram (Symphony – "Songs of the Soul"), Leonard Bernstein (Kaddish Symphony, Chichester Psalms), Ernest Bloch (Schelomo), Arnold Schoenberg, Mario Castelnuovo-Tedesco (Violin Concerto no. 2) Kurt Weill (The Eternal Road) and Hugo Weisgall (Psalm of the Instant Dove).

Giacomo Meyerbeer (1791–1864)	Fanny Hensel (1805–1847)	Felix Mendelssohn (1809–1847)	Charles-Valentin Alkan (1813–1888)	Jacques Offenbach (1819–1880)	Anton Rubinstein (1829–1894)	Gustav Mahler (1860–1911)	Clara Haskil (1895–1960)

In the late twentieth century, prominent composers like Morton Feldman, György Ligeti or Alfred Schnittke made significant contributions to the history of contemporary music.

=== Popular music ===
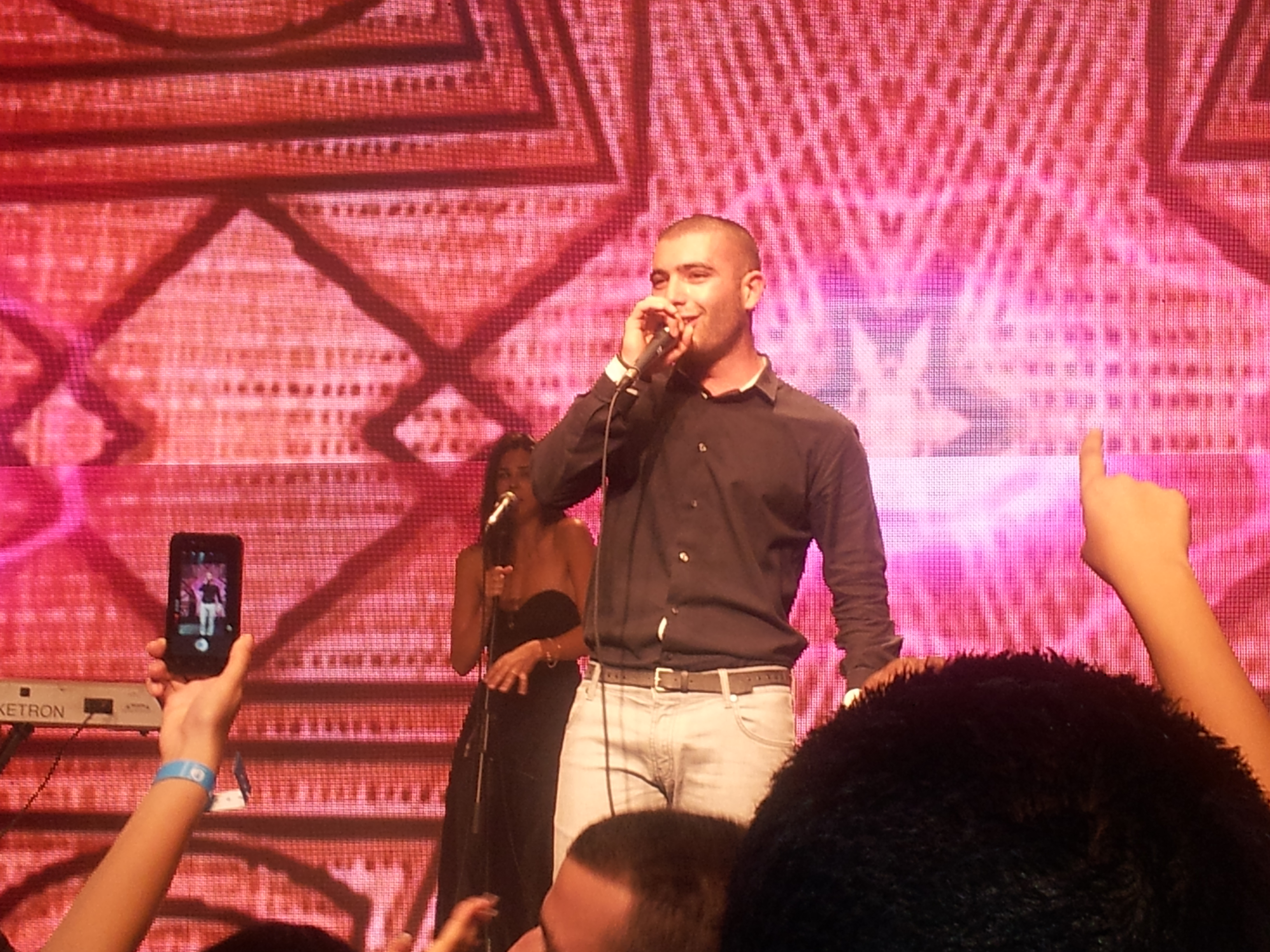
Omer Adam during a show in 2020

The great songwriters and lyricists of American traditional popular music and jazz standards were predominantly Jewish, including Harold Arlen, Jerome Kern, George Gershwin, Frank Loesser, Richard Rodgers and Irving Berlin. Popular music as of today for the Jewish World at large mainly stems from Israeli Music, more specifically Mizrahi Music. Popular Jewish artists today include Omer Adam, Noa Kirel, Avior Malasa, A-WA, Eden Alene, Eyal Golan, Debbie Friedman, Barbra Streisand and others.

== Dance ==
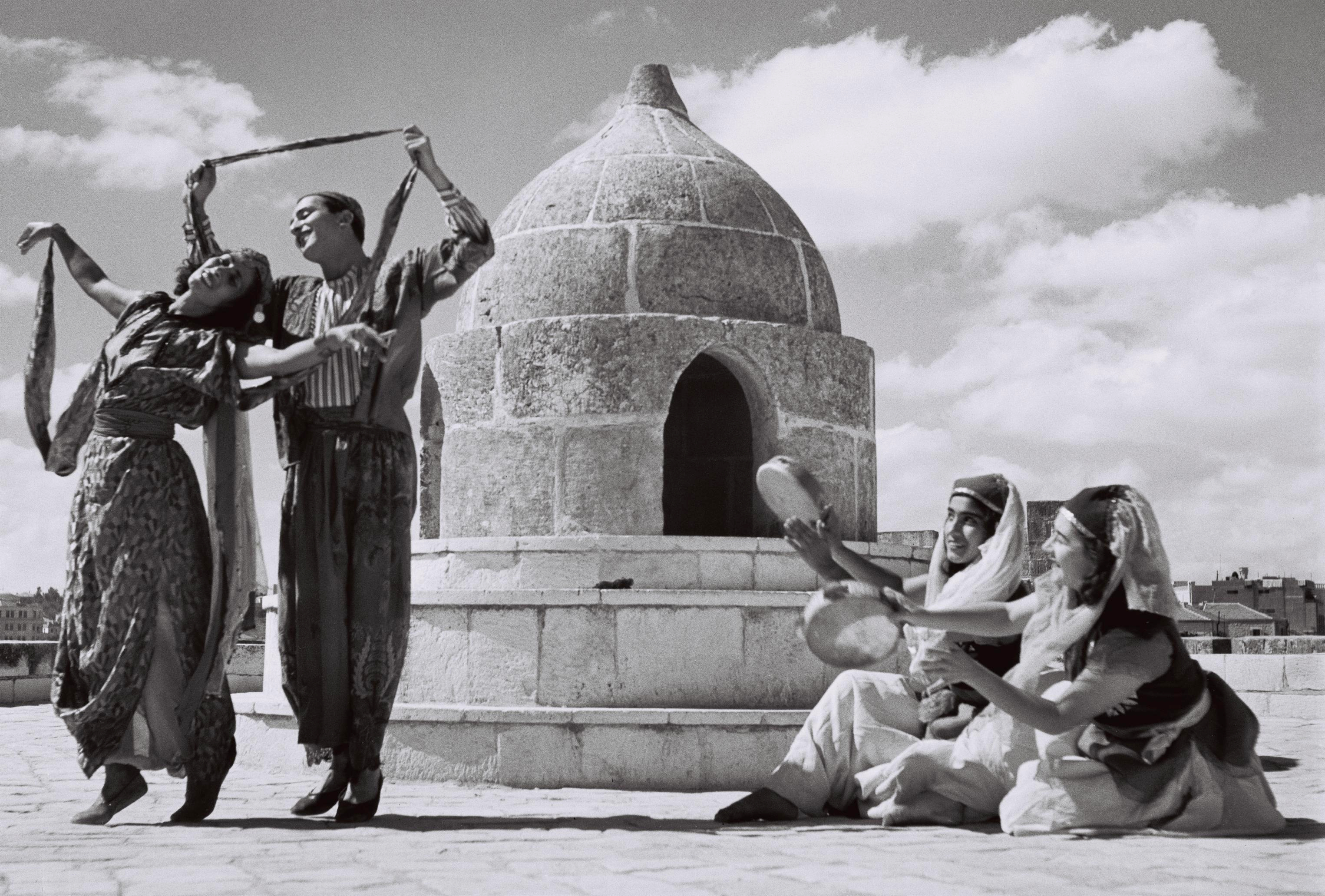
A Bukharan Jewish dance performed by members of the Rina Nikova ballet in the citadel of Jerusalem - 1 May 1946.

Deriving from Biblical traditions, Jewish dance has long been used by Jews as a medium for the expression of joy and other communal emotions. Each Jewish diasporic community developed its own dance traditions for wedding celebrations and other distinguished events. For Ashkenazi Jews in Eastern Europe, for example, dances, whose names corresponded to the different forms of klezmer music that were played, were an obvious staple of the wedding ceremony of the shtetl. Jewish dances both were influenced by surrounding Gentile traditions and Jewish sources preserved over time. "Nevertheless the Jews practiced a corporeal expressive language that was highly differentiated from that of the non-Jewish peoples of their neighborhood, mainly through motions of the hands and arms, with more intricate legwork by the younger men." In general, however, in most religiously traditional communities, members of the opposite sex dancing together or dancing at times other than at these events was frowned upon.

== Sport ==
Historically, Jews were often seen as unathletic. However, sport has played a role in integrating the Jewish diaspora into its local societies. For example, in the United States, the Jewish presence in baseball was important during a major wave of immigration in the early 20th century, and sport was used to shape the assimilation and community formation of both American and British Jews. Jews have dominated chess.

== Humor ==
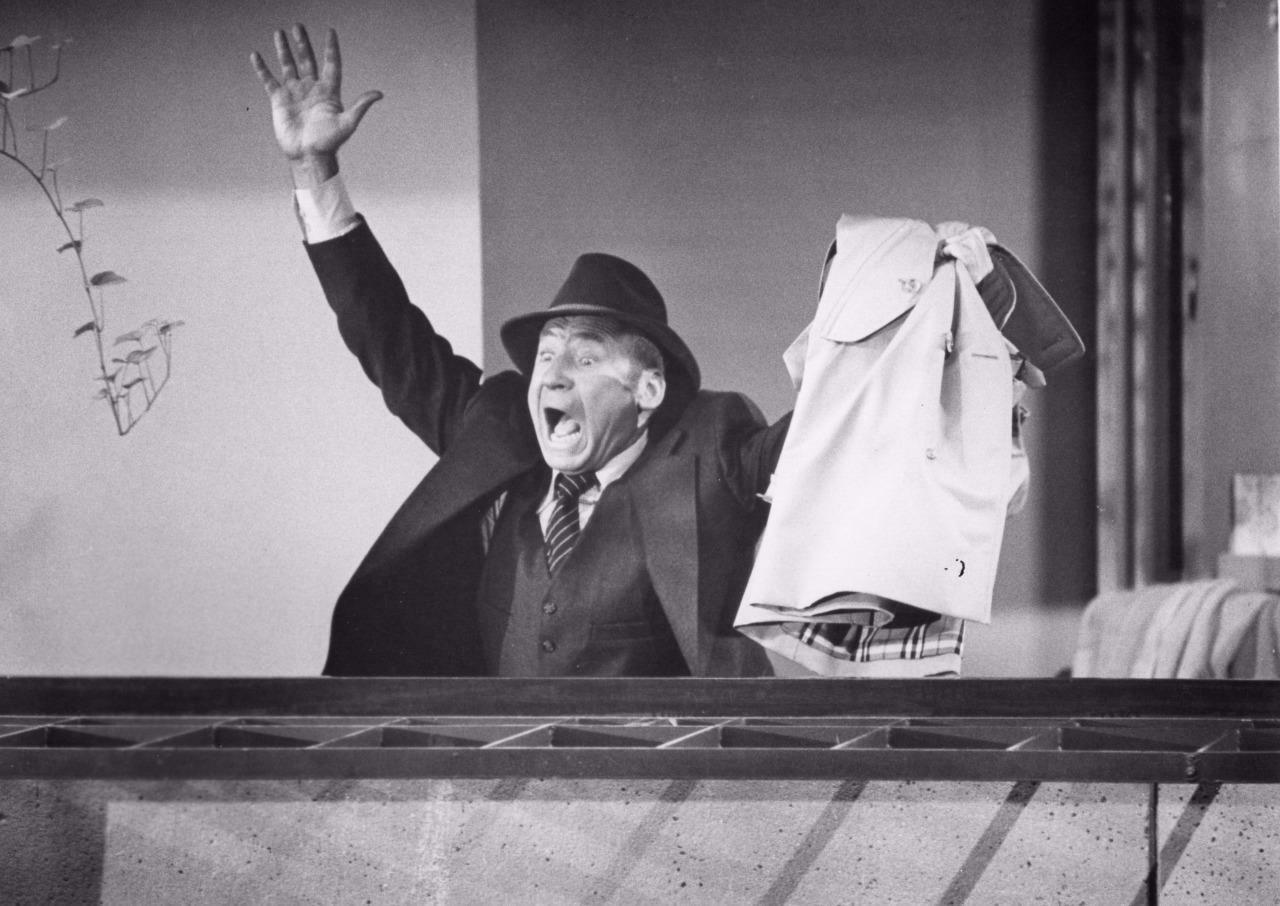
Mel Brooks in American satirical comedy film High Anxiety (1977).

Jewish humor is the long tradition of humor in Judaism dating back to the Torah and the Midrash, but generally refers to the more recent stream of verbal, frequently self-deprecating and often anecdotal humor originating in Europe. Jewish humor took root in the United States over the last hundred years, beginning with vaudeville, and continuing through radio, stand-up, film, and television. A significant number of American comedians have been or are Jewish. Notable Jewish American comedians include Mel Brooks, Woody Allen, Jerry Seinfeld, Larry David, Sammy Davis Jr, Rodney Dangerfield, Rachel Dratch, Gilbert Gottfried, Ilana Glazer, Jan Murray, Julie Klausner, Don Rickles, Andy Samberg, Gene Wilder, Groucho Marx, Gianmarco Soresi, Ben Schwartz, and many others.

== Visual arts ==
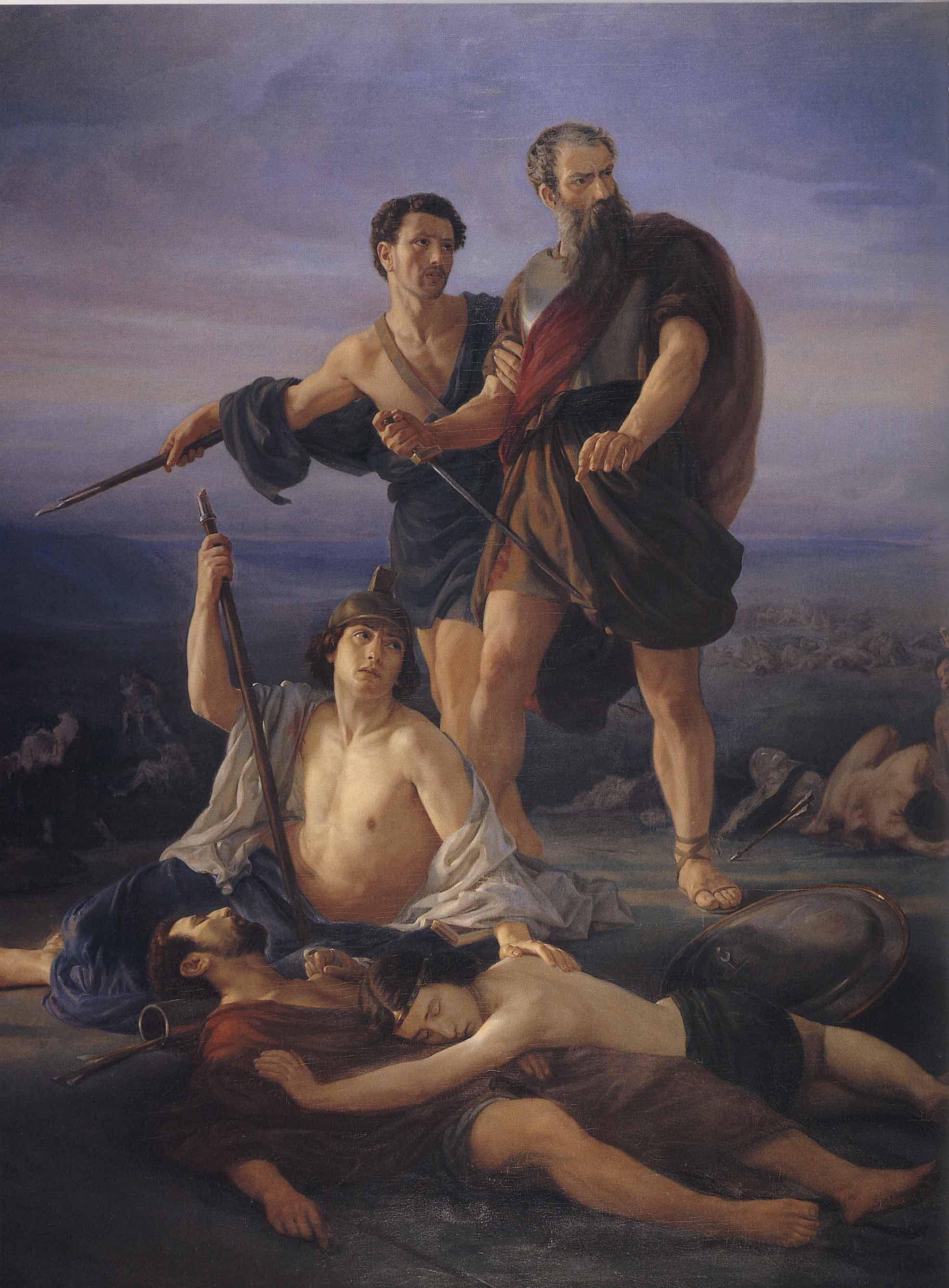
"Death of King Saul", by Elie Marcuse (1848). (Tel Aviv Museum of Art)

Despite fears by early religious communities of art being used for idolatrous purposes, Jewish sacred art is recorded in the Tanakh and extends throughout Jewish Antiquity and the Middle Ages. The Tabernacle and the two Temples in Jerusalem form the first known examples of "Jewish art". During the first centuries of the Common Era, Jewish religious art also was created in regions surrounding the Mediterranean such as Syria and Greece, including frescoes on the walls of synagogues, of which the Dura Europas Synagogue was the only survivor, prior to its destruction by ISIL in 2017, as well as the Jewish catacombs in Rome.

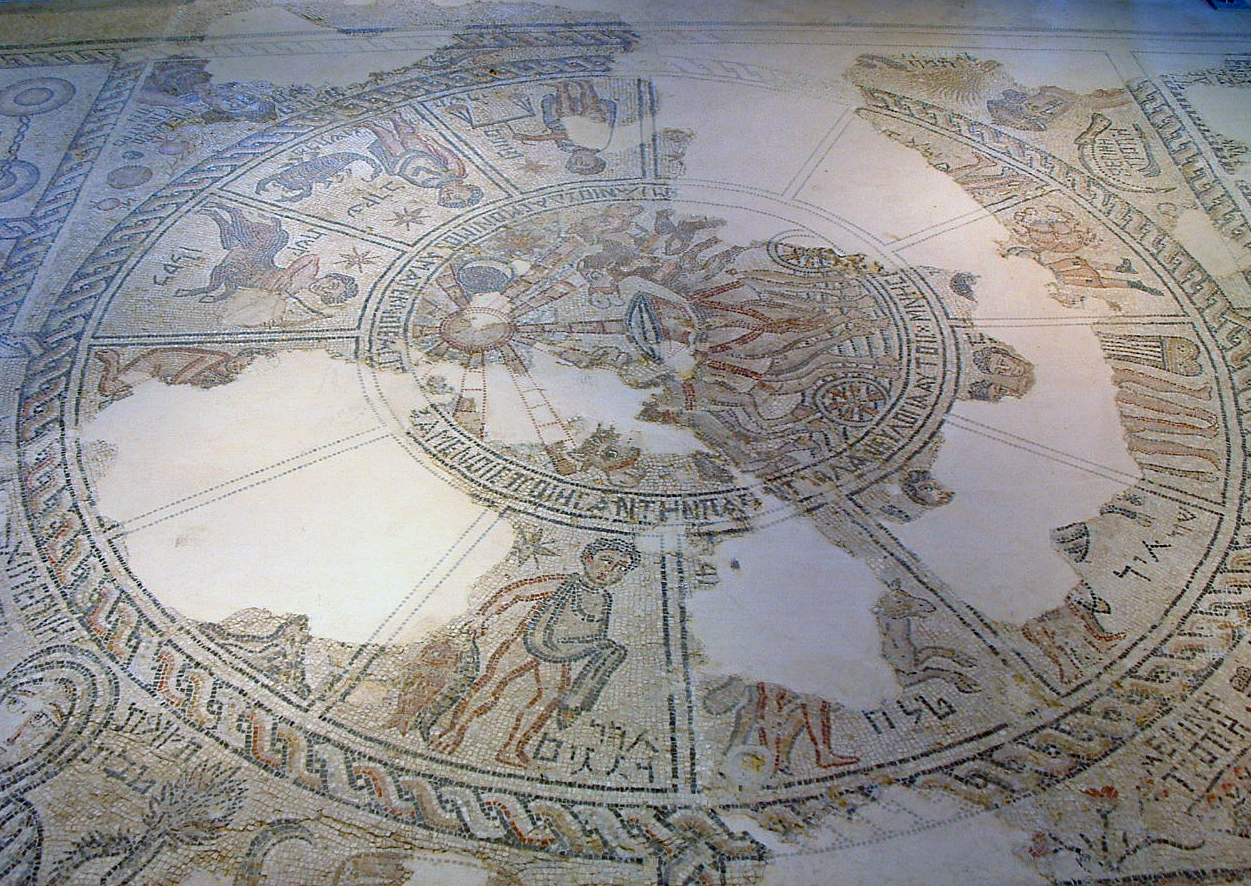
Zodiac Wheel Mosaic in the great synagogue of Tzippori (5th century) in Galilee, Israel

A number of luxury pieces of gold glass from the later Roman period have Jewish motifs. Several Hellenistic-style floor mosaics have also been excavated in synagogues from late antiquity in Israel and Palestine, especially of the signs of the Zodiac, which was apparently acceptable in a low-status position on the floor. Some, such as that at Naaran, show evidence of a reaction against images of living creatures around 600 CE. The decoration of sarcophagi and walls at the cave cemetery at Beit She'arim shows a mixture of Jewish and Hellenistic motifs.

Middle Age Rabbinical and Kabbalistic literature also contain textual and graphic art, most famously illuminated haggadahs such as the Sarajevo Haggadah, and other manuscripts like the Nuremberg Mahzor. Some of these were illustrated by Jewish artists and some by Christians; equally some Jewish artists and craftsmen in various media worked on Christian commissions. Outside of Europe, Yemenite Jewish silversmiths developed a distinctive style of finely wrought silver that is admired for its artistry. Johnson again summarizes this sudden change from a limited participation by Jews in visual art (as in many other arts) to a large movement by them into this branch of European cultural life:

Again, the arrival of the Jewish artist was a strange phenomenon. It is true that, over the centuries, there had been many animals (though few humans) depicted in Jewish art: lions on Torah curtains, owls on Judaic coins, animals on the Capernaum capitals, birds on the rim of the fountain-basis in the 5th century Naro synagogue in Tunis; there were carved animals, too, on timber synagogues in eastern Europe – indeed the Jewish wood-carver was the prototype of the modern Jewish plastic artist. A book of Yiddish folk-ornament, printed at Vitebsk in 1920, was similar to Chagall's own bestiary. But the resistance of pious Jews to portraying the living human image was still strong at the beginning of the 20th century.

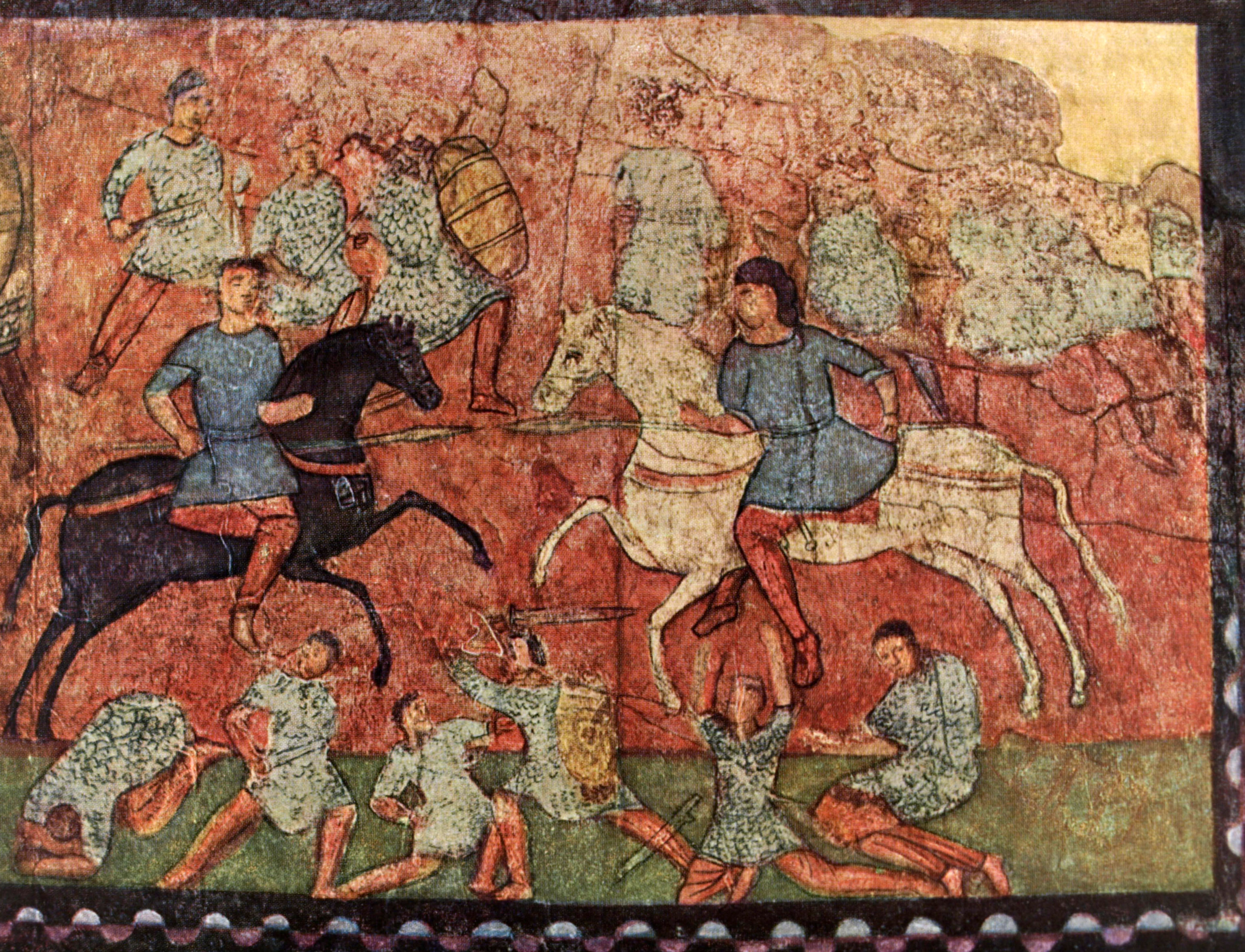
Wall painting in the Dura Europos synagogue, circa 250 CE

There were few Jewish secular artists in Europe prior to the Emancipation that spread throughout Europe with the Napoleonic conquests. There were exceptions, and Salomon Adler was a prominent portrait painter in 18th-century Milan. The delay in participation in the visual arts parallels the lack of Jewish participation in European classical music until the nineteenth century, and which was progressively overcome with the rise of Modernism in the 20th century. There were many Jewish artists in the 19th century, but Jewish artistic activity boomed during the end of World War I. The Jewish artistic Renaissance has its roots in the 1901 Fifth Zionist Congress, which included an art exhibition featuring Jewish artists E.M. Lilien and Hermann Struck. The exhibition helped legitimize art as an expression of Jewish culture. According to Nadine Nieszawer, "Until 1905, Jews were always plunged into their books but from the first Russian Revolution, they became emancipated, committed themselves in politics and became artists. A real Jewish cultural rebirth". Individual Jews figured in the modern artistic movements of Europe— With the exception of those living in isolated Jewish communities, most Jews listed here as contributing to secular Jewish culture also participated in the cultures of the peoples they lived with and nations they lived in. In most cases, however, the work and lives of these people did not exist in two distinct cultural spheres but rather in one that incorporated elements of both.

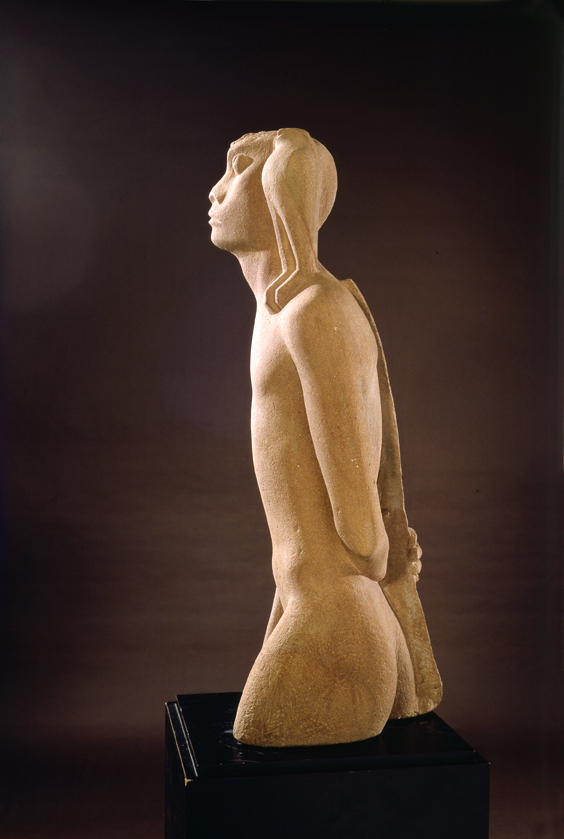
Itzhak Danziger"Nimrod", 1939 The Israel Museum, Jerusalem Collection

During the early 20th century, Jews figured particularly prominently in the École de Paris centered in the Montparnasse movement (including Chaim Soutine, Marc Chagall, Jules Pascin, Yitzhak Frenkel Frenel and Michel Kikoine), and after World War II among the abstract expressionists: Alexander Bogen, Helen Frankenthaler, Adolph Gottlieb, Philip Guston, Al Held, Lee Krasner, Barnett Newman, Milton Resnick, Jack Tworkov, Mark Rothko, and Louis Schanker, as well as among Contemporary artists, Modernists and Postmodernists. Many Russian Jews were prominent in the art of scenic design, particularly the aforementioned Chagall and Aronson, as well as the revolutionary Léon Bakst, who like the other two also painted. One Mexican Jewish artist was Pedro Friedeberg; historians disagree as to whether Frida Kahlo's father was Jewish or Lutheran. A prominent Slovak artist Dominik Skutecký was also Jewish. Among major artists Chagall may be the most specifically Jewish in his themes. But as art fades into graphic design, Jewish names and themes become more prominent: Leonard Baskin, Al Hirschfeld, Peter Max, Ben Shahn, Art Spiegelman and Saul Steinberg.

The collage artist Wallace Berman's engagement with Hebrew reflected the Beat Generation's wider exploration of esoteric spiritual practices such as Zen, palm reading, astrology, kabbalah and psychedelic drugs. Born on Staten Island, Berman moved to Los Angeles where the Hebrew letters on storefront windows and in Yiddish-language newspapers fascinated him. According to historian Richard Candida Smith, "Berman's interest in the Hebrew alphabet and its functions in Jewish mysticism was part of an effort to reclaim his ethnic identity." In 1989, the painter R.B. Kitaj published his "First Diasporist Manifesto", a short book in which he analysed how his art was based on his alienation as a Jew born in Cleveland, Ohio and living in London. In 2007, a second illustrated stream of consciousness book followed, "The Second Diasporist Manifesto."

Jews have also played a very important role in media other than painting; their involvement in sculpture came rather later, perhaps due to lingering feelings against "graven images". But there were many notable Jewish sculptors in the later 19th and 20th centuries, including Moses Jacob Ezekiel (American, d 1917), Sir Jacob Epstein (American-British, d 1959), Ossip Zadkine (French, d 1967) Naum Gabo (Russian, d 1977), Oscar Nemon (Croatian, d 1985), Louise Nevelson (American, d 1988), Herbert Ferber (American, d 1991).

Camille Pissarro (1830–1903)	Amedeo Modigliani (1884–1920)	Diego Rivera (1886–1957)	Alexander Bogen (1916–2010)	Marc Chagall (1887–1985)	Isaac Frenkel Frenel (1899–1981)	Chaïm Soutine 1893–1943

=== Photography ===
In photography some notable figures are André Kertész, Robert Frank, Helmut Newton, Garry Winogrand, Cindy Sherman, Steve Lehman, and Adi Nes; in installation art and street art some notable figures are Sigalit Landau, Dede, and Michal Rovner.

== Comics, cartoons, and animation ==
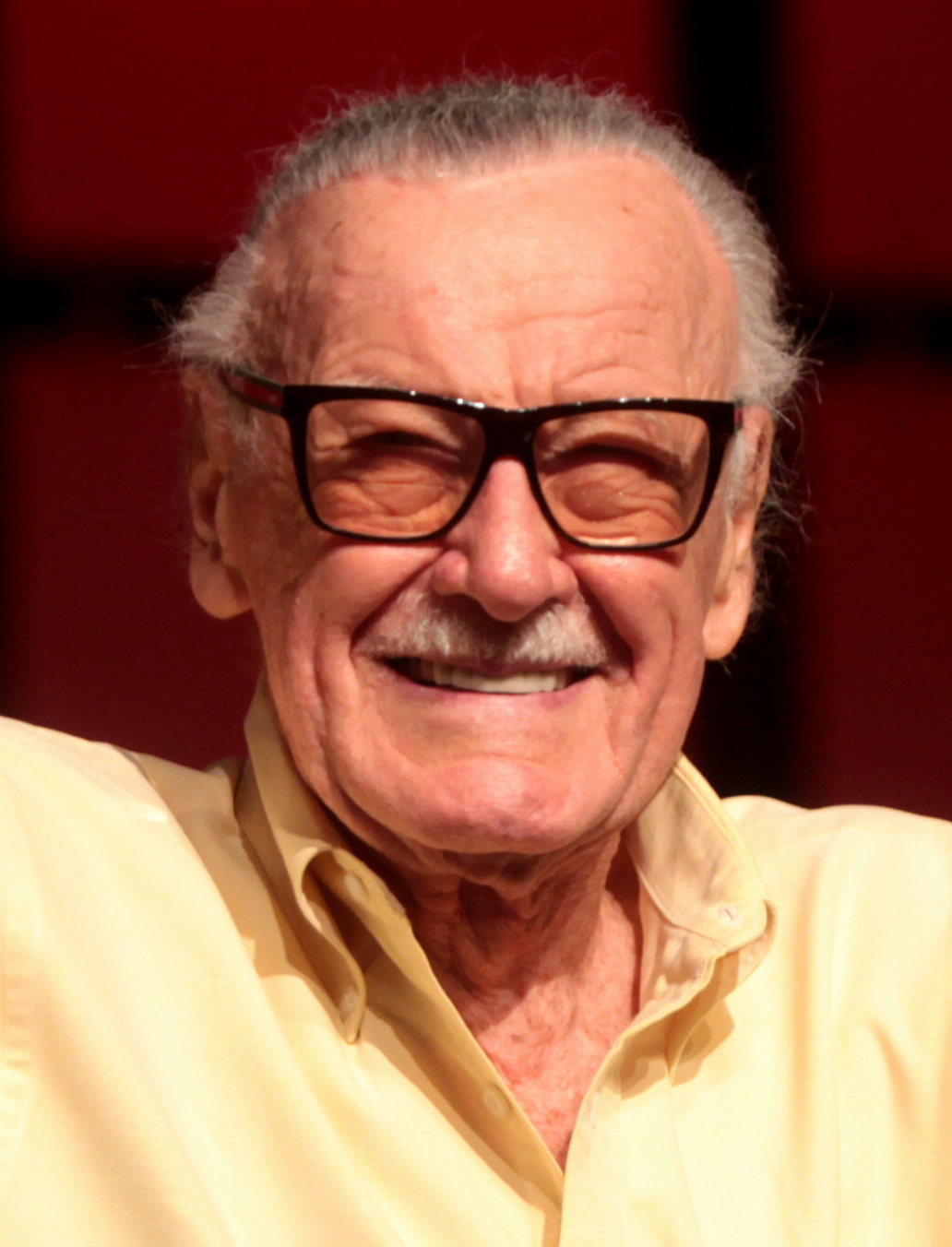
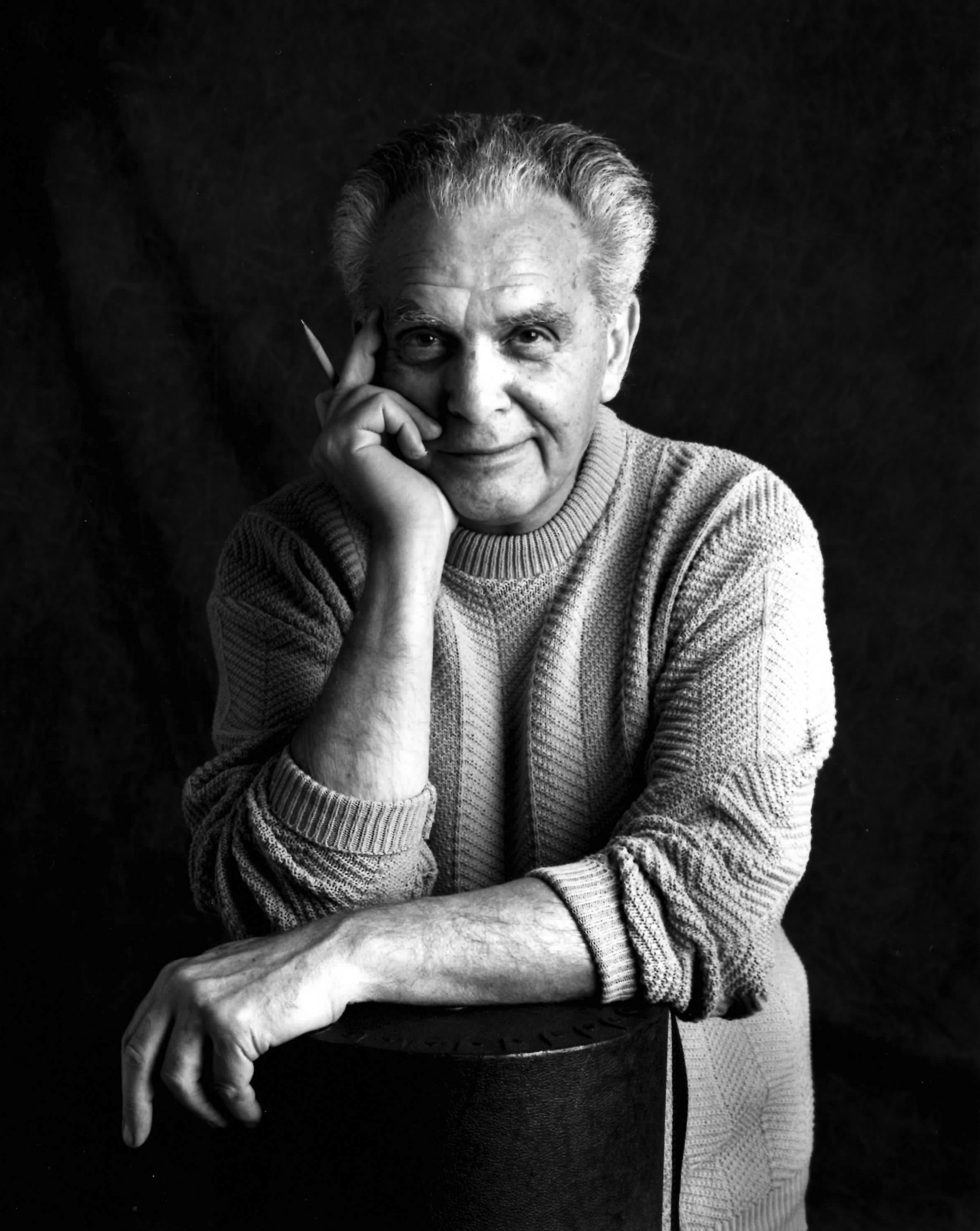
Stan Lee (left) and Jack Kirby (right) made a major contribution to the American comic book industry. Their work includes The Avengers, Captain America, Fantastic Four, Spider-Man, and X-Men

Graphic art, as expressed in the art of comics, has been a key field for Jewish artists as well. In the Golden and Silver ages of American comic books, the Jewish role was overwhelming and a large number of the medium's foremost creators have been Jewish.

Max Gaines was a pioneering figure in the creation of the modern comic book when in 1935 he published the first one called Famous Funnies. In 1939, he founded, with Jack Liebowitz and Harry Donenfeld, All-American Publications (the AA Group). The publication is known for the creation of several superheroes such as the original Atom, Flash, Green Lantern, Hawkman, and Wonder Woman. Donenfeld and Liebowitz were also the owners of National Allied Publications which distributed Detective Comics and Action Comics. That company was also a precursor of DC Comics.

In 1939, the pulp magazine publisher Martin Goodman formed Timely Publications, a company to be known, since the 1960s, as Marvel Comics. At Marvel, Artists such as Stan Lee, Jack Kirby, Larry Lieber and Joe Simon created a large variety of characters and cultural icons including Spider-Man, Hulk, Captain America, Iron Man, Thor, Daredevil, and the teams Fantastic Four, Avengers, X-Men (including many of its characters) and S.H.I.E.L.D.. Stan Lee attributed the Jewish role in comics to the Jewish culture.

At DC Comics Jewish role was significant as well; the character of Superman, which was created by the Jewish artists Joe Shuster and Jerry Siegel, is partly based on the biblical figure of Samson. It was also suggested the Superman is partly influenced by Moses, and other Jewish elements. More at DC Comics are Bob Kane, Bill Finger and Martin Nodell, creators of Green Lantern, Batman and many related characters as Robin, The Joker, Riddler, Scarecrow and Catwoman; Gil Kane, co-creator of Atom and Iron Fist. Many of those involved in the later ages of comics are also Jewish, such as Julius Schwartz, Joe Kubert, Jenette Kahn, Len Wein, Peter David, Neil Gaiman, Chris Claremont and Brian Michael Bendis. There is also a large number of Jewish characters among comics superheroes such as Magneto, Quicksilver, Kitty Pryde, The Thing, Sasquatch, Sabra, Ragman, Legion, and Moon Knight, of whom were and are influenced by events in Jewish history and elements of Jewish life.

In 1944, Max Gaines founded EC Comics. The company is known for specializing in horror fiction, crime fiction, satire, military fiction and science fiction from the 1940s through the mid-1950s, notably the Tales from the Crypt series, The Haunt of Fear, The Vault of Horror, Crime SuspenStories and Shock SuspenStories. Jewish artists that are associated with the publisher include Al Feldstein, Dave Berg, and Jack Kamen.

Will Eisner was an American cartoonist and was known as one of the earliest cartoonists to work in the American comic book industry. He is the creator of the Spirit comics series and the graphic novel A Contract with God. The Eisner Award was named in his honor, and is given to recognize achievements each year in the comics medium.

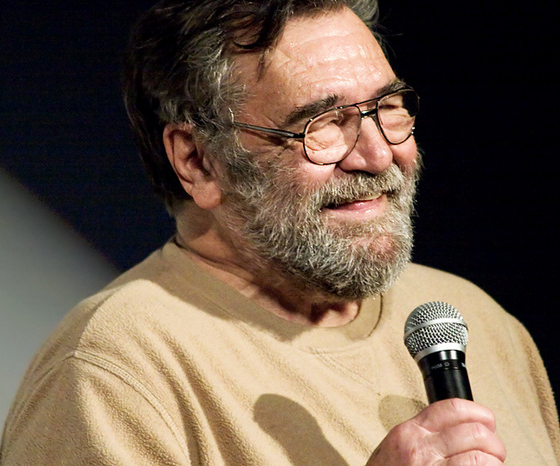
Ralph Bakshi is a director of animated and live-action films, known for films such as Wizards (1977), The Lord of the Rings (1978), and Fire and Ice (1983)

In 1952, William Gaines and Harvey Kurtzman founded Mad, an American humor magazine. It was widely imitated and influential, affecting satirical media as well as the cultural landscape of the 20th century, with editor Al Feldstein increasing readership to more than two million during its 1970s circulation peak. Other known cartoonists are Lee Falk creator of The Phantom and Mandrake the Magician; The Hebrew comics of Michael Netzer creator of Uri-On and Uri Fink creator of Zbeng!; William Steig, creator of Shrek!; Daniel Clowes, creator of Eightball; Art Spiegelman creator of graphic novel Maus and Raw (with Françoise Mouly).

In animation, there were many Jewish animators: Genndy Tartakovsky is the creator of several animation TV series such as Dexter's Laboratory and Samurai Jack; Matt Stone co-creator of South Park; David Hilberman, who helped animate Bambi and Snow White and the Seven Dwarfs; Friz Freleng, Looney Tunes; C. H. Greenblatt, Chowder; and Harvey Beaks; Ralph Bakshi, Fritz the Cat, Mighty Mouse: The New Adventures, Wizards, The Lord of the Rings, Heavy Traffic, Coonskin, Hey Good Lookin', Fire and Ice, and Cool World; Alex Hirsch, creator of Gravity Falls; Dave Fleischer and Lou Fleischer, founders of Fleischer Studios; Max Fleischer, animation of Betty Boop, Popeye and Superman; Rebecca Sugar, creator of Steven Universe. Several companies producing animation were founded by Jews, such as DreamWorks, which its products include Shrek, Madagascar, Kung Fu Panda and The Prince of Egypt; Warner Bros., whose animation division is known for cartoons such as Looney Tunes, Tiny Toon Adventures, Animaniacs, Pinky and the Brain and Freakazoid! .

== Cuisine ==
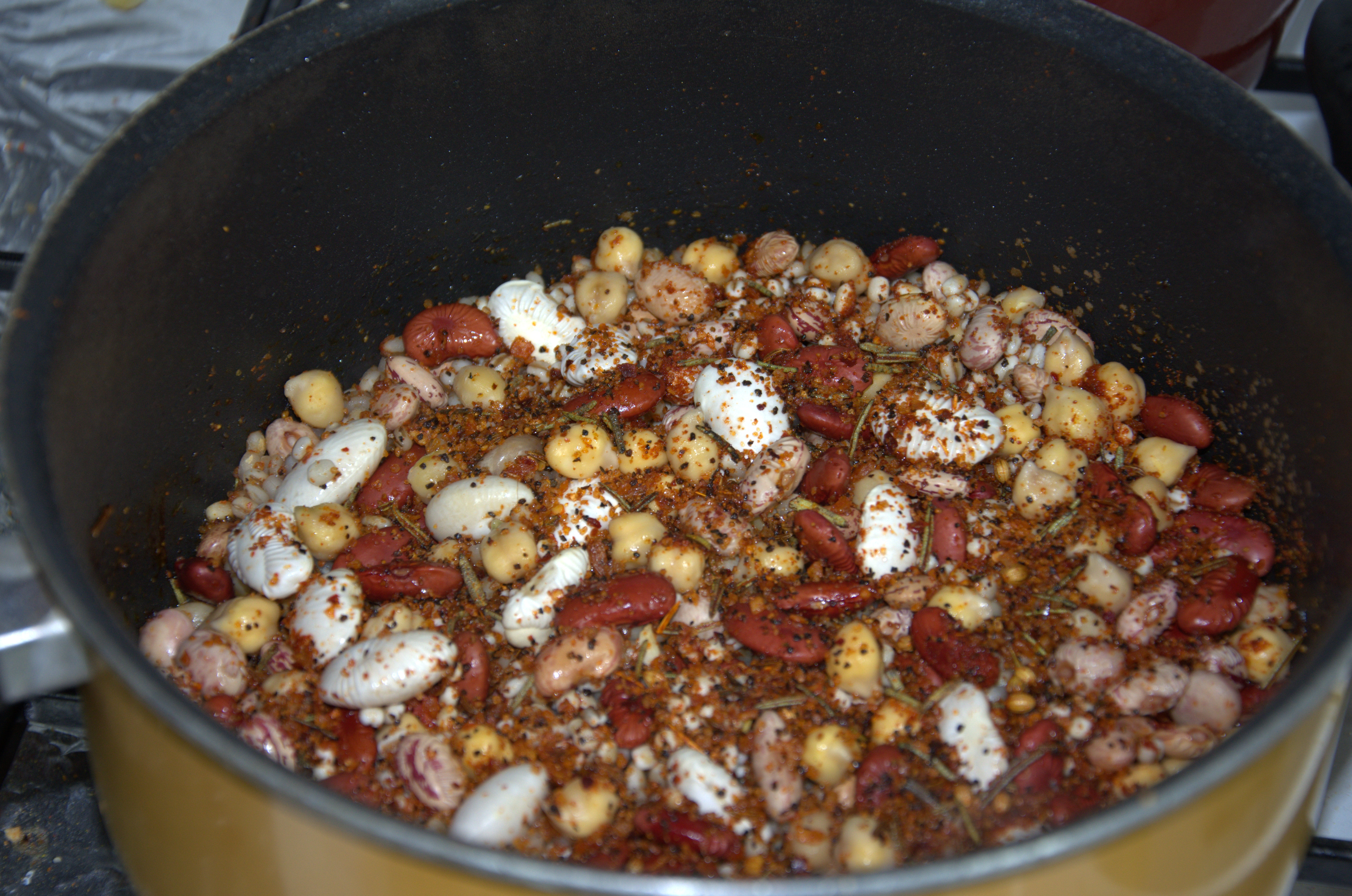
Khamin Stew -- A Sephardic Jewish variation of Cholent

Jewish cooking combines the food of many cultures in which Jews have lived, including Middle Eastern, Mediterranean, Spanish, German and Eastern European styles of cooking, all influenced by the need for food to be kosher. Thus, Jewish foods like bagels, hummus, stuffed cabbage, and blintzes are all influenced by the culinary preferences of communities in which Jews have settled. The amalgam of these foods, plus uniquely Jewish contributions like tzimmis, cholent, Malawach and Matzah balls, make up a variety of Jewish cuisine.

== Philo-Semitism ==
Philo-Semitism (also spelled philosemitism) or Judeophilia is an interest in, respect for and an appreciation, or in some cases a fetishization, of Jewish people, their history, and their culture and the influence of Judaism, particularly on the part of a gentile. Within the Jewish community, philo-Semitism includes an interest in Jewish culture and a love of things that are considered Jewish.

Very few Jews live in East Asian countries, but Jews are viewed in an especially positive light in some of them, partly owing to their shared wartime experiences during the Second World War. Examples include South Korea and China. In general, Jews are positively stereotyped as being intelligent, business savvy and committed to family values and responsibilities, but in the Western world, the first of the two aforementioned stereotypes more frequently have the negatively interpreted equivalents of guile and greed. In South Korean primary schools, students are required to read the Talmud.

== See also ==
- Culture of Israel
- Visual arts in Israel
- Humanistic Judaism
- Jewish folklore
- Jewish studies
- Jews and Christmas
- Secular Culture & Ideas
- Traditional Jewish chronology
- Islam in Jerusalem
- Yiddishkeit
- Islamic–Jewish relations
- Gerim

== Sources ==
- Alexandrov, Pavel S. (1981). "In Memory of Emmy Noether". In Brewer, James W; Smith, Martha K. (eds.). Emmy Noether: A Tribute to Her Life and Work. New York: Marcel Dekker. pp. 99–111. ISBN 978-0-8247-1550-2. OCLC 7837628.
