= Galante =

Galante is a surname. Notable people with the surname include:

- Galante (pedigree), a family of Jewish scholars which flourished in the Middle Ages
  - Abraham ben Mordecai Galante (died 1560), kabalist and author
  - Mordecai Galante (died 1781), rabbi of Damascus
  - Moses Galante (died 1806), rabbi of Damascus
  - Moses Galante (the Elder) (or Moshe ben Mordechai Galante; died 1608), rabbi, disciple of Joseph Caro
  - Moses Galante (the Younger) (or Moshe ben Yonatan Galante; 1621–1689), rabbi
  - Mordecai Galante (died 1781), Chief rabbi of Damascus and author of Gedullat Mordekai
  - Moses Galante (died 1806), chief rabbi of Damascus
- Andrea Galante (born 1982), Argentine actress
- Anyela Galante Salerno (born 1991), Venezuelan model and beauty pageant titleholder
- Carmine Galante (1910–1979), a member of the Bonanno crime family
- Cecilia (Plummer) Galante, American author
- Fabio Galante (born 1973), Italian footballer
- Forrest Galante (born 1988), American outdoor adventurer, wildlife biologist, and television personality
- Giuseppe Galante (born 1937), Italian rower
- Inese Galante, Latvian opera singer
- James Galante (born 1953), a member of the Bonanno crime family
- Joe Galante, American music industry executive
- Jose "Pepe" Galante, Argentine winemaker in the Uco Valley, Mendoza
- Joseph Anthony Galante (1938–2019), American Roman Catholic bishop
- Matt Galante (born 1944), American baseball player and manager
- Sala Galante Burton (1925–1987), Polish-born American politician
- Severino Galante (ca. 1750–1827), Italian painter
- Svetlana Galante (born 1973), Russian judoka and a sambo practitioner
- Theodore Galante (born 1956), American architect
- Tiago Daniel Galante Cruz (born 1995), Portuguese futsal player
- Virginia Galante Garrone (1906–1998), Italian writer

== See also ==
- 6241 Galante, a main-belt asteroid
- Galante music, the period of the 18th century in classical music between the Baroque and Classical periods
- Fête galante, a painting style
