= Comfort (disambiguation) =

Comfort is the physical and psychological sense of ease.

Comfort may also refer to:

== Places ==
=== United States ===
- Comfort, North Carolina
- Comfort, Texas
- Comfort, West Virginia
- Comfort, Wisconsin
- Comfort Lake, a lake in Minnesota
- Comfort Township, Kanabec County, Minnesota
- Old Point Comfort, Virginia
- Point Comfort, Texas

== People ==
=== Surname ===
- A. B. Comfort (1884–1974), American politician
- Alex Comfort (1920–2000), British medical professional, anarchist, pacifist, and writer
- Anna Manning Comfort (1845–1931), American physician
- Charles Comfort (1900–1994), Canadian painter, sculptor, teacher, writer, and administrator
- Lance Comfort (1908–1966), English film director
- Nathaniel C. Comfort (born 1962), American historian
- Pat Comfort (1930–2006), American politician
- Philip Comfort (1950–2022), American professor and writer
- Ray Comfort (born 1949), New Zealand-born minister and evangelist

=== Given name ===
- Comfort Arthur, British-born Ghanaian animator
- Comfort Asamoah, Ghanaian politician
- Comfort Freeman, Liberian Lutheran activist
- Comfort Omoge, Nigerian musician
- Comfort Owusu (born 1940), Ghanaian politician
- Comfort Selemani (born 2004), Zambian football midfielder
- Comfort Starr (1589–1659), English physician
- Louis Comfort Tiffany (1848–1933), American artist and designer
- Comfort Tyler (1764-1827), one of the original settlers of modern Syracuse, New York
- Comfort Yeates (born 2005), British trampoline gymnast

== Arts, entertainment, and media ==
- Comfort (Failure album)
- Comfort (magazine), an American mail-order periodical 1888–1942
- Comfort (Maya Jane Coles album)
- Comfort (Splashh album)
- "Comfort", a song by Basement from their album Colourmeinkindness (2012)
- "Comfort", a song by Deb Talan
- Comfort Jones, character on UK TV show Casualty
- Comfort Women: A New Musical, a musical about Korean comfort women, written and directed by Dimo Hyun Jun Kim
- "Uncomfy" (song), a song by Xaviersobased featuring OsamaSon, 2025

== Brands and enterprises ==
- Comfort (fabric softener)
- Comfort, a taxi company under ComfortDelGro
- Comfort Inn, a hospitality company owned by Choice Hotels International
- Southern Comfort (often abbreviated SoCo), an American whiskey liqueur
- Toyota Comfort, a taxicab in Japan and Hong Kong

== Ships ==
- MOL Comfort, a container ship; one of the biggest shipwrecks ever
- USS Comfort (AH-3) (1917–1921), a United States Navy hospital ship
- USS Comfort (AH-6) (1943–1946), a United States Navy hospital ship
- USNS Comfort (1975–present), an American hospital ship

== Other uses ==
- Comfort food, food that has a nostalgic or sentimental value
- Comfort noise, the artificial background noise used in radio and wireless communications to fill the silent time in a transmission
- Comfort object, an object used to provide psychological comfort
- Comfort women, a euphemism for women who were forced to work as sex slaves in Japanese-occupied countries during World War II
- Comfort zone, the term used to denote a type of mental conditioning resulting in artificially created mental boundaries, within which an individual derives a sense of security
- Consolation, psychological comfort
- Thermal comfort, a field of specialization in building indoor environment

== See also ==
- ComfortDelGro Australia
- Comforter (disambiguation)
