= Conforto =

Conforto may refer to:

- Giovanni Giacomo Di Conforto (1569–1630), Italian architect and engineer
- Giovanni Luca Conforti or Conforto (1560–1608), Italian composer and prominent falsetto singer
- Nicola Conforto (1718–1793), Italian composer
- Tracie Lehuanani Ruiz-Conforto (born 1963), American Olympic medalist in synchronized swimming
- Michael Conforto (born 1993), American professional baseball player

== See also ==
- Conforte
- Conforti
- Comfort
