= Moses Galante (disambiguation) =

Moses Galante may refer to:

- Moses Galante (the Elder), died 1608
- Moses Galante (the Younger), died 1689
- Moses Galante, died 1806
