= Judah Brieli =

Italian rabbi (c. 1643 – 1722)

Rabbi Judah Brieli
- יהודה בן אליעזר בריאל

Personal life
- Born: c. 1643
- Died: 1722 (aged 78–79)
- Parent: Eliezer (father)
- Occupation: rabbi

Religious life
- Religion: Judaism

Jewish leader
- Residence: Mantua

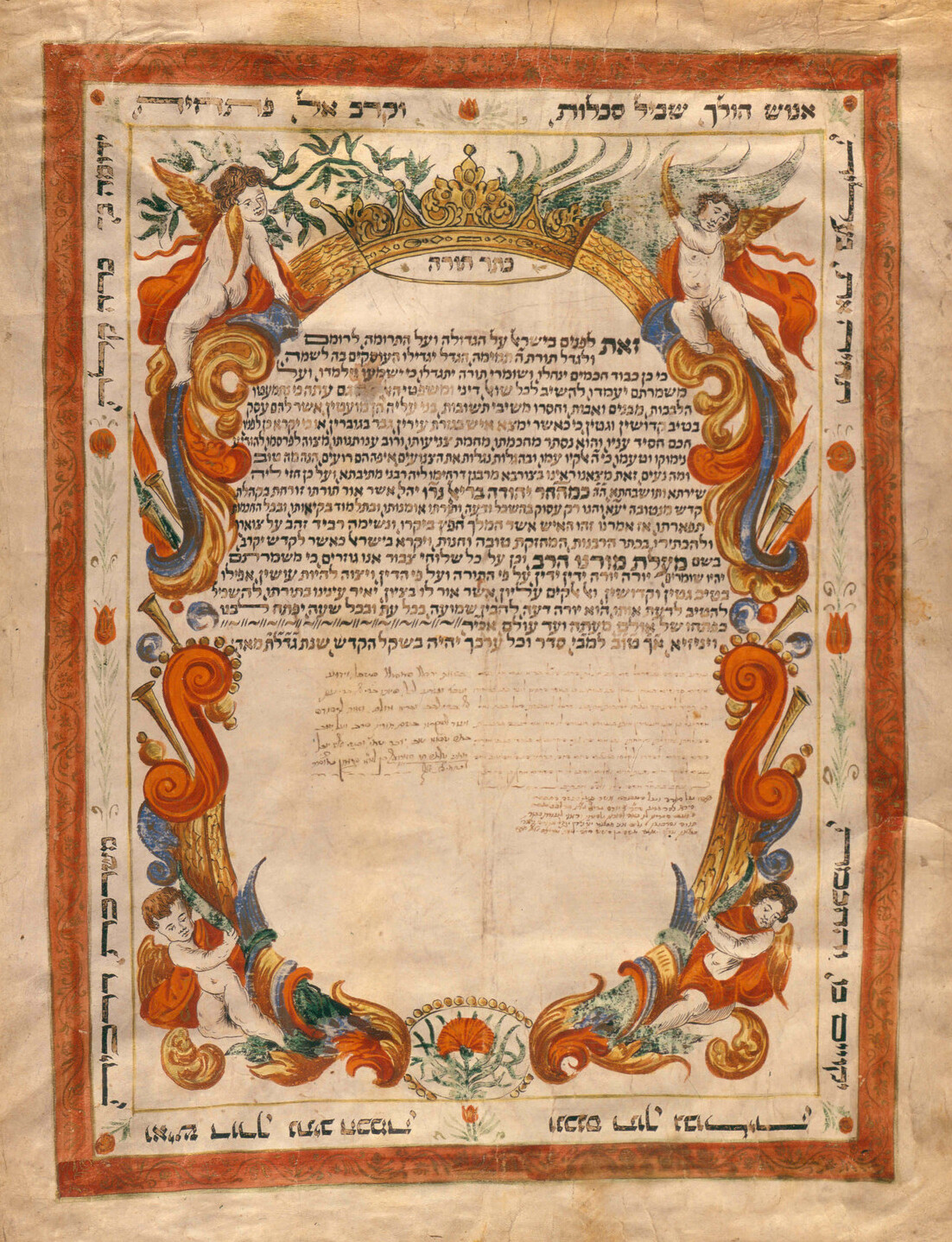
Rabbinic ordination granted to Judah ben Eliezer Briel, Venice, Italy, 1677, Library of the Jewish Theological Seminary of America

Judah Leon ben Eliezer Brieli (or Briel) (Hebrew: יהודה בן אליעזר בריאל; c. 1643 – 1722) was a rabbi at Mantua.

Besides being a high Talmudical authority, as is shown in the responsa of Ishmael Coen, Samson Morpurgo, and others who asked his opinion on halakhic questions, Brieli was well versed in the secular sciences.

An elegy on Brieli was published by his pupil, Cohen Modon, under the title Ẓir ha-Ẓirim (Hebrew: ציר הצירים), in which Brieli's knowledge of mathematics, logic, and natural history is highly praised.

== Campaign against Hayyun ==
Being highly esteemed by the Sephardic community of Amsterdam on account of his learning, his character, and his age, he was asked by Tzvi Ashkenazi and his followers for his support in their campaign against Nehemiah Hayyun and his kabbalistic vagaries. Accordingly, Brieli addressed two letters to Ashkenazi, three to Solomon Ayllon, two to the board of the Amsterdam community, and one to Benjamin Finzi, in all of which he condemned Hayyun and approved the suppression of his book.

== Works ==
Brieli was the author of the following works:

- Shefer Kelale ha-Diḳduḳ (The Beauty of the Grammatical Rules), a Hebrew grammar;
- Hassagot 'al Sifre ha-Sheluḥim (Criticisms on the Books of the Apostles);
- La Sinagoga Disingannata dagli Inganni del Padre Pinamonti;
- Esame delle Riflessioni Teologiche, on the miracles.

Of these only the first-named was published (Mantua, 1724); the others are still extant in manuscript (Giovanni Bernardo De Rossi, Nos. 22, 23; Adolf Neubauer, Catalogue of the Hebrew MSS. in the Bodleian Library s.v.).

Brieli also translated into Hebrew the letters of Seneca (Kerem Hemed, ii. 119).
