= Conforti =

Conforti is an Italian surname. Notable people with the surname include:

- Federico Conforti (born 1992), retired Italian rugby union player
- Gerardo Conforti (1903–1982), Italian equestrian.
- Gino Conforti (born 1932), American actor
- Giovanni Battista Conforti (fl. 1550–1570), Italian composer
- Giovanni Luca Conforti or Conforto (1560–1608), Italian composer and prominent falsetto singer
- Guido Maria Conforti, Italian archbishop, canonized 2011 (see Archdiocese of Ravenna)
- Mattea Conforti (born 2006), American actress
- Michael Conforti, American television writer
- Pierluigi Conforti (born 1946), Italian motorcycle road racer
- Visitación Conforti (born 1953), Argentine biologist

== See also ==
- Conforte
- Nicola Conforto (1718–1793), Italian composer
