= David Nieto =

Sephardi rabbi (1654–1728)

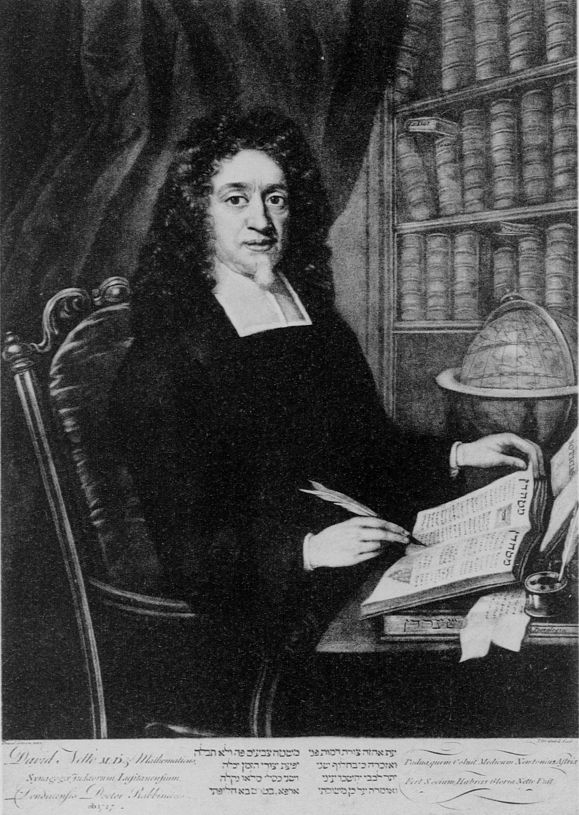
Rabbi David Nieto

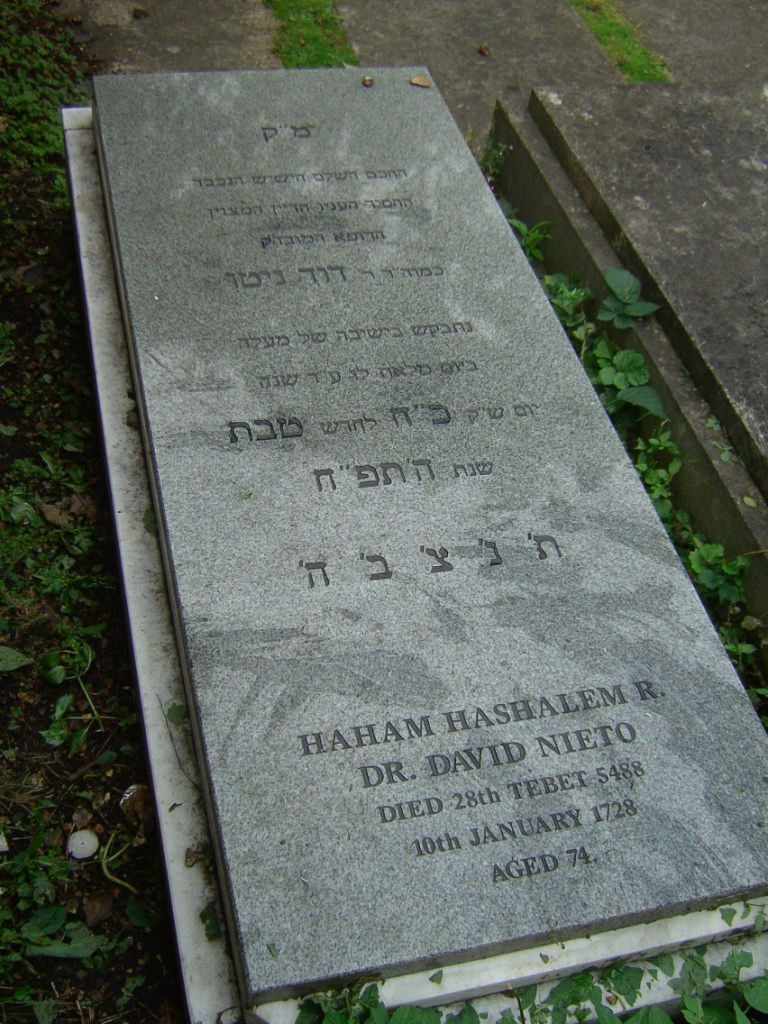
Grave of David Nieto

David Nieto (1654 – 10 January 1728) was the Hakham of the Spanish and Portuguese Jewish community in London, later succeeded in this capacity by his son, Isaac Nieto.

== Life ==
Nieto was born in Venice. He first practised as a physician and officiated as a Jewish preacher at Livorno, Italy. There he wrote in Italian a work entitled "Paschologia" (Cologne, 1702), in which he dealt with the differences of calculation in the calendars of the Greek, Roman, and Jewish churches, and demonstrated the errors which had crept into the calendar from the First Council of Nicaea until 1692.

In 1702 Nieto succeeded Solomon Ayllon as ecclesiastical chief of the Portuguese Jews in London; and two years after his settlement in that city he published his theological treatise, Della Divina Providencia, ó sea Naturalezza Universal, ó Natura Naturante (London, 1704). He explained that 'nature' was a modern word, and in reality referred to the action of God in governing natural phenomena. This work provoked opposition against him, including accusations of Spinozism (which in the atmosphere of the time meant pantheism or atheism), but some of the accusers were believed to be heretics motivated by their support for Sabbatai Zevi. Tzvi Ashkenazi, who was called in as arbitrator, decided in his favor (Hakham Tzvi, Responsa, No. 18). Not only was he exonerated, but he was highly praised for his teachings. Nieto was also highly praised by Rabbi Chaim Azulay (the 'Chida'). He died in London and is buried in the Velho Cemetery in Mile End.

Nieto was a powerful controversialist. In his Matteh Dan, or Kuzari Heleq Sheni (London, 1714), written in Hebrew and Spanish on the model of the Kuzari of Judah ha-Levi, he defended the Oral Torah against the Karaites, and showed that the disagreements in the Talmud lay not in essential laws but in minor matters. (Within the fictional framework of the book, his spokesman argues against the historic Karaite etc., even quoting from Karaite literature, but as there were few if any actual Karaites in Western Europe at the time of writing, the real attack was against Jewish dissidents such as Uriel Acosta.) He also waged war untiringly on the supporters of the Shabbethaian heresies, which he regarded as dangerous to the best interests of Judaism, and in this connection wrote his Esh Dat (London, 1715) against Hayyun (who supported Shabbetai Zevi).

He claims that the rabbis were conversant with the sciences and that the Jews were the source of the world's wisdom.

Nieto was one of the most accomplished Jews of his time and was equally distinguished as philosopher, physician, poet, mathematician, astronomer, and theologian. A prolific writer, his connection with Christian scholars was extensive, especially with Ungar, the bibliographer. Nieto was the first to fix the time for the beginning of Sabbath eve for the latitude of England.

== Bibliography ==
- Della Divina Providencia, ó sea Naturalezza Universal, ó Natura Naturante, London 1704
- Los Triunfos de la Pobreza, Panegírico, 1709
- Respuesta al Sermón Predicado por el arzobispo de Cangranor, London 1710
- Matteh Dan, or Kuzari Heleq Sheni, London 1714
- Esh Daat, London 1715
- Sermón, Oración y Problemático Dialogo, London 1716
- Noticias recónditas y póstumas del procedimiento de las Inquisiciones de España y Portugal; London 1722

== Translations ==
- Triumphs of Poverty, Guadeloupe, 2018. First English translation, by Walter Hilliger. Kindle eBook, Paperback, 2018; ISBN 978-2956185932
- On Divine Providence or Universal Nature, Guadeloupe, 2018. First English translation by Walter Hilliger; ISBN 978-2-9561859-4-9
