= Isaac Lampronti =

Italian rabbi and physician (1679–1756)

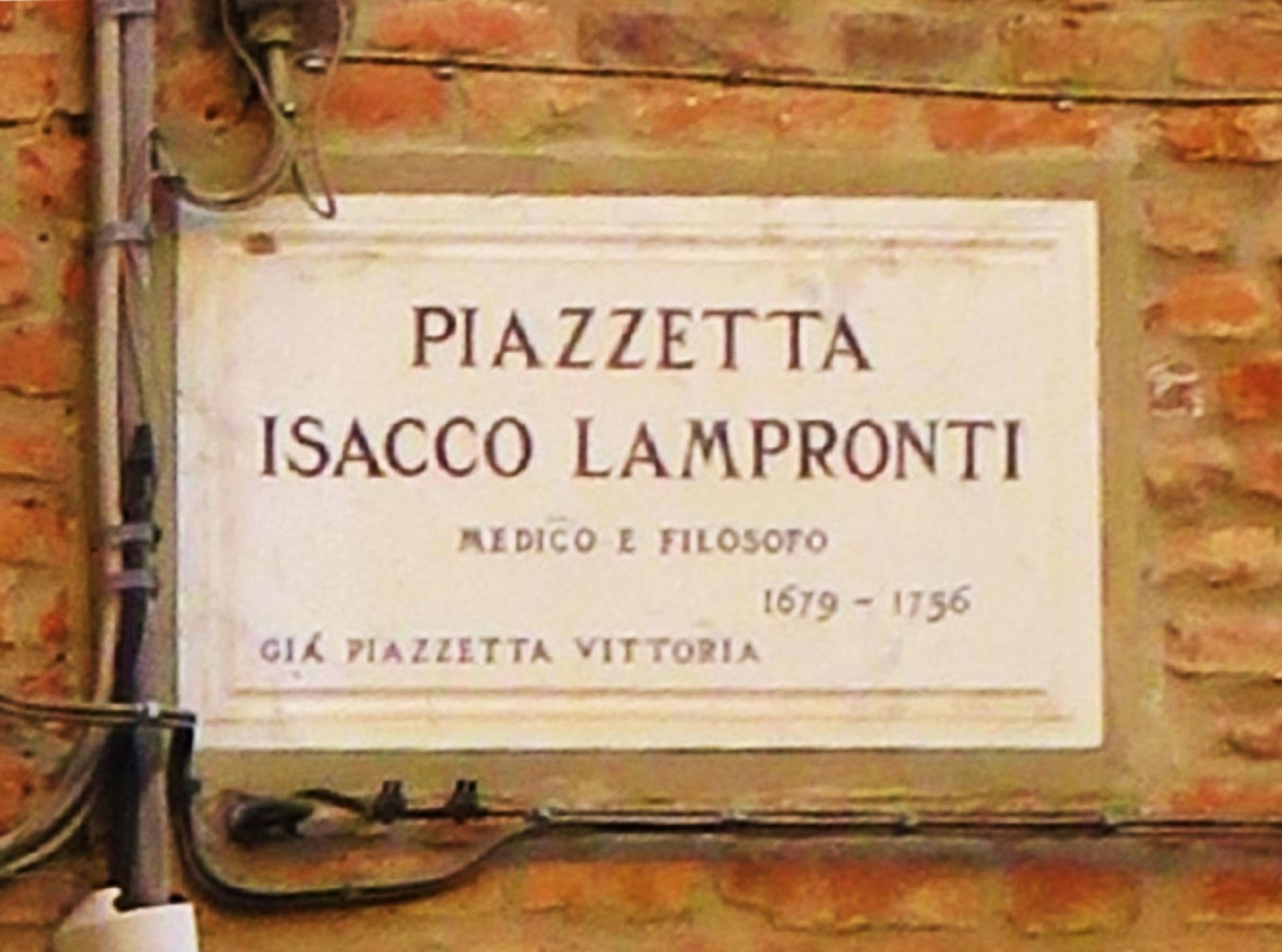
- Plaque at Piazzetta Isacco Lampronti in Ferrara

Personal life
- Born: 3 February 1679 Ferrara, Papal States
- Died: 16 November 1756 (aged 77) Ferrara, Papal States

Religious life
- Religion: Judaism
- Main work: Paḥad Yitzḥak

Isaac Lampronti (Italian: Isacco Lampronti, Hebrew: יצחק חזקיה ברבי שמואל לַמפּרוֹנטי; 3 February 1679 – 16 November 1756) was an Italian rabbi, physician, and educator, best known as author of the rabbinic encyclopedia Paḥad Yitzḥak.

== Early life and education ==
Isaac Lampronti was born in Ferrara into a family of Sephardic descent. His great-grandfather, Samuel Lampronti, had emigrated to Ferrara from Constantinople in the 16th century. Isaac's father died when he was six. He began his formal education at the age of eight under Shabbethai Elhanan Recanati and S. E. Sanguineti. At fourteen, he continued his studies in Lugo with Rabbi Manoaḥ Provençal, later moving to Padua to study medicine and philosophy. In Padua, he developed a close relationship with the physician and rabbi Isaac Cantarini.

After completing his medical studies, Lampronti spent time teaching in several Italian cities. Upon returning to Ferrara, the local yeshiva granted him the title ḥaver. He then proceeded to Mantua for advanced rabbinic study with Rabbis Judah Brial and Joseph Cases, the latter also a physician. In 1701, facing the threat of war in Mantua, Lampronti returned to Ferrara at the urging of his family. There, he established himself as a physician and educator and began offering lectures for adults in his home.

== Career ==
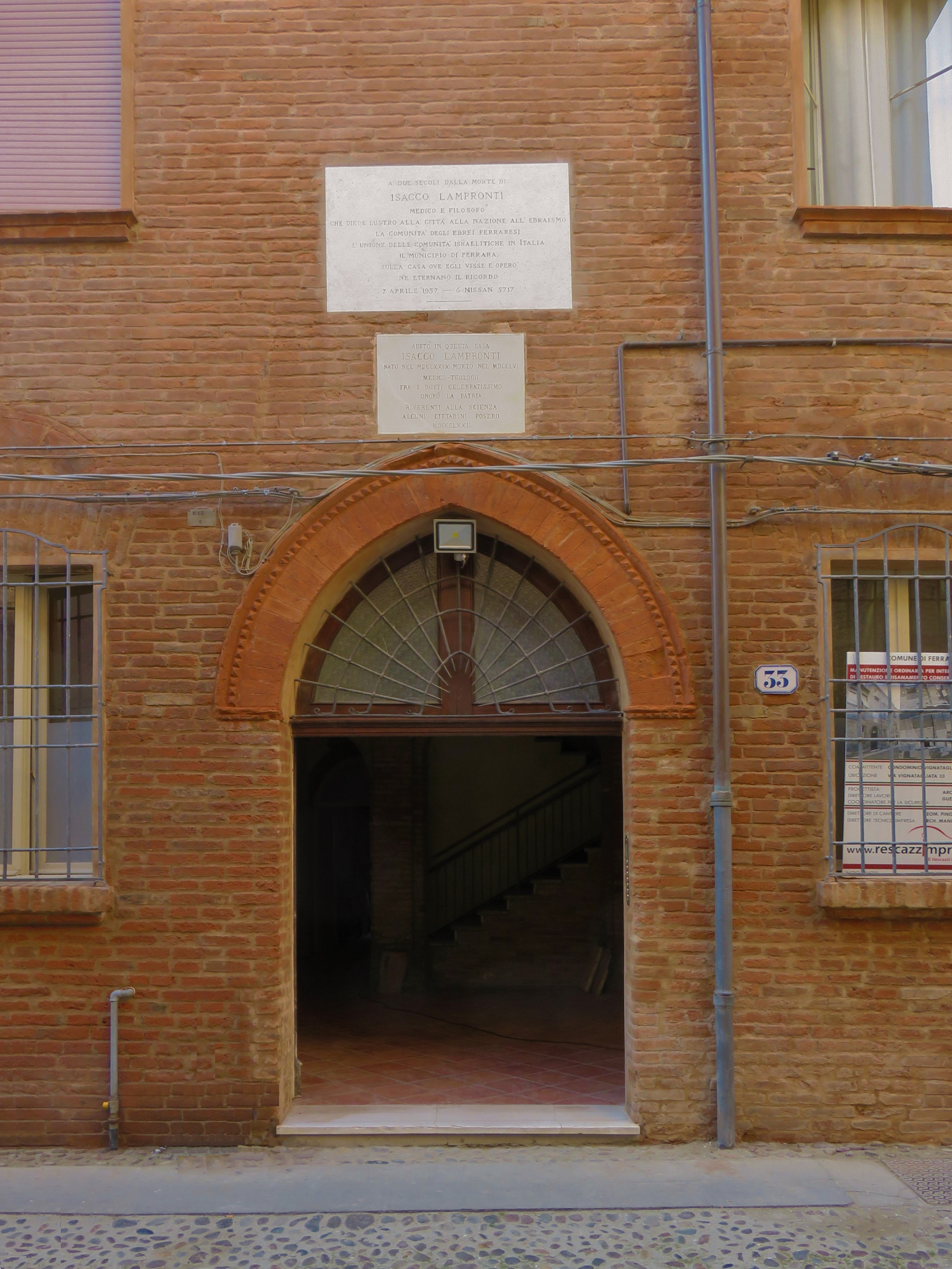
Lampronti's home at Via Vignatagliata, Ferrara.

In 1709, Lampronti was appointed teacher at the Italian Talmud Torah in Ferrara. For a salary of twelve scudi per month, he taught Hebrew grammar, Italian, and arithmetic. He also provided his students with his own weekly homilies—written in Italian—to translate into Hebrew. Some students assisted him in copying source materials for his encyclopedic project, a practice that was later forbidden by the school's administrators in 1725, who felt it distracted from his teaching responsibilities. When the Spanish Talmud Torah in Ferrara closed in 1729, Lampronti took on its students as well, effectively becoming the primary educator for much of the Jewish youth in the city.

In addition to his teaching, Lampronti served as a preacher, first for the Sephardic synagogue from 1704, and later for the Italian synagogue beginning in 1717. In 1718, Lampronti became a full member of Ferrara's rabbinical council. His name appears among the signatories of a 1727 responsum issued by the yeshiva, following the signatures of senior rabbis such as Mordecai Ẓahalon, Shabbethai Elhanan Recanati, and Samuel Baruch Borghi.

In 1738, he succeeded his former teacher Recanati as rabbi of the Sephardic synagogue. After the death of Mordecai Ẓahalon in 1749, he was appointed head of the Ferrara yeshiva and began the printing of his encyclopedia Paḥad Yitzḥak. Despite being seventy years old and suffering from mobility issues, he continued teaching actively until his death.

Notwithstanding his other occupations, Lampronti continued to practice medicine throughout his life. He was known to visit patients early in the morning, believing that the post-rest state offered the best conditions for accurate diagnosis. His contemporaries frequently added to his name the epithet "the famous physician," and he maintained scholarly correspondence with Isaac Cantarini on medical topics. He also integrated medical knowledge into many sections of his halakhic writings.

== Death and legacy ==
Lampronti died in 1756, deeply mourned by the community and his students. No stone was erected on his grave due to a papal decree issued six months earlier that prohibited Jewish tombstones in Ferrara's cemetery, which was under the jurisdiction of the Papal States.

Lampronti's memory was formally honoured more than a century after his death. On April 19, 1872, a commemorative plaque was installed on his former residence in Ferrara, funded jointly by Jewish and Christian citizens. The inscription reads:

"Abitò in questa casa Isacco Lampronti, nato nel MDCLXXIX., morto nel MDCCLVI. Medico Teologo tra i dotti celebratissimo. Onorò la patria. Riverenti alla scienza alcuni cittadini posero MDCCCLXXII." ("In this house lived Isaac Lampronti, born 1679, died 1756. A doctor and theologian renowned among scholars. He honoured his country. In reverence for science, several citizens placed this [plaque], 1872.")

== Work ==
=== Paḥad Yitzḥak ===
Isaac Lampronti's most significant scholarly achievement was Paḥad Yitzḥak, an alphabetically organized encyclopedia of Talmudic and halakhic literature. The work was originally planned as a six-volume set; however, only the first volume (1750) and part of the second (1753) were published during Lampronti's lifetime.

Lampronti began collecting material for the project during his student years in Mantua and continued working on it throughout his life. In his later years, he undertook efforts to publish the work, traveling with his student Jacob Saraval to various Italian cities to obtain rabbinic approbations. The endorsements for Volume 1, gathered in 1749 and 1750, were authored by leading rabbis and yeshivot from across northern and central Italy. Some of the approbations took the form of poetic tributes to Lampronti, including sonnets. The second volume of Paḥad Yitzḥak includes additional endorsements, notably from Rabbi Malachi ben Jacob Kohn of Livorno, author of Yad Mal’akhi, and three scholars from Palestine who were visiting Ferrara.

The remainder of Volume 2, as well as Volume 3, appeared posthumously in 1796. Volumes 4 and 5 were published in 1813 and 1840, respectively. The latter volume also featured supplementary material under the title Zekhor le-Avraham, written by Abraham Baruch Piperno. In 1845, the Bibliothèque Nationale in Paris acquired the autograph manuscript of Paḥad Yitzḥak, which comprised 120 volumes. Sixty-eight of these corresponded to content already published, while the remainder included unpublished material, as well as Lampronti's Italian-language correspondences.

Shortly after its founding, the scholarly society Mekitze Nirdamim took on the task of completing the publication of Paḥad Yitzḥak. Between 1864 and 1874, the society published the remaining volumes, thus completing the encyclopedia 127 years after the appearance of its first volume. Unlike the earlier folio-sized volumes, these later instalments were published in octavo format.

=== Sermons ===
While his sermons were widely appreciated during his lifetime, they have not been preserved. Lampronti refers to some, including a sermon on truth and falsehood, in Paḥad Yitzḥak. He also mentions his eulogy for Rabbi Samson Morpurgo, entitled Darke Shalom, in his approbation to Morpurgo's responsa Shemesh Tzedakah.
