= Hezekiah da Silva =

Jewish author (1659–1698)

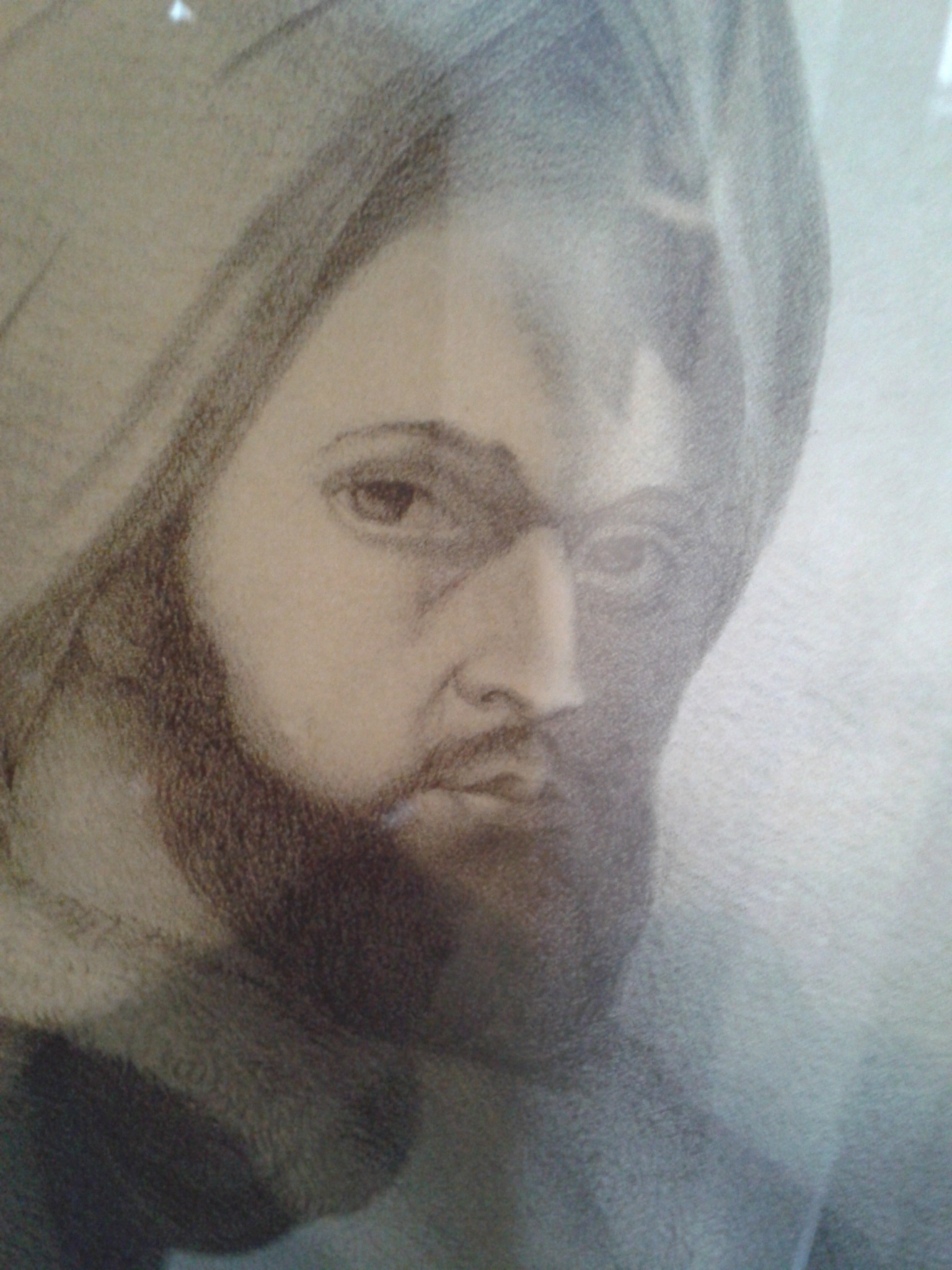
Portrait displayed in the Spanish-Portuguese synagogue, Amsterdam.

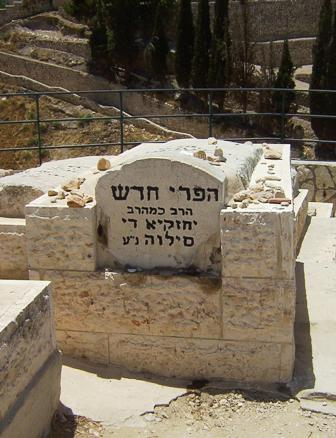
Grave on the Mount of Olives

Hezekiah da Silva (Hebrew: חזקיה בן דוד די סילוא, also Hezekiah Silva; 1659–1698) was a rabbi and Jewish author born in Livorno, Grand Duchy of Tuscany. He was the son-in-law of the dayan Mordechai Rafael Malachi.

== Biography ==
Hezekiah Da Silva was born in 1659 in Livorno, in the Grand Duchy of Tuscany. Around the year 1679, at age 20, Da Silva left his native city for Jerusalem in then-Ottoman Syria (Damascus Eyalet), where he attended the yeshivah of Rabbi Moses Galante for ten years. In 1689, Galante died and Da Silva succeeded him as Rosh Yeshiva. He was sent to Europe to collect funds for Jerusalem.

In 1691, when Da Silva was in Amsterdam, he received an offer to become the city's Sephardi rabbi, which he refused. Instead, he began the printing of his work Peri Chadash (פרי חדש), a commentary on the Yoreh De'ah. Wealthy Amsterdam Jews offered to finance the publication. Peri Chadash was published in 1691 and immediately hailed by European Torah scholars as a monumental contribution to the world of halacha. Da Silva remained in Amsterdam for a year.

On his way back to Israel he visited Egypt, where the Torah scholars were incensed that he referred in his works to earlier scholars in what they felt was in a disparaging manner. (A "brazen questioning of the authority of the Shulchan Aruch as the official codification and the final arbiter of Jewish Law.") The freedom with which Silva discussed halakhic problems brought the ban of the rabbis of Cairo upon his Pri Chadash. It was afterward removed by Rabbi Abraham Levi, although the two men - spiritually akin - were personally unacquainted.

When he arrived back in Jerusalem Hezekia opened the doors of Yeshivat Bet Yaakov. Da Silva had secured the ongoing support of the Dutch philanthropist Israel Jacob Pereira while in Amsterdam, and in Pereira's honor the yeshiva was renamed Bet Jacob Pereira. Da Silva took a decided interest in the controversy that took place between Moses Hagiz and Judah Vega. However, his death in Jerusalem in 1698 at age 39 cut short his activity in behalf of the former. He was buried at the foot of Mount of Olives.

Da Silva's wife was Chanah da Silva, the sister of the wife of Moses Hagiz. In 1683 they had a son David de Silva, who became known as the Pri Hadas.

== Works ==
Although originally controversial, many leading halachists, in time, accepted the Pri Chadash; its rulings were frequently quoted, for example by Jonathan Eybeschutz in his Krethi U'Plethi and Joseph Teomim in his Pri Megadim. Today, Pri Chadash is printed in the standard edition of Shulchan Aruch (see Shulchan Aruch § Major commentaries) and is widely studied by rabbinic scholars. Pri Toar, a work on Shulchan Aruch by Or ha-Ḥayyim, especially discusses Silva's rulings.

Silva was likewise the author of the Mayim Ḥayyim, ("living waters") containing a collection of notes on Talmudic treatises and the Yad of Maimonides; he also authored several responsa, .

Pri Chadash was supplemented by a second and a third part edited by his son David Da Silva. The work bore the approbation of the chief authorities of the time (Amsterdam, 1706–1730). (David Da Silva expressly states that he was a teacher at Jerusalem, not a rabbi, but despite this Luncz claims that he was chief rabbi of Jerusalem and that he died in 1740.)

== Jewish Encyclopedia bibliography ==
- Azulai, Chaim Joseph, Shem ha-Gedolim
- Grätz, Heinrich, Geschichte der Juden, x. 320
- Luncz, Abraham Moses, Yerushalayim,, i.120
- Fürst, Julius, Bibliotheca Judaica, iii. 323-324
- Steinschneider, Moritz, Catalogus Librorum Hebræorum in Bibliotheca Bodleiana, col. 845
