= Saul Lowenstam =

Dutch rabbi and talmudist

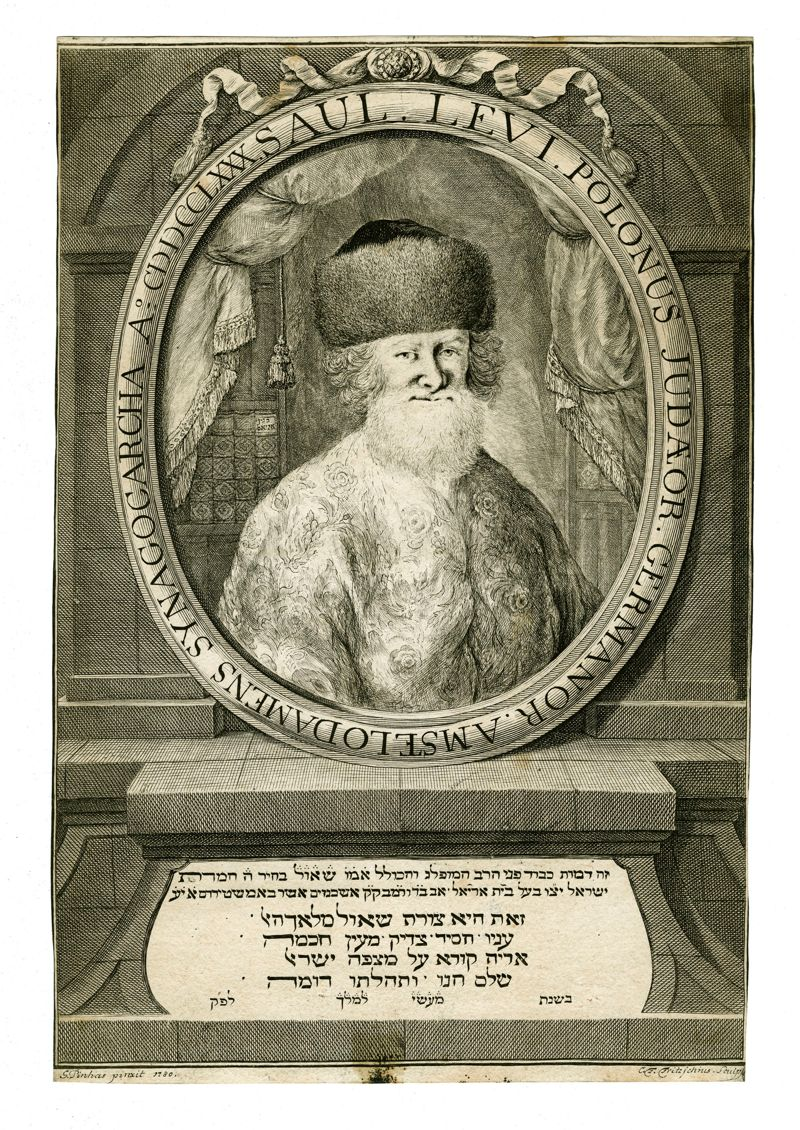
- Title: Chief Rabbi of Amsterdam

Personal life
- Born: 1717 Rzeszów, Poland
- Died: 19 June 1790 (aged 72–73) Amsterdam, Netherlands
- Spouse: Hendele Kahana
- Children: Jacob Moses Lowenstam

Religious life
- Religion: Judaism
- Denomination: Orthodox

Jewish leader
- Predecessor: Aryeh Leib ben Saul
- Successor: Jacob Moses Lowenstam
- Main work: Talmudic scholarship

Saul Lowenstam (1717 – 19 June 1790) was a renowned Dutch rabbi and talmudist.He was Chief Rabbi of Amsterdam from 1755-1790.

Saul Lowenstam was born in 1717 in Rzeszów to his parents Aryeh Leib ben Saul (who was the rabbi in Rzeszów at the time) and Miriam the daughter of the Chacham Tzvi. He married Hendele, the daughter of Abraham Kahana, who was rabbi of Grodno, Ukraine. His first rabbinical position was in Lokachi, Ukraine (located in the Lokachi Raion and named Lakacz in Yiddish), followed by Dubno, where he succeeded his father-in-law.

After the death of his father in 1755, Lowenstam succeeded him as the Chief Rabbi of Amsterdam, Netherlands. Lowenstam died in Amsterdam on 19 June 1790. He was succeeded as Chief Rabbi by his son, Jacob Moses Lowenstam.

== Works ==
Lowenstam was the author of the Binyan Ariel published in Amsterdam 1778. He also authored a Torah Commentary HeChatzer HaChadasha published in Amsterdam in 1768. A pamphlet titled Halacha Lema'aseh Rav published in Amsterdam in 1828 contains his 1783 halachic ruling asserting the kashrut of Dutch cheese.
