= Buberl =

Buberl is a surname. Notable people with the surname include:

- Caspar Buberl (1834–1899), American sculptor
- Thomas Buberl (born 1973), German businessman

== See also ==
- Buber
