= Naphtali Cohen =

Russian Orthodox rabbi (1649–1718)

Rabbi Naftali Katz II
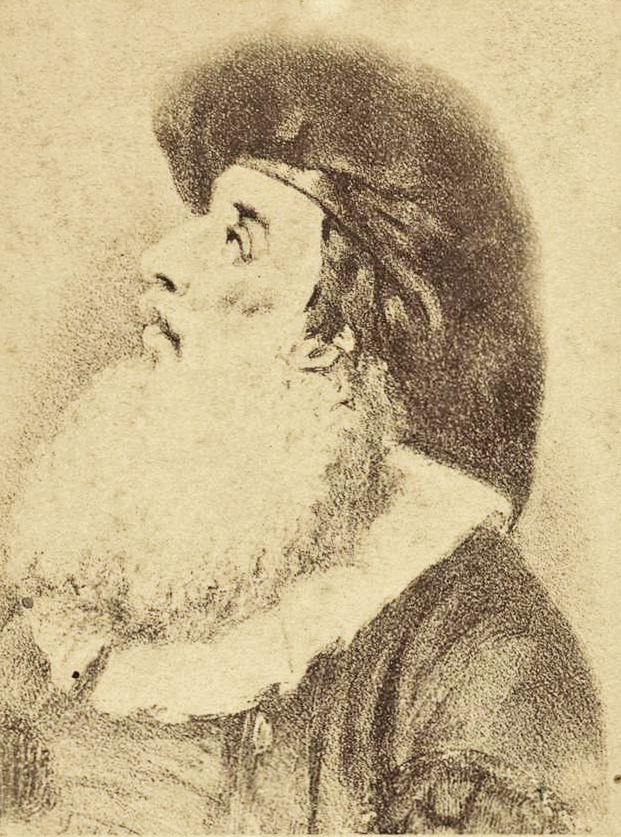

Personal life
- Born: 1650 Ostroh, Polish–Lithuanian Commonwealth
- Died: 20 December 1719 (aged 68–69) Constantinople, Ottoman Empire
- Spouse: Esther Sheindel Sheyndl Zak
- Children: 13
- Parent(s): Yitzchak HaCohen Katz; Edel Eidel Margolioth

Religious life
- Religion: Judaism

Naphtali Cohen (1649–1718), also known as Naphtali HaKohen Katz, was a rabbi and kabalist born in Ostroh, in what was then the Polish–Lithuanian Commonwealth. He belonged to a family of rabbis in Ostroh, where his father, Isaac HaCohen, a great-grandson of Maharal of Prague, had fled during the Polish–Cossack–Tatar War.

== Biography ==
In 1663 Cohen fell into the hands of the Tatars, who kept him in servitude for several years. Escaping, he returned to Ostroh, and was chosen to succeed his father as rabbi. In 1690 he was called to Posen, where he officiated as chief rabbi until 1704. There he devoted himself to the Kabbalah, and collected a large library of cabalistic literature.

In 1704 he was called to Frankfurt am Main. On the occasion of a fire which, breaking out in his house on January 14, 1711, spread to and consumed the entire Jewish quarter, it was charged that, relying on the efficacy of his cabalistic charms, he had prevented the extinction of the fire by the ordinary means. He was arrested and thrown into prison, and regained his liberty only upon renouncing his office.

He then went to Prague, where many members of his family lived. There another misfortune, which embittered his life more than the loss of his wealth and position, befell him. The Shabbethaian cabalist Nehemiah Hayyun appeared in Prague, declaring himself a preacher or an emissary from Palestine, and by his duplicity gained the confidence of the credulous Cohen. Being a believer in practical Cabala, Cohen found no fault with Ḥayyun, even when the latter began to sell amulets. It is not astonishing, therefore, that when Ḥayyun asked for an approbation for his mystical work Mehemnuta de Kula, Cohen, to whom he had prudently submitted only the main text, but not the commentaries which accompanied it, and in which the author openly professed the doctrine of the Trinity, readily granted it, and gave him a glowing recommendation. Provided with this and with other recommendations secured in the same way, Ḥayyun traveled throughout Moravia and Silesia, propagating everywhere his Shabbethaian teachings.

Cohen soon discovered his mistake, and endeavored, but without success, to recover his approbation, although he did not as yet realize the full import of the book. It was in 1713, while Cohen was staying at Breslau (where he acted as a rabbi until 1716), that Ḥakam Ẓebi Ashkenazi of Amsterdam informed him of its tenets. Cohen thereupon acted rigorously. He launched a ban against the author and his book, and became one of the most zealous supporters of Ḥakam Ẓebi in his campaign against Ḥayyun.

In 1715 Cohen went to see August II, King of Poland, to secure reinstatement in his former rabbinate of Posen, at that time vacant; but failed because of the opposition of the leaders of the community. He then returned to Ukraine, and in 1718 started for the Holy Land, but died on the way at Constantinople on Dec. 20, 1718.

== Works ==
- Birkat Adonai (Blessing of the Lord), a commentary on Berakot, with an introduction on the correlation of the Mishnaic tractates, having the subtitle Semikut Ḥakamim (Connection of the Wise), Frankfort-on-the-Main, 1702 (Cohen was so proud of this work that he ordered it to be buried with him).
- Meshek ha-Zera (Sowing of the Seed), commentary on the Mishnaic order Zeraim (not published).
- Pi Yesharim (Mouth of the Righteous), a kabalistic introduction to Genesis, Frankfort-on-the-Main, 1702.
- Sefer Bet Raḥel (Book of the House of Rachel), quoted in his will, probably identical with Tefillat Bet Raḥel (Prayer of the House of Rachel), published at Amsterdam in 1741.

Cohen also edited a number of prayer-books, including Seliḥot (Penitential Prayers), with a commentary, Frankfort-on-the-Main, 1702; prayers for the Society for Burial, ib., n.d.; a prayer for the staying of the plague, Prague, 1713; and an ode on a Sefer Torah donated by Baruch Austerlitz. He also wrote an epistle directed against Nehemiah Ḥayyun. Cohen's ethical will, Ẓawwa'ah, is replete with lofty moral instructions (Berlin, 1729).

== See also ==
- Yisroel Meir Gabbai
