= Aryeh Leib ben Saul =

Polish rabbi

Aryeh Leib ben Saul Löwenstam (c. 1690 – 2 April 1755) was a Polish rabbi.

== Life ==
Aryeh Leib was born in c. 1690 in Kraków. He came of a famous family of rabbis. His father Saul had been a rabbi of Kraków from 1700 to 1704; his grandfather was Rabbi Hoeschl of Kraków. In 1707 in Berlin, he married Miriam, the oldest daughter of Tzvi Ashkenazi, then rabbi in Altona, and continued his studies under his father-in-law, with whom he went to Amsterdam and Poland.

His first known rabbinical position was in Dubno. He was elected rabbi of Dukla in 1717. Through the influence of his relatives he then obtained the rabbinical position in Tarnopol in 1718 or 1720, the former incumbent having been ousted by the officials of the government to open a space for him. This interference on the part of the civic authorities naturally aroused great opposition to him in the congregation, and Aryeh Leib was deposed in 1724. Subsequently he was elected rabbi of Rzeszów from 1724 to 1728. In 1728 he was appointed rabbi of Głogów and Lviv, a position held until 1740. In 1740 he was appointed rabbi of Amsterdam (a position that was offered to his father Saul years earlier,) a position he held until his death in 1755. A call was extended to him from Prague in 1751 but he did not accept it. While The Jewish Encyclopedia doubts whether he was rabbi in Lviv, as stated by Buber (Anshe Shem, p. 38), Dembitzer, in the Klilat Yofi, and Reuven Margaliot provide evidence for his position in Lviv/Lemberg, with Dembitzer stating that he held both positions simultaneously, while Margaliot writes that he changed positions a number of times in those years between the rabbinates of Glogau and Lviv.

== Works ==
Aryeh did not publish any books, and what there is of his exists in the works of others—as in the responsa of Tzvi Ashkenazi, No. 76; in those of Mordecai of Düsseldorf (Maamar Mordecai, Nos. 62, 63, Brünn, 1790), and in the works of his son Saul, Binyan Ariel (Amsterdam, 1778)—and shows no originality. He took an active part in the controversy between Jacob Emden and Jonathan Eybeschütz, and sided with the former, who was his wife's brother. His letters on that controversy are full of invectives against Eybeschütz (see Emden's Sefat Emet, p. 16, Lemberg, 1877). According to the testimony of his brother-in-law, Jacob Emden (see the latter's autobiography, Megillat Sefer, pp. 21, 68, Warsaw, 1896), he was a man of mediocre abilities, whose scientific attainments were not above the practical requirements for the rabbinical office.

His first approbation as Chief Rabbi of Amsterdam dates from June 1741, on the book Kehilat Shelomo al sefer Ein Yakov, written by Shelomo Yekutiel Zalman ben Yechiel Ichel Glogau, published in Amsterdam. Aryeh signs as residing from Glogau, supervising the congregation in Lviv and ready to serve in Amsterdam, where he was appointed but apparently did not yet live.

== Descendants ==
Of his sons, one, Saul (1717 – 20 June 1790), was his successor, while the other, who called himself Hart Lyon, was Chief Rabbi in London and Berlin. The son of the latter was Chief Rabbi Solomon Herschell, first Chief Rabbi of the British Empire. His daughter Sarah Leah was the wife of Yitzhak HaLevi, the rabbi of Kraków from 1776 until his death in 1799. Yitzhak HaLevi's son Tzvi Hirsch David Ha-Levi was Acting Rabbi of Kraków from 1799 and formally appointed Rabbi of Kraków in 1816 until his death in 1831.

Aryeh was the grandfather of Rabbi Hirsch Dawid Levi.

== Jewish Encyclopedia bibliography ==
- S. Buber, Anshe Shem, pp. 37 ff., Kraków, 1895
