= Moses Hagiz =

Talmudic scholar, rabbi, and writer (1671 – c. 1750)

- משה חגיז

Personal life
- Born: 1671 Jerusalem, Ottoman Empire
- Died: c. 1750 Safed, Ottoman Empire
- Spouse: Daughter of Raphael Mordecai Malachi
- Parent: Jacob Hagiz
- Notable works: Lekeṭ ha-Kemah; Sefat Emet; Eleh haMitsvot; Sheber Posh'im; Perurei Pat haKemaḥ; Zeror ha-Hayyim; Mishnaṭ Hakhamim; Shetei ha-Leḥem; Parashat Eleh Mas'ei
- Known for: Restoring rabbinic authority, anti-Sabbatean campaigns
- Occupation: Talmudic scholar, rabbi, writer
- Relatives: Moses Galante (grandfather), Hezekiah da Silva (brother-in-law)

Religious life
- Religion: Judaism

Moses Hagiz (1671 – c. 1750) (Hebrew: משה חגיז) was a Talmudic scholar, rabbi and writer born in Jerusalem during the time of the Old Yishuv. He was also one of the most prominent and influential Jewish leaders in 17th-century Amsterdam. During Hagiz's lifetime, there was an overall decline in rabbinic authority which was the result of migration and assimilation, and Hagiz devoted his career to restoring rabbinic authority. His most prominent talent was as a polemicist, and he campaigned ceaselessly against Jewish heresy in an attempt to unify the rabbinate.

== Biography ==
Moses' father, Jacob Hagiz, died while Moses was still a child. The latter was therefore educated by his maternal grandfather, Moses Galante (the Younger), who had succeeded his son-in-law. With the death of Moses Galante (1689) support from Livorno was withdrawn, and Hagiz found himself in very straitened circumstances. He went to Safed to collect a claim which his mother had against the congregation, but succeeded only in making bitter enemies who later persecuted him.

Returning to Jerusalem, he was given letters of recommendation nominating him as a rabbinical emissary or shadar sent to obtain support for a bet ha-midrash (study hall) which he intended to establish. At Rashid (Rosetta), Abraham Nathan gave him 30,000 thalers to deposit at Livorno for this purpose. Arriving at Livorno, he secured from Vega, the protector of his family, a promise of further support; but his Palestinian enemies slandered him and ruined his prospects. He subsequently wandered through Italy, and while in Venice (1704), he edited the Halakot Ketannot of his father. Somewhat later he went to Amsterdam, where he supported himself by teaching, and occupied himself with the publication of his works. In Amsterdam he made the acquaintance of Tzvi Ashkenazi, then rabbi of the Ashkenazic congregation, and assisted him in unmasking the impostor Nehemiah Hayyun. This step, however, made more enemies for him, and, like Tzvi Ashkenazi, he had to leave the city (1714).

Until 1738 he resided at Altona; he then returned to Palestine, settling first at Sidon, and later at Safed, where he died sometime after 1750. He married a daughter of Raphael Mordecai Malachi, and was therefore a brother-in-law of Hezekiah da Silva. He had no children.

== Anti-Sabbateanism ==
From an early age, Hagiz was exposed to both Sabbatean and anti-Sabbatean leaders. Moses's father Jacob was the leading rabbi in Jerusalem in 1666 and issued a ban against Sabbatai Zevi. His teacher Abraham Yitzchaki was a fierce anti-Sabbatean after the apostasy. Moses's maternal grandfather was probably a Sabbatean prophet, and under his leadership in Jerusalem the Sabbatean community grew. Moses' father-in-law Raphael Mordecai Malachi was a crypto-Sabbatean leader in Jerusalem and this perhaps led to his falling out with Hagiz. For much of Moses's travels after leaving Jerusalem, Malachi caused immense problems.

When Hagiz came to Amsterdam he immediately became embroiled in disputes with the Sephardic lay leadership, criticizing their lax religious observance and their anti-Rabbinic attitudes. When Nehemiah Hayyun arrived in Amsterdam and the Sephardic community agreed to publish his books, Hagiz, with the help of Hakham Tzvi Ashkenazi, began a crusade against his apparent Sabbateanism. The Sephardic leadership, and the community's rabbi Solomon Ayllon, supported Hayyun against Hagiz leading Hagiz to issue bans (herem) against those who associated with Hayyun and the lay leadership to issue bans against those who associated with Hagiz. This Rabbinate-lay leadership battle soon involved rabbis from across Europe as Hagiz rallied the Rabbis against Hayyun, perhaps as part of his life goal of reestablishing Rabbinic supremacy in Jewish affairs. After Hayyun was banished from Amsterdam, Hagiz would encounter him again during later fights against Sabbateanism in the 1720s and 1730s. Hayyun and Hagiz both wrote many books attacking each other on both personal and theosophical bases.

Hagiz was instrumental in the Eastern European anti-Sabbatean campaigns of the 1720s and 1730s, writing letters and books against Sabbatean thinking, and rallying the support of communities throughout the Jewish world. Later, Hagiz would also be a major figure in the controversies concerning Moses Chaim Luzzatto.

== Works ==
Moses Hagiz was not only a great Talmudic scholar, but also a man of wider secular learning than most of the rabbis of his time. According to Wolf, who knew him personally, he understood several languages and was somewhat familiar with modern history (see his Mishnat Hakamim, Nos. 627 and 682); he advocated the study of secular sciences (ib. No. 114), and admitted that the Zohar has been interpolated by later scribes (ib. No. 108). In regard to his character reports differ; some represent him as filled with sincere religious zeal, others as a contentious wrangler. Rabbi Yeshayahu Basan the mentor and staunchest defender of Luzzato describes Hagiz in one letter as a person who loves to quarrel and eager to criticize people's works, and that in one instance he criticized an author in regards to a claim that turned out to be an old Jewish tradition predating the author many hundreds of years. Jacob Emden describes him as a time-server, and even as religiously insincere, though he respected him as a friend of his father.

Hagiz wrote:

- Lekeṭ ha-Kemah, novellae to the Shulhan Arukh (OraH Hayyim and Yoreh De'ah, Amsterdam, 1697 and 1707; Eben ha-'Ezer, Hamburg, 1711 and 1715)
- Sefat Emet, on the religious significance of Palestine for Jews (Amsterdam, 1697 and 1707)
- Eleh haMitsvot, on the 613 commandments (Amsterdam, 1713 and Wandsbeck, 1727)
- Sheber Posh'im, polemics against Hayyun (London, 1714)
- Lekeṭ ha-Kemaḥ, commentary on the Mishnah (Wandsbeck, 1726)
- Perurei Pat haKemaḥ, commentary to Book of Daniel (Amsterdam, 1727)
- Zeror ha-Hayyim, ethics (Wandsbeck, 1728)
- Mishnaṭ Hakhamim, ethics (ib. 1733)
- Shetei ha-Leḥem, responsa (ib. 1733)
- Parashat Eleh Mas'ei, on the land of Yisrael (ib. 1733)

Other works of his remained unpublished. He also wrote numerous prefaces to the books of others. His writings are signed "המני"ח", the letters of "Moses ibn Jacob Hagiz." (Among Sephardic Jews the Nun (letter) was used in its ending form to represent the Arabic word "ibn", meaning son of).
