= Isaac Halevy =

Isaac Halevy may refer to:

- Yitzhak HaLevi Herzog (1888–1959), first Chief Rabbi of Ireland
- Yitzhak Isaac Halevy Rabinowitz (1847–1914), rabbi, Jewish historian, and founder of the Agudath Israel organization
- Yitzhak HaLevi ben Mordechai Raitzes (c. 1730–1799), Rabbi of Kraków from 1778 to 1799
- Beit Yitzhak HaLevi, a family of Yemenite Jewish scholars, including Yihya Yitzhak Halevi (1867–1932)
