= Joseph Fiametta =

Italian rabbi (??–1721)

Joseph ben Solomon Fiametta (died 1721) was an Italian rabbi at Ancona.

He was the father-in-law of Samson Morpurgo, rabbi of Ancona. He wrote: "Widdui," atonement prayers of the Italian rite, included in the "Tik ḳun Shobabim" of Moses Zacuto, Venice, 1712; "Or Boḳer," containing prayers and seliḥot, Venice, 1709. He wrote also an approbation to Nehemiah Ḥayun's "'Oz le-Elohim," Berlin, 1713, and a panegyric poem on Abraham Cohen's "Kehunnat Abraham," Venice, 1719.

Among the Italian responsa there is one regarding communal taxation signed by Shabbethai Panzieri and Joseph Fiametta.
