= Yitzhak HaLevi ben Mordechai Raitzes =

Personal life
- Born: c. 1730 Lwów, Polish–Lithuanian Commonwealth
- Died: 14 June 1799 Kraków, West Galicia, Austria

Religious life
- Religion: Judaism

Yitzhak HaLevi ben Mordechai Raitzes (c. 1730 – 14 June 1799) was a Polish rabbi.

== Biographical information ==
Yitzhak HaLevi was born circa 1730 in Lviv to Mordechai Halevi Raitzes the Rosh Mesivta in Lviv, who was the son of Yehoshua (Joshua) Raitzes (Reizes) who was martyred in Lviv on 13 May 1728. He married Sara Leah Lowenstamm, the daughter of Aryeh Leib ben Saul, the Rabbi of Amsterdam, and the granddaughter of Tzvi Ashkenazi, the Chacham Tzvi. Halevi's first rabbinical position was Av Bais Din of Leshnev a small town, currently in Lviv Oblast in Ukraine. From 1769 to 1778 he was the Av Bais Din of Chełm. In 1778 (or 1776) he became the Rabbi of Kraków, a position that he held until his death on 14 June 1799.

== Descendants ==
One of his sons Mordechai Halevi was the Rabbi of Tykocin, while his other son Tzvi Hersch David Levin held the post as the Rabbi of Szczebrzeszyn before moving to Kraków to help his father in the rabbinate of Kraków. From 1799 to 1816 he held the post of acting Rabbi of Kraków, and became the Rabbi of Kraków in 1816 (the Rabbi appointed in 1800 stayed in his position for a week before leaving for Warsaw, thus leaving Kraków without an official Rabbi until 1816,) a position held until his death on 18 December 1831.
