= Moshe ben Yonatan Galante =

17th-century rabbi and first Rishon LeZion

- משה גאלנטי
- Title: Rishon Le'Zion

Personal life
- Born: 1621
- Died: February 4, 1689 (aged 67–68) Jerusalem, Ottoman Empire
- Parent: Yonatan Galante
- Notable works: Zebaḥ ha-Shelamim; Ḳorban Ḥagigah
- Known for: First Rishon Le'Zion
- Other name: Magen (מגן)
- Occupation: Rabbi
- Relatives: Moshe Galante (grandfather)

Religious life
- Religion: Judaism

Senior posting
- Disciples: Hezekiah da Silva

Moshe ben Yonatan Galante (Hebrew: משה גאלנטי; 1621 – 4 February 1689 Jerusalem), grandson of Moshe Galante, was a 17th-century rabbi at Jerusalem. He served as the first Rishon Le'Zion and was called Magen (מגן) with reference to the initials of his name. Hezekiah da Silva was among his disciples.

He wrote Zebach ha-Shelamim, a harmonisation of contradictory Biblical passages and of Biblical with Talmudical statements (edited by his grandson Moses Hagis, Amsterdam, 1707–08), and Khorban Chagigah, halakic and kabalistic novellæ (Venice, 1714). Some of his responsa are found in the works of contemporaries, and a volume of his responsa exists under the title Elef ha-Magen, but has never been published (as of 1906).

== See also ==
- Galante (pedigree)

== Jewish Encyclopedia bibliography ==
- Steinschneider, Cat. Bodl. s.v.;
- Azulai, Shem ha-Gedolim
