= Abraham Cohen of Zante =

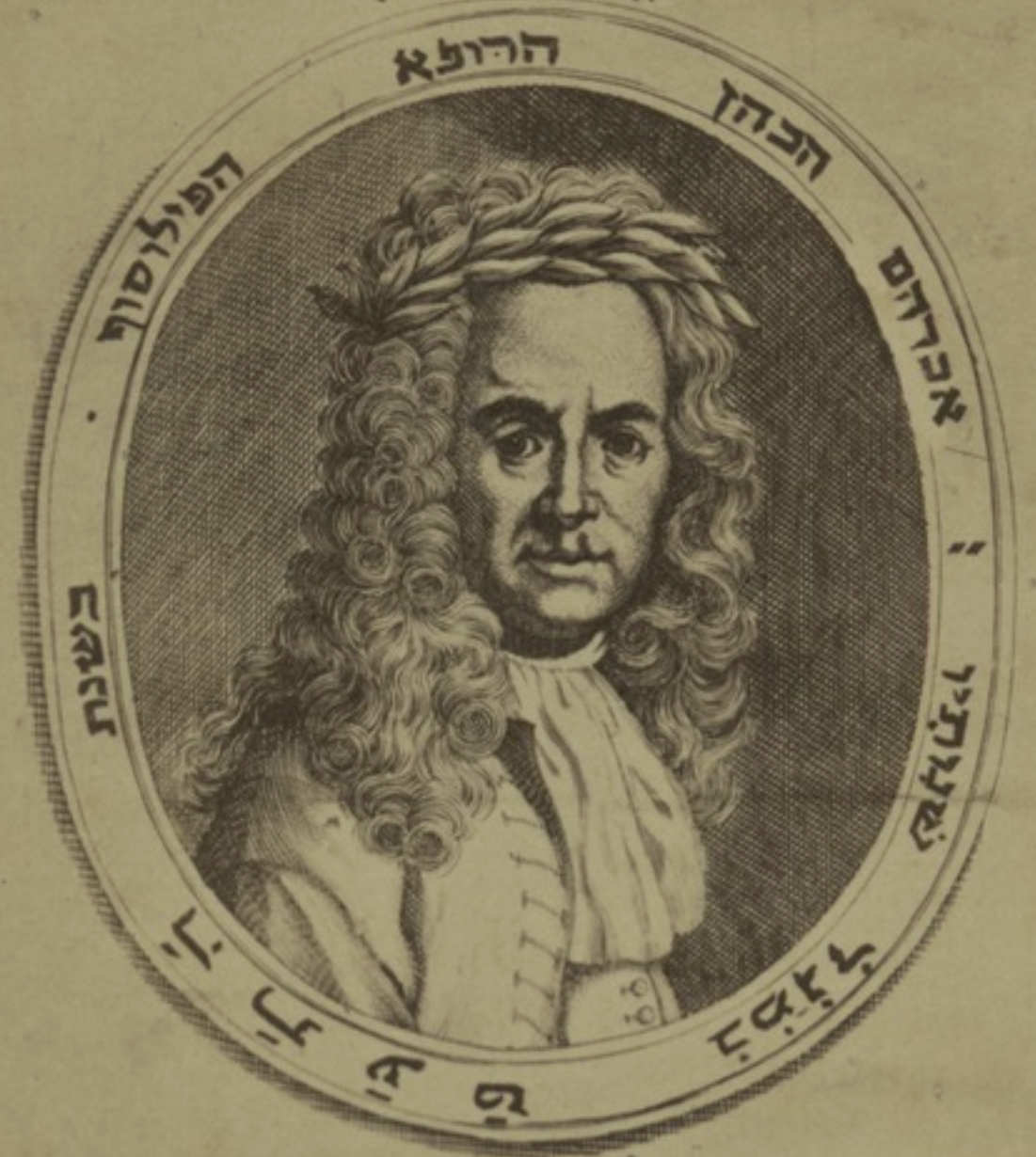
- Abraham Cohen at age 49 in 1719
- Born: 1670; Ottoman Crete
- Died: 1729 (aged 58–59)
- Occupations: Physician, rabbi, philosopher, and poet

Abraham Cohen (Abraham ben Shabbetai ha-Kohen) (1670 – 1729) was a Jewish physician, rabbi, religious philosopher and poet on Zante (Zakynthos), an Ionian Island, and an overseas colony of the Venetian Republic.

Cohen's family was moderately wealthy and lived on Crete where he was born, although he lived most of his adult life in the town of Zante where he practiced medicine. He was a scholar and graduated as a physician from the University of Padua.

== Work ==
In 1700 Cohen published in Venice his Derashot 'al ha-Torah, a common title for homilies (sermons) and commentary on the Pentateuch (Torah). His Derashot 'al ha-Torah is also known as Kebod Chacamim or Kevod Ḥakhamim (The Glory of Wise Men). In 1719 he published in Venice his Kehunnat Abraham (כהנת אברהם), a book of religious poems in Hebrew written in the manner of and inspired by the Psalms (Tehillim). Cohen used a number of different meters in his poetry. His Kehunnat Abraham created a stir within the Jewish community of the Venetian Republic and other parts of Italy, full of compliments. Joseph Fiametta published a poem in praise of it, as did Issac Vita Cantarini and Shabbethai Marini, both in the mode of the times, sonnet form. Cohen's engraved self-portrait appears on the fly-leaf of his Kehunnat Abraham complete with wig.

In 1879 M. Ventura of Corfu found a Hebrew poem by Cohen inscribed on the wall of the synagogue in Candia, Crete, and later published his discovery.
