= Conforte =

Conforte is a surname. Notable people with the surname include:

- David Conforte (c. 1618 – c. 1685), Greek-born Hebrew literary historian and writer
- Joe Conforte (1925–2019), American brothel owner

== See also ==
- Comfort (disambiguation)
- Confort
- Conforti, a related Italian surname
- Conforto
