= Comforter (disambiguation) =

A comforter is a type of blanket. It may also refer to:

- "Comforter" (song), a 1993 song by Shai
- Pacifier, also known as a comforter, an artificial teat
- Paraclete, a title of the Holy Spirit that is sometimes translated as "comforter"
- Cap comforter, a military headdress
- A long scarf

== See also ==
- Comfort (disambiguation)
