= Shabbethai Panzieri =

Shabbethai ben Mordecai Panzieri was an Italian rabbi of the seventeenth century.

He was Rabbi of Rome in 1652 and 1653, of Sinigaglia from 1680 to 1685, and again of Rome from the last-mentioned year. He had a reputation as a Talmudist, and corresponded with Samuel Aboab in Venice and with Jehiel Finzi in Florence.

When it was desired to introduce into the community the system of selfvaluation of property supported by an oath, Shabbethai spoke very energetically in favor of the method hitherto pursued, namely, that of valuation by a commission of seven members. He was supported by Joseph Fiammetta.
