= Samson Morpurgo =

Italian rabbi, physician and liturgist

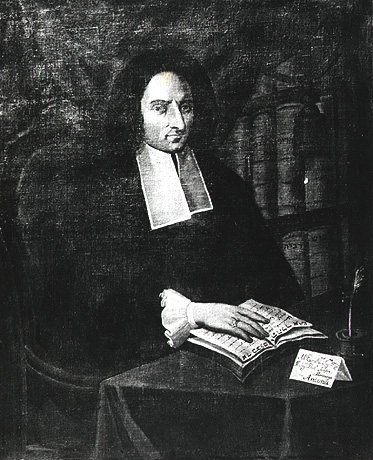

Personal life
- Born: 1681 Gradisca, Republic of Venice
- Died: 12 April 1740 (aged 58–59) Ancona, Papal States

Religious life
- Religion: Judaism

Samson ben Joshua Moses Morpurgo (Hebrew: שמשון בן יהושע משה מוֹרְפּוּרְגוֹ; 1681 – 12 April 1740) was an Italian rabbi, physician, and liturgist.

== Early life and education ==
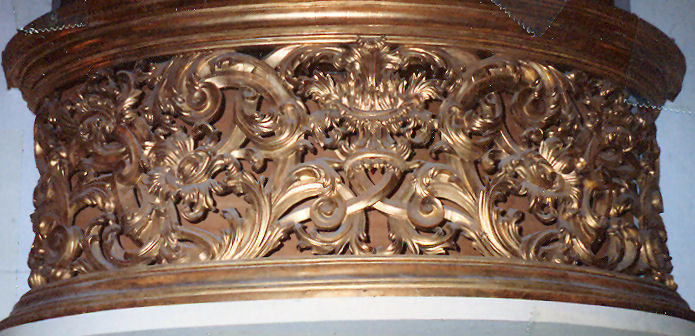
Details from the Ark of the main synagogue in Ancona, Italy.

Samson Morpurgo was born in 1681 in Gradisca. As a child, he moved with his family to nearby Gorizia, where he studied under Rabbi Jacob Hai Gentili and his son, Manasseh. Around the age of 12 or 13, he relocated to Venice to study in the yeshiva of Samuel Aboab, meanwhile continuing his studies under Manasseh Gentili, who had moved to Venice.

Morpurgo later attended the University of Padua, earning a degree in medicine in 1700.

== Career ==
In 1704, Morpurgo published 'Eẓ ha-Da'at, a philosophical commentary on Jedaiah Bedersi's Beḥinat ha-'Olam. Appended to the volume was a satirical critique of Kabbalistic teachings by Jacob Frances, which led to backlash from some rabbis in Padua. Despite this controversy, Morpurgo continued his rabbinic studies and received rabbinic ordination in 1709 from Leon Briel, the chief rabbi of Mantua.

Shortly thereafter, Morpurgo joined the rabbinate of Ancona, working alongside Joseph Fiametta. He later married Fiametta's daughter. Upon Fiametta's death in 1721, Morpurgo became the sole rabbi of Ancona, a position he held until his own death in 1740.

== Contributions ==
Morpurgo was recognized as a respected authority in rabbinic circles. His critical views on specific rabbinic rulings were cited by Giovanni Bernardo De Rossi. An approbation he issued in 1716 was included by Isaac Lampronti in his encyclopedic work Paḥad Yiẓḥak. He maintained correspondence with prominent Jewish scholars of the time, including Abraham Segre and Moses Ḥagiz, particularly in discussions concerning Moses Ḥayyim Luzzatto.

In addition to his rabbinic duties, Morpurgo was a practicing physician. During an influenza outbreak in Ancona in 1730, he provided critical medical care. His efforts were acknowledged by Pope Benedict XIV, then the Archbishop of Ancona, who awarded him an official testimonial in appreciation of his service.

Morpurgo left a number of responsa on the four parts of the Shulḥan 'Arukh. These were posthumously published by his son, Moses Ḥayyim Shabbethai, in Venice in 1743, complete with annotations and an introductory essay. He also composed a liturgical prayer beginning with the words "Anna ha-El ha-gadol ha-gibbor veha-nora," intended for recitation by visitors to cemeteries.
