= Abraham ben Mordecai Galante =

Abraham ben Mordecai Galante (died before 1589) was an Italian kabbalist born in Rome at the beginning of the 16th century. He emigrated to Safed with his brother Moses. Abraham, like his father Mordecai and his brother Moses of Safed, is represented by his contemporaries as a man of high character who led a holy life. Being wealthy, he erected a splendid mausoleum over the tomb of Simon ben Yoḥai at Meron, which is still admired.

He was the author of the following works:

- Ḳin'at Setarim, a commentary on Lamentations, based upon the Zohar, edited by his son Samuel in the collection Ḳol Bokim (Venice, 1589)
- Yeraḥ Yakar, a commentary on the Zohar, the first part of which (Genesis) was abbreviated by Abraham Azulai and included in his Zohore Ḥammah
- Zekut Abot, a commentary on the Sayings of the Fathers, mentioned by Hananiah of Monselice in his commentary on the Pirḳe Shirah. Galante was also the author of halakic decisions, which are still extant in manuscript.

He was also a prolific scribe, who made various manuscript copies of kabbalistic works, including Moses ben Jacob Cordovero's Pardes Rimonim.

== See also ==
- Galante (pedigree)

== Jewish Encyclopedia bibliography ==
- Azulai, Shem ha-Gedolim, s.v.;
- Michael, Heimann Joseph, (1891) Or ha-Ḥayyim, Frankfort-on-the-Main (in Hebrew), p. 89;
- Orient. Lit. vi.211;
- Hermann Vogelstein and Paul Rieger, Geschichte der Juden in Rom, p. 86.
