= Galante (pedigree) =

Family tree

Galante is the surname of a Jewish family which flourished at the beginning of the 16th century in Rome, and the head of which, Mordecai, was a Spanish exile of the Angel family. His courteous manners won for him from the Roman nobles the surname "Galantuomo" (gentleman), a name which the family retained. About this time the family settled in the Land of Israel, where it produced authors and other celebrities, among them the following:

- Abraham ben Mordecai Galante - (d. 1560, Italian kabbalist)
- Moses ben Mordecai Galante - (d. 1608, Safed)
  - Jonathan ben Moses Galante - (17th-century rabbi at Safed)
    - Moses ben Jonathan Galante - (1621 – 1689, Jerusalem), was the first Rishon LeZion (Sephardic chief Rabbi of Israel).
- Mordecai Galante - (d. 1781, chief rabbi of Damascus)
  - Moses Galante - (d. 1806, chief rabbi of Damascus)
