= Severino Galante =

Italian painter

Saverino or Severino Galanti (ca. 1750–1827) was an Italian painter, active in Abruzzo and Naples. In his hometown, hev painted the walls of the "Palazzo Pignatelli."

He was born in Civitella Casanova, Abruzzo, Kingdom of Naples. Severino painted both genre and landscape, as well as sacred subjects. He worked in Loreto Aprutino for nearly seven years, and became a pupil of Anton Raphael Mengs and then Pompeo Batoni. In Naples, he worked with Giuseppe Bonito, then moved away from the city to Apulia and Calabria.

He did not make friends easily, and was said to flee to Dubrovnik and wander abroad, because of his "bizarre and intolerant genius". In Naples he painted allegorical subjects in praise of the Bourbons, and illustrated with drawings in book, then well known in Greece and Rome. After returning to Italy, he often to was seen mingling in the streets, in the taverns, and markets, searching for persons in dramatic situations. Thus he painted "the bailiffs, martyrs, and confessors".
