= Judah Vega =

Dutch rabbi (fl. 16th-17th century)

Judah Vega (fl. 16th–17th century) was the first rabbi of the second synagogue of Amsterdam, Neveh Shalom, which was established in 1608. After a short time, he resigned from his office, and in 1610 went to Constantinople. Here, he is said to have written a work entitled Jazania (?), which shed light on the life of the Jewish people from the time of the second destruction of Jerusalem. Conforte confounds this Judah Vega with another person of the same name (not Bizo), who lived at the same time, and who went from Salonica to Safed, where he conducted a Talmudic school and where he died. Judah Vega was a good preacher and haggadist; his small collection of sermons, entitled Malke Yehudah, appeared at Lublin in 1616.

== Jewish Encyclopedia bibliography ==
- Isaac Trani, Responsa, i. 139;
- De Barrios, Vida de Ishak Husiel, p. 42;
- Conforte, Ḳore ha-Dorot, p. 48a;
- De Rossi-Hamberger, Hist. Wörterb. p. 325;
- Grätz. Gesch. ix. 523.
