= Comfort (magazine) =

American mail order magazine (1888–1942)

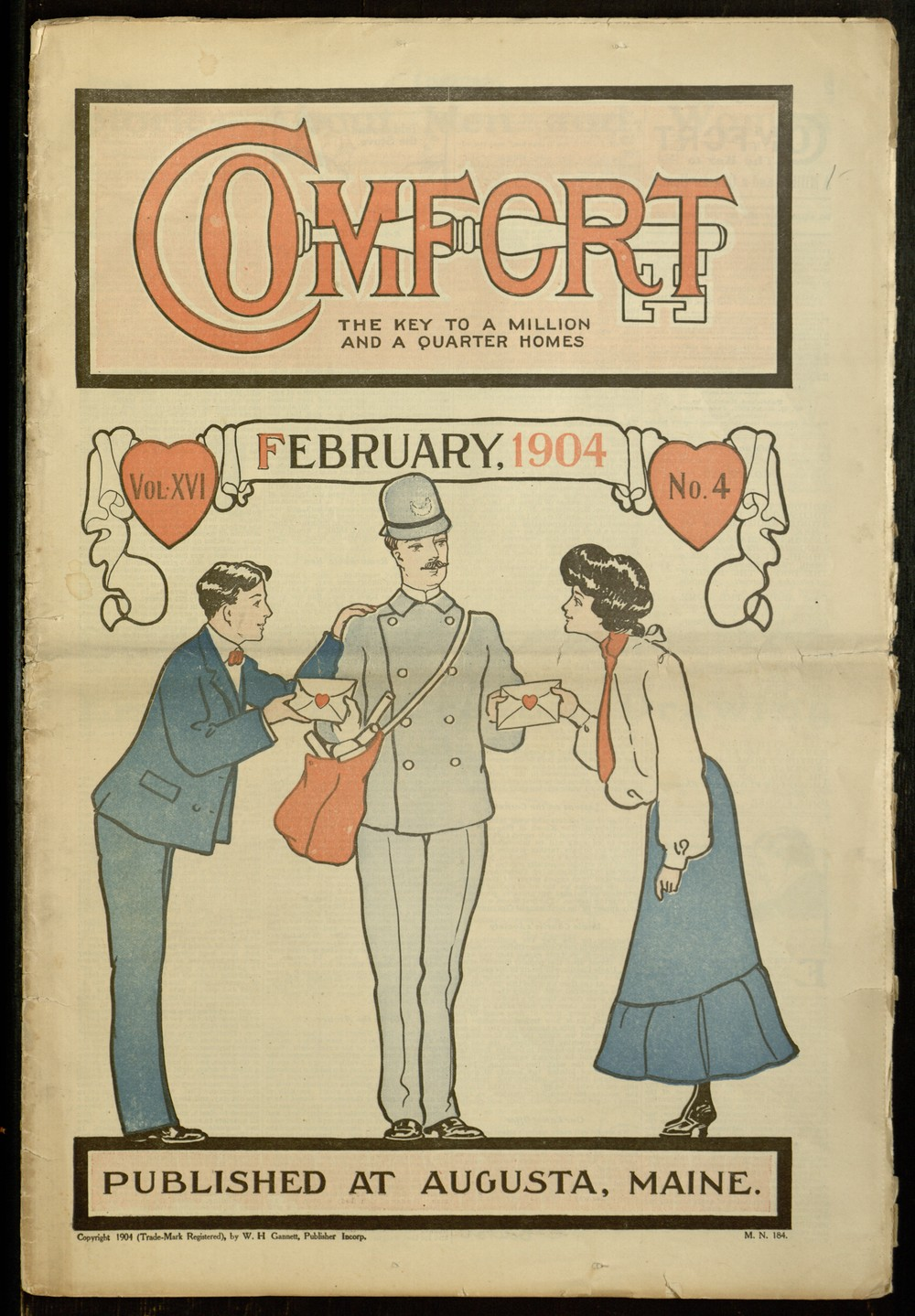
Comfort, v. XVI, no. 4, February 1904

Comfort was a mail order magazine published in Augusta, Maine from 1888 to 1942. Published by Gannet & Morris and edited initially by William H. Gannet, Comfort was touted as "the key to happiness and success in over a million and quarter homes."

In 1888, William H. Gannet created Comfort primarily as a means to advertise his patent medicine, Giant Oxien, a variant of The Moxie Nerve Food. Comfort's circulation increased from 13,000, in 1888, to 1.3 million, in 1894, which made Comfort the first publication in America to reach a circulation of 1 million. In order to handle this increase in circulation, Gannet purchased a new rotary color convertible web-fed press, which was one of the first of its kind in the country.

The increase in Comfort's circulation was primarily due to its use of premiums to generate subscriptions. Premiums, essentially rewards like sewing machines or clothing, were given to people who submitted "clubs" or lists of new subscribers. As Frank Luther Mott notes in his book, A History of American Magazines, the use of the "'club' device made the solicitor virtually a local subscription agent for the periodical." Most of the time, publishers of mail-order magazines did not depend on the collection of subscription fees and instead generated income by selling their subscription lists to advertisers.

The practice of not collecting subscriptions fees went against the United States Post Office Department's criteria that required publications to maintain "a legitimate list of subscribers" in order to take advantage of the low second-class mailing rate of one-cent per pound. In 1907, as a way to curb further abuse of the second-class postal rate, the US Post Office mandated that all subscription fees must be paid in advance. Many mail-order magazines could not meet this requirement and folded. The publishers of Comfort, who were more firm about collecting payment than other mail-order magazine publishers, lowered Comfort's price to 15 cents a year in order to meet with the new regulations.

To prevent mail-order magazines from becoming little more than advertisement catalogs, the US Post Office also required mail-order magazines provide readers with "information of a public character, or devoted to literature, the sciences, arts, or some special industry." This regulation may explain why Comfort claimed on its front page to be "devoted to art, literature, science, and the home circle." In addition to the columns of advertisements, Comfort provided readers with various articles geared to meet the needs and interests of every member of the rural, American family. With articles like "In & Around the Home", "Comfort Sisters' Recipes", and "The Pretty Girls' Club", much of Comfort was dominated by content for women, which offered advice and information on cooking, sewing, health, and beauty. Comfort also printed articles aimed at men, although not as many, such as "The Modern Farmer" and "Automobile and Gas Engine Helps". For children, Comfort occasionally published puzzles, activities, and comics.

Another prominent feature of Comfort was its short and serialized fiction. When Comfort was first published, much of the fiction was written by William H. Gannet as a means to further plug Giant Oxien and other products displayed in the magazine's advertisements. From roughly September 1892 to April 1902, Comfort offered prizes to readers who submitted works of fiction for publication. In later years, Comfort went on to publish fiction written by more legitimate and well known authors such as Augusta Jane Evans, Mrs. Georgie Sheldon, Horatio Alger Jr., Charles Felton Pidgin, and L. M. Montgomery. The fiction published in Comfort was usually highly moral and typically fell into three genres: Adventure, Mystery, or Sentimental Romance. Additionally, Comfort printed stories for children. The Cubby Bear stories, written by Lena B. Ellingwood and illustrated by Harrison Cady, were the most regular children's fiction published in Comfort.

In 1940, Comfort was sold to the Needlecraft Publishing Corporation. Needlecraft Publishing continued to publish Comfort for two years until it was combined with Needlecraft magazine, which ceased to be published soon after.
