= Visitación Conforti =

Argentinian botanist

Profª. Dra. Visitación Teresa Dora Conforti de Marconi (born 1953) is an Argentine biologist, algologist, botanist, taxonomist and ecologist. She is a professor in the Department of Biodiversity and Experimental Biology in the University of Buenos Aires in Buenos Aires. She is noted for her numerous taxonomic studies of Euglenophyta, including in polluted rivers in Argentina. Camaleão Lake in Brazil in 1994 and the Caura River in Venezuela in the late 1990s.

== Life ==
Visitación Teresa Dora Conforti de Marconi was born in 1953. In 1973 she obtained her degree in Biological Sciences from the University of Buenos Aires. At the same university, in 1983 she defended her doctoral thesis on Morphology, taxonomy and stereo ultrastructure of the euglenophyta of the Buenos Aires area.

She has specialized in the kingdom of the Protists, contributing several scientific works on the subject. She is one of the leading researchers into euglenids in Latin America.

From September 1988 to the present, she has been a full-time associate professor.

== Selected publications ==
=== Papers ===
- V. Conforti. 2010. Ultrastructure of the lorica of species (Euglenophyta) from New Jersey, USA. Algological Studies 135, 15–40 resumen en línea
- I. Rocchetta, M. Mazzuca, V. Conforti, I.B. Ruiz, V. Balzaretti, M.C. Ríos de Molina. 2006. Effect of chromium on the fatty acid composition of two strains of Euglena gracilis. Environmental Pollution 141: 353-358 en línea
- l.B. Ruiz, M.C. Ríos de Molina, v. Conforti. 2006. Chromium toxicity to Euglena gracilis strains depending on the physicochemical properties of the culture medium. Bull. Environ. Contam. Toxicol. 76: 512-521
- M.A. Nundelman, S. Rossi, V. Conforti, R. Triemer. 2003. Phylogeny of Euglenophyceae based on SSU rDNA sequences: taxonomic implications. J. of Phycol. 39(1): 226-235
- Iara Rocchetta, L. Ruiz, G. Magaz, V. Conforti. 2003. Effects of Hexavalent Chromium in Two Strains of Euglena gracilis. Bull. Envir. Contamination and Toxicology 70(5): 1045-1051
- V. Conforti, L. Ruiz. 2002. Euglenophytes from Chunam reservoir (South Korea) I. Euglena Ehr., Lepocinclis Perty and Phacus Duj. Algological Studies 104: 81-96
- V. Conforti, L. Ruiz.. 2001. Euglenophytes from Chunam reservoir (South Korea) II. Trachelomonas Ehr. Algological Studies 102: 117-145
- V. Conforti, M.C. Pérez. 2000. Euglenophyceae of Negro River, Uruguay, South America. Algological Studies 97: 59-78
- V. Conforti, L. Ruiz. 2000. Morphological study of the lorica of Trachelomonas spillifera Schkorbatov (Euglenophyceae). Algological Studies 98: 109-118
- E. Linton, M.A. Nudelman, V. Conforti, R. Triemar. 2000. A molecular analysis of the Euglenophytes using SSU rDNA. J. Phycol. 36: 740-746
- D. Echeverrai, V. Conforti. 2000. Euglenoid Flagellates present in the gut of microhylid tadpoles of Argentina. Alytes 18 (1-2): 81-89
- V. Conforti. 1999. Taxonomic and Ultrastructural Study of Trachelomonas Ehr. (Euglenophyta) from Suptropical Argentina. Criptogamie Algologie 20(3): 167-207
- V. Conforti. 1999. Diferentes aplicaciones el microscopio electrónico de barrido (MEB) en el estudio de los euglenofitos. Conferencias sobre aspectos metodológicos en algas. Soc. Arg. de Botánica. Notas Botánicas: 47-48
- C. Rojo, E. Oortega-Mayagoitia, V. Conforti. 1999. Fitoplancton del Parque Natural de las Tablas de Daimiel I. Las euglenofitas. Anales del Jardín Botánico de Madrid 57(1): 15-23
- A. Nudelman, R. Lombardo, V. ConfortiI. 1998. Comparative analysis of envelopes of Trachelomonas argentinensis (Euglenophyta) from different aquatic environments in South America. Algological Studies 89 (1-4): 97 - 105
- L. Ruiz, V. Conforti. 1998. Euglenofitos pigmentados del refugio natural educativo Ribera Norte (San Isidro). Bol. Soc. Arg. Bot. 33 (3-4): 141-148
- V. Conforti. 1998. Morphological changes of Euglenophyta in response to organic enrichment. Hydrobiologia 369/370: 277-285
- V. Conforti. 1998. Ultrastructure of the pellicle of some euglenoid flagellates from subtropical Argentina. Iheiringia 50: 49-66
- V. Conforti. 1991. Taxonomic study of the Euglenophyta of a highly polluted river of Argentina. Nova Hedwigia, 53 (1-2): 73-98
- G. Teu, V. Conforti. 1986. Euglenophyta pigmentadas de la Argentina. Bibliotheca Phycologica 75: 163-182
- V. Conforti. 1981. Contribución al conocimiento de las algas de agua dulce de la provincia de Buenos Aires. IX. Physis {Buenos Aires). B. 40: 77-83

=== Books and chapters ===
- V. Conforti. 2001. Integrante especialista en la redacción del Capítulo "La contaminación del agua", pp. 107–160. En 'Diagnóstico Ambiental del Área Metropolitana de Buenos Aires" Sistema de Información Ambiental, J. M. Borthagaray, R. Fernandez Prini, M. A. Igarzábal de Nistal, E. San Romáan y Mabel Tudino. Ed. de la Fac. de Arquitectura, Diseño y Urbanismo, UBA
- V. Conforti. 2000. Capítulo "Los Protistas". En Biología, H. Curtis y N. Sue Barnes, Cap. 28, pp. 773–795, Ed. Médica Panamericana, Buenos Aires, Argentina
- V. Conforti. 1998. Morphological changes of Euglenophyta in response to organic enrichment. Phytoplankton and Trophic Gradients, Developments in Hydrobiology 129: 277–285. Kluwer Acad. Press
- C. Louza, V. Conforti. 1993. Apuntes verdes. Ed. Tekne. 58 pp.
- Guillermo Tell, V. Conforti. 1986. Euglenophyta pigmentadas de la Argentina. Facultad de Ciencias Naturales de la UBA. Buenos Aires. 301 pp. ISBN 3443600026
- V. Conforti. 1983. Morfología, taxonomía y estereoultraestructura de las Euglenophyta del área Bonaerense. UBA, Facultad de Ciencias Exactas y Naturales. 550 pp.

== Sources ==
- Giorgi, Adonis (2014), Historias de protistas (in Spanish), Editorial Dunken, ISBN 978-987-02-6491-0
- "Visitación Conforti", Researchgate
