= Comfort Omoge =

Nigerian musician

Comfort Omoge was a Nigerian musician known as the queen and chief exponent of Asiko music, a traditional African folklore music of the Ikale people in the Western State of Nigeria.

Married to the traditional ruler of Igbodigo who also encouraged her music passion; she performed with her 15-17 member band, named Aboba Asiko, who used mostly traditional percussive instruments, while she sang a modern interpretation of traditional folk songs of her people. In 1976, she released her first album Orogen rogen. In 1980, while signed with Afrodisia/Decca Records, she released the album, Irore re yi ran, where she infused Christian teachings in her traditional music.

She died in 1999.
