= Comfort Lake =

Lake in the state of Minnesota, United States

- Location within Minnesota
- Location: Chisago County, Minnesota
- Coordinates: 45°19′15″N 92°56′51″W
- Type: lake

Comfort Lake is a lake in Chisago County, Minnesota, in the United States.

Comfort Lake was named for John W. Comfort, a local physician who settled there close to Peterson Point.

== See also ==
- List of lakes in Minnesota
