= Theodore Galante =

American architect (born 1963)

- Theodore Galante, Architect
- Born: New York City, United States
- Occupation: Architect
- Practice: The Galante Architecture Studio
- Buildings: Davenport Central Fire Station Boston EMS FDNY Engine Company 63 Harvard Ceramics Harvard Educational Portal Harvard University Boston Facilities Moleskine Falmouth Recreation Center Ashby Library BFD Engine Company 51
- Website: https://www.galantearchitecture.com

Theodore "Ted" Galante is an American architect who has received critical recognition for his designs of university, municipal and key commercial buildings. His clients have included Harvard University, MIT, Tufts University, Boston University, the New York City Fire Department, City of Boston, and many others.

== Early and personal life ==
As a child, Galante worked with his father in his metal working shop and helped build a family home, learning many hand skill trades along the way. One key component was preparing drawings for parts of the house to be built. By the time Galante entered college, he was skilled as a draftsman and had spent three years as architect’s apprentice.

Galante earned his first professional degree after five years of study, leaving his undergraduate program with a Silver Medal in Design. He completed his Master of Architecture degree from the Cranbrook Academy of Art in Bloomfield Hills, Michigan.

== Works ==
After Galante finished his Masters program, Cranbrook appointed him as its first staff architect at Cranbrook since the 1950s. Galante attended architectural advisory council meetings at Cranbrook, where he was influenced by architects such as Tod Williams Billie Tsien Architects and Steven Holl. Galante collaborated on campus projects with architects Dan Hoffman, Juhani Pallasmaa, and Peter Rose.

In 1997, Galante established The Galante Architecture Studio in Cambridge, Massachusetts. One of Galante's early projects was the Falmouth Recreation Center and Field House (2001) in Falmouth, Massachusetts. It illustrates Galante's refined approach to form making. Published in Architecture Magazine, the Falmouth building reflects Galante’s focus on material, form, and function. Another early project was a rear addition to the Ashby Free Public Library (2004) in Ashby, Massachusetts. The Ashby building hinges on a generous wetland field. Galante set the building hovering above the ground plane with a long gestural cantilever, preserving landscape views from the library reading room. Rather than taking over the site, the building rolls gently down the slope, sustainably working with the environment.

Acceptance to Mayor Bloomberg’s NYC Design and Construction Excellence Program formed a key intersection for The Galante Architecture Studio with projects increasing in complexity and design scrutiny (2005). One result of this program was a new Fire Station for the FDNY which was included in the publication We Build the City, New York City’s Design and Construction Excellence Program by ORO Editions (2013).

In 2005, Galante was selected as the Distinguished Visiting Critic at the Boston Architectural College (2005), leading to a solo exhibition of Studio Works, along with a lecture and design studio teaching position.

After designing building interiors at Harvard University, the Studio was commissioned the university's Ceramics Studio (2013) in the Allston neighborhood of Boston.

Galante speaks nationally about design trends of Fire Station buildings from the world over. He has designed and built public safety buildings in Boston, New York, Davenport, Iowa, among other cities. The work in New York has been the subject of Station Style Design Awards (2013). In a nod to the tradition of architecture, he has designed and built buildings, but also furniture, objects, and elements of varying scale. Many of the buildings have been published in trade periodicals such as Architecture and Architectural Record, while his furniture has been published in Dwell Magazine.

His awards include early recognition from the Architectural League of New York and the Boston Society of Architects (1998).

== Boston EMS & 2019 German Design Award ==
In 2016, the new EMS Facility replaced a dilapidated garage located on the historic grounds of the old Boston Sanatorium. Working in concert with the City of Boston Public Facilities Department, The Galante Architecture Studio built a building that provides security and stature through its solid shell and minimalist form.

The approximately 10,500 square foot structure comprises 11 bays, each capable of double loading and outfitted with a vehicle exhaust system, which house emergency vehicles already in Boston EMS’s fleet, plus additional equipment provided by Homeland Security in the wake of the 2013 Boston Marathon bombing. The building features a robust thermal envelope, efficient LED lights and day lighting units, and low-flow plumbing fixtures to help make the building energy efficient and maximize the City’s investment over the long run.

Boston EMS was the 2019 German Design Awards winner for Excellent Communications Design Architecture. The jury stated, "The timelessly clear, straightforward architecture is designed entirely with function in mind. A good design that also impresses in terms of energy efficiency."

== Awards ==
- Boston Society of Architects: Young Architects Award for Design of the Vawter House (1998)
- Boston Society of Architects: Your Architects Award for Design of Children’s School Lockers (1998)
- Boston Society of Architects: Honor Award for Design for the Falmouth Recreation Center (2003)
- Fire Chief: Station Style Design Award for Engine Company 63 FDNY (2013)
- F.I.E.R.O.: Fire Station Design Excellence for Engine Company 63 FDNY (2014)
- Architizer A+ Awards: Plus Categories | Architecture + Workspace Category. Popular Choice Winner for Ceramics Studio (2014).
- The Architect's Newspaper: Best of Design Award for Civic – Administrative for Boston Emergency Medical Services Facility (2017)
- F.I.E.R.O.: Fire Station Design Excellence for Davenport Fire Department Headquarters (2017)
- F.I.E.R.O.: Conference Popular Choice Award for Davenport Fire Department Headquarters (2017)
- German Design Award: Boston EMS Facility (2019)
- F.I.E.R.O.: Merit Award for Fire Station Design Excellence for New Bedford South Public Safety Center (2021)
- F.I.E.R.O.: Commendation for EMS Facility Design Excellence for the Boston EMS Vehicle Storage Facility (2024)
- F.I.E.R.O.: Recognition Award for Northbridge Fire Headquarters (2025)
- F.I.E.R.O.: Commendation Award for Cambridge Fire Station 10 (2025)
