= Pat Comfort =

American politician (1930–2006)

Member of the Washington House of Representatives for the 26th district
- In office 1961–1965

Personal details
- Born: Patrick Connell Comfort; September 21, 1930 Tacoma, Washington, U.S.
- Died: December 9, 2006 (aged 76)
- Party: Republican
- Occupation: attorney

Patrick Connell Comfort (September 21, 1930 – December 9, 2006) was an American politician in the state of Washington. He served in the Washington House of Representatives from 1961 to 1965 for district 26. Comfort died on December 9, 2006, at the age of 76.
