= Jose "Pepe" Galante =

Argentinian winemaker

Jose "Pepe" Galante is an Argentine winemaker in the Uco Valley, Mendoza. He is considered by many to be the father of modern wine making in Argentina.

== Life ==
Jose Galante studied oenology at the Facultad Tecnologica de Enologia e Industrias Frutihorticolas "Don Bosco" in Rodeo del Medio, Maipu, Mendoza. He later taught as this University during his career at Catena group.

== Winemaking ==
Galante, along with Paul Hobbs, modernized wine making in Argentina, transforming Argentine wine and bringing quality Argentine wine, most notably malbec, to the U.S. market under the Bodega Catena Zapata label. The 1999 Bodega Catena Zapata Nicolas Catena Zapata Mendoza Cabernet Sauvignon Malbec blend, made by Jose Galante, was well received and awarded 93pts from Wine Spectator, one of the first Argentine wines to do so. He worked at Catena Zapata for 34 years before becoming chief winemaker for Bodegas Salentein. At Salentein, Galante continues to focus on the international reputation of malbec, especially that of wines made from high altitude fruit.

In 2015, Galante celebrated his 40th harvest in Argentina with a tour to the United States.
