= A. B. Comfort =

American politician (1884–1974)

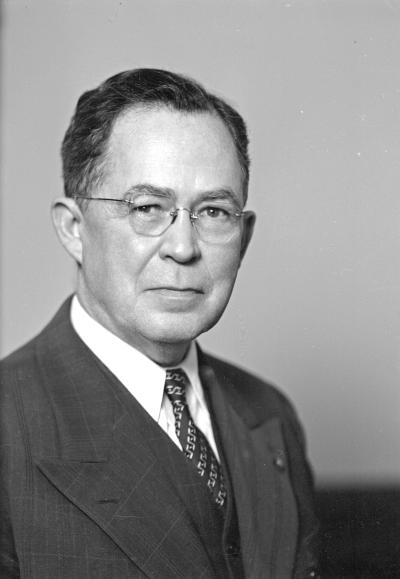
- Comfort in 1947

Member of the Washington House of Representatives for the 26th district
- In office 1943–1961

Personal details
- Born: May 8, 1884 Waubay, South Dakota, United States
- Died: October 1974 (aged 90) Tacoma, Washington, United States
- Party: Republican

Arthur Blaine Comfort (May 8, 1884 – October 1974) was an American politician in the state of Washington. He served in the Washington House of Representatives from 1943 to 1961 for District 26.
