= Mordecai Galante =

Mordecai Galante (died 1781) was Chief Rabbi of Damascus during the Ottoman era and author of Gedullat Mordekai, a collection of sermons preserved in manuscript at Damascus (Ḥazan, Ha-Ma'alot li-Shelomoh, p. 50).

== See also ==
- Galante (pedigree)
