= Moses Galante =

Syrian rabbi

Moses Galante (died 1806) was chief rabbi of Damascus during the late 18th century and early 19th century.

He succeeded his father, Mordecai Galante, who was chief rabbi until his death in 1781. Moses Galante was also a noted scholar and the author of Berak Mosheh (responsa) [Ḥazan, Ha-Ma'alot li-Shelomoh], published 1780 in Livorno.

== See also ==
- Galante (pedigree)
