= Nicola Conforto =

Italian composer (1718–1793)

- Born: Nicola Conforto; 25 September 1718; Naples, Italy
- Died: 17 March 1793 (aged 74); Aranjuez, Spain
- Occupation: Composer
- Era: Baroque

Nicola Conforto (25 September 1718 – 17 March 1793) was an Italian composer.

He studied music in his hometown at the Conservatorio di Santa Maria di Loreto (Music conservatories of Naples), under the tutorship of Giovanni Fischetti and Francesco Mancini . After receiving his training, he made his debut during the carnival of 1746 in Naples as an opera composer with La finta vedova (The false widow). In the following years, he staged his other works both in Naples and in Rome; the fame he achieved thanks to these successes meant that in 1750, he received the commission from the Teatro San Carlo for his first opera seria, Antigonus .

In 1749, he married the singer Zefferina Anselmi, with whom he had three children.

In 1751, he wrote the cantata Gli orti esperidi (The Hesperides gardens) in honor of the Empress Maria Theresa of Austria, to celebrate the name day of the Spanish king Ferdinand VI on 30 May 1752. He presented the drama Siroe, and on 23 September 1754 for the birthday celebrations of the King of Naples Charles III, he presented L'eroe cinese (the Chinese hero). These latter two works gained much acclaim in Madrid, so much so that in 1756, he was named compositore d'opera di corte (composer of the work of the court). Later he received the title of Kapellmeister, but despite this his importance as a composer began to decline and in his later years he devoted himself less to creating compositions writing only occasionally music for the holidays.

His style involved beautiful and pleasing melodies, similar to other composers in the Iberian peninsula. He played an important part in establishing the taste for Italian operas in Spain. His works were sung by Italian singers with bilingual librettos. His church music, written after 1759, shows the influence of Feijoo, who argued against the use of violins in liturgical music. Of his nine Lamentations for solo soprano and orchestra (1766) the three for Good Friday dispense with violins, while the first for Holy Saturday omits strings except violas d'amore; his Miserere for three choirs (1768) is accompanied by violas and woodwind. His instrumental music includes sinfonias for string orchestra, a toccata for harpsichord and a mandolin concerto in D major.
