= Nehemiah Hayyun =

Bosnian rabbi (c. 1650 – c. 1730)

Nehemiah Hiyya ben Moses Hayyun (Hebrew: נחמיה חייא חיון, c. 1650 – c. 1730) was a Bosnian Kabbalist linked to Sabbateanism. His parents, who were Sephardic Jews, lived in Sarajevo in the Ottoman Empire, where he was most likely born; later in life, he pretended that he was a meshulach born in Safed. He received his Talmudic education in Hebron.

== Excommunicated at Jerusalem ==
In his eighteenth year, he was appointed rabbi of a congregation in Üsküp (Ottoman Turkish: اسكوب, now Skopje, North Macedonia). However, he held this position only for a brief period. Thereafter, he led a wandering life as a merchant, scholar, or mendicant: a tzadik seeking adventures of love. From Üsküp, he went to Palestine, followed by Egypt. In 1708, he appeared in Smyrna, where he found adherents willing to help him publish his Mehemnuta de Kulla and thus secure a rabbinical position.

In his Mehemnuta de Kulla, Ḥayyun asserted that, rather than the unqualified monotheism it is traditionally associated with, Rabbinic Judaism worships a trinitarian God akin to mainstream Christianity. This God, he declared, embodies three partzufim (faces): the "Ancient of Days", the "Holy King", and the Shekhinah.

Ḥayyun's contribution to the book consists only of two commentaries; a Sabbatean pupil wrote the text anonymously. Leaving Smyrna, Ḥayyun traveled to Jerusalem. The rabbi of Smyrna warned the rabbis of Jerusalem of his heresies. The immediate consequence was that even before his arrival, the rabbis of Jerusalem excommunicated him for heresy—even though they had not read his work—and condemned the work to burning.

== At Prague ==
Excommunicated, he met little sympathy anywhere (1709-1711). In Venice, however (1711), with the approval of the rabbis of that community, he had printed an extract from his work, under the title Raza di-Yiḥuda, into the beginning of which he had woven the first stanza of a lascivious Italian love song, La Bella Margaritha, with a mystical hymn entitled Keter 'Elyon.

In Prague, where he lived from 1711 until 1712, he found an appropriate soil for his teaching. Joseph Oppenheim, the son of David Oppenheim, received him. The Kabbalistic rabbi of Prague, Naphtali Cohen, was also greatly impressed with his personality. He even highly recommended the Keter 'Elyon, basing his judgment on fraudulent testimonials. Here Ḥayyun delivered sermons which had a Sabbatean background, which he had printed in Berlin (1713) under the title Dibre Neḥemyah. Moreover, he played the role of a wizard; a person who interacted with Elijah, capable of resurrecting the dead, and creating new worlds. By writing amulets, he earned the money he needed for gambling. He also managed to obtain friends in Vienna, Nikolsburg, Prossnitz, Breslau, Glogau, and Berlin, and formed political connections with Löbel Prossnitz of Moravia. In Berlin (1713), the community of which city was then split into two parties, he succeeded in having his book Mehemnuta de Kulla, or Oz le-Elohim, printed with the approval of the Berlin rabbi, Aaron ben Benjamin Wolf.

== In Amsterdam ==
On the prestige he obtained from his book he now tried his fortune in Amsterdam. Almost from the outset he encountered the antagonism of Tzvi Ashkenazi, rabbi of the Ashkenazi congregation of Amsterdam, who mistook him for a different Ḥayyun, an old enemy of his. Ḥayyun surrendered his book to the board of the Esnoga of the Spanish and Portuguese Jews for permission to sell it. Distrusting their rabbi, Solomon Ayllon, this board brought the matter before Tzvi Ashkenazi, who detected its heretical character and called for its author's expulsion.

At this point, however, Ayllon, under the threat of Ḥayyun to reveal his past life as a Sabbatean to the whole of Amsterdam, became his defender, and made Ḥayyun's cause entirely his own and that of the Portuguese community. The result was that the board of his synagogue charged Ayllon to form a commission to reexamine Ḥayyun's book. Without awaiting the decision of this commission, Tzvi Ashkenazi and his anti-Sabbatean friend Moses Hagiz excommunicated Ḥayyun on July 23, 1713. They published their decision in pamphlets, which were answered by counter pamphlets, significantly increasing the ill will between the Sephardic and Ashkenazi communities of Amsterdam.

== Left Amsterdam ==
The Portuguese commission announced its decision on August 7, 1713. Despite the objections of two members of the commission, one of them Ayllon's son, they declared Ḥayyun entirely guiltless of heresy, and he was rehabilitated in a solemn assembly of the great Amsterdam synagogue. But many other outside congregations excommunicated Ḥayyun, and his disreputable antecedents and the deceptive means by which he acquired introductions were exposed, especially by Leon Brieli, the aged rabbi of Mantua. Despite this, the members of the Portuguese commission adhered to their decision but felt bound to exonerate themselves publicly, and for this purpose issued "Ḳoshṭ Imre Emet," a pamphlet that was not without apparent misstatements. Protected by the Portuguese, Ḥayyun could even insult his opponents in pamphlets, and did so. He attacked Tzvi Ashkenazi, in Ha-Tzad Tzvi, Amsterdam, 1713; Joseph Ergas, in Shalhebet Yah and Ketobet Ḳa'ḳa; Tzvi Ashkenazi, Moses Ḥagiz, and Leon Brieli, in Pitḳa Min Shemaya; Moses Ḥagiz, in Iggeret Shebuḳin, Amsterdam, 1714. Finally, Ḥayyun left for the Levant. The introductions given to him by his supporters were of little avail; wherever he went, the doors were barred against him.

In August 1724, through the influence of a vizier, he succeeded in Constantinople by absolving himself from the excommunication on the condition that he should abstain from teaching, writing, and preaching Kabbalah. Under oath, he promised this, but subsequently broke his word. Thus rehabilitated, he went to Vienna and managed, by urging his teachings and professing his intention to convert the Jews to Christianity, to obtain a letter of protection from the Austrian emperor. However, he secretly sympathized with the Sabbateans and still openly professed to be a Jew. However, his game had been played. Before the walls of Prague, he faced starvation. In Berlin, he threatened to convert to Christianity if support were denied him. His friends in Amsterdam, even Ayllon, thus forsook him. In April 1726, he was excommunicated in Hamburg and finally in Altona. He fled to North Africa, where he died. His son converted to Christianity and endeavoured to avenge his father by allegedly calumnious attacks on Judaism.
