= Giovanni Luca Conforti =

Italian composer

Giovanni Luca Conforti (1560 – May 11, 1608) was an Italian composer and prominent falsetto singer who wrote an exercise book about Baroque embellishments, Breve et facile maniera d'essercitarsi ad ogni scolaro or Brief and easy manner of exercising for every student, still in use today.

== Biography ==
Conforti, also spelled Conforto, was born in Mileto, Calabria, around 1560. He sang in the Papal chapel from 1580 to October 31, 1585. He and several of his colleagues were expelled for joining the Congregazione dei Musici di Roma, membership of which was forbidden to papal singers, though he was later allowed to rejoin.

In 1586, he was reportedly serving the Duke of Sessa when Cardinal Scipione Gonzaga and protonotary Camillo Capilupi recommended him for service at the court of Mantua, and in the letters they provide descriptions of Conforti's voice and style. When Capilupi heard him sing Lenten music at Santa Trinità, he proclaimed him the best falsettist in Rome, praising Conforti's resonance, improvization, and ornamentation. Cardinal Gonzaga's letters say Conforti sang both contralto and soprano skillfully, the first with a full voice, and the latter with a sweet tone. His skill came to impress many, and he was considered a prominent virtuoso soloist.

That same year, Conforti is known to have sung at the Santissima Trinità dei Pellegrini, a place all well-known musicians of the time performed. In 1595, he performed in a Lenten ceremony at the Arciconfraternita del Santissima Crocefisso under the direction of Luca Marenzio, a prominent Roman composer.

Conforti ended up not going to Mantua due to bureaucratic lagtime, but went to serve at S Luigi dei Francesi under Ruggiero Giovanelli in Tivoli. He was there from June 1, 1587 to April 30, 1588. In 1591, he again served the Papal chapel, serving there, in Rome, until his death in 1608.

== Works ==
=== Brief and Easy Manner of Exercising for Every Student ===
Conforti's Breve et facile maniera d'essercitarsi ad ogni scolaro is one of only a few books on vocal embellishment written at the end of the sixteenth century. It is also specifically addressed to instrumentalists ("quei che sonano di Viola, o di altri instromenti da fiato"), and thus forms part of the substantial 16th-century Italian literature of diminution and ornamentation which begins with the Fontegara of Silvestro Ganassi in 1535 and includes the treatises of Diego Ortiz, Giovanni Maffei, Girolamo Dalla Casa, Giovanni Bassano, Riccardo Rogniono, Giovanni Battista Bovicelli and Aurelio Virgiliano. There are three original copies known to exist, two in the British Library and one in the Civico Museo Bibliografico Musicale Giovanni Battista Martini in Bologna. All have the same nearly unreadable publication date, usually read as 1593, though there is no external evidence to support this or any other date.

The book was written for students to quickly and easily learn the art of ornamentation. According to Conforti, this goal could be achieved in a few months by following his method.

The treatise is user-friendly in its layout. Each section deals with an ascending or descending interval, showing passages in various rhythmic patterns that get progressively more difficult. The 2nd, 3rd, 4th, 5th, octave and unison are addressed. Also included are more elaborate passages, a table of conventional ornaments, and examples of embellished cadences. A conclusion is included, which explains the examples.

In his conclusion, "Declaration about the passages to the readers," Conforti states that his method is meant to help to embellish the singing of those who do not come by it naturally. He recommends learning and memorizing each section in nine days, learning all the exercises in less than two months. Upon completing the exercises, singers are meant to be able to add his embellishments into their sung lines, as well as improvise their own embellishments.

Conforti also confides that his exercises are not exhaustive, and he only included those he judged to be the most appealing, leaving out others in order to create less confusion on the page. He emphasizes the importance of following one's ear when embellishing and understanding which notes will create a consonance.

The manual was written for the benefit of singers, but Conforti also encourages its use by instrumentalists as finger exercises, suggested ornaments, and a method for learning to improvise ornaments on one's own.

=== Other works ===
In addition to the Breve e facile maniera, he also wrote three volumes of settings of the Vesper psalm and Magnificat for three voices and basso continuo. He applies his own system of embellishment, as laid out in the Breve e facile maniera, in his three volumes of Salmi passaggiati.

In addition to his own works, Conforti collected and compiled others. He collected Paolo Quagliati's two volumes of three-voice Canzonette (Rome, 1588) for publication and wrote the dedications. The second of these contains Conforti's own Amara vita è quella de gl'amanti. He compiled the Psalmi, motecta, Magnificat, et antiphona Salve Regina diversorum auctorum, published in 1592.
