= Buber =

Buber (Hebrew: בובר) is a Jewish surname. Notable people with the surname include:

- Martin Buber (1878–1965), Austrian-born Israeli Jewish scholar, socialist and Zionist
- Solomon Buber (1827–1906), grandfather of Martin, Jewish scholar and editor of Hebrew works
- Margarete Buber-Neumann (1901–1989), daughter-in-law of Martin
