= Solomon Ayllon =

Dutch Sephardic haham

Haham Solomon Jacob Ayllon
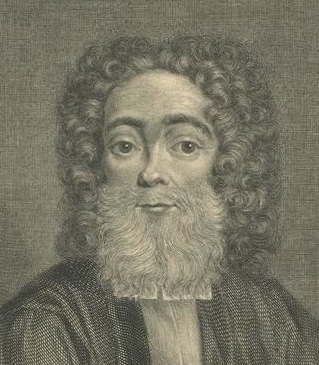

Personal life
- Born: between 1655 and 1665 Salonica, Ottoman Empire
- Died: 10 April 1728 Amsterdam, Netherlands

Religious life
- Religion: Judaism

Solomon Ayllon (c. 1655 or c. 1660 – 10 April 1728) was Haham of the Sephardic congregations in London and Amsterdam, and a follower of Shabbethai Ẓebi. His name is derived from the town of Ayllon, in what is now the province of Segovia.

Ayllon was neither a general scholar nor a Talmudist of standing, but his history is closely interwoven with that of Sabbateanism (Sabbatai Zevi, Nathan of Gaza and Nehemiah Hayyun) in both the East and the West.

== Life ==
Ayllon's youth was spent in Salonica, which was probably his birthplace, although some say that Safed was the place, however, many Sabbateans claimed to be of Palestinian birth. He associated with the Sabbatean circles of Joseph Philosoph, Solomon Florentin, and other leading spirits of antinomian and communistic tendencies. There he is said to have married as his divinely appointed spouse a woman from whom another man had separated without the formality of a divorce, only to experience that she soon left him for a third spouse, whose "affinity" seemed holier to this strange sect than the bonds of lawful matrimony.

In 1687 his daughter Gratia was born in Jerusalem. One year later, he visited Europe as a meshullaḥ (messenger) from the Palestinian congregations to collect funds for the poor of Palestine, leaving his wife and children domiciled in Safed, and having apparently publicly broken with Sabbateanism. From Livorno, where he was in 1688, he repaired to Amsterdam and thence to London, where, after a few months' stay, he was appointed haham on 6 June 1689.

=== London ===
The next year, however, he was vigorously attacked by a member of the congregation, named Jacob Fidanque, who had heard something of Ayllon's antecedents. The Ma'amad, caring more for its dignity than for the truth, endeavoured to suppress the scandal, but Ayllon's position was so hopelessly undermined by the exposure, that all the really learned members of the congregation would not submit to the new haham, which caused considerable friction, in spite of a pronunciamento ("haskamah") issued by the Ma'amad that under penalty of excommunication it was forbidden "to any one except the appointed haham to lay down the law or to render any legal decision".

Ayllon, in a letter to Sasportas six years later (1696), still complained bitterly of the unbearable relations between him and his congregation, and inasmuch as his Sabbatean proclivities began to reassert themselves, and the congregation just then began to consider the propriety of asking for his resignation (M. Ḥagis, l.c.), he resolved to leave London, (Homerton Hackney?) and was glad to accept an appointment as associate rabbi of the Sephardic congregation of Amsterdam, 1701.

Ayllon's first blunders in his new home took place in 1700, when he pronounced harmless a heretical work by Miguel Cardoso (probably the work "Boḳer Abraham," still extant in manuscript), which he had been requested to examine by the Ma'amad.

This latter body, however, was somewhat distrustful of its ḥakam, and sought additional opinions from other learned authorities. They gave their opinion that Cardozo's work merited public burning, and this sentence was actually carried out.

=== Amsterdam ===
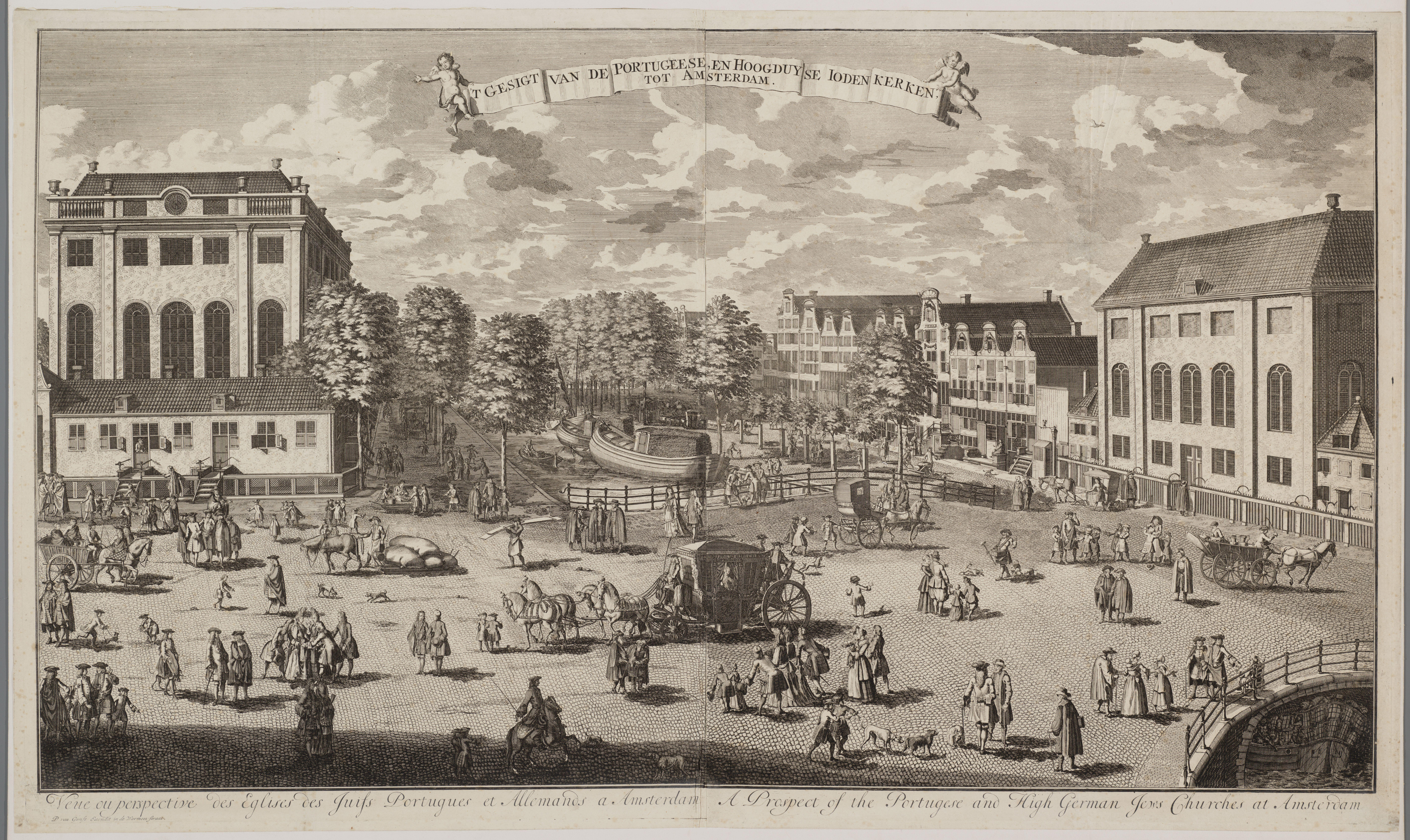
Abraham Rademaker, t Gesigt van de Portugeese, en Hoogduy[t]se Joden kerken,

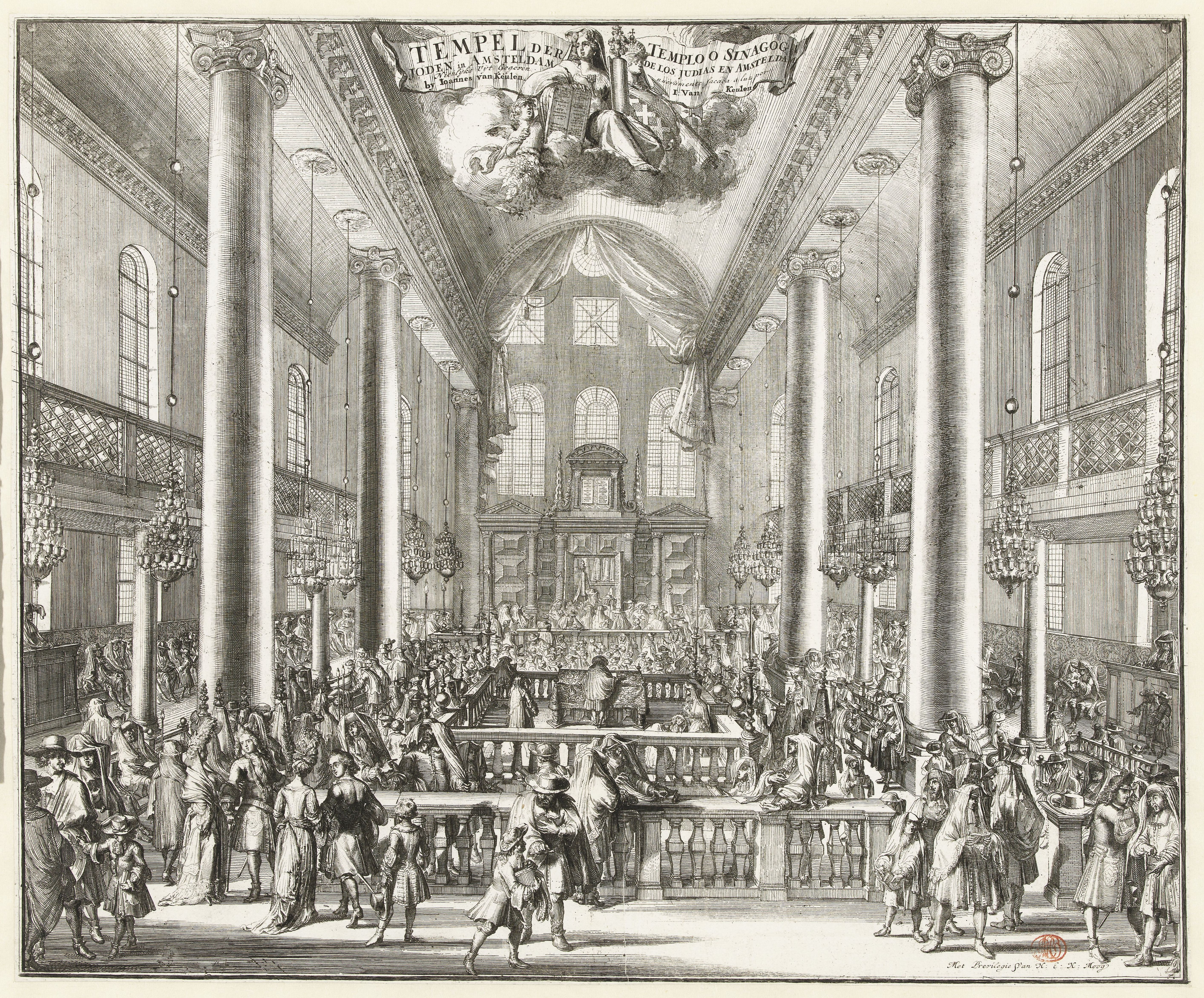
Interior of the Portuguese Synagogue in 1695 by Romeyn de Hooghe

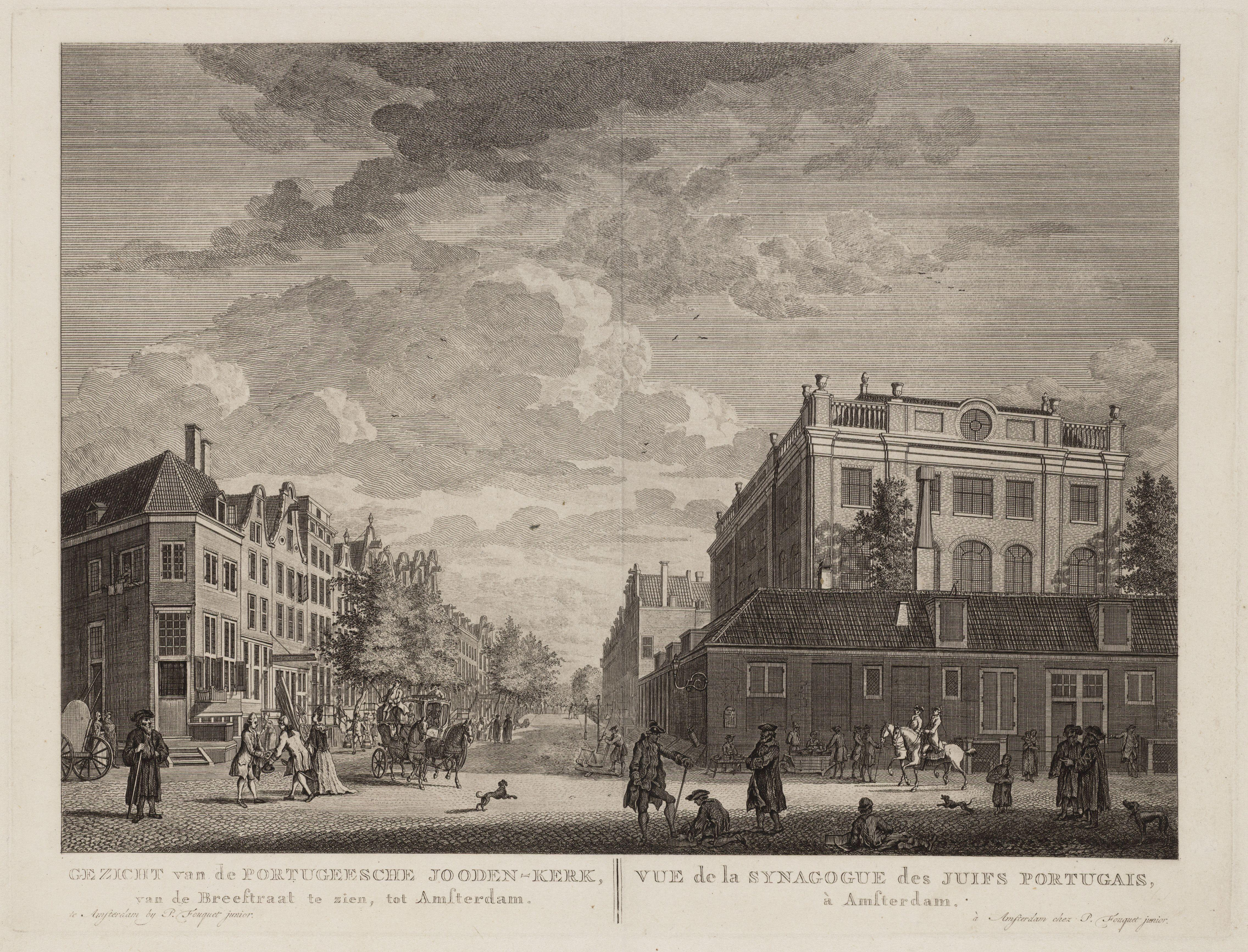
Gezicht van de Portugeesche Jooden-Kerk, van de Breestraat te zien, tot Amsterdam. (Ailion lived at Muiderstraat, left of the synagogue.)

At about this time, Tzvi Ashkenazi came to Amsterdam as rabbi of the Ashkenazic community his advent was a serious matter to Ayllon, as the former completely eclipsed his Sephardic colleague by his superior learning and dignity of character; he was also a noted heresy-hunter in the matter of the Sabbatean movement. The clash could hardly have been averted and Nehemiah Ḥayyun, a notorious Sabbatean, precipitated it.

At the request of M. Ḥagis, Ashkenazi examined the works of Ḥayyun (1711) and denounced them as heretical; in addition, he notified the Ma'amad of the fact. This body, however, did not welcome the advice volunteered by a Polish-German rabbi, and replied that, before taking action, Ashkenazi's opinion would have to be fortified by the assent of Ayllon and other members of their own body. Ashkenazi peremptorily declined this express invitation to sit in council with Ayllon, for he was well aware both of his ignorance of the Cabala and of his suspected affinity with Sabbateanism.

Ayllon saw in this crisis an opportunity to make political capital. He persuaded an influential member of the Ma'amad, a certain Aaron de Pinto, to take up the matter as an attempt on the part of the German rabbi to interfere with the autonomy of the Sephardic community around the Portuguese Synagogue. It is difficult to discover whether Ayllon was actuated herein by secret loyalty to Sabbateanism, or whether, for personal reasons, he merely sought to clear Ḥayyun from the imputation cast upon him. The adventurer was well acquainted with Ayllon's antecedents, and it would have been dangerous to make an enemy of him. Be this as it may, De Pinto succeeded in having a resolution passed by the Ma'amad, declining to permit any such interference in their affairs by the German rabbi, and requesting Ayllon to appoint a committee to give an official opinion upon Ḥayyun's work. The finding of this commission was publicly announced on 7 August 1713 in the Portuguese synagogue, and it ran that Ḥayyun was innocent of the heresy charged against him, and that he had been unrighteously persecuted. The committee consisted of seven members, but its conclusions represented simply Ayllon's opinion, for the other six understood nothing of the matter.

The affair, however, was not closed, for Ashkenazi and Ḥagis had already, on 23 July pronounced the ban of excommunication upon Ḥayyun and his heretical book. In the protracted discussion which ensued between Ayllon and Ashkenazi, a discussion into which the rabbis of Germany, Austria, and Italy were drawn, Ayllon made but a sorry figure, although, as far as Amsterdam was concerned, it might be said to have ended triumphantly for him, seeing that Ashkenazi was compelled to leave the city. Not alone did Ayllon permit his protégé, Ḥayyun, to assail the foremost men in Israel, but he supplied him with personal papers containing attacks upon his opponent Ḥagis. Ayllon was also no doubt the rabbi who laid charges against Ashkenazi before the Amsterdam magistrates, and thus made an internal dissension of the Jewish community a matter of public discussion. It is claimed that upon hearing of the death of Ashkenazi in 1718, Ayllon confessed that he had wronged the man. It is certain that when, a few years later, Ḥayyun visited Amsterdam again, he found matters changed so much that even Ayllon refused to see him.

In 1717 he married 32-years-old Lea Medina. In the notarial record it is written that he came from Salonika. Ayllon died at Amsterdam in 1728.

== Legacy ==
Ayllon left a cabalistic work, a manuscript of which is preserved in the library of the Jews' College in London.
