= Moshe ben Mordechai Galante =

16th-century rabbi and disciple of Joseph Caro

- משה בן מרדכי גאלאנטי

Personal life
- Born: Rome
- Died: c. 1608 Safed, Ottoman Empire
- Parent: Mordechai Galante
- Notable works: Miftaḥ ha-Zohar; Kehillat Ya'aḳob; Responsa
- Known for: Disciple of Joseph Caro
- Occupation: Rabbi

Religious life
- Religion: Judaism

Moshe ben Mordechai Galante (Hebrew: משה בן מרדכי גאלאנטי; died 1608 in Safed), was a 16th-century Sephardi rabbi and kabbalist born in Rome. He emigrated to Safed with his brother Abraham. Moshe was a disciple of Joseph Caro, and was ordained by Caro when he was only twenty-two years old. He wrote sermons for a wedding, for Passover, and for a thanksgiving service, printed with the younger Obadiah Bertinoro's commentary on the Book of Esther (Venice, 1585). He also wrote Miftaḥ ha-Zohar, an index of Biblical passages found in the Zohar and additions from old manuscripts (ib. 1566), Kehillat Ya'aḳob, a kabbalistic commentary on Ecclesiastes (ib. 1577–78), and responsa with additions by his son Jedidiah Galante (ib. 1608). He succeeded Moses ben Joseph di Trani as Av Beit Din of Safed in 1580.

== See also ==
- Galante (pedigree)
