= Tzvi Ashkenazi =

Dutch rabbi

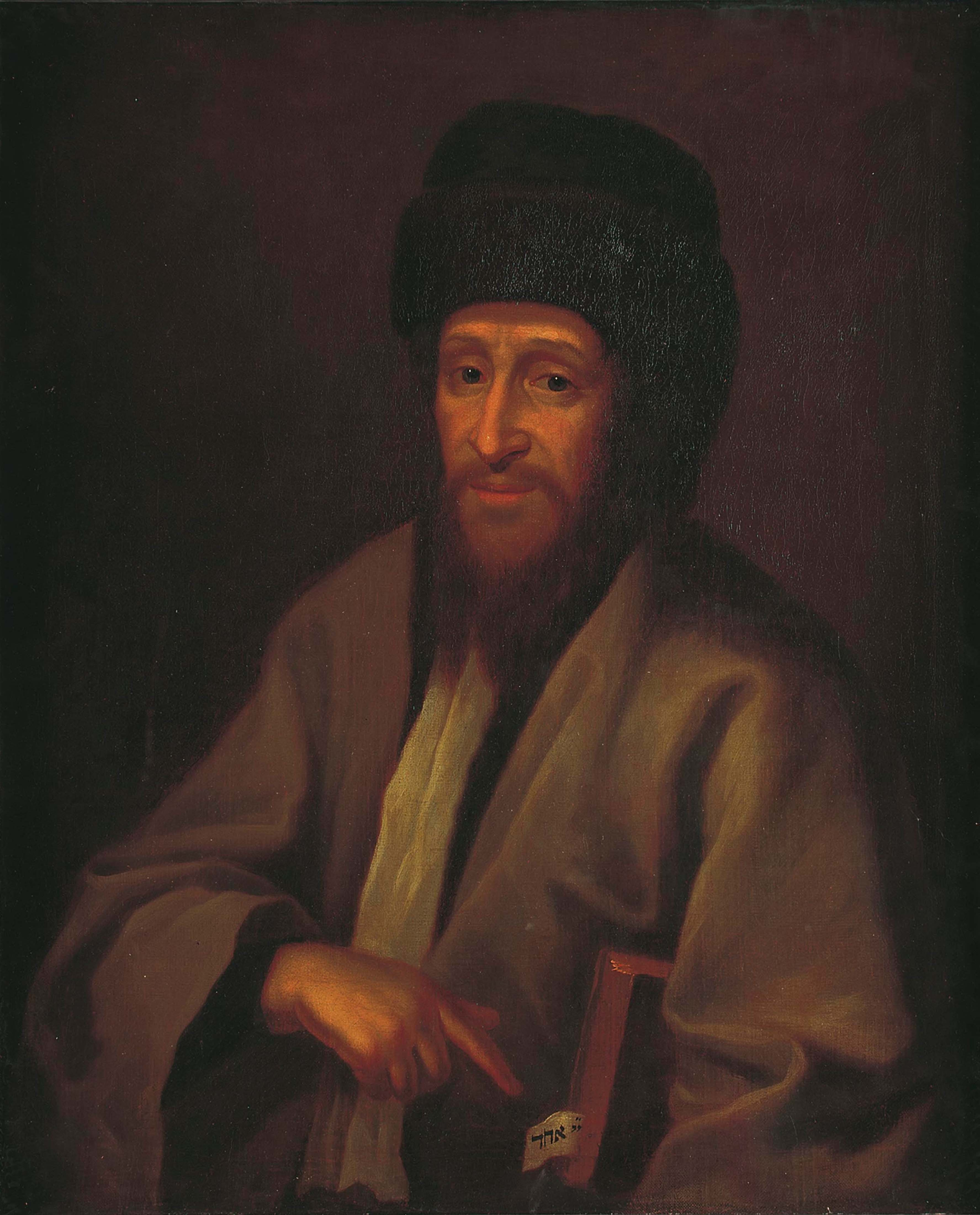
- Oil portrait of R. Tzvi Hirsch Ashkenazi painted in 1714, during his visit to England. The portrait is currently held at the Jewish Museum London.

Personal life
- Born: 1656 Moravia
- Died: 2 May 1718 (aged 61–62) Lwów, Poland
- Children: Jacob Emden

Religious life
- Religion: Judaism

Jewish leader
- Yahrtzeit: 1 Iyar

Tzvi Hirsch ben Yaakov Ashkenazi (Hebrew: צבי אשכנזי; 1656 – 2 May 1718), known as the Hakham Tzvi after his responsa by the same title, served for some time as rabbi of Amsterdam. He was a resolute opponent of the followers of the self-proclaimed messiah, Sabbatai Zevi. He had a chequered career due to his independence of character. He visited many lands, including England, where he wielded much influence. His responsa are held in high esteem.

== Early life and education ==
Ashkenazi was born in 1656 in Habsburg Moravia, most likely in Gross Meseritsch (now Velké Meziříčí) where his father, Jacob Wilner, was active. He was descended from a well-known family of scholars, a grandson of Ephraim ha-Kohen who in turn was the son-in-law of a grandchild of Elijah Ba'al Shem of Chelm. He spent most his childhood in Alt-Ofen (now Óbuda, Budapest) where his grandfather served as rabbi. Tutored by his father and grandfather, he later went to Thessaloniki, where he attended the school of Eliyahu Kovo and devoted himself to an investigation of the Sephardi methods of study. He also witnessed the impact of the Sabbatean movement on the community, an experience which significantly influenced his career. Upon his return journey, he seems to have stayed some time, probably until 1679, in Istanbul, where his learning and astuteness made such an impression he became known by the Sephardic title Hakham "rabbi", an honorific he retained throughout his life. Shortly after his return to Alt-Ofen, he married into a prominent and wealthy local family.

== From Bosnia to Germany ==
In 1686, Alt-Ofen was invaded by the Austrian army, and a cannon-shot killed Ashkenazi's young wife and his daughter. He fled, becoming separated from his parents, who were taken captive by the Prussian army of Frederick William, Elector of Brandenburg, and proceeded to Ottoman Bosnia, where he received an appointment as rabbi in Sarajevo. He remained in that city until 1689, when he resigned because of contention with his congregation and left for Germany. In Berlin, he married Sarah (died at Lemberg 23 January 1719), the daughter of Meshullam Zalman Mirels Neumark, chief rabbi of Altona, Hamburg, and Wandsbek.

On his father-in-law's advice, he went in 1690 to Altona, where leading congregation members founded a Kloyz and installed Ashkenazi as rabbi. This Kloyz became celebrated, and pupils assembled from all parts to hear him. His income as a rabbi of the Kloyz was only 60 thalers annually, so he was compelled to defray his living expenses by engaging in various business pursuits (e.g. dealing in jewelry). After the death of his father-in-law, whom Ashkenazi had latterly aided in his official duties, one party in the Jewish community wished to have Ashkenazi installed as rabbi of the three congregations (the unity known as AH"U), while another party favored the election of Moses ben Alexander Rothenburg. Finally, it was decided that both candidates should serve alternately, each for six months. Friction and strife over religious questions ensued, and finally became so intense that, in 1709, Ashkenazi deemed it advisable to resign and resume his duties as the rabbi of the Kloyz.

== Amsterdam ==
=== Appointment and welcome ===
Less than a year later, on 10 January 1710, Tsvi received a letter of appointment to the chief rabbinate of the Ashkenazi congregation of Amsterdam. In addition to free residence, the office had a yearly salary of 2,500 Dutch guilders. This was a large sum, since fifty years later, 375 guilders was the usual salary of the chief rabbi of Berlin. Unselfish and independent by nature, Ashkenazi renounced the perquisites of his office, such as fees in civil suits, to maintain his independence, and accepted the high position only upon the condition that under no circumstances was he to be required to subordinate himself to the congregation, or to be obliged to receive gifts, and that he should be permitted to preserve absolute freedom of action on all occasions.

Tsvi encountered a hostile party in Amsterdam, the principal leader of which was Aaron Polak Gokkes. Indeed, the difficulties with the directors became so serious that on 26 May 1712, it was decided to dismiss the chief rabbi at the end of his three-year term mentioned in his appointment letter. Ashkenazi announced that he would not, under any circumstances, accept this dismissal, which he regarded as unjust. Serious difficulties arose. The rabbi's salary does not seem to have been paid, for in the register of the records of the congregation it is stated that on Saturday 4 Nisan 5472 (12 April 1712), the parnasim sent a secretary and two attendants of the congregation to Ashkenazi to inform the latter that upon the return of the letter of appointment, he would be paid the money to which he was still entitled. Ashkenazi declined to return this piece of evidence, a copy of which has been preserved among the official documents of the congregation.

=== The Hayyun incident ===
On 30 June 1713, Nehemiah Hayyun arrived in Amsterdam and requested permission from the Portuguese congregation to circulate his writings, which had been published in Berlin. Ashkenazi thought Hayyun was an old enemy of his from Sarajevo and Salonica, and at once requested Solomon Ayllon, Hakham of the Portuguese congregation, not to accord patronage to the stranger, who was unfavorably known to him. Ashkenazi believed himself justified in making this demand, as the Portuguese congregation and its rabbi had, from the beginning, treated him most courteously, and had already, during his term at Altona, repeatedly sent to him from the Sephardim of Hamburg, Amsterdam, and London religio-legal questions for his decision. Hayyun called on Ashkenazi personally and made an explanation, but Tsvi retracted his accusation, stating that it was a case of mistaken identity.

Meanwhile, several members of the Portuguese congregation had submitted Hayyun's writings to the judgment of Moses Hagiz, a messenger from Jerusalem then sojourning at Amsterdam, who immediately discovered their Sabbatian principles and tendencies and gave the alarm. He also called the attention of Ashkenazi to the dangerous doctrines published in Hayyun's book, whereupon the rabbi again warned the directorate of the Sephardim congregation not to support the author. Ashkenazi rejected a proposition to designate the objectionable passages and declined to act as a member of a committee of investigation because he did not regard Ayllon, the rabbi of the Sephardim, as a competent authority on such questions. A fierce contention ensued, during the progress of which Hagiz fought valiantly beside Ashkenazi.

Both sides issued many pamphlets, in which the contestants indulged in the most vehement abuse of each other. On 23 July 1713, Ashkenazi placed Hayyun under ḥerem because the investigating committee appointed by the Sephardic directorate had not yet made its report. In consequence of this measure, both Ashkenazi and Chagiz were subjected to street attacks, more particularly at the hands of the Portuguese, who threatened to kill them. Amid the constantly increasing bitterness and animosity, the committee report, which had been prepared by Ayllon alone, was publicly announced. It was to the effect that the writings of Hayyun contained nothing which could be construed as offensive to Judaism. It was publicly announced in the synagogue that Hayyun was to be exonerated from every suspicion of heresy, and on the following day, a public reception was tendered him at the synagogue, on which occasion unparalleled honor was shown him. Naturally, the Sephardic opponents of Ashkenazi had found excellent support among the rabbi's adversaries in his German congregation. The controversy was now waged so fiercely that even the family life of the community became affected, and all peace vanished from the otherwise model congregation of Amsterdam. Ashkenazi was deserted, except for a few friends who remained faithful to him. When, finally, he was summoned by the directors of the Portuguese congregation to appear before their tribunal, which had no jurisdiction, he refused to do so, as he anticipated that he would be asked to retract and to praise and recommend Hayyun.

=== Placed under ban ===
Through an advocate for Christians, the directorate again summoned Ashkenazi to appear on 9 November 1713. When he again refused, he and Moses Hagiz were formally placed under the ban by the Portuguese community. Ashkenazi was temporarily placed under arrest in his own home (probably to protect his life) by the municipal authorities, who had been influenced against him by Ayllon and the Portuguese leaders; and the whole matter was brought before the magistracy to secure Ashkenazi's deposition and banishment from Amsterdam.

The magistrates thereupon sought the opinions of certain professors at Leiden, Utrecht, and Harderwijk, including Willem Surenhuis and Adriaan Reland, on the dispute. Their decision is unknown.

== London ==
Ashkenazi forestalled the magisterial action by resigning his office and fleeing, at the beginning of 1714, from Amsterdam, perhaps secretly, with the aid of his friend Solomon Levi Norden Lima. After leaving his wife and children at Emden, he proceeded to London at the invitation of the Sephardic congregation of that city. In 1705, he was invited to pronounce a judicial decision concerning the orthodoxy of the rabbi David Nieto, who had given utterance to allegedly Spinozistic views in a sermon. In London, Ashkenazi found many friends and received many tributes of regard. Even before this, he had been invited to take the rabbinate of the Sephardic congregation, but refused. It seems that his portrait in oil was painted here, after he had refused, on account of religious scruples, to have his bust stamped on a coin. In the following spring, he returned to Emden and proceeded to Poland by way of Hanover, Halberstadt, Berlin, and Breslau, stopping at each place for some time. After spending two years in Staszów, Poland, he was called to Hamburg to serve as member of a judicial body convened to settle a complicated legal question.

When Simha Cohen Rapoport died in 1717, Ashkenazi was called as rabbi to Lemberg, where he stood in high repute in his congregation and the community. Four months after entering upon this office, he died.

== Praised by contemporaries ==
Ashkenazi was known for his firm, selfless, and passionate temperament, though his abrupt manner often caused friction with affluent and scholarly circles. His extensive learning, intelligence, and linguistic abilities made him one of the most distinguished rabbis of his time. Contemporary accounts, including those from individuals who knew him primarily as head of the Klaus in Altona, praised his profound scholarship, intellectual sharpness, and clarity of exposition, which avoided the excessive subtleties associated with pilpul. He was also noted for his refusal to accept financial assistance, preferring personal hardship to dependence on wealthy patrons. This trait, however, was sometimes perceived by contemporaries as obstinacy or arrogance and contributed to tensions with influential members of the community.

Of his works, only a part of his responsa have been printed, under the title "Responsa Chacham Tzvi" (Amsterdam, 1712, and since frequently republished). They are distinguished by lucidity of treatment and an undeviating adherence to the subject.

== Descendants ==
His son, Jacob Emden, served as rabbi in Emden and followed in his father's footsteps in combating inroads of the Sabbatean movement; Jacob Javits, a grandson of Jacob who was named for him, served as a United States Congressman. His daughter Miriam was the wife of Aryeh Leib ben Saul, the rabbi of Amsterdam; the mother of Chief Rabbi Hart Lyon; and the grandmother of the first chief rabbi of the British Empire, Solomon Heschel. Ashkenazi's son David was the Av Beit Din of Novyi Yarychiv, Ukraine, and an ancestor of the mother of Chaim Halberstam, Miriam. (See Neil Rosenstein's The Unbroken Chain for details about conflicting opinions as to how Miriam was a descendant of David.) His grandson, Meshullam Solomon, was one of the two opposing Chief Rabbis of the United Kingdom and the rabbi of the Hambro' Synagogue in London.

Yaakov Lorberbaum (1760-1832, known in English as Jacob ben Jacob Moses of Lissa, Jacob Lorberbaum or Jacob Lisser) was the great-grandson of Tzvi Ashkenazi.
