= Hayim Malakh =

Hayim ben Shelomoh Malakh ( 1650–1716/17) was a Jewish rabbi, kabbalist and early proponent of Sabbateanism.

== Early life ==
Ḥayim ben Shelomoh was born in the city of Kalisz, Poland in the 1650s.The details of his early life are unclear, but it is certain that he acquired an extensive Jewish education. It is certain that he was a rabbinic scholar, a kabbalist and a preacher and attracted students and followers. Gershom Scholem describes him as a learned man with a powerful personality. During his youth he was associated with the Sabbatean rabbi Joshua Heschel Zoref of Vilna, who was an early believer in the messianic career of Sabbatai Zevi. In 1690, Ḥayim went to Italy, where he studied with the leaders of the Italian Sabbateans, Abraham Rovigo and Binyamin Kohen Vitali. Together they studied Lurianic Kabbalah and he was introduced to the doctrines of Nathan of Gaza. Returning to Poland in 1692, Ḥayim was largely responsible for spreading Rovigo and Kohen's version of Sabbateanism among Polish followers of the movement. During this period he was the teacher to Mordecai Suskind Rotenburg, rabbi of Lublin. His missionary work attracted the attention of rabbi Tzvi Ashkenazi who was the father of Jacob Emden. They remained lifelong foes.

Around 1694, Malakh went to Turkey and stayed with Samuel Primo in Adrianople, where he received the secret traditions of Sabbatai Zevi’s direct disciples. In that same year he went to Podolia—the Polish province that in the years 1672–1699 was part of the Ottoman Empire—and spread radical Sabbatean teaching. Some two years later, Malakh had a vision that caused him to return to Poland, where he transformed the Zhovkva Beth Midrash into a center of radical Sabbateanism. He joined the ḥavurah kedoshah (“holy society”) of Yehudah Ḥasid (Judah Segal ha-Levi) of Szydłów and became one of the leaders of the movement.The members of this sect engaged in ascetic exercises; in anticipation of the Messiah, they made public confession of their sins and inserted mystical prayers in their liturgy. Hayyim Malakh joined the circle of Judah Hasid, and brought over to it his Sabbateaan followers. The number of "the Pious" (Hasidim) grew so large that the Orthodox rabbis became alarmed and began to persecute them. Under the effect of these persecutions the leaders of the sect started a propaganda for a mass-emigration to Palestine, there to welcome in triumph the approaching Messiah. Along with Yehudah Ḥasid and Joshua Heschel Zoref, among others, Malakh attended the secret council of Sabbatean leaders in Nikolsburg (Mikulov) in late 1698 or early 1699. Shortly after the council, he challenged rabbis and kabbalists to a disputation on the claim that Sabbatai Zevi was the messiah. The debate took place in Vienna and set a precedent for the public disputation between Frankists and rabbis in Kamenets Podolski in 1757. Avraham Broda of Prague sent two of his pupils—Jonah Landsofer and Mosheh Ḥasid—for the disputation, which, according to some sources ended inconclusively and according to others was a total failure on the part of Malakh's opponents.

According to Jacob Emden Ḥayyim was at first named "Mehallek" (the wanderer), because he traveled to Turkey to learn there the Sabbatean doctrines, which name was afterward changed by his followers to "Mal'ak" (apostle).

=== Pilgrimage to Jerusalem ===
The aliyah of the Hasidim to Jerusalem in 1700 represented a peak of Shabbatean activity. In the beginning of 1700, a troop of one hundred and twenty pilgrims started on their way, under the joint leadership of Judah Hasid and Hayyim Malakh. The emigrants traveled in groups, by way of Germany, Austria, and Italy, stopping in various cities, where their leaders, dressed, after the manner of penitent sinners, in white shrouds, delivered fiery exhortations, in which they announced the speedy arrival of the Messiah. The crowd were particularly impressed by the speeches of the rigorously ascetic Judah Hasid. On the road the Polish wanderers were joined by other groups of Jews desirous of visiting the Holy Land, so that the number of the travelers reached 1300 souls. One party of emigrants, led by Hayyim Malakh, was dispatched, with the help of charitable Jews of Vienna, from that city to Istanbul. Another party, headed by Judah Hasid, traveled to Palestine by way of Venice. After much suffering and many losses on the journey, during which several hundred died or remained behind, one thousand reached Jerusalem. On their arrival Judah Hasid became terminally ill and passed away shortly after. After his death, Malakh was initially accepted as his successor, His adherents were cooped up in some courtyard, and depended on the gifts of charitable Jews. The destitute inhabitants of Jerusalem, themselves living on the charity of their European brethren, were not in a position to support the pilgrims, who soon found themselves without means of subsistence. Disillusioned and discouraged, the sectarians rapidly dispersed in all directions. Some joined the ranks of the Turkish Sabbateans, who posed as Muslims. Others returned to Western Europe and Poland, mystifying credulous people with all kinds of wild tales. Still others in their despair let themselves be persuaded by German missionaries to embrace Christianity. Hayyim Malakh, the second leader of the pilgrims, remained in Jerusalem for some time with a handful of his adherents. In this circle symbolic services, patterned after the ritual of the Sabbatians, were secretly held, and, as rumor had it, the sectarians performed dances before a wooden image of Sabbatai Zevi. According to Jacob Emden also, Ḥayyim carried with him an image of Shabbetai Ẓevi and taught his followers to worship it. These rumors finally forced Malakh to leave Jerusalem.

After leaving Jerusalem he went first to Salonika—where he met the leader of the Dönmeh (the Sabbatean sect of that city), Baruchiah Russo—and then Istanbul. After returning from the Ottoman Empire to Poland, he reportedly established Sabbatean communities in the Podolian towns of Buchach, Nadvirna, and Rohatyn. He spread the gospel of secret antinomianism in Podolia, where he found fertile ground especially in the smaller communities. As his Sabbateanism became a matter of public record, Malakh was persecuted by rabbis and was expelled from Poland; he thereupon went to Amsterdam via Frankfurt am Main. Toward the end of his life he returned to Poland, where he died around 1717.

It seems that most of his journeys were not undertaken on his own initiative; rather, he served as an emissary and a link between different Sabbatean factions. The pattern of his travels reveals the existence of a clandestine Sabbatean network spanning Europe and the Ottoman Empire. Malakh was initiated into all major branches of Sabbatean theology; after his initial flirtation with the moderate Sabbateanism of Rovigo and Kohen, he accepted the much more radical doctrines of Samuel Primo (advocating the deification of the messiah) and Baruchiah Russo(calling for annulment of the commandments). In Adrianople he also studied the teachings of Avraham Cardozo, but rejected them and stuck to the teachings of Primo. Malakh's main impact was in transmitting the teachings of the Turkish Sabbateans to Europe, especially to Podolia. It is likely that many of Jacob Frank’s early disciples came from the communities established by Malakh.

Sabbateanism in Poland remained strong even after Malakh's death. The ill success of the "Hasidim" failed to check the spread of sectarianism. In Galicia and Podolia, the conventicles of "Secret Sabbatians," dubbed by the people "Shabsitzvinnikes" (from the name of Shabbetai Ẓevi), or, in abbreviated form, "Shebsen," continued as before. These Sabbateans neglected many ceremonies, among them the fast of the Ninth of Av, which had been transformed by them from a day of mourning into a festival. Their cult contained elements both of asceticism and libertinism. While some gave themselves over to repentance, self-torture, and mourning for Zion, others indulged in debaucheries and excesses of all kinds. Alarmed by their heresies, the rabbis at last resorted to energetic measures. In the summer of 1722, a number of rabbis, coming from various communities, assembled in Lemberg, and, with solemn ceremonies, proclaimed the cherem (excommunication) against all Sabbateans who should fail to renounce their errors and return to the path of Orthodoxy within a given time.

== Religious significance ==
Malakh was not merely a passive believer in Zevi. He belonged to the generation that attempted to reinterpret the apparent failure of the messianic prophecy and preserve its mystical meaning.

Three features characterized his role:

- Kabbalistic: Malakh drew upon Lurianic Kabbalah and the mystical writings circulating among Sabbatean scholars.
- Messianic: He maintained expectations concerning the continuation or fulfillment of Shabbetai Ẓevi's messianic mission.
- Ascetic and activist: Through his preaching and partnership with Judah He-Hasid, he translated Sabbatean expectations into concrete practices of repentance, asceticism, communal organization, and ultimately migration to Palestine.

Malakh was one of the people who helped transform Sabbateanism from the spectacular messianic movement of the 1660s into a clandestine and increasingly diverse religious phenomenon of the late seventeenth and early eighteenth centuries.

== See also ==
- Jacob Frank
- Sabbatai Zevi
