= Zoref =

Zoref is a Jewish surname. It was originally given to goldsmiths, derived from the Hebrew tsoref. Notable people with the surname include:

- Joshua Heschel Zoref (1633–1700), Lithuanian ascetic and figure in the Sabbatean movement
- Lior Zoref (born 1970), Israeli researcher, author and keynote speaker
- Shlomo Zalman Zoref (1786–1851), Lithuanian rabbi
