= Judah HeHasid (Jerusalem) =

17th-century Jewish preacher

See Judah he-Hasid (disambiguation) for other people who used this name.

Judah he-Hasid Segal ha-Levi (Hebrew: יְהוּדָה הֶחָסִיד, romanized: Yəhūdā heḤasīd, lit. 'Judah the Pious'; c. 1660 in Siedlce – 19 October 1700 in Jerusalem, Ottoman Syria) was a Sabbatean preacher who along with Hayim Malakh led the largest organized group of Jewish immigrants to the Land of Israel in the 17th and 18th centuries.

== Early life ==
Judah he-Hasid Segal ha-Levi was born around 1660 in either Dubno or Siedlce. The circumstances of his early life are unclear. By 1695, he was serving as a maggid in Szydłowiec (Shidlov/Szydlowiec), where he came into contact with the Sabbatean preacher Zadok ben Shemariah. Judah became associated with the Sabbatean current in Poland, although the exact chronology of his conversion or commitment to Sabbateanism is difficult to establish. Gershom Scholem characterized him as a particularly important figure among the Sabbatean pietists of the 1690s. Scholem describes Judah as a famous preacher of repentance who eventually joined forces with Hayim Malakh, a much more explicitly Sabbatean figure.

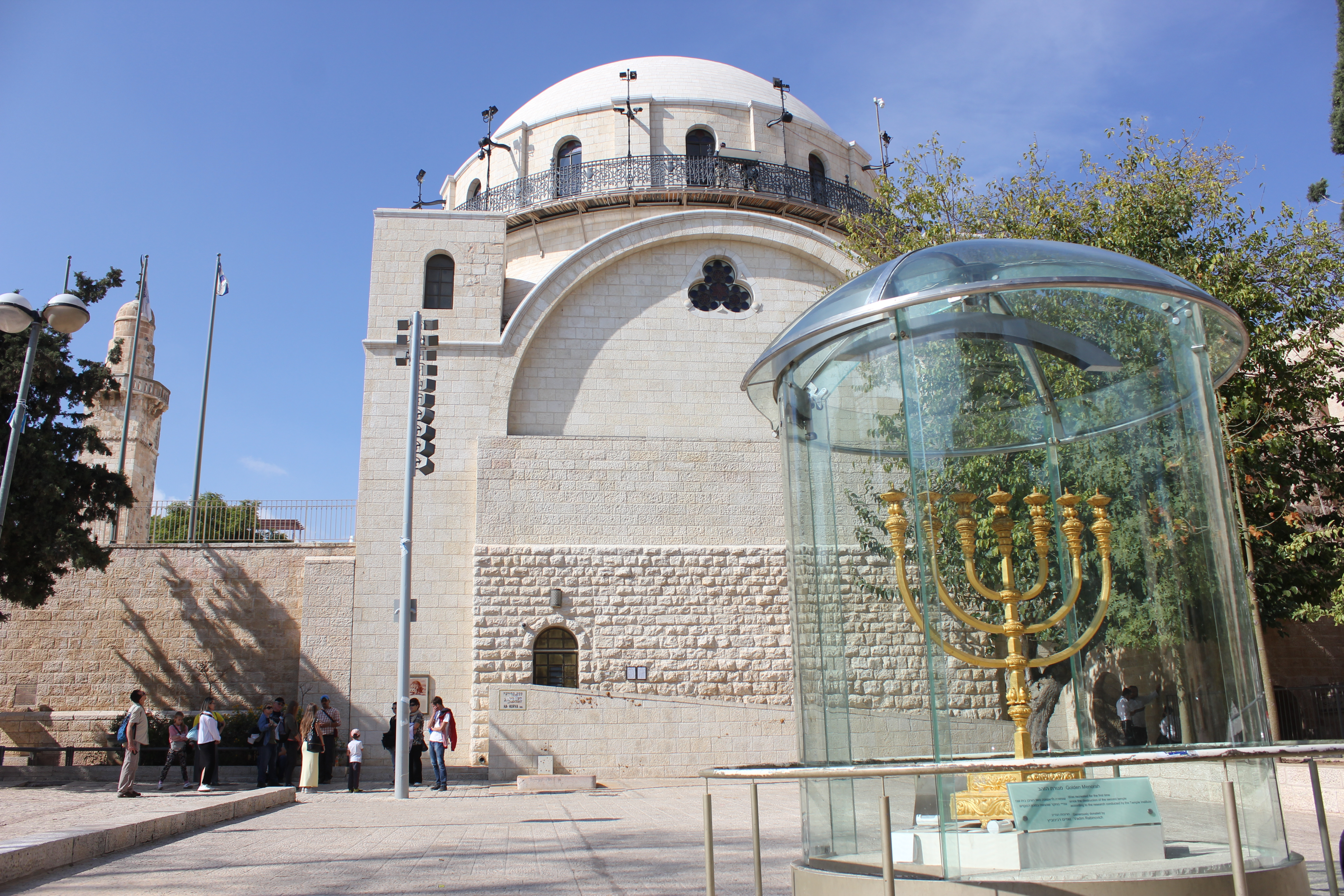
The Hurva Synagogue,, also known as Hurvat Rabbi Yehudah he-Hasid ("Ruin of Rabbi Judah the Pious"), is a historic synagogue located in the Jewish Quarter of the Old City of Jerusalem.

== The holy society ==
Judah he-Hasid and Hayim Malakh formed a group called the Holy Society (Hebrew: חברה-קדושה). The members, expecting imminent messianic redemption and return of Sabbatai Zevi, performed extreme asceticism. They bathed in ice-cold water, avoided beds, abstained from animal-derived foods, slept extraordinarily little, and devoted much of their remaining time to Torah study. His movement was built around a radical program of penitence and preparation for redemption.

The initial group consisted of approximately 31 families. Their objective was to immigrate to the Land of Israel and await the Messiah in Jerusalem. One of the members was Gedaliah of Siemiatycze (גדליה מסימיאטיץ), whose later book, Pray for the Peace of Jerusalem (Hebrew: שַׁ֭אֲלוּ שְׁל֣וֹם יְרוּשָׁלָ֑͏ִם, romanized: Šaʾălu šəlom Yərušālāyim, Berlin, 1716) is an important contemporary source for the expedition.

The Sabbatean character of the group is somewhat complicated. It would be an oversimplification to say that every member was an openly professed Sabbatean. The movement contained different degrees of Sabbatean commitment, from people attracted primarily to its penitential and messianic program to committed Sabbateans.

This ambiguity is historically important. Some rabbis suspected Judah of Sabbateanism, while other prominent rabbis and communal leaders nevertheless supported or assisted the project.

Scholem's interpretation is stronger: he regarded the group as predominantly Sabbatean, with Judah representing a comparatively moderate tendency and Ḥayyim Malakh eventually moving toward a more radical Sabbatean position.

== Messianic expectations and pilgrimage to Jerusalem ==
One of the most important elements of Judah's preaching was the expectation that the messianic process was not finished. Sabbatai Zevi had died in 1676, but Sabbateans continued to develop chronological and theological explanations for his apparent failure. Judah participated in a current that anticipated a renewed manifestation of Sabbatai Zevi around 1706. His preaching therefore had an urgent quality: repentance and ascetic preparation were necessary because redemption was approaching.

This helps explain why aliyah became central to Judah's project. Moving to Jerusalem was not simply an act of conventional piety. For the movement, the gathering of Jews in the Holy Land could itself further the process of redemption.

The original group began its migration from Poland in the late 1690s. In 1699, the emigrants reached Nikolsburg, now Mikulov, in Moravia, an important center of Sabbatean activity. There, according to a report cited in Encyclopaedia Judaica, approximately ten scholars, including Judah ha-Ḥasid, Joshua Heschel Zoref, and Hayim Malakh, met and discussed matters concerning Sabbatai Zevi. The account describes them as “believers” and says that they discussed Sabbatean matters with great enthusiasm until midnight. The group then moved through German and Austrian territories.

In Vienna, they were assisted by Samuel Oppenheimer, who provided them with two ships and funds for the journey. Judah himself traveled among Jewish communities, preaching repentance and soliciting support for the emigration. His reputation as a compelling preacher helped attract additional followers. As the journey progressed, many Jews left the group, remaining in the lands they passed through or returning to their places of origin. Many others perished from disease, sea storms, and various other perils.

The original 31 families eventually became a much larger movement. Estimates vary substantially. Later accounts speak of approximately 1,000–1,500 people, while some sources give smaller numbers for those who actually reached Jerusalem. The number who began the journey and the number who ultimately arrived probably constituted two-thirds of the original group.

The group arrived in Jerusalem on October 14, 1700. At that time, about 200 Ashkenazim and about 1000 Sephardim lived in the city, mostly on charities from the Jewish diaspora. The sudden influx of Jewish immigrants produced a crisis: the local community was unable to help such a large group. In addition, some of the newcomers were suspected to be Sabbateans, whom the local Jewish population viewed with hostility as heretics.

== Death ==
Judah died in October 1700 only days after arriving in Jerusalem. Sources generally give 19 October 1700 as his date of death. This was a devastating blow to the movement. Its charismatic founder had led his followers through years of preparation, migration, and suffering, only to die almost immediately after reaching the destination toward which the entire project had been directed. His death also exposed the fact that the movement lacked a single uncontested successor.

After Judah's death, the group fractured. Hayim Malakh became one of the principal figures among the Sabbatean faction. However, disagreements developed between more moderate and more radical elements of the community. Eventually, Malakh was expelled from Jerusalem and continued his religious work elsewhere. Other members remained in Jerusalem, while still others returned to Europe. The group also accumulated substantial debts, and its economic problems eventually became disastrous.The Ashkenazi community became heavily indebted to Muslim creditors, contributing to the later destruction of the group's synagogue and settlement.

== Legacy ==
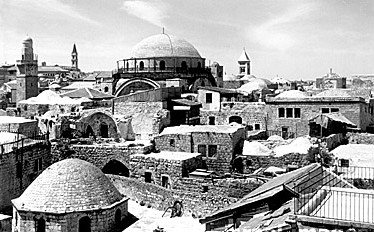
The dome of Hurva Synagogue rises above the Jewish Quarter of the Old City (pre-1948).

Some of the immigrant Ashkenazi Jews left Jerusalem for other cities in the Holy Land, predominantly in other cities holy in Judaism, such as Hebron, Tiberias, and Safed. Others started to dress like Sephardi Jews.

The synagogue HeHasid's group founded after their arrival, the Perushim rebuilt the Hurva Synagogue in 1864, and it became the chief Ashkenazi synagogue in Jerusalem. The building was destroyed by the Arab Legion in the 1948 Arab–Israeli War. It was rebuilt and rededicated in 2010.

A few days before his passing, HeHasid managed to purchase the plot adjacent to the ancient Ramban Synagogue. Known as the old 'Ashkenazi Courtyard', Isaiah Horowitz and his disciples who had immigrated to the Land of Israel about a century earlier, had resided there with the intention of building a synagogue for the city's Ashkenazi community. However, Horowitz' unexpected death left behind substantial debts owed to the Arab builders. As a result of these debts, Ashkenazi Jews were barred from living in Jerusalem for approximately a century. Consequently, Ashkenazi Jews who insisted on living in Jerusalem were forced to pass themselves off as Sephardim, as attested by Rabbi Moshe HaYerushalmi: "A Jew from our lands—Poland or other Ashkenazi regions—is forbidden to enter Jerusalem unless he is dressed in Turkish attire and speaks the Turkish language, such that no one realizes he is Ashkenazi; all this is due to the actions of the group of pious men who arrived with Rabbi Judah he-Hasid the Second (of blessed memory)."

It was not until 1836 (5596) that Shlomo Zalman Zoref, one of the Ashkenazi Jews who had immigrated as part of the Aliya of the Disciples of the Vilna Gaon, succeeded in settling the debts and securing permission for Ashkenazi Jews to settle in Jerusalem. The courtyard was then redeemed, and the Great Ashkenazi Synagogue was built there; it became known as the Hurvat Rabbi Judah heHasid 'Ruin of Rabbi Judah he-Hasid'. This name persisted even after the synagogue was destroyed a second time during the 1948 war.

In 1702, Abraham Rovigo sailed from Livorno to the port of Jaffa with his family and household members as well as the family of Mordechai Ashkenazi and his disciples (totaling about 25 people) to immigrate to the Holy Land. Rovigo established a special yeshiva in Jerusalem dedicated to the study of Kabbalah; the scholars of this yeshiva were drawn primarily from the circle of Judah heHasid.
