= Moses Pinheiro =

Italian rabbi

Moses Pinheiro (d. 1689) was an Italian Jew who lived in Livorno in the seventeenth century. He was one of the most influential pupils and followers of Sabbatai Zevi.

He was held in high esteem on account of his religious and kabbalistic knowledge; and, as the maternal grandfather of Joseph Ergas, the well-known anti-Sabbatean, he had great influence over the Jews of Leghorn, urging them to believe in Sabbatai. Even later, in 1667, when Shabbethai's apostasy was rumored, Pinheiro, in common with numerous other adherents of Zevi, still believed him to be the messiah.

Pinheiro was "the center of the Shabbatean group in Livorno", and he maintained a correspondence with Shabbetai Zevi over the years, after his return from Constantinople to Livorno in 1667. He spent some time with Sabbatai in Constantinople in 1666-67. Nathan stayed at Pinheiro's house on his visit to Italy in 1668.

Pinheiro was the teacher of Abraham Miguel Cardoso, whom he initiated into the Kabbalah and into the mysteries of Sabbateanism.
