= Mattithiah Ashkenazi Bloch =

Personal life
- Born: 1610/1620 Cracow, Poland
- Died: after 1668

Religious life
- Religion: Judaism

Mattithiah ben Benjamin Ze'ev (Wolf) Ashkenazi Bloch (Hebrew: מתתיהו בן בנימין זאב אשכנזי בלוך) was a 17th-century Sabbatean Kabbalist. He was appointed by Sabbatai Zevi as one of his prophets charged with the announcement of the Redemption.
