= Jacob Querido =

Jacob Querido or Yakub Çelebi(‘the Beloved’, ca. 1650–1690, Alexandria, Egypt) was the successor of the self-proclaimed Jewish Messiah Sabbatai Zevi. Born in Thessaloniki, he was the son of Joseph the Philosopher and brother of Jochebed(Esther), Shabbatai Zevi's last wife. Jochebed was the fifith and final wife of Sabbatai Zevi which Sabbatai took as her wife following her father's conversion to Islam on the orders of Sabbatai. Her father was renamed Abdulgaffar Efendi. The marriage took place in 1675 and Querido known as Yakub b. Abdullah became a disciple of Zevi. Sabbatai Zevi became terminally ill in 1676 and according to Donmeh tradition, Querido was the last person to see him alive. The question of authority became problematic after the failed redemption, and Jochebed now known as Aisha was seen as the sacred widow of the messiah. Yakub and Aisha were the last two people to see Sabbatai in exile. On their way back, Yakub carried a letter signed by the Sabbatai proclaiming him as the Caliph (successor) of the messiah. When Aisha returned she claimed Sabbatai Zevi's soul has transmigrated to Yakub and confirmed the authenticity of the letter. Despite some resistance the elders accepted the claim. The dissidents departed for Izmir and later became the basis for the Kapanci community. They believed the messiah was going to return himself and appointing a successor constituted blasphemy. He attracted a considerable following of his own, called Ya‘qōviyīm or Yakubiler. Querido consequently became a major successor figure among Sabbateans in Salonica; together with his father and the Talmudist Solomon Florentin, he attracted a substantial following. Around 1683, a large group of Salonican Sabbateans converted outwardly to Islam, forming an important nucleus of what became known as the Dönmeh. The precise chronology of the mass conversion is disputed in the sources, with dates ranging from 1683 to 1686. Sources claim that such large voluntary conversion of Jews to Islam was never before seen in history. Never before jews embraced islam on mass without compulsion.

Mustafa Çelebi/Baruch Kunio was a rabbi and Kabbalist who embraced sabbateanism and opposed the leadership of Querido and became disciple of another sabbatean leader Baruchiah Russo born nine months after the passing of Zevi. He claimed that the soul of Sabbatai Zevi did not transmigrate to Querido but instead to Baruchiah Russo or Osman Baba. Russo's followers were known as the Karakaş community.

The Yakubi group was much smaller than the Karakaş, whose members claimed that they adhered more closely to Sabbatai Zevi's principles.

Despite some resistance to Yakub's succession, he was successful in managing the community. Some even would compare his role for the donmeh in comparison to Paul for Christianity. Under his leadership, the group overcame the trauma of the failed messiah, institutionalized a new working ideology, with Commandments, and institutions. Even though subsequently the donmeh were divided into three groups, most of the principles he established were utilized by all subdivisions.

Some sources claim Baruchiah Russo was Quierdo's son but this claim is disputed by modern scholarship.

== later life and death ==
The Yakubi's were seen with suspicion by both Jews and Muslims. In order to calm these suspicions they made efforts to perform all Muslim religious practices. In 1688 Yakub Celebi undertook the pilgrimage to Mecca, accompanied by followers, apparently as a particularly emphatic demonstration of his Islamic identity; he died in Egypt on the return journey, probably at Alexandria, around 1690.

his group, the Yakubites were later led by Hajji Mustafa Efendi.
