= Joseph Ergas =

18th-century Italian kabbalist

Rabbi Joseph Ergas

Personal life
- Born: 1685 Leghorn, Grand Duchy of Tuscany
- Died: May 10, 1730 (aged 44–45) Leghorn, Grand Duchy of Tuscany
- Children: 6

Religious life
- Religion: Judaism
- Main work: Shomer Emunim
- Yahrtzeit: 3 Sivan 5490

Joseph ben Emanuel Ergas (Hebrew: יוסף בן עמנואל אירגאס; 1685 – 19 May 1730) was an Italian rabbi and kabbalist. He was a leading critic of Neḥemiah Ḥayyun and of Sabbateanism in general.

== Biography ==
He was born in Livorno in 1685 to Rabbi Emanuel Ergas, head of the community. His maternal grandfather was Moses Pinheiro, a devoted follower of Shabbatai Zevi. He studied Torah in the city's yeshiva under Rabbi Samuel De Pas. He studied Kabbalah for seven weeks under Rabbi Benjamin Kohen Vitale, a student of Rabbi Moses ben Mordecai Zacuto. In 1704 he married Sarah, who bore him six children: three boys and three girls.

Later, he settled in Pisa where he established a yeshiva called "Noah Shalom." He also founded two charities in the city: "Mohar batulot" and "Malbish aryamin". Upon returning to Livorno he was appointed head of the community.

He was renowned for his vast Torah knowledge and many rabbis from Italy and France would send him questions which he would answer clearly and concisely. His most prominent student was Rabbi Malachi ben Jacob ha-Kohen, author of the encyclopedic work Yad Malachi.

He died in Livorno on 3 Sivan 5490 (1730) at the age of 45.

== Work ==
In 1710 the Sabbatean Neḥemiah Ḥayyun came to Livorno attempting to get Ergas' approbation on his book, but Ergas instead expelled him from the city. Ḥayyun went to Amsterdam and printed scathing books of defamation against Ergas. Ergas responded with two polemical books called Tokhaḥat Meguleh and Ha-Tzad Naḥash, which he printed in London in 1715.

He is best known for his kabbalistic work Shomer Emunim. (To distinguish it from the work Shomer Emunim written by Rabbi Aharon Roth, Ergas' book is sometimes referred to as Shomer Emunim Ha-Kadmon.) The work is structured as a dialogue between two characters. Through this work he debates with Rabbi Emanuel Chai Ricci who supported the literal interpretation of tzimtzum. His work is considered a foundational text in Kabbalah and the most prominent representative of the non-literal view of tzimtzum.

He also published a collection of sixty-eight responsa under the title Divrei Yosef (1742).

== Selected publications ==
- Divrei Yosef. Livorno. 1742. Questions and answers.
- Shomer Emunim. Amsterdam. 1736. An introduction to the teachings of Kabbalah.
- Minḥat Yosef. Livorno. 1752. On Kabbalah.
- Mevo Petaḥim. Berlin. 1927. Introduction and rules for the works of the Ari.
- Tokhaḥat Megullah / Ha-Tzad Naḥash. London. 1715. Against Neḥemiah Ḥayyun and Sabbateanism.
