= Castellazzo =

Castellazzo may refer to:

- Castellazzo family, who settled at the beginning of the sixteenth century in Cairo

== Places ==
- Castellazzo Bormida in the Province of Alessandria, Piedmont
- Castellazzo di Bollate, within the municipal boundaries of the commune of Bollate in the Province of Milan, Lombardy
- Castellazzo Novarese in the Province of Novara, Piedmont
