= Aaron Lapapa =

Turkish Oriental rabbi and Talmudist

Aaron ben Isaac Lapapa (c. 1590–1674) was an Oriental rabbi and Talmudist. He was at first rabbi at Manissa, Turkey, and at an advanced age was called to Smyrna as judge in civil affairs. In 1665, when the Sabbatai Zevi movement was at its height there, he was one of the few rabbis who had the courage to oppose the false prophet and excommunicate him. Sabbatai Zevi and his adherents retorted by deposing him and forcing him to leave the city, and his office was given to his colleague, Ḥayyim Benveniste, at that time one of Sabbatai's followers. After Sabbatai's conversion to Islam, Lapapa seems to have been reinstated.

Lapapa was a pupil of Abraham Motal and son-in-law of Solomon Algazi. He wrote: Bene Aharon, responsa and novellæ (Smyrna, 1674); Teshubot, responsa, published in the Abaḳ Derakim of Baruch Kalometi (Salonica, 1714); Yad Aharon, an index to the Talmud and to rabbinical literature (see Benjacob, Oẓar ha-Sefarim). Two other works, a commentary to the Toledot Adam v'Chavah of R. Jeroham, and a work called Shiṭṭot Meḳubbaẓot, a collection of glosses on various Talmudic tractates, are mentioned by David Conforte and Azulai. An anonymous rabbinical decision, edited by Abraham Palaggi in Abraham Azkir (Smyrna, 1889) and by Simon Bernfeld in Ḳobeẓ al Yad (published by the Meḳiẓe Nirdamim, Berlin, 1899), is attributed to him.

== Jewish Encyclopedia bibliography ==
- Azulai, Shem ha-Gedolim, s.v. Ḥayyim Benveniste;
- Benjacob, Otzar ha-Sefarim, Thesaurus Librorum Hebræorum tam Impressorum quam Manuscriptorum, Vilnius, 1880, pp. 167, 478, 523;
- David Conforte, Ḳore ha-Dorot, pp. 45b, 51b;
- Heinrich Grätz, Gesch. x.222;
- Ha-Shaḥar, 1872, p. 288;
- Moritz Steinschneider, Cat. Bodl.;
- Joseph Zedner, Cat. Hebr. Books Brit. Mus. s.v. and p. 408.
