= Abraham Miguel Cardoso =

Sabbatean prophet and physician (c. 1626–1706)

Abraham Miguel Cardozo (also Cardoso; c. 1626–1706) was a Sabbatean prophet and physician born in Rio Seco, Spain.

== Biography ==
A descendant of Conversos from around the city of Celorico da Beira in Portugal, he studied medicine at the University of Salamanca together with his older brother, Isaac Cardoso. While his brother Isaac focused on his academic studies, contemporary reports suggest that Miguel may have engaged more actively in social or cultural activities during this period. After having completed his education, he left Spain for Venice. There, probably at the instigation of his brother, he embraced Judaism and received the name "Abraham". Later, he established himself as a physician in Livorno but did not meet with much success until his recommendation by the Grand Duke of Tuscany to Osman Saqizli, the dey of Ottoman Tripolitania.

Becoming thereafter fairly prosperous, Cardoso married two wives and began to devote himself to Kabbalistic speculations, in which he appears to have been previously initiated at Livorno by Moses Pinheiro. With the appearance of the Sabbataean movement, he began to proclaim himself as a prophet, claiming to have had dreams and visions, and sent circulars to select locations to support the claimed messiahship of Sabbatai Zevi. Cardoso's belief that Zevi was the Jewish Messiah continued even when Zevi embraced Islam. Cardoso explained his strong belief in Zevi's messiahship by arguing that Zevi needed to be counted among the sinners in order to atone for Israel's sins. This interpretation aligns with a common messianic reading of the book of Isaiah, which bears similarities to the early Christian interpretation of the same text. Later, Cardoso referred to himself as "Messiah ben Ephraim," claiming that the Messiah reveals the true understanding of God. In nearly all of his writings, he elaborated on his understanding that the true God is not the En-Sof but the Keter 'Elyon (the first being a passive power without connection with the world).

Endowed with great eloquence, Cardoso had many followers but also many enemies. An influential personage, Isaac Lumbroso, by spending much money, obtained his banishment from Tripoli. Cardoso then traveled extensively while promoting his theological views, but his teachings were increasingly rejected by rabbinic authorities. In 1703, he settled at Cairo and became the physician of the pasha of Egypt. Three years later, in 1706, Cardoso was killed by his nephew during a personal dispute reportedly related to financial matters.

== Works ==
Cardoso was the author of many Kabbalistic and polemical works, of which only two are still extant:

- Boḳer Abraham (Dawn of Abraham), a Kabbalistic work in two volumes (Neubauer, Cat. Bodl. Hebr. MSS. No. 1441), an extract of which was published by Isaac Lopez in Kur Maẓref ha-Emunot,
- Ha-Ketab (The Writing), published in Weiss's Bet ha-Midrash, 1865.

Cardoso's other works were:

- Zeh Eli;
- Ḥokmato Shel Abraham Abinu
- Sefer ha-Ma'or
- Or Ẓaḥ we-Meẓuḳḳaḳ
- Wikkuaḥ Kellali
- Sullam Ya'aḳob
- Ḥereb Pipiyyot
- Elohe Abi
- Shema'Ḳaddishah
- Ṭob Adonai la-Kol
- Derush Amen
- Ereẓ Yisrael
- Sod Ḥai 'Alamin
- Derush ha-Ketab
- Solet Neḳiyyah
- Raza de-Razin

== See also ==
- Jewish Messiah claimants

== Jewish encyclopedia bibliography ==
- Heinrich Grätz, Gesch. der Juden, x.228, 229, 301;
- Kahana, Eben ha-To'im, pp. 53 et seq.;
- Moses Gaster, History of Bevis Marks, pp. 109 et seq.
