= Joseph Escapa =

Ottoman rabbi (c. 1572–1662)

Joseph Escapa (c. 1572–1662) served in the rabbinate of İzmir. He was probably born in Skopje, then a part of the Ottoman Empire, after which he is named.

== Biography ==
At first rabbi and chief of the yeshivah at Thessaloniki, he later filled the same offices at İzmir, where at the beginning he shared the rabbinate with Joshua Ashkenazi Azariah. When differences of opinion arose between them in regard to matters of ritual, they appealed to the rabbis of Thessaloniki for arbitration. After his colleague's death, Escapa remained sole rabbi of İzmir until the end of his life. David Conforte says he saw Escapa when the latter was about one hundred years old.

Escapa was known for having been the teacher of Ḥayyim Shabbethai and Shabbetai Tzvi, whom later he excommunicated. Escapa wrote an important work called Rosh Yosef, a detailed commentary and novellæ on the Arba'ah Turim of Rabbi Jacob ben Asher. Part one, which has been published, contains a portion of the Ṭur Oraḥ Ḥayyim (İzmir, 1658); part two, on Ḥoshen Mishpaṭ, has been published up to ch. 76 (İzmir, 1659). He also wrote responsa; some were published under the title of Teshubot Rosh Yosef (Frankfort-on-the-Oder, 1709).
