= Judah HeHasid =

People who used the name Judah HeHasid (Hebrew: יהודה החסיד, Yehudah HeHasid, "Judah the Pious") include:

- Judah ben Samuel of Regensburg (12th-13th centuries), the initiator of the Chassidei Ashkenaz movement
- Judah HeHasid (Jerusalem) (around 1650–1700), a charismatic preacher who led the largest organized group of Jewish immigrants to the Land of Israel before modern Zionism.
