= Solomon Nissim Algazi =

Israeli rabbi

- שלמה ניסים אלגאזי

Personal life
- Born: 1610
- Died: c. 1683
- Notable works: Yabin Shemu'ah; Halikot Eli; Gufe Halakot; Ahabat 'Olam; Hamon Rabbah; Zehab Sebah; Leḥem Setarim; Me'ullefet Sappirim; Raẓuf Ahabah / Apirion Shelomoh; Ta'awah la-'Enayim; Shema Shlomo
- Occupation: Rabbi

Religious life
- Religion: Judaism

Solomon Nissim Algazi (also: Shlomo Nissim Algazi; 1610 – c. 1683) was a prominent Sephardi rabbi, Talmudist, and author in the Ottoman Empire. He was recognized as one of the leading rabbinic authorities of his era and was active in Jewish communities in both Smyrna (modern-day İzmir) and Jerusalem during the 17th century.

== Early life and education ==
Algazi was born in 1610, likely in Bursa, into a distinguished rabbinic family; his grandfather was Joseph de Segovia Benveniste. He received his education from his father Abraham Algazi, the poet Joseph Ganso, and the well-known rabbi Meir de Boton, studying in their yeshiva in Gallipoli.

== Career ==
In 1635, Algazi settled in Jerusalem, later relocating to Smyrna in 1646, where he established a bet midrash (house of study) and played a central role in communal life. During his time in Smyrna, he became a leading religious authority and teacher, and among his pupils were his son-in-law Aaron Lapapa and Hayyim b. Menahem Algazi. During the crisis centered on the pseudo-Messiah Shabbetai Zvi, Algazi was actively involved in the opposition and took part in the excommunication of Shabbetai Zvi. After Zvi's apostasy, Algazi returned to Smyrna and resumed his leadership role in the community. Around 1670, he returned to Jerusalem and was appointed head of the local rabbinical court (Bet Din) by 1673, where he was highly respected for his scholarship and piety.

== Name ==
He added the name "Nissim" (Hebrew for "miracles") in gratitude after reportedly recovering from a life-threatening illness while traveling.

== Works ==
Algazi was a prolific author whose works focus primarily on Talmudic methodology, halakhic principles, and aggadic interpretation. Some of his most noted works include:

- Yabin Shemu'ah (Venice, 1639): A commentary on Halikot Olam by Yeshu'ah Ha-Levi and a supplement to Joseph Caro's Kelalei Ha-Talmud.
- Halikot Eli (Smyrna, 1663): Further methodological notes on Halikot Olam. Gufe Halakot (Smyrna, 1675): A systematic summation of halakhic principles.
- Ahabat Olam (Constantinople, 1642; Dyhernfurth, 1693): A collection of sermons.
- Hamon Rabbah (Constantinople, 1644): An index of scriptural passages cited in Midrash Rabbah.
- Zehab Sebah (Constantinople, 1683): A study of Talmudic aggadot.
- Leḥem Setarim (Venice, 1664): Talmudic novellae, especially on tractate Avodah Zarah.
- Me'ullefet Sappirim (Smyrna, 1665; Amsterdam, 1703): Selections from the Zohar.
- Raẓuf Ahabah (Smyrna, 1659; also published as Apirion Shelomoh, Amsterdam, 1710): Notes on Tosafot to aggadic passages in the Talmud.
- Ta'awah la-'Enayim (Salonika, 1655; Sulzbach, 1687): Notes on difficult aggadic passages, often referencing Jacob Ibn Habib's Ein Yaakov.
- Shema Shlomo (Smyrna, 1659; Amsterdam 1710): Miscellaneous teachings and commentaries.
- An additional work, Ziknat Shelomo, a commentary on the Ittur by Isaac ben Abba Mari, remains unpublished.

== Legacy ==
Algazi enjoyed lasting influence for his comprehensive method of Talmudic study, clarity of exposition, and leadership roles in major Ottoman Jewish centers. His works continue to be referenced in the study of Talmudic methodology.
