= Castellazzo family =

The Castellazzo family was an Italian-Jewish family who settled at the beginning of the sixteenth century in Cairo, where several members occupied the rabbinate with distinction. The most important family members were the following:

== Jehiel Castellazzo ==
Called Ashkenazi to signify that he was not by birth an Oriental, he was rabbi at Cairo in the sixteenth century. He was a contemporary of Yosef Karo, whom he severely criticized on account of a Halakha.

== Moses Castellazzo ==
He lived during the seventeenth century. He is eulogistically mentioned in the responsa of Meïr Boton.

== Moses dal Castellazzo ==
His name has been misread by copyists as Moses Kastilin.

He was a portrait-painter who lived at Venice in the fifteenth and sixteenth centuries. He is highly praised by David Reubeni in his memoirs for having befriended the latter on his arrival in Venice from Arabia in 1524. Moses's reputation as an artist extended far beyond the limits of the ghetto of Venice; indeed, he was known throughout Italy. In 1521, in recognition of his great talent, the Council of Venice granted him the privilege of selling his woodcut illustrations of the Pentateuch.

== Simeon ben Jehiel Castellazzo ==
He was rabbi at Cairo; died May, 1588. He was well versed in the Kabbalah, and was renowned for his great piety. David Conforte reports that he had seen a decision emanating from Joshua Soncin, rabbi of Constantinople at the time of Joseph Nasi, in which Soncin invokes the authority of Simeon ben Jehiel. Both Conforte and Joseph Sambari assert that Simeon wrote two works: (1) a collection of responsa, and (2) Megillot Setarim, a commentary, probably cabalistic, on the Book of Esther. Chaim Joseph David Azulai mentions as many as eighty responsa by Simeon.

== Moses ha-Kohen Abigdor Castellazzo ==
He was the son of Simeon (above) and was rabbi at Salonica, Rhodes, Damascus, and Cairo in the seventeenth century. In Cairo he was the colleague of Aaron ben Chayyim. He was almost ninety years old at his death.

== Bibliography ==
- Azulai, Chaim Joseph David, Shem ha-Gedolim, ed. Benjacob, i. 43
- Conforte, David, Qore ha-Dorot, ed. Cassel, p. 40
- Sambari, Joseph, in Neubauer, Anecdota Oxoniensia, i. 159
- Kaufmann, in Revue des Études Juives, xxiii. 139 et seq.
