= Nathan of Gaza =

Jewish theologian and author

- נתן העזתי
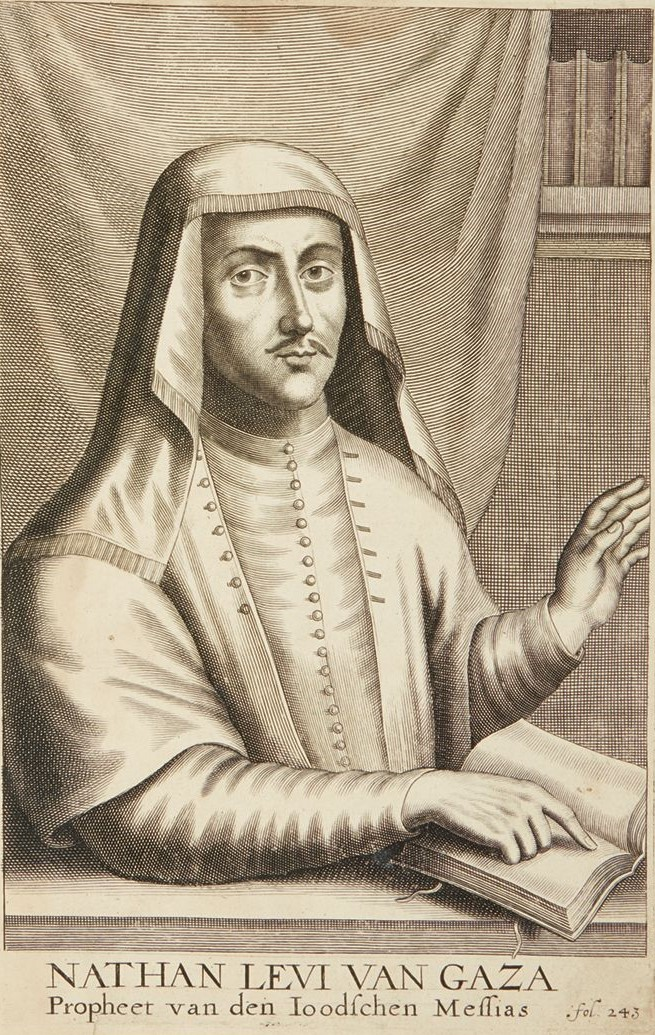
- Engraving from Cornelius Hazart's Kerckelycke Historie van de Gheheele Werelt, 1671

Personal life
- Born: 1643 Jerusalem, Ottoman Syria, Ottoman Empire
- Died: 1680 (aged 36–37) Sofia, Ottoman Empire

Religious life
- Religion: Sabbateanism

Nathan Benjamin ben Elisha Hayyim haLevi Ashkenazi (Hebrew: נתן בנימין בן אלישע חיים הלוי אשכנזי, romanized: Nāṯān Bīnyāmīn bēn ʾĔlîšāʿ Ḥayyīm hā-Levī ʾAškənazī), more famously known as Nathan of Gaza (Hebrew: נתן העזתי, romanized: Nāṯān hā-ʿAzzāṯī; 1643–1680), or Ghazzati, was a theologian and author born in Jerusalem. After his marriage in 1663 he moved to Gaza, where he became famous as a prophet for the Jewish messiah claimant Sabbatai Zevi.

== Biography ==
Nathan of Gaza was born in Jerusalem around 1643–1644; he died on Friday, January 11, 1680, in Sofia. He grew up in Jerusalem.

His father, Elisha Hayyim ben Jacob, was a distinguished rabbinic intellectual who served as an envoy of Jerusalem, collecting donations for impoverished Jews. During his travels, he would distribute kabbalistic works he obtained in Jerusalem. Upon settling in Ottoman Syria, Elisha Hayyim ben Jacob took on the surname "Ashkenazi" as a means of differentiating his family and himself from the largely Sephardic Jews of the Empire. He died in Alawid Morocco in 1673.

Before his father's death, Nathan of Gaza began studying Talmud and Kabbalah under Jacob Hagiz. The relationship between these two would continue for many years. Nathan of Gaza would spend most of his life, until about 1664, with his teacher at a yeshiva. During his studies, he wrote of his interest in and persistence toward a life as a Jewish academic. Gershom Scholem, a 20th-century scholar of Jewish mysticism, wrote that Nathan was "...an extremely gifted student, of quick apprehension and a brilliant intellect. His talents...[were] noteworthy for their rare combination of intellectual power and capacity for profound thinking with imagination and strong emotional sensitivity..." At 19 or 20, he married the daughter of an affluent Jew named Samuel Lissabona. The nuptials were believed to have occurred before the end of 1663 when he joined his wife's family in Gaza. There, he was able to focus considerably on his religious studies.

Nathan of Gaza initiated a focused study of Kabbalah after relocating to the area of Gaza. His exploration of Jewish mysticism led to various mystical experiences. An example of such experiences is noted in a letter written in 1673:

When I had attained the age of twenty, I began to study the book Zohar and some of the Lurianic writings. [According to the Talmud] he who wants to purify himself receives the aid of Heaven; and thus He sent me some of His holy angels and blessed spirits who revealed to me many of the mysteries of the Torah. In that same year, my force having been stimulated by the visions of the angels and the blessed souls, I was undergoing a prolonged fast in the week before the feast of Purim. Having locked myself in a separate room in holiness and purity...the spirit came over me, my hair stood on end and my knees shook and I beheld the merkabah, and I saw visions of God all day long and all night...

Nathan's vision lasted approximately 24 hours and is reported to have significantly influenced his perception of reality and self-identity. The event was described as overpowering and transformative, marking Nathan's conviction of being a true prophet for the time. Nathan purportedly experienced physical and mental changes, but a crucial aspect of his vision was his belief that Sabbatai Zevi was the Messiah. This conviction led to Nathan being acknowledged as the first Sabbatean believer, marking the beginning of the Sabbatean movement.

Nathan's prophecy regarding Sabbatai Zevi was not his only one. As the years went by, he experienced many other visions that would support his movement and strengthen the belief in Sabbatai Zevi. His second vision occurred on the evening of Shavuot in the spring of 1665. Nathan was said to have been spiritually possessed by a maggid, a celestial voice. (Maggid can also refer to an itinerant preacher). During the spiritual takeover, he was observed dancing energetically and emitting a distinct fragrance. The scent, mentioned in the Zohar, is thought to be linked to the aroma of the Garden of Eden, as well as to the prophet Elisha and Isaac Luria.

The vision described differs notably from Nathan of Gaza's prophetic awakening, yet it exhibits some similarities. One parallel is transformation. Following the end of the maggidic possession, Nathan of Gaza experienced a change, although this was not physical or mental. Instead, it involved how he was perceived by the Jewish community, which began to recognize him as a prophet and as a spiritual "doctor". This public recognition of Nathan of Gaza as a mystic and seer facilitated the subsequent acceptance of Sabbatai Zevi as a messianic figure. The use of prophecies was central to the movement, with numerous predictions made by Nathan of Gaza and Sabbatai Zevi contributing to the emergence of Sabbatean followers within the contemporary Jewish community.

Nathan of Gaza envisioned Sabbatai Zevi as the Messiah of the Jewish people, but Zevi's acceptance of his messianic role was not instantaneous. His first encounter with Nathan of Gaza was not about his position as the Jewish Messiah but rather as a patient to a physician. At the time, Nathan of Gaza was becoming well known as a "spiritual physician". Sabbatai Zevi visited him in hopes of curing him from an illness that he had contracted. (Scholem would later write that Zevi suffered from a psychological condition he identified as "manic-depressive psychosis", today called bipolar disorder.) Instead of trying to aid him with his psychological sickness, Nathan of Gaza divulged to Sabbatai Zevi his prophetic vision. Initially, when "Nathan addressed him as the messiah, 'he laughed at him and said, "I had it [the messianic vocation], but have sent it away."'" Intensive discussions led to Nathan of Gaza persuading Sabbatai Zevi to accept a messianic mission. In May 1665, Sabbatai Zevi publicly declared himself as the true savior, which positioned him and Nathan of Gaza prominently in the public eye.

In December 1665, Sabbatai Zevi and Nathan of Gaza parted ways. Sabbatai Zevi embarked on a journey to Turkey, where he would begin to advocate his newfound position as the Messiah. They would not see each other again until after Sabbatai Zevi's later conversion to Islam. Thus, from the fall of 1665 until the summer of 1666, the two worked arduously on the next stage of their movement: convincing the world that Sabbatai Zevi was the Messiah.

Seeing that the rabbis of Jerusalem were very hostile to the Sabbatean movement, Nathan proclaimed Gaza to be henceforth the "holy city". He first spread the word about the Messiah's fame by sending circulars from Ottoman Syria to the most important communities in Europe. Then, he visited several of the chief cities in Europe, Africa, and India and finally returned to Ottoman Syria. Even after Sabbatai Zevi's apostasy, Nathan did not desert his cause, but, thinking it unsafe to remain in Ottoman Syria any longer, he made preparations to go to Smyrna. Seeing that the credulous were confirmed anew in their belief, the rabbis excommunicated all the Sabbataeans, particularly Nathan (9 December 1666), warning everybody against harboring or even approaching him. After a stay of a few months at Smyrna, he went (at the end of April 1667) to Adrianople, where, despite his written promise that he would remain quiet, he continued his agitation. He urged the Sabbateans of Adrianople to proclaim their adhesion to the cause by abolishing the fasts of the 17th of Tammuz and the 9th of Ab.

== Travels through Europe ==
Again excommunicated at Adrianople, he went with a few followers to Thessaloniki. There he met with scant welcome, but had more success in the communities of Chios and Corfu. From Corfu he went to Venice (March, 1668), where the rabbinate and the council of the city compelled him to give them a written confession that all his prophecies were the production of his imagination. The confession was published, whereupon Abraham ha-Yakini, the originator of the Sabbatean movement, wrote Nathan a letter in which he sympathized with him over his persecution and expressed his indignation at the acts of the Venetian rabbinate.

The Venetian Jews then induced Nathan to set out for Livorno, where the Jewish population was known to be inimical to him. They sent an escort with him, ostensibly as a mark of honor, but in reality to prevent him from going elsewhere. He divined their motives in sending him to Livorno, however, and, succeeding in eluding his escort, proceeded to Rome. In spite of his disguise he was recognized there, and was banished from the city. He then went to Livorno voluntarily, and even there made converts to his cause. From Livorno he returned to Adrianople, and seems to have spent the remainder of his days in travel.

== Works ==
Nathan of Gaza persuaded the Jewish community through his writings about Sabbatai Zevi and Sabbateanism. He composed various letters and other written documents that promoted an entirely new kind of theology, one that merged the current notions of Kabbalah (of the time) with elements of Lurianic mysticism, a subject that he studied when he was younger. In addition to creating a "new type" of mysticism, he also composed a document entitled Derush ha-Tanninim "Discourse on the Dragons" (published by Scholem in be-Iqvot Mashiah, Jerusalem, 1944). This article stressed the notion of a "New Law" in which the old positive and negative commandments of the Torah were eliminated. This became the basis for what Gershom Scholem called "Sabbatean antinomianism".

Not only did Nathan of Gaza publish documents that advocated for a change and a removal of the Jewish laws and commandments, but he also composed various texts that discussed concepts entirely different from these unorthodoxies. For example, he wrote Hadrat Kodesh (Constantinople, 1735), a Kabbalistic commentary on the Book of Genesis, particularly on the aspect of creation. Several years later, Nathan of Gaza published Ozar Nehmad (Venice, 1738), a supplement to the Hadrat Qodesh. As evident from these alternative spiritual manuscripts, Nathan of Gaza was not solely a devout Sabbatean follower and believer; he strived to provide an alternative perspective and understanding of Judaism.

He also wrote Peri 'EtzHadar, prayers for Tu BiShvat (ib. 1753), and Tiqqun Qeri'ah, an ascetic work according to Sabbatean doctrines (Amsterdam, 1666). His travels were translated into German by Moritz Horschetzky and published in Orient, Lit. ix. 170–172, 299–301.

Overall, the documents Nathan of Gaza produced and presented were both positively and negatively received by the Jewish community. For example, some of the rabbis in Jerusalem were divided over the ideas Nathan of Gaza wrote. A number of them felt that these written records were sacrilegious; they defied the basic tenets of the Jewish faith. Nevertheless, the composition of these texts provided a further platform in which Sabbatai Zevi and Nathan of Gaza could promote their Sabbatean ideologies.

== Death ==
There is some consensus among sources that on Friday, January 11, 1680, in Üsküp, Ottoman Empire (now Skopje, North Macedonia), Nathan of Gaza died. However, according to other sources, he died in Sofia (now in Bulgaria), but his body was transferred to Üsküp and buried there. According to the Jewish physician, Jacques Konfino, who visited Skopje in the 1930s, Nathan of Gaza was buried in a marble tomb along with a disciple. According to Konfino the tomb was engraved in Hebrew with this inscription:

The eternal home of all living beings, the monument of rest of the Lord’s servant, awakens and dedicates heavenly glory to him. I did not sing his praises extensively because to him belong tranquility and glory, our revered teacher and rabbi, Abraham Benjamin Nathan Ashkenazi, may he rest in paradise, who was invited into the celestial yeshiva on Tuesday the sixteenth of the month of Shevat, in the year of 5440, may his soul be bound in the bundle of life

His burial place became a pilgrimage site after his death. Many Jews believed that Nathan's grave had supernatural qualities. In one legend told by Rabbi Haim Palachi, Shabbetai Ventura was punished with swelling in his hands and a rash after refusing to honor the grave during a visit to the Skopje cemetery. According to the legend, this illness was miraculously healed after he returned to the grave and vowed to pray for Nathan of Gaza's soul. The tomb survived only until World War II, when it was destroyed.
