= Abraham Yachini =

Hebrew author

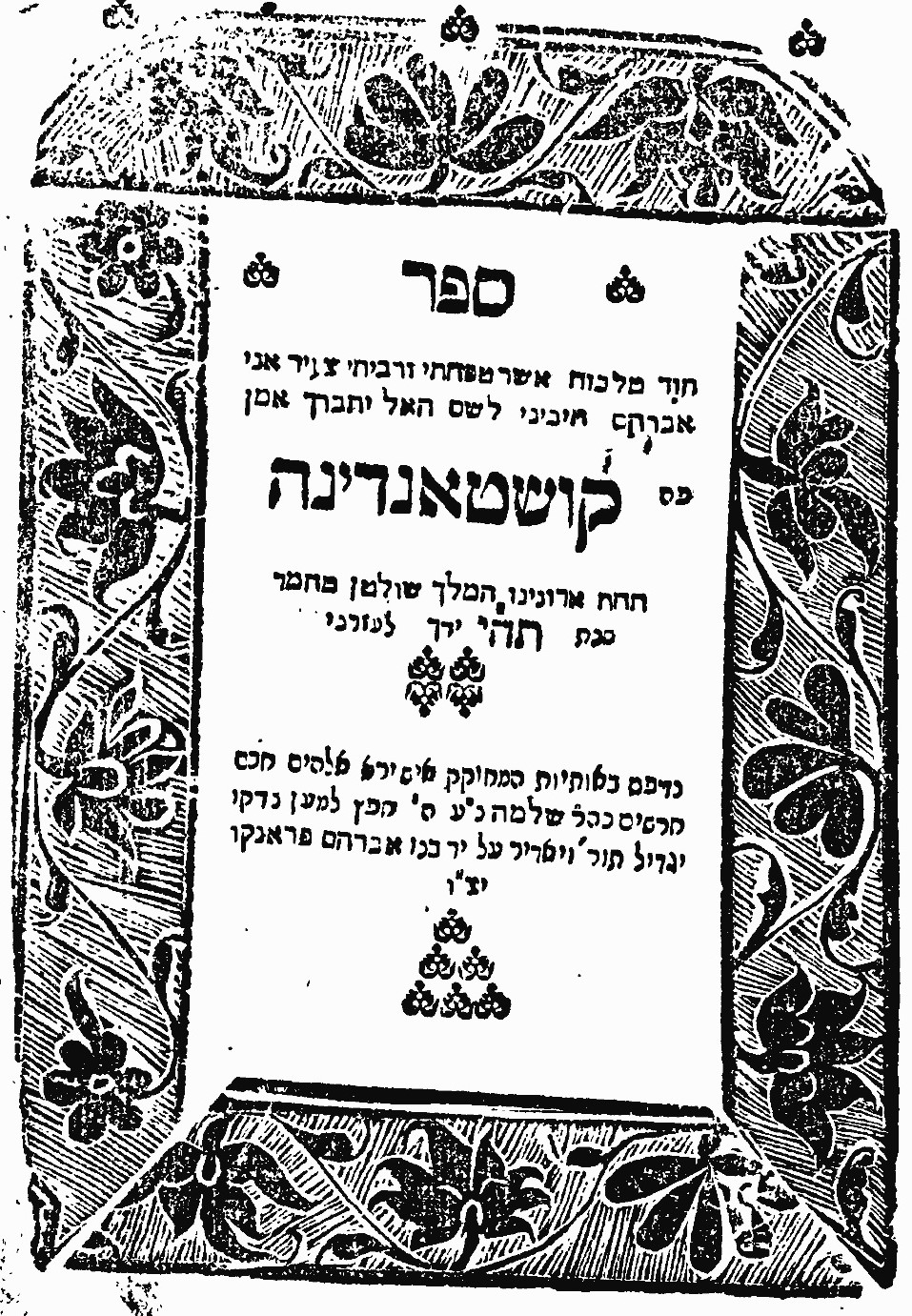
Front page of Sefer Hod Malkuth written by Yachini.

Abraham Yakhini (Hebrew: אברהם יכיני; also transliterated as Abraham Yachini, or Abraham ha-Yakini; 1611-1682) was one of the chief agitators in the Sabbatean movement, the son of Pethahiah of Constantinople.

== Life ==
He studied under Joseph Trani of Constantinople (died 1644), and under Mordecai, a German kabbalist. From the latter, he probably derived the touch of mysticism, which, combined with cunning and great intelligence, made him the most suitable representative of Sabbatai Zevi. Yakhini persuaded Sabbatai Zevi, who at that time was convinced that he was the Messiah, but was timid and fearful of proclaiming himself, boldly to declare his claims. In Constantinople, about 1653, Sabbatai Zevi became acquainted with Yakhini, who, on account of his learning and oratorical powers, enjoyed an excellent reputation in his native town. He is described by contemporaries as the best preacher of his day.

Some say that Yakhini had put into the hands of Sabbatai Zevi a spurious book in archaic characters, which, he assured him, contained the scriptural proof of his Messianic origin. This fabrication, entitled The Great Wisdom of Solomon, began as follows:

I, Abraham, was confined in a cave for forty years, and I wondered greatly that the time of miracles did not arrive. Then was heard a voice, proclaiming, "A son will be born in the year 5386 [1626] to Mordecai Ẓebi and he will be called Sabbatai. He will humble the great dragon... he, the true Messiah, will sit upon My [God's] throne."

In this manner and a style imitating the ancient apocalypses, this fabrication, attributed by some scholars to Yakhini, who was a master of Hebrew diction, continues to describe the vision which had appeared to the fictitious Abraham. (Other scholars attribute the letter to Nathan of Gaza.) Sabbatai Zevi accepted this work as an actual revelation and determined to go to Thessaloniki—the paradise of kabbalists—and began his public activity there. Zevi was not ungrateful and later appointed Yachini among the kings he chose to enthrone over his prospective worldwide empire.

Yakhini, on his side, proved himself not unworthy of the confidence shown by his master. He gave proof of his devotion at the time when Sabbatai Zevi was in prison in Constantinople, and when even the most significant enthusiast could no longer be in doubt concerning his true character. He forged official opinions of the rabbinical council of Constantinople in favor of Sabbatai's claims to Messiahship. With great subtlety, he obtained influence over two Polish rabbis who, as delegates of the Jews of Eastern Europe, had come to Constantinople to investigate the claims of Sabbatai and exercised such influence over them as to lead them to declare themselves his adherents. Sabbatai's conversion to Islam put an end to the career of Yakhini as an agitator.

== Works ==
Notwithstanding his activity in this direction, he found time for literary work, which is of such merit that, had it not been for the deceptions he practised, it would have secured him an honorable place among the Jewish scholars of his time. He is the author of one hundred and fifty psalms (composed in imitation of those in the Bible), which appeared under the title Hod Malkut (Glory of the Kingdom), Constantinople, 1655. He also wrote Eshel Abraham (Abraham's Oak), a collection of sermons, and Tosefet Merubbah (Additions to Additions), a commentary upon the Tosefta, and responsa. At the request of the Dutch scholar and bibliophile Levinus Warner, whom he knew personally and for whom he copied many Karaite Jewish manuscripts, he composed a work on the genealogy of the patriarch Abraham, which is still preserved in the Warner collection at Leiden. From a Hebrew letter of Yakhini to Warner, it is learned that the former favoured the Dutch minister at the Ottoman court, and it must be stated to the credit of Yakhini that he used his influence on behalf of strangers.

Among the Krymchaks, the Jews of Crimea, Yakhini is still a name to conjure with. At their prayers in memory of Israel's great dead, his name is mentioned with special solemnity.

== Jewish Encyclopedia bibliography ==
- Moritz Steinschneider, Cat. Bodl. No. 4240;
- idem, Leyden Catalogue, p. 290;
- Julius Fürst, Gesch. d. Karäert. iii. 53;
- Anmerkungen, p. 92;
- Heinrich Grätz, Gesch. d. Juden, 3d ed., x. 191, 211, 217;
- D. Kahana, Eben ha-To'im, pp. 6, 29, 37;
- Azulai, Shem ha-Gedolim he-Ḥadash, letter Aleph, No. 58;
- Deinard, Massa Krim, ii. 159.
