= Lior Zoref =

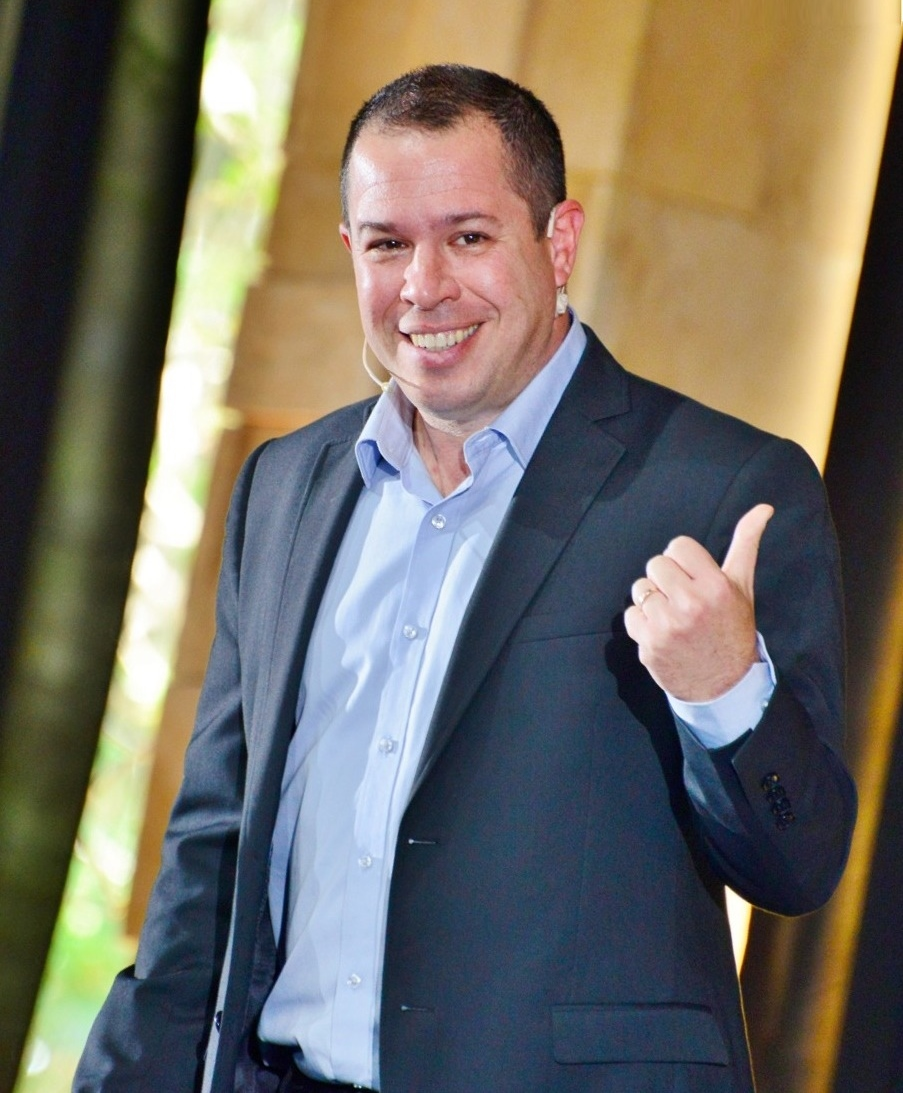
- Born: 1970 (age 55–56)

Lior Zoref (born 1970) is an Israeli researcher, author and keynote speaker whose work focuses on collective intelligence and crowdsourcing. He is the author of the 2015 book Mindsharing: The Art of Crowdsourcing Everything, and at the 2012 TED conference he delivered a presentation — developed with input from his social-media network — that has been described as the first crowdsourced TED talk, during which he brought a live ox onto the stage to demonstrate the wisdom of crowds.

== Early life and education ==
Zoref studied at the Technion. He later completed doctoral studies at Bar-Ilan University, where his research examined the use of social networks and collective intelligence in decision-making and career guidance.

== Career ==
From 1996 to 2010, Zoref worked at Microsoft, where his final position was vice president of marketing for the company's consumer and online services division. He left the company in 2010 to pursue doctoral research and to work as a researcher, author and speaker on collective intelligence. He has also taught crowdsourcing and digital marketing to business students. As a keynote speaker, Zoref addresses collective intelligence, innovation and decision-making in the context of artificial and collective intelligence. He has been profiled in the press, and in 2012 the Israeli news site "mako" included him in its annual list of the most interesting people of the year.

== TED talk ==
At the 2012 TED conference in Long Beach, California, Zoref gave a talk on the wisdom of crowds that he developed with the help of his online network, which TED described as the first crowdsourced TED talk. During the talk he brought a live ox onto the stage and asked the audience to estimate its weight in real time; the average of the submitted guesses was within a few pounds of the animal's actual weight of about 1,795 pounds, illustrating the wisdom-of-crowds effect. The talk was also mentioned in The New Yorker.

== Mindsharing ==
Zoref's book Mindsharing: The Art of Crowdsourcing Everything was published in 2015 by Portfolio, an imprint of Penguin. It argues that individuals and organizations can make better decisions by drawing on the knowledge of their social networks. The book was translated into several languages, including Chinese, Korean and Hebrew. It was reviewed by Kirkus Reviews and Library Journal, and was included in a 2016 Inc. magazine list of recommended books for entrepreneurs.

== Research and other work ==
Zoref's research on collective intelligence has been published in peer-reviewed journals; a 2020 study he co-authored with David Passig in Interactive Learning Environments examined the use of social networks as a collective-intelligence tool for decision-making about adult lifelong education. He has discussed his work in interviews, including on the public-radio program Tech Nation

Zoref is also the founder and chief executive of Yesh Matsav, a nonprofit organization that works with at-risk youth through lectures and personal-coaching programs founded in 2022.
