= Samuel Primo =

Sabbatean sectarian

- Born: c. 1635; Jerusalem, Ottoman Empire
- Died: 1708; Adrianople, Ottoman Empire
- Occupation(s): Sabbatean sectarian, private secretary to Sabbatai Zevi
- Known for: Early follower of Sabbatai Zevi and promoter of the Sabbatean movement

Samuel Primo (c. 1635 in Jerusalem – 1708 in Adrianople), was a prominent Sabbatean sectarian of the 17th century.

Primo was one of the earliest followers of Sabbatai Zevi, the self-proclaimed Jewish messiah. Primo became Zevi's private secretary on Zevi's journey from Jerusalem to Smyrna in 1665, cleverly managing to give the advent of the pseudo-Messiah an air of dignity. From Smyrna, Primo spread the news among foreign Jews that the Messiah had actually appeared. With certain of his confidants he was the first to plan the abolition of rabbinic Judaism. In the name of Zevi, Primo sent a circular to the Jews (December 1665) advising the abolition of the fast-day Tisha B'Av from the Hebrew calendar.

In February, 1666, Primo accompanied Zevi to Constantinople. After Zevi converted to Islam, Primo explained this apparent apostasy as having been foreordained in the Messianic role. Concerning the rest of his life not much is known.

== Jewish Encyclopedia bibliography ==
- Hottinger, Thesaurus. xxx. 287–361, Zurich, 1649
- Weiss, in Bet ha-Midrash, 1868, pp. 64, 100;
- Grätz, Gesch. 3d ed., x. 199 et seq. and note 3.
