= Frankists =

Frankists may refer to:

- Frankists (Judaism), a Sabbatean sect of the 18th and 19th centuries, followers of Jacob Frank
- Frankists (Croatia), a Croatian political grouping of the 20th century, followers of Josip Frank
