= Moritz Horschetzky =

- Born: 1777 or 1788; Bydzov, Bohemia
- Died: 7 November 1859; Nagykanizsa, Hungary
- Occupation: Physician
- Spouse: Julia Lackenbacher
- Writing career
- Language: German

Moritz Horschetzky (1777 or 1788 – 7 November 1859) was an Austrian medical doctor, writer, and translator.

He was born to a Jewish family in Bydzov, Bohemia, in 1777 or 1788. He received a traditional early education, attended the Israelitische Hauptschule in Prague, and later acquired a doctorate in medicine in Vienna.

Horschetzky married into the prominent Lackenbacher family; his father-in-law Hirsch Lackenbacher was leader of the Jewish community of Nagykanizsa, Hungary, where Horschetzky began practising medicine in 1811. He went on to run the town's Jewish hospital and serve as director of the Jewish community school. He became a member of the Royal Hungarian Academy of Sciences in 1845.

As a writer he devoted himself chiefly to the works of Josephus, whose Antiquities he translated and in part annotated (1826, 1843, 1851). He also wrote for the journals Allgemeine Zeitung des Judenthums, the Orient, and Ben-Chananja. He possessed remarkable humor, which appears in his fictitious Reiseberichte Nathan Ghazzati's (1848), which Julius Fürst took to be a translation from Hebrew.

He died in Nagykanizsa on 7 November 1859.

== Bibliography ==
- Geschichte der Juden seit dem Rückzuge aus der babylonischen Gefangenschaft, bis zur Schlacht bei Aza in welcher Judas der Maccabäer fiel. Antiquitates Judaicae.German. (in German). Prague: M. I. Landau. 1826. hdl:2027/hvd.hw5hia.
- Dreizehntes Buch der jüdischen Antiquitäten des Flavius Josephus (in German). Nagykanizsa. 1843.
- "Reiseberichte des Natan Ghazzati". Orient. Lit. (in German). 9: 170–172, 299–301.
