= Baruchiah Russo =

Sabbatean leader of the Karakas community

Baruchiah Russo (1677–1720) also known as Osman Baba, Signor Santo, Osman Nuri Efendi and Osman Bevvap, was a Sabbatean leader of the Karakas sabbatean community and a successor to Sabbatai Zevi.

== Early life ==
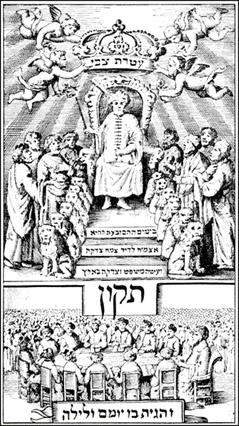
Sabbatai Zevi crowned as the messiah in 1666, the bottom reads "Tikkun" in Hebrew.

Baruchiah was born nine months after the death of Sabbatai Zevi and was believed to be the carrier of the Sabbatai's messianic soul by sabbatean believers in the process of kabbalistic reincarnation or Gilgul. His parents, Abdurrahman Efendi (Senyor Nagid Sultan) and Rachel Alta Sultan, were ordinary Sabbatean believers. Some authors such as Ohad Pele Ezrahi, claimed that Baruchiah was conceived during the Sabbatean festival of 22 Adar, also known as festival of the lamb, and that is why he was destined to be prophetic leader of the sabbatean community.

Baruchiah was educated in sabbateanism by Mustafa Celebi (Shlomo ben Yosef).

== As Sabbatean leader ==
After Sabbatai Zevi's death his followers were divided into three groups: Yakubi, Kapancı and Karakaş. Yakub Celebi's group became known as the Yakubis which adopted most Sunni Islamic practices outwardly. Yakub Celebi passed away returning from Hajj in 1690 and his group did not attract many sabbatean believers. the Karakaş practiced the most radical form of sabbatean antinomianism and was the most missionary among the three groups. They also had close relationships with the Bektasi Sufi order and Sabbatai Zevi himself was reported to participate in dhikr circles with the Bektasis in their lodge in Edirne.

When the second coming of Sabbatai did not occur as expected, Mustafa Celebi proclaimed Baruchiah (Osman Baba) as messiah in 1716, at his 40th birthday.

The Karakash community accepted Russo as their new divine leader carrying the soul of Sabbatai Zevi. According to Karakash tradition, Baruchiah Russo known as Osman Baba after his conversion to Islam, began to perform miracles as a child, bringing blessings wherever he went. At the age of 26, he demonstrated specific miracles witnessed by his close followers, who began to consider him the true expected one. He was deified and seen as the Signor Santo who was the reflection of the God of Israel dwelling in Tiferet, while Sabbatai was seen as the reflection of Shekhina the Sephirot universe,

However, Osman baba's opponents accused him of being a dull witted man who was used by other donme leaders. He was tall, dark, fat and unimpressive in the eyes of many.

Osman baba's sect was called "On Yollular" meaning the men of ten paths, based on their radical sexual antinomianism. Gershom Scholem argues that his opponents believed the group wanted to bring many paths from different religions into one. The group actively sent missionaries to Poland, Germany and Austria, bringing the good news of the appearance of the new messiah. Later these emissaries reached Jacob Frank and influenced him in following the sabbatean path.

Over time the radical antinomianism especially Osman Baba's attitude towards women began to make some maaminim (Hebrew for believers) believe that he was not the messiah after all. Another dissident group was not satisfied that Osman Baba proclaimed to be Sabbatai Zevi himself. However his messiahship lasted a few more years until his sudden death at 1720 at the age of 44. Many believers insisted that the messiah has risen which eventually resulted in opening of the grave and finding Osman Baba's rotting corpse to their dismay.

After Osman Baba's death complained were filed to Ottoman authorities that the donmeh are neither Muslim nor Jewish. Hasan Pasha was set to crush them in 1722, but his sudden death was translated as divine intervention by the sabbateans.

== Theology ==
Baruchiah Russo took Lurianic Kabbalah theory of Shevirat HaKeilim (The Breaking of the Vessels) to its ultimate conclusion. According to Luria, holy sparks fell into the darkness (Kelipot) when the vessels shattered. Russo argued that to rescue these sparks, one must descend into the "deepest depths of darkness." •

=== Tikkun B'Aveira (Redemption Through Sin) ===
According to this concept, actions that appear "sinful" or "illegal" from the outside (such as breaking religious laws) are actually mystical missions performed to release the holy sparks. In his teaching, the Partzufim are not merely celestial mechanisms but divine realities embodied on earth. In Karakaş prayers, the most significant departure from traditional Jewish liturgy is found in the forms of address. Instead of using "Adonai" for God, Ladino texts frequently use "Signor Santo" (Holy Lord) or "Il Dyo de Israel" (The God of Israel).

== Personal life ==
Osman Baba married twice from which he had three sons and four daughters. His son Abdurrahman Efendi (died 1781) succeeded him. Osman Baba's house, Casa Santo, where his tomb is also located, became a place of veneration for his followers. According to tradition, an empty bed and green light are kept in his believers’ homes for his, eventual return. Legend has it that Osman Baba's mummy was brought to Turkey in the 1910s and entombed in the Dönme cemetery in Bülbülderesi, next to one of his sons' graves.

== See also ==
- Donmeh
- Sabbatai Zevi
- Jacob Frank
- Lurianic Kabbalah
- Bektashism
