= Joshua Heschel Zoref =

Joshua Heschel Zoref (1633–1700) was a 17th-century Rabbi, Kabbalist and an important figure in the Lithuanian Sabbatean movement. He is known for writing the kabblistic book Sefer Ha-Tzoref. During the messianic fervor of 1666, he claimed to experience visions similar to those of Ezekiel. He, like Judah Leib Prossnitz also, considered himself to be possessed of the role of Messiah ben Joseph, with Shabbatai Tzvi playing the role of Messiah ben David.

== Early Life ==
Zoref was born in Vilna in 1633. He was a silversmith with little to modest jewish formal education. His last name Zoref both referred to his occupation as a goldsmith and to kabalistic practice of exchanging the letters ("tzeruf otiyot"). According to tradition, Rabbi Heschel Zoref led an ascetic and reclusive life, rarely leaving his home; he claimed to be imbued with the spirit of prophecy and to behold divine visions. Heschel Zoref’s influence extended well beyond his immediate circle. He corresponded with numerous Sabbatean figures regarding theological issues and maintained ties with members of the study circle of Rabbi Judah he-Hasid of Jerusalem—a group suspected of Sabbatean leanings.

In the month of Tammuz, 5415 (1655), he was forced into exile from the city along with most of the Jews of Vilna due to the upheavals, and relocated to Amsterdam; it was during this period that he began studying Kabbalah. Once the hostilities ceased, Rabbi Heschel returned to Vilna alongside Rabbi Moshe Rivkes and immersed himself in Kabbalistic writings.

During the messianic upheaval surrounding Shabbatai Tzvi in 1666, Zoref began experiencing visionary revelations that were compared by contemporaries to those of the prophet Ezekiel. He became a leading Sabbatean spokesman in Vilna and developed a circle of followers who regarded him as a prophetic authority. He was in contact with Sabbateans in Italy and the Ottoman empire. After the death of Shabbatai Tzvi he put forward a claim that he was the messiah ben joseph, paving the way for the second coming of Shabbatai Tzvi.

Zoref subsequently recorded his revelations in a massive mystical work known as Sefer ha-Tzoref, originally organized into five sections corresponding to the Five Books of Moses. His writings employed extensive gematria and Kabbalistic interpretation, particularly around the Shema Yisrael, and he ultimately understood himself in the role of Messiah ben Joseph, with Shabbetai Zevi occupying the role of Messiah ben David. Much of Sefer ha-Zoref was lost, although substantial manuscript material survived and later circulated among Hasidic figures; Gershom Scholem famously identified Zoref with the legendary “Adam Ba'al Shem,” though this identification was subsequently challenged by scholars.

His writings were never printed, a fact that severely limited his influence after his passing. An autograph manuscript of a portion of *Sefer HaTzoref*, housed at the National and University Library in Jerusalem, comprises nearly three hundred pages densely written on both sides.

In 1941 (5701), Ze'ev Rabinovich published a text from a manuscript found in the archives of Joseph Perl—a Galician *Maskil*—indicating that Rabbi Yisrael Baal Shem Tov, the founder of the Hasidic movement, admired the book *Sefer HaTzoref* and would often say that through this book, one could build worlds. The scholar Gershom Scholem identified the writings of Rabbi Heschel—which were in the possession of the Baal Shem Tov—with the writings the Baal Shem Tov had received from Rabbi Adam Baal Shem; Scholem argued that the name of the author, Rabbi Heschel, was deliberately concealed, transforming the entire matter from a historical fact into a miraculous legend. However, scholars Rabbi Yitzhak Alfasi and Rabbi Yehoshua Mondshine strongly dispute this, questioning both the authenticity of the documents published by Rabinovich and the validity of Scholem’s hypothesis, which is fraught with inconsistencies and puzzling aspects. Furthermore, Rabbi Mondshine argues that Rabbi Heschel Tzoref was widely accepted throughout the Jewish Diaspora and is cited with admiration in works by authors who fought against Sabbateanism, as well as within Hasidic circles; consequently, there would have been no reason to conceal the author's identity, and had Rabbi Heschel Tzoref been the author, it would have been acknowledged. Scholars Emmanuel Etkes and David Assaf share the view held by Rabbi Yehoshua Mondshine on this matter.

Towards the end of his life, Rabbi Heschel married the daughter of Jacob Eleazar Fischhof who was a prominent member of the group led by Rabbi Judah HeChasid and Rabbi Chaim Malach. Although he participated in the preparations to immigrate to the Land of Israel with the group, the journey itself did not come to pass; he passed away in Kraków around 1700.

In 1733 (5493), the Hebraist Johann Christoph Wolf published the text of his tombstone inscription—listing him among those buried in Kraków—in the fourth volume of his work *Bibliotheca Hebræa* (p. 1206).
