= David Conforte =

17th-century Ottoman rabbi and literary historian

- דוד קונפורטי

Personal life
- Born: c. 1618 Salonica, Ottoman Empire
- Died: c. 1685
- Notable work: Ḳore ha-Dorot
- Occupation: Literary historian, Rabbi, Dayan

Religious life
- Religion: Judaism

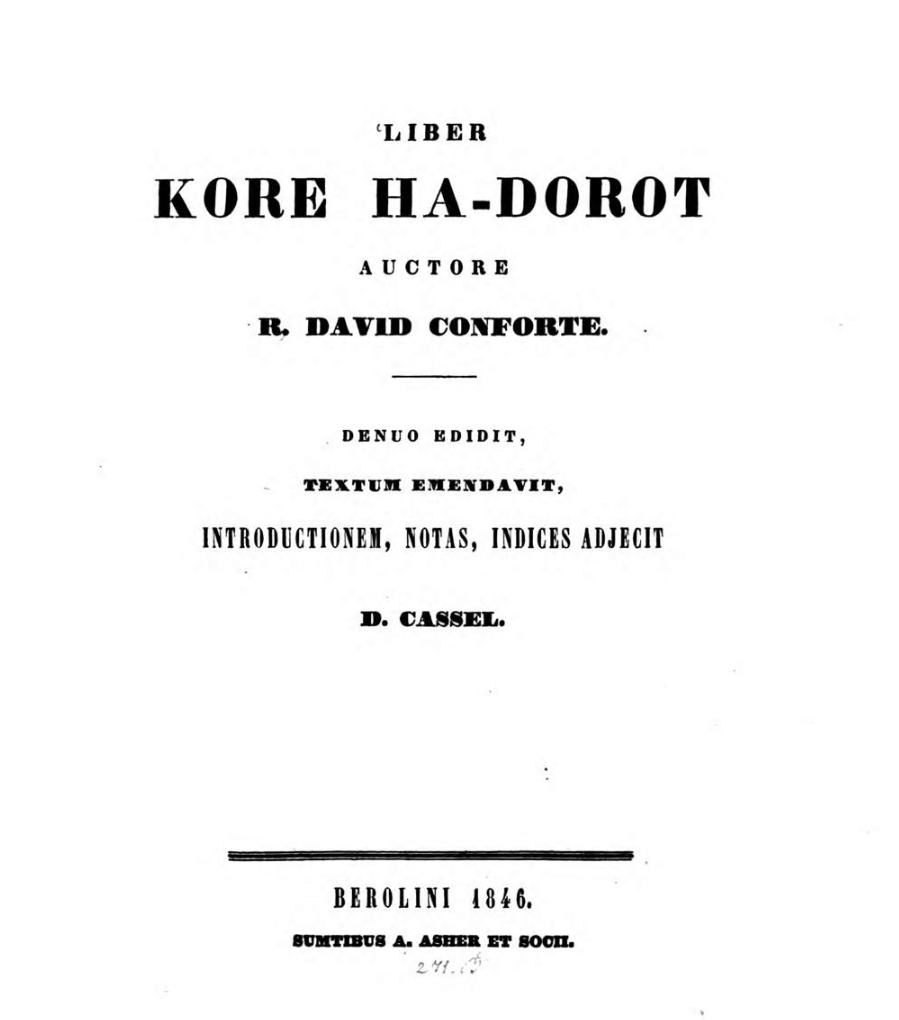
1846 printing of Kore ha-Dorot

David Conforte (c. 1618 – c. 1685) (Hebrew: דוד קונפורטי) was a Hebrew literary historian born in Salonica, author of the literary chronicle known by the title Ḳore ha-Dorot. Conforte was a compiler of Jewish bibliographic material whose chronicle contains information on Sephardic rabbis from the Ottoman Empire and Italy in the 16th and 17th centuries, and relies on the rabbinic chain of tradition via Zacuto, Daud, and Yahya as well as responsa literature.

== Biography ==
Conforte came of a family of scholars. His early instructors were rabbis Hayyim Shabbethai, Israel Ze'evi, Judah Girasi and Baruch Angel. As a young man, he studied the Kabbala under R. Jefeth the Egyptian, and philosophy under R. Levi Pasriel. His chief teachers, however, were Mordecai Kalai and Daniel Estroza. Conforte married a granddaughter of Menahem Lonzano. He journeyed twice to the Land of Israel (then part of Ottoman Syria), once in 1644, alone, and a second time in 1652, when, together with his family, he settled in Jerusalem, founding there a study hall. In 1671, however, he was in Egypt, where he occupied the position of dayan. He is also known to have been in Smyrna.

== Kore ha-Dorot ==
Conforte's chief work is a literary chronicle now known by the title Ḳore ha-Dorot, which contains the names of all the teachers and writers from the close of the Talmud up to his own day. This chronicle is divided into three parts, the first two of which, referring to the time before the expulsion of the Jews from Spain in 1492, are very short. The third part is divided into eleven generations, and is not systematically arranged. Conforte used all the earlier historical works, such as Abraham ibn Daud's Sefer ha-Ḳabbalah, Zacuto's Yuḥasin, and Yahyah's Shalshelet ha-Ḳabbalah, especially the first mentioned, from which he cites whole passages. He also gathered material from various printed and manuscript responsa, and was the first to collect the names mentioned in these works. His chronicle is valuable for the literary history of the Jews in the sixteenth and seventeenth centuries, especially in Turkey, Italy, Africa, and the near East. It was probably composed in Egypt, about the year 1683, if Cassel's conjecture is correct. Conforte was a mere compiler, and at times his data are contradictory. The original manuscript was brought from Egypt by R. David Ashkenazi of Jerusalem, who, to judge from a note in his preface, gave it the title Ḳore ha-Dorot, and had it printed in Venice in 1746, without mentioning the name of the author. This poor edition has been critically reedited, and supplied with notes and index, by David Cassel (Berlin, 1846), who follows the pagination of the first edition. Conforte also wrote a volume of responsa, the fate of which, however, is unknown.

It was reprinted in Warsaw in 1838 with an introduction by Jost, and by Cassel in 1846. This work contains historical information on extant yeshivot of the Jewish diaspora. According to Bonfil, likely motivated by the failure of Sabbateanism, the work explores the history of the Jewish people without mentioning that messianic movement. His work was also cited by Azulai.

Gabriel Conforto, a Turkish Talmudist who is mentioned in the responsa literature of the seventeenth century, was probably a son of David Conforte.
