= Sabbateans =

Followers of Sabbatai Zevi

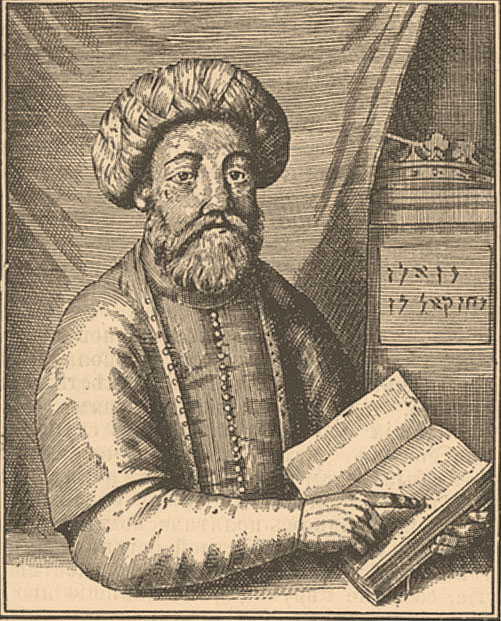
Illustration of Sabbatai Zevi from 1906 (Joods Historisch Museum)

The Sabbateans (or Sabbatians) are a variety of Jewish followers, disciples, and believers in Sabbatai Zevi (1626–1676), an Ottoman Jewish rabbi and Kabbalist who was proclaimed to be the Jewish Messiah in 1666 by Nathan of Gaza.

Vast numbers of Jews in the Jewish diaspora accepted his claims, even after he outwardly became an apostate due to his forced conversion to Islam in the same year. Sabbatai Zevi's followers, both during his proclaimed messiahship and after his forced conversion to Islam, are known as Sabbateans.

In the late 17th century, northern Italy experienced a surge of Sabbatean activity, driven by the missionary efforts of Abraham Miguel Cardoso. Around 1700, a radical faction within the Dönmeh movement, led by Baruchiah Russo, emerged, which sought to abolish many biblical prohibitions. During the same period, Sabbatean groups from Poland migrated to Palestine. The Sabbatean movement continued to disseminate throughout central Europe and northern Italy during the 18th century, propelled by "prophets" and "believers". Concurrently, anti-Sabbatean literature emerged, leading to a notable dispute between Rabbi Jacob Emden (Ya'avetz) and Jonathan Eybeschuetz. Additionally, a successor movement known as Frankism, led by Jacob Frank, began in Eastern Europe during this century. Part of the Sabbateans lived on until well into 21st-century Turkey as descendants of the Dönmeh.

== Sabbatai Zevi ==
Sabbatai Zevi was a Sephardic ordained rabbi from Smyrna (now İzmir, Turkey). A kabbalist of Romaniote origin, Zevi, who was active throughout the Ottoman Empire, claimed to be the long-awaited Jewish Messiah. He was the founder of the Sabbatean movement, whose followers subsequently were to be known as Dönmeh "converts" or crypto-Jews.

== Conversion to Islam ==
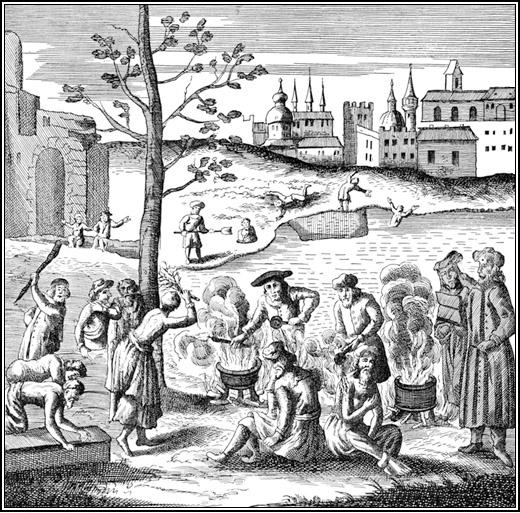
Former followers of Sabbatai do penance for their support of him.

In February 1666, upon arriving in Constantinople, Sabbatai was imprisoned on the order of the grand vizier Köprülüzade Fazıl Ahmed Pasha; in September of that same year, after being moved from different prisons around the capital to Adrianople (the imperial court's seat) for judgment on accusations of fomenting sedition, Sabbatai was given by the Grand Vizier, in the name of the Sultan of the Ottoman Empire, Mehmed IV, the choice of either facing death by some type of ordeal, or of converting to Islam. Sabbatai seems to have chosen the latter by donning from then on a turban. He was then also rewarded by the heads of the Ottoman state with a generous pension for his compliance with their political and religious plans.

Sabbatai's conversion to Islam was extremely disheartening for the world's Jewish communities. In addition to the misery and disappointment from within, Muslims and Christians jeered at and scorned the Jews.

In spite of Sabbatai's apostasy, many of his adherents still tenaciously clung to him, claiming that his conversion was a part of the Messianic scheme. This belief was further upheld and strengthened by the likes of Nathan of Gaza and Samuel Primo, who were interested in maintaining the movement.

Many within Zevi's inner circle followed him into Islam, including his wife Sarah and most of his closest relatives and friends. Nathan of Gaza, the scholar closest to Zevi, who had caused Zevi to reveal his Messiahship and in turn became his prophet, never followed his master into Islam but remained a Jew, albeit excommunicated by his Jewish brethren.

After Sabbatai Zevi's apostasy, many Jews, although horrified, clung to the belief that Zevi could still be regarded as the true Jewish Messiah. They constituted the largest number of Sabbateans during the 17th and 18th centuries. By the 19th century, Jewish Sabbateans had been reduced to small groups of hidden followers who feared being discovered for their beliefs, that were deemed to be entirely heretical and antithetical to Rabbinic Judaism. These very Jews fell under the category of "sectarian" Sabbateans, which originated when many Sabbateans refused to accept that Zevi's feigned apostasy might have been indicative of the fact that their faith was genuinely an illusion.

Another large group of Sabbateans after Zevi's apostasy began to view Islam in an extremely negative light. Polemics against Islam erupted directly after Zevi's forced conversion. Some of these attacks were considered part of a largely anti-Sabbatean agenda. Accusations coming from anti-Sabbatean Jews revolved around the idea that Sabbatai Zevi's feigned conversion to Islam was rightfully an indicator of a false claim of Messianship.

Inside the Ottoman Empire, those followers of Zevi who had converted to Islam but who secretly continued Jewish observances and brit milah became known as the Dönmeh (Turkish: dönme "convert"). There were some internal sub-divisions within the sect, according to the geographical locations of the group, and according to who the leaders of these groups were after the death of Sabbatai Zevi.

== Sabbatean-related controversies in Jewish history ==
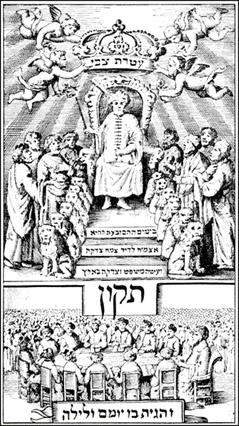
Sabbatai Zevi "enthroned" as the Jewish Messiah, from Tikkun, Amsterdam, 1666

=== The Emden-Eybeschutz controversy ===
The Emden-Eybeschutz controversy was a serious rabbinical disputation with wider political ramifications in Europe that followed the accusations by Rabbi Jacob Emden (1697–1776), a fierce opponent of the Sabbateans, against Rabbi Jonathan Eybeschutz (1690–1764) whom he accused of being a secret Sabbatean.

The Emden-Eybeschutz controversy arose concerning the amulets which Emden suspected Eybeschutz of issuing. It was alleged that these amulets recognized the messianic claims of Sabbatai Zevi. Emden then accused Eybeschutz of heresy. Emden was known for his attacks directed against the adherents, or those he supposed to be adherents, of Sabbatai Zevi. In Emden's eyes, Eybeschutz was a convicted Sabbatean. The controversy lasted several years, continuing even after Eybeschutz's death.

Emden's assertion of heresy was chiefly based on the interpretation of some amulets prepared by Eybeschutz, in which Emden professed to see Sabbatean allusions. Hostilities began before Eybeschutz left Prague; when Eybeschutz was named chief rabbi of the three communities of Altona, Hamburg, and Wandsbek in 1751, the controversy reached the stage of intense and bitter antagonism. Emden maintained that he was at first prevented by threats from publishing anything against Eybeschutz. He solemnly declared in his synagogue the writer of the amulets to be a Sabbatean heretic and deserving of ḥerem (excommunication).

The majority of the rabbis in Poland, Moravia, and Bohemia, as well as the leaders of the Three Communities, supported Eybeschutz: the accusation was "utterly incredible".

In July 1725, the Ashkenazic beth din of Amsterdam had issued a ban of excommunication on the entire Sabbatian sect (kat ha-ma'aminim). Writings of Sabbatian nature found by the beit Din at that time were attributed to Eybeschutz. In early September, similar proclamations were issued by the batei din of Frankfurt and the triple community of Altona, Hamburg, and Wandsbeck. The three bans were printed and circulated in other Jewish communities throughout Europe. Rabbi Ezekiel Katzenellenbogen, the chief rabbi of the Triple Community and Rabbi Moses Hagiz were unwilling to attack Eybeschütz publicly, mentioning that "greater than him have fallen and crumbled" and that "there is nothing we can do to him". However, Rabbi Katzenelenbogen stated that one of the texts found by the Amsterdam beit din Va'avo Hayom el Ha'Ayin "And I Came This Day into the Fountain" was authored by Jonathan Eybeschütz and declared that the all copies of the work that were in circulation should be immediately burned. Emden later suggested that the rabbis decided against attacking Eybeschutz out of a reluctance to offend his powerful family and a fear of rich supporters of his living in their communities. As a result of Eybeschutz and other rabbis in Prague formulating a new (and different) ban against Sabbatianism in September of that year his reputation was restored and Eybeschutz was regarded as having been totally vindicated. The issue was to arise again, albeit tangentially, in the 1751 dispute between Emden and Eybeschutz.

The controversy was a momentous incident in Jewish history of the period, involving both Yechezkel Landau and the Vilna Gaon, and may be credited with having crushed the lingering belief in Sabbatai current even in some Orthodox circles. In 1760 the quarrel broke out once more when some Sabbatean elements were discovered among the students of Eybeschutz' yeshiva. At the same time his younger son, Wolf, presented himself as a Sabbatean prophet, with the result that the yeshiva was closed.

=== Sabbateans and early Hasidism ===
Some scholars see seeds of the Hasidic movement within the Sabbatean movement. When Hasidism began to spread its influence, a serious schism evolved between the Hasidic and non-Hasidic Jews. Those who rejected the Hasidic movement dubbed themselves as misnagdim ("opponents").

Another point of conflict was the fact that earlier than the Hasidim originated from Baal Shem Tov, there was another group of Kabbalists who were followers of Judah ha-Hasid and Hayim Malakh, who called themselves "Hasidim". This group which was openly Sabbatean, operated in the same areas of influence of Baal Shem Tov's hasidim such as Podolia. Their famous 1700 failed aliyah to Jerusalem and subsequent revelation of antinomian practices by the members of the group, such as worship of a wooden image of Sabbatai Zevi, made many rabbis suspicious of the later unrelated "Hasidim". Baal Shem Tov's association with the Vilna Sabbatean Joshua Heschel Zoref further fueled these suspicions.

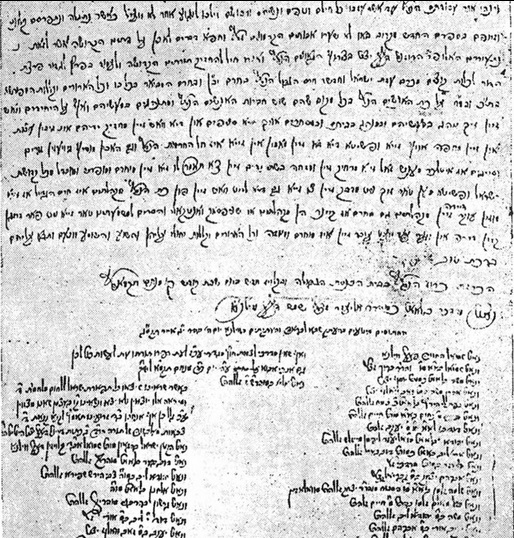
The excommunication (Cherem) of Hasidism signed by Vilna Gaon.

Critics of Hasidic Judaism, most famously Vilna Gaon expressed concern that Hasidism might become a messianic sect as had occurred among the followers of both Sabbatai Zevi and Jacob Frank. Vilna Gaon supported an excommunication against the Hasidim in 1772 and 1781. The famous quote from Vilna Gaon explicitly equates hasidism with Sabbateanism, although some scholars argue about its authenticity.

והגאון החסיד ר' אליהו ווילנה אמר עליהם שהכת הזאת המה מקליפות נוגה שיש להם איזה מידות טובות בנגלה ותוכם מלא אפיקורסות מכת הש[בתי] צ[בי]. אוי לנו שבימינו עלתה כך.

The pious Gaon, R. Elijah of Vilna, said about them that this sect is from the kelipat nogah; they have some good qualities in the revealed Torah, but within them they are filled with heresy from the sect of Sabbatai Zevi. Woe to us that this has arisen in our days.”

The anti hasidic book Zamir Arizim ("זמיר עריצים") which is often attributed to rabbi Aryeh Yehudah Leib ben Mordechai of Brody contains two passages about the alleged connection between hasidism and sabbateanism.

"כת אחת 'שבתי צבי' אשר ילדה לה שני בנים כחשים, הפראנקים והחסידים."

“One sect, ‘Sabbatai Zevi,’ which gave birth to two degenerate sons: the Frankists and the Hasidim.” Woe to us that this has arisen in our days.”

"שם שבתי צבי ימ״ש וסייעתו… ותלמידי ר' ישראל בעל שם טוב."

“There [in Gehinnom] are Sabbatai Zevi, may his name be obliterated, and his followers… and the disciples of R. Israel Ba'al Shem Tov.”

It could be argued that since Hasidim shared features with Sabbateanism such as a charismatic leader, Kabbalistic innovations, popular messianism, ecstatic and unusual prayers and possibility of disregarding halacha in the name of spirituality it worried the rabbinical community. Consequently, some Mitnagdim regarded Hasidism as a possible recurrence of the same phenomenon, even when they did not literally believe the Hasidim were secret followers of Sabbatai Zevi.

However the Baal Shem Tov, the founder of Hasidism, came at a time when the Jewish masses of Eastern Europe were reeling in bewilderment and disappointment engendered by the two Jewish false messiahs Sabbatai Zevi (1626–1676) and Jacob Frank (1726–1791) in particular.

=== Sabbateans and modern secularism ===
Some scholars have claimed that the Sabbatean movement in general fostered and connected well with the principles of modern secularism.

== Rabbis who opposed the Sabbateans ==
- Joseph Escapa (1572–1662) was especially known for having been the teacher of Zevi and for having afterward excommunicated him.
- Aaron Lapapa (1590–1674) was the rabbi at Smyrna in 1665, when Zevi's movement was at its height there. He was one of the few rabbis to oppose and excommunicate Zevi. Zevi and his adherents retorted by deposing him and forcing him to leave the city, and his office was given to his colleague, Hayyim Benveniste, at that time one of Sabbatai's followers. After Sabbatai's conversion to Islam, Lapapa seems to have been reinstated.
- Jacob ben Aaron Sasportas (1610–1698) was one of the fiercest opponents of the Sabbatean movement. He wrote many letters to various communities in Europe, Asia, and Africa, exhorting them to unmask the impostors and to warn the people against them. He documented his struggle in his book Tzitzat Novel Tzvi, the title being based on Isaiah 28:4. He wrote a number of works, such as Toledot Ya'akob (1652), an index of Biblical passages found in the haggadah of the Jerusalem Talmud, similar to Aaron Pesaro's Toledot Aharon, which relates to the Babylonian Talmud only; and Ohel Ya'akov (1737), a volume of halachic responsa which includes polemical correspondence against Zevi and his followers.
- Jacob Hagis (1620–1674) was one of Zevi's chief opponents, who put him under the ban. About 1673 Hagis went to Constantinople to publish his Lehem ha-Panim, but he died there before this was accomplished. This book, as well as many others of his, was lost.
- Naphtali Cohen (1649–1718) was a kabbalist who was tricked into giving an approbation to a book by the Sabbatean Nehemiah Hayyun. Provided with this and with other recommendations secured in the same way, Hayyun traveled throughout Moravia and Silesia, propagating everywhere his Sabbatean teachings. Cohen soon discovered his mistake, and endeavored, without success, to recover his approbation, although he did not as yet realize the full import of the book. It was in 1713, while Cohen was staying at Breslau (where he acted as a rabbi until 1716), that Haham Tzvi Ashkenazi of Amsterdam informed him of its tenets. Cohen thereupon acted rigorously. He launched a ban against the author and his book, and became one of the most zealous supporters of Haham Tzvi in his campaign against Hayyun.
- David Nieto (1654–1728) was the haham of the Spanish and Portuguese Jewish community in London. He waged war untiringly on the Sabbateans, which he regarded as dangerous to the best interests of Judaism, and in this connection wrote his Esh Dat (London, 1715) against Nehemiah Hayyun (who supported Zevi).
- Tzvi Ashkenazi (1656–1718) known as the Chacham Tzvi, for some time rabbi of Amsterdam, was a resolute opponent of the followers of Sabbatai Zevi. In Salonica he also witnessed the impact of the Sabbatai Zevi movement on the community, and this experience became a determining factor in his whole career. His son Jacob Emden served as rabbi in Emden and followed in his father's footsteps in combating the Sabbatean movement.
- Moses Hagiz (1671 – c. 1750) was born in Jerusalem and waged a campaign against Sabbatean emissaries during 1725–1726.
- Jacob Emden (1697–1776) was Talmudic scholar and leading opponent of the Sabbatians. He is best known as the opponent of Rabbi Jonathan Eybeschutz, whom he accused of being a Sabbatean during The Emden-Eybeschütz Controversy.

== Notable people ==
- Mehmed Cavid
- Jacob Frank
- Nehemiah Hayyun
- Hasan Tahsin
- Doctor Nazım
- Sabiha Sertel
- Ahmet Emin Yalman

== See also ==
- Crypto-Judaism
- Frankism
- Islam and Judaism
- Jewish schisms
- Johan Kemper
- List of messiah claimants
- Messianism
- Behr Perlhefter
- Joshua Heschel Zoref
