= Sabbatai Zevi =

Jewish mystic and self-proclaimed Messiah (1626–1676)

- שַׁבְּתַי צְבִי
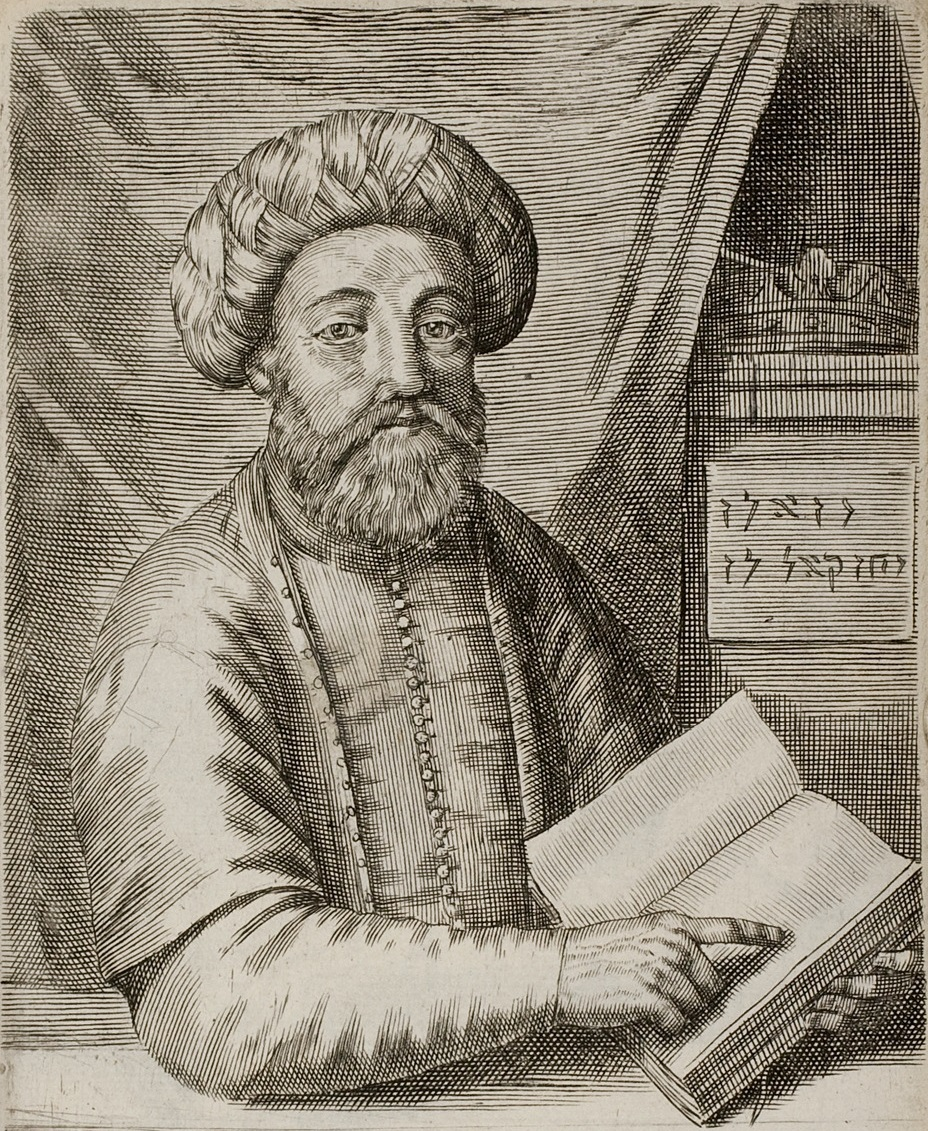
- Sabbatai Zevi, dressed in Kaftan, 1669.

Personal life
- Born: August 1, 1626 İzmir, Ottoman Empire (modern İzmir, Turkey)
- Died: c. September 17, 1676 (aged 50) Ulcinj, Ottoman Empire (modern Montenegro)

Religious life
- Religion: Judaism, later Islam
- Founder of: Sabbateanism

Sabbatai Zevi (Hebrew: שַׁבְּתַי צְבִי, romanized: Šabbəṯay Ṣəḇī, (Note: Turkish: Sabetay Sevi; also spelled as Shabbetai Ẓevi, Shabbeṯāy Ṣeḇī, Shabsai Tzvi, Sabbatai Zvi, or Shabtai Zvi) August 1, 1626 – c. September 17, 1676), or Shabtai Tzvi, was a former Jewish mystic and rabbi from Smyrna, whose family were Romaniote Jews from Patras.. Active throughout the Ottoman Empire, Zevi claimed to be the long-awaited Jewish Messiah and founded the Sabbatean movement, which gained significant traction among Jews. He eventually converted to Islam.

Central to his teachings was the belief that during the Messianic Age, acts traditionally considered sinful would transform into righteous ones. This antinomian doctrine led Zevi and his followers to deliberately violate Jewish commandments, a controversial practice that later inspired movements like the Frankists.

Upon arriving in Constantinople in February 1666, Sabbatai was imprisoned on the order of the grand vizier Köprülüzade Fazıl Ahmed Pasha. In September, after being moved from different prisons around the capital to the imperial courts' seat in Adrianople (now Edirne), he was convicted of fomenting sedition. Sabbatai was given the choice of death or conversion to Islam by the Grand Vizier representing Sultan Mehmed IV. He chose conversion, donning an Islamic turban from then on. The heads of the Ottoman state rewarded him with a generous pension for complying with their political and religious plans. About 300 families who followed Zevi also converted to Islam and became known as the Dönme, Turkish for "converts".

Subsequently, the Ottomans banished him twice, first within Constantinople, and, after he was heard singing Psalms with Jews there, to a small town known today as Ulcinj in what is now Montenegro. He died in isolation.

== Early life and education ==
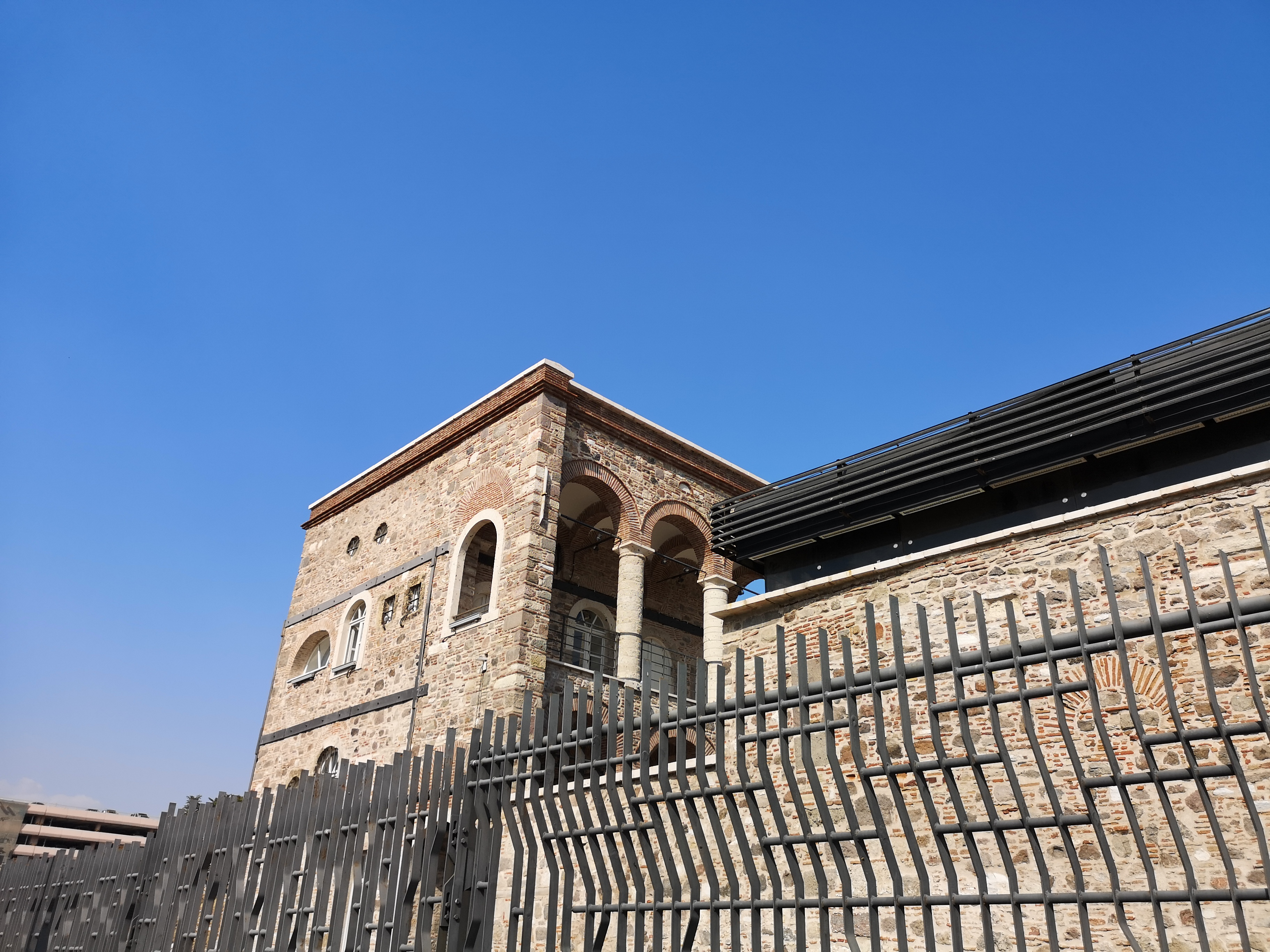
House of Sabbatai Zevi, building in the Agora of Smyrna where Sabbatai Zevi supposedly lived

A portrait of Sabbatai Zevi.

Portrait of Sabbatai Zevi in Brockhaus and Efron Jewish Encyclopedia, 1906.

Sabbatai Zevi was born in the Ottoman city of Smyrna, allegedly on Tisha B'Av, one of Judaism's fast days, during The Three Weeks in 1626. In Hebrew, Sabbatai means Saturn; in Jewish tradition, "the reign of Sabbatai", the highest planet, was often linked to the advent of the Messiah.

Zevi's family were Romaniote Jews from Patras. His father, Mordecai, was a poultry dealer in the Morea. During the Ottoman–Venetian wars, Smyrna became the center of Levantine trade, and Mordecai became the Smyrnan agent of an English trading house, achieving some wealth in the process. His sister, Orah Gadol, was a learned woman in her own right, well known among the Jews of Smyrna.

Following the prevailing Jewish custom of the time, Sabbatai's father had him study the Talmud. He attended a yeshiva under the chief rabbi of Smyrna, Joseph Escapa. Studies in halakha (Jewish law) did not appeal to him, but Zevi did attain proficiency in the Talmud. At the same time, he was fascinated by mysticism and Kabbalah and was influenced by Isaac Luria. Practical Kabbalah, whose devotees used asceticism to communicate with God and the angels to predict the future and perform miracles, was especially appealing to him. As well as Luria's writings, he read the Zohar and practiced asceticism and Kabbalistic purification exercises called tikkunim.

== Personal history ==
=== Influence of English millenarianism ===
During the first half of the 17th century, millenarian ideas about the approach of the Messianic Age were popular. They included ideas about the redemption of the Jews and their return to the land of Israel with independent sovereignty. Christian authors identified the apocalyptic year as 1666, and millenarianism was widespread in England. This belief was so prevalent that Menasseh Ben Israel, in his letter to Oliver Cromwell and the Rump Parliament, appealed to it as a reason to readmit Jews into England, saying, "the opinions of many Christians and mine do concur herein, that we both believe that the restoring time of our Nation into their native country is very near at hand."

As Sabbatai's father was the agent for an English trading house in Smyrna, he must have had business contacts with English people. His son may have learned something about Western millennial expectations at home. Scholars are still assessing how much English and Dutch Calvinist millenarianism influenced the messianic movement that developed around Zevi's activities.

=== Claims to being the expected Jewish Messiah ===
Along with general messianic beliefs, there was another computation based on a passage in the Zohar, a famous Jewish mystical text, that the Israelites would be redeemed by the long-awaited Jewish Messiah in 1648.

In 1648, Shabbatai announced to his followers in Smyrna that he was the anticipated messianic redeemer. To prove this, he started to pronounce the Tetragrammaton, an act prohibited to all but the High Priest of Israel in the Temple in Jerusalem on Yom Kippur. Since the Temple had been destroyed in the Siege of Jerusalem (70 CE), this act was highly symbolic. Shabbatai also claimed he could fly, but told his followers he could not do so publicly because they were "not worthy enough" to witness it. He also claimed to have visions of God.

Shabbatai revealed his claim to being the Messiah early on to Isaac Silveyra and Moses Pinheiro, the latter the grandfather of the Italian rabbi Joseph Ergas.

At 22, Shabbatai was still too young to be considered an established rabbinic authority; his influence in the local community was limited. Even though he had led the pious life of a mystic in Smyrna for several years, the older, more established rabbinic leadership was suspicious of his activities and the local college of rabbis. Headed by his teacher, Joseph Escapa, they watched him. When his messianic pretensions became too bold, he and his followers were subjected to an edict of ḥerem, a type of excommunication in Judaism.

In about 1651 (or 1654), the rabbis banished Shabbatai and his disciples from Smyrna. It is uncertain where he went from there, but by 1658, he surfaced in Constantinople. There, he met a preacher, Abraham Yachini, a disciple of the Talmudic scholar Joseph Trani, who confirmed his messianic mission. Yachini is said to have forged a manuscript in archaic characters that attested to Shabbatai's claim to be the Messiah. It was titled The Great Wisdom of Solomon and began:

I, Abraham, was confined in a cave for forty years, and I wondered greatly that the time of miracles did not arrive. Then was heard a voice proclaiming, "A son will be born in the Hebrew year 5386 [the year 1626 CE] to Mordecai Zevi; and he will be called Shabbethai. He will humble the great dragon; ... he, the true Messiah, will sit upon My throne."

=== In Salonica, Cairo, and Jerusalem ===
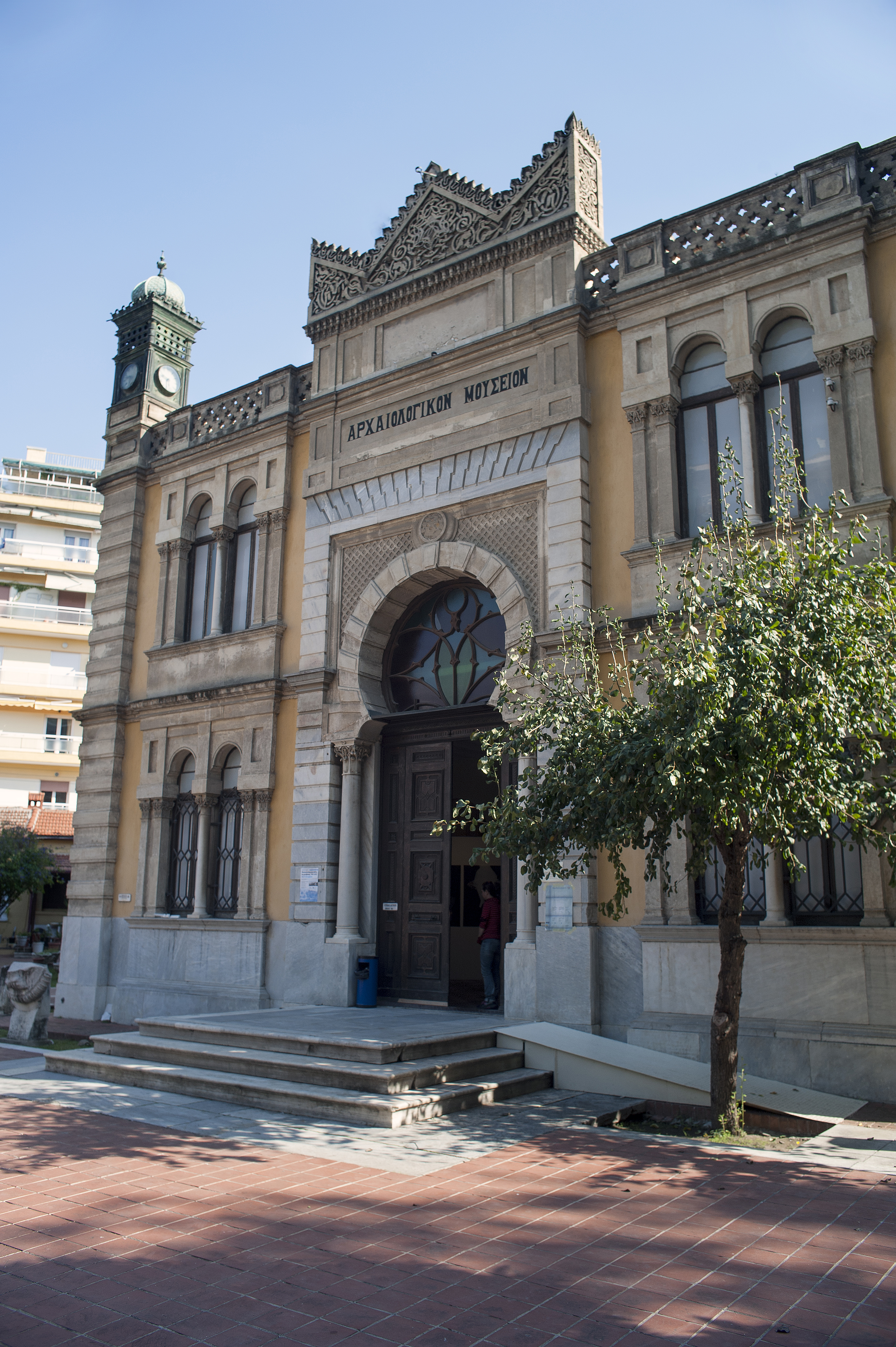
The Yeni Mosque, Thessaloniki, built by the Dönme community during the late Ottoman period.

Equipped with this document, Sabbatai chose Salonica, then a hub of Kabbalistic dialogue, as his base. He proclaimed himself the Messiah, or "anointed one", and attracted a large following by hosting various mystical events. For instance, he celebrated his marriage to the Torah, calling it the "One Without End" (the Ein Sof), and organized a solemn festival to which he invited his friends. But the rabbis of Salonica, led by Abraham de Boton, expelled him from the city. Reports vary on his subsequent movements, with Alexandria, Athens, Constantinople, Jerusalem, and Smyrna mentioned as temporary bases he might have taken. Eventually, he settled in Cairo, where he lived for about two years (1660–1662).

There he befriended Raphael Joseph Halabi, a wealthy and influential Jew who held the high position of mint-master and tax farmer in Ottoman Cairo. Raphael Joseph led an ascetic life, which included fasting, bathing in cold water, and scourging himself at night. He used his great wealth for charity, supporting poor Talmudists and Kabbalists, fifty of whom reportedly regularly dined at his table. He became a supporter and promoter of Sabbatai's messianic claims.

Around 1663, Sabbatai moved to Jerusalem, where he resumed ascetic practices of frequent fasting and other penances. Many saw this as proof of his extraordinary piety. He was said to have a good voice and to attract large audiences when he sang psalms all night long or Spanish love songs, to which he gave mystical interpretations. At other times, he prayed and cried at the graves of pious men and women or distributed confections to children on the streets. Gradually, he gathered a larger circle of adherents.

At the time, Jerusalem's Jewish community was in desperate need of money to pay the Ottoman government's high taxes. Known as the favourite of Raphael Joseph Halabi, Sabbatai was chosen to appeal to him for money and support. He secured the funds, raising his prestige. His followers dated his public career from this journey to Cairo.

=== Marriage to Sarah ===
Another significant event during his second stay in Cairo contributed to Sabbatai's reputation in the Jewish community. During the Khmelnytsky Uprising in Poland, a young Jewish orphan named Sarah was discovered by Christians and sent to a convent for care. After ten years, at around sixteen, she escaped—claiming it was through a miracle—and made her way to Amsterdam. Subsequently, she traveled to Livorno, where reports indicated that she led a life of prostitution while also embracing the belief that she would become the bride of the Messiah, whose arrival was thought to be imminent.

When a report of her adventures reached Cairo, Sabbatai claimed that such a consort had been promised to him in a dream because he, as the Messiah, was bound to fall in love with an unchaste woman. He reportedly sent messengers to Livorno to bring Sarah to him, and they married at Halabi's house. Her beauty and eccentricity reportedly helped him gain new followers. Through her, a new romantic and licentious element entered Sabbatai's career. The overturning of her past life was interpreted by Sabbatai's followers as further confirmation of his messiahship, following the Biblical story of the prophet Hosea, who had also been commanded to take a "wife of whoredom" as the first symbolic act of his calling.

=== Nathan of Gaza ===
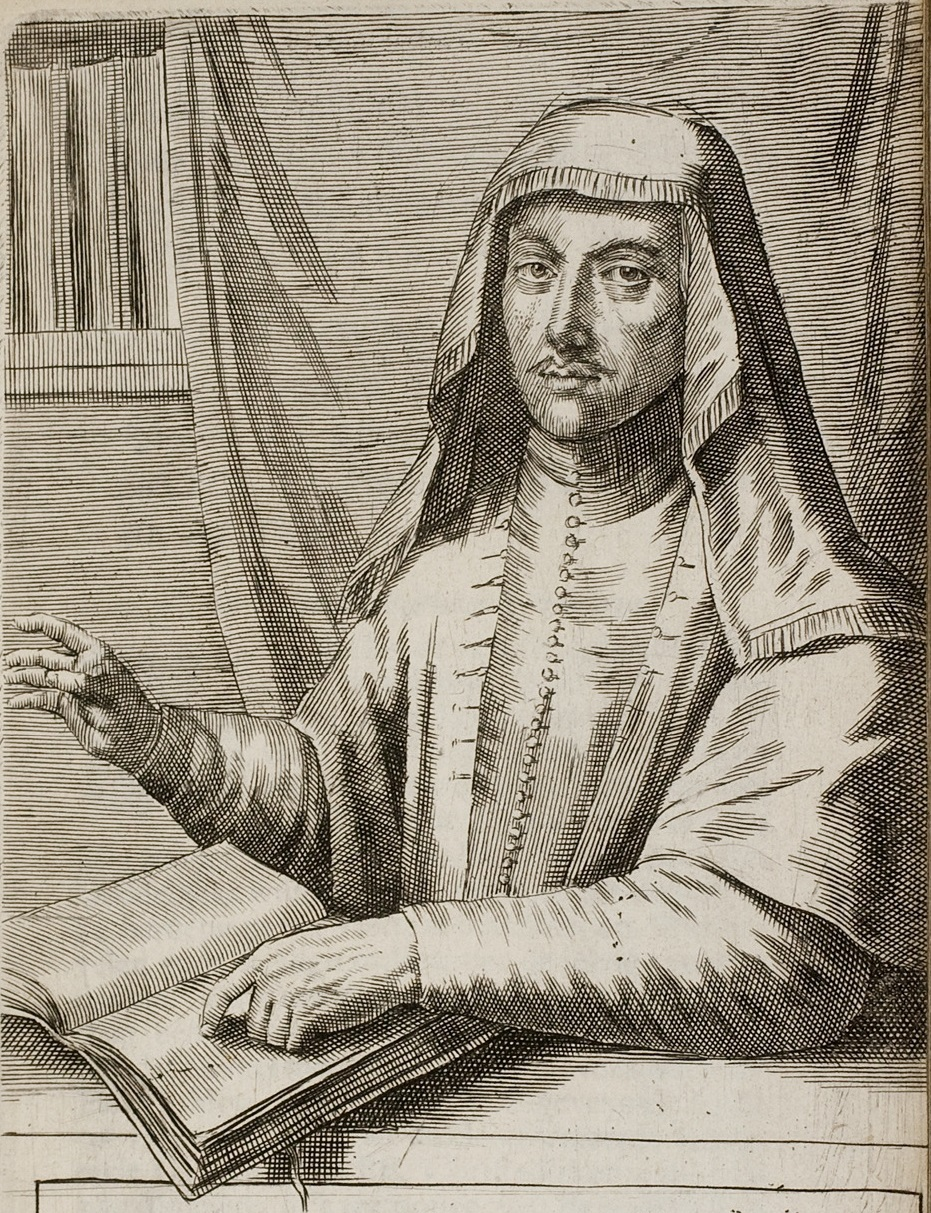
One of the earliest gravure depictions of Nathan of Gaza, published in Thomas Coenen's book Ydele Verwachtinge der Joden, dated 1669.

With Halabi's financial and political backing, a charming wife, and many additional followers, Shabbatai returned to Jerusalem in triumph. Passing through the city of Gaza, which at the time had an important Jewish community, he met Nathan Benjamin Levi, known since as Nathan of Gaza (Hebrew: נתן העזתי, romanized: Nāṯān hāʿAzzāṯi), who became very active in Shabbatai's messianic career, serving as his right-hand man and declaring himself to be the risen Elijah, who, it was predicted, would proclaim the arrival of the Messiah. In 1665, Nathan announced that the Messianic Age would begin in 1666 with the conquest of the world without bloodshed. The Messiah would lead the Ten Lost Tribes back to the Holy Land, "riding on a lion with a seven-headed dragon in its jaws".

The rabbis of Jerusalem viewed Shabbatai's movement with great suspicion and threatened its followers with excommunication. Acknowledging that Jerusalem was not the best place to carry out his plans, Shabbatai left for his native Smyrna. Nathan proclaimed that, henceforth, Gaza, rather than Jerusalem, would be the sacred city. On his way from Jerusalem to Smyrna, Shabbatai was greeted enthusiastically in Aleppo. In Smyrna, which he reached in the autumn of 1665, great homage was paid to him. After some hesitation, he declared himself to be the expected Messiah during Rosh Hashanah in 1665; his declaration was made in the synagogue with the blowing of shofars and shouts of "Long live our King, our Messiah!"

His followers then began to refer to him as AMIRAH, a Hebrew acronym for the phrase "Our Lord and King, his Majesty be exalted" (Adoneinu Malkeinu Yarum Hodo).

=== Proclaimed messiah ===
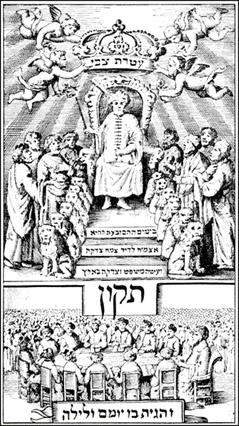
"Sabbatai Zevi enthroned" (image from the Amsterdam/Jewish publication Tikkun, Amsterdam, 1666).

Shabbatai, assisted by his wife, became the community leader and used his power to crush any opposition. He deposed the existing rabbi of Smyrna, Aaron Lapapa, and appointed Chaim Benveniste in his place. Italy, Germany, and the Netherlands were already centres of his messianic movement, and the Jews of Hamburg and Amsterdam learned of the events in Smyrna from Christians. Henry Oldenburg, a German savant who became the first secretary of the Royal Society, wrote to Baruch Spinoza (Spinozae Epistolae No. 33): "All the world here is talking of a rumour of the return of the Israelites ... to their own country. ... Should the news be confirmed, it may bring about a revolution in all things."

Shabbatai's followers soon included many prominent rabbis, such as Isaac Aboab da Fonseca, Moses Raphael de Aguilar, Moshe ben Yonatan Galante, Moses ben Mordecai Zacuto, and Chaim Benveniste. Benjamin Musaphia, an adherent of Spinoza, also became a follower. Meanwhile, fantastic reports circulated and were widely believed. For example, it was said, "In the north of Scotland a ship had appeared with silken sails and ropes, manned by sailors who spoke Hebrew. The flag bore the inscription 'The Twelve Tribes of Israel'." The Jewish community of Avignon, France, prepared to emigrate to the new kingdom in the spring of 1666.

Jewish readiness to believe Shabbatai Zevi's messianic claims may largely be explained by the desperate state of European Jewry in the mid-17th century. The bloody pogroms of the Khmelnytsky Uprising had wiped out an estimated 10,000–20,000 Jews in Eastern Europe and destroyed many centres of Jewish learning and communal life.

=== Spread of Sabbatai Zevi's influence ===
Probably with his consent, Shabbatai's adherents planned to abolish most of the halakha in an act of antinomianism. This included the commandments, because, according to a minority opinion in the Talmud, in the Messianic Age, there would no longer be holy obligations. The fast of the Tenth of Tevet became a day of feasting and rejoicing. In contrast to this viewpoint, Maoz Kahane demonstrated that Shabbatai himself did not aim to alter the entirety of halakha, but instead sought to modify specific aspects of it. Furthermore, each of these modifications was justified by a halakhic rationale. Samuel Primo, who became Sabbatai's secretary when he went to Smyrna, directed the following circular to all of the Jews in the name of the Messiah:

The first-begotten Son of God, Shabbethai Tsebi, Messiah and Redeemer of the people of Israel, to all the sons of Israel, Peace! Since ye have been deemed worthy to behold the great day and the fulfilment of God's word by the Prophets, your lament and sorrow must be changed into joy, and your fasting into merriment; for ye shall weep no more. Rejoice with song and melody, and change the day formerly spent in sadness and sorrow into a day of jubilee, because I have appeared.

Primo's message was considered blasphemous because Shabbatai wanted to celebrate his birthday rather than observe the significant holy day of mourning, Tisha B'Av. There was outrage and dissension in the communities, while many leaders sympathetic to the movement were shocked by such radical innovations. Solomon Nissim Algazi, a prominent Talmudist of Smyrna, and other members of the rabbinate who opposed the abolition of the fast, narrowly escaped death at the hands of Sabbatai's followers.

=== In Constantinople ===
At the beginning of 1666, Shabbatai left Smyrna for Constantinople, possibly forced out by city officials. Since Nathan of Gaza had prophesied that, once in Constantinople, Shabbatai would place the sultan's crown on his head, the grand vizier, Köprülüzade Fazıl Ahmed Pasha, ordered Shabbatai's immediate arrest and had him imprisoned, maybe to avoid any doubts as to the power still wielded by the Sultanate. But his imprisonment discouraged neither Shabbatai nor his followers. He was treated well in prison, perhaps due to bribes, which strengthened his followers' belief in him. Meanwhile, Nathan of Gaza, Abraham Yakhini, and others circulated reports of the Messiah's miraculous activities in the Ottoman capital, and messianic expectations in the Jewish diaspora continued to rise.

=== At Abydos (Migdal Oz) ===
After two months' imprisonment in Constantinople, Sabbatai was moved to the castle prison at Abydos, Hellespont, accompanied by some of his friends. The Sabbateans then renamed the fortress Migdal ʿOz "Tower of Strength." As Shabbatai had arrived on the day preceding Passover, he slew a paschal lamb for himself and his followers and ate it with its fat, a violation of halakha. He is said to have pronounced over it the benediction, "Blessed be God who has restored that which was forbidden."

The immense sums his rich followers sent him, the queenly Sarah's charms, and the cooperation of Ottoman officials and others enabled Shabbatai to show off almost royal splendor in prison at Abydos. Accounts of his life there were exaggerated and spread among Jews in Europe, Asia, and Africa, and in some parts of Europe, Jews began to unroof their houses and prepare for a new "exodus". Sabbatai's initials were posted in almost every synagogue. Prayers for him were said as follows: "Bless our Lord and King, the holy and righteous Sabbatai Zevi, the Messiah of the God of Jacob." In Hamburg, the council introduced the custom of praying for Shabbatai not only on Shabbat, but also on Monday and Thursday; unbelievers were compelled to remain in the synagogue and join in the prayer with a loud Amen. Sabbatai's picture was printed with that of King David in most prayer books, along with his Kabbalistic formulas and penances.

Such innovations caused great commotion in some communities. In Moravia, excitement reached such a pitch that the government had to intervene, while at Salé, Morocco, the emir ordered a persecution of the Jews. During this period, Shabbatai declared the fasts of the Seventeenth of Tammuz and Tisha B'Av (his birthday) would henceforth be feast days and contemplated converting Yom Kippur to a day of celebration.

=== Nehemiah HaKohen ===
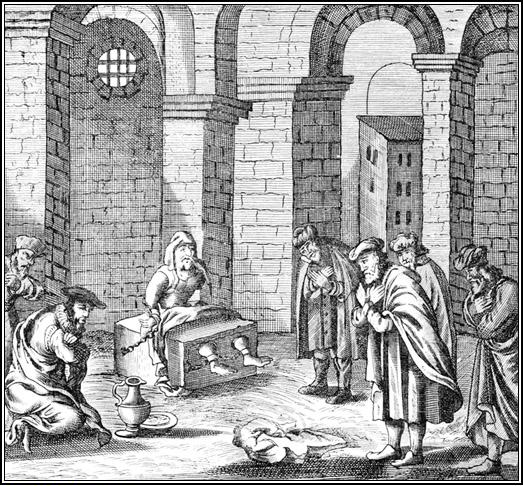
Sabbatai Zevi as a prisoner in the castle at Abydos.

While Sabbatai was in Abydos prison, an incident ultimately led to his downfall. Polish Jewish communities, hearing of Sabbatai's Messianic claims, sent the Kabbalist Nehemiah HaKohen to interview him in his captivity. Nehemiah reached Abydos in September 1666 after a three-month journey. The meeting did not go well, and Nehemiah declared Sabbatai an impostor. Some Sabbataians are said to have contemplated murdering Nehemiah as a rival.

=== Conversion to Islam ===
Nehemiah escaped to Constantinople, where he pretended to embrace Islam to get an audience with the kaymakam to tell him of Shabbatai's ambitions. The kaymakam informed Sultan Mehmed IV. Shabbatai was removed from Abydos and taken to Adrianople, where the vizier gave him three choices: subject himself to a trial of his divinity in the form of a volley of arrows (should the archers miss, his divinity would be proven), be impaled, or convert to Islam.

The next day (September 16, 1666), Zevi appeared before the sultan, cast off his Jewish clothing, and put a turban on his head, thereby converting to Islam. Satisfied, the sultan rewarded Shabbatai by conferring on him the title effendi and appointing him as his doorkeeper on a generous salary. Sarah and approximately 300 families among his followers also converted to Islam. Thereafter, these new Muslims were known as the Dönme. Shabbatai was ordered to take a second wife to confirm his conversion. Some days later, he wrote to the community in Smyrna, "God has made me an Ishmaelite; He commanded, and it was done. The ninth day of my regeneration."

=== Disillusionment ===
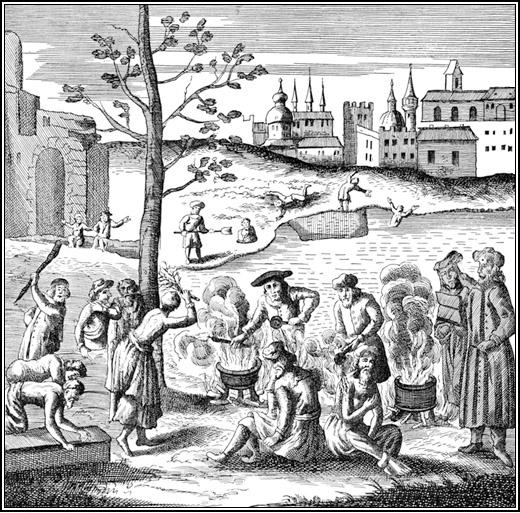
Former followers of Sabbatai do penance for their support of him.

Shabbatai's conversion devastated his followers, and Muslims ridiculed them. Despite his apostasy, many of his adherents still believed in him, claiming that his conversion was a part of the messianic scheme. Those such as Nathan of Gaza and Primo, who were interested in maintaining the movement, encouraged such belief. In many communities, the Seventeenth of Tammuz and Tisha B'Av were still observed as feast days despite bans and excommunications by the rabbis.

At times, Sabbatai assumed the role of a pious Muslim and reviled Judaism; at others, he acted as a Jew. In March 1668, he announced that he had been filled with the Holy Spirit at Passover and had received a revelation.

Either Shabbatai or one of his followers published a mystical work claiming he was the true Messiah despite his conversion, and that his goal was to bring thousands of Muslims to Judaism. But he told the Sultan that he was trying to convert Jews to Islam, and the Sultan permitted him to associate with other Jews and preach in their synagogues.

=== Last years ===
Gradually, the Turks grew tired of Sabbatai's antics and ended his doorkeeper's salary. At the beginning of 1673, the sultan had Zevi exiled to Ulcinj (Dulcigno, Turkish: Ulkum), where his wife died in 1674. Zevi then married Esther, the daughter of rabbi Joseph Filosoff of Thessaloniki.

=== Death ===
In August 1676, Sabbatai wrote to the Jewish community in Berat, Albania, requesting religious books. Shortly thereafter, he died in isolation—according to some accounts, on September 17, the High Holy Day of Yom Kippur. Upon his death, his widow, brother, and children by his first wife moved to Thessaloniki.

His tomb was believed to be in Berat, at a Sufi lodge built in the yard of the King Mosque, Berat (Albanian: Xhamia e Mbretit), where a tomb stood until 1967. Research done in 1985 suggests that he was buried in Dulcigno. His biographer Gershom Scholem writes that his tomb was visited by Dönme pilgrims from Salonika until the early 20th century.

== Legacy ==
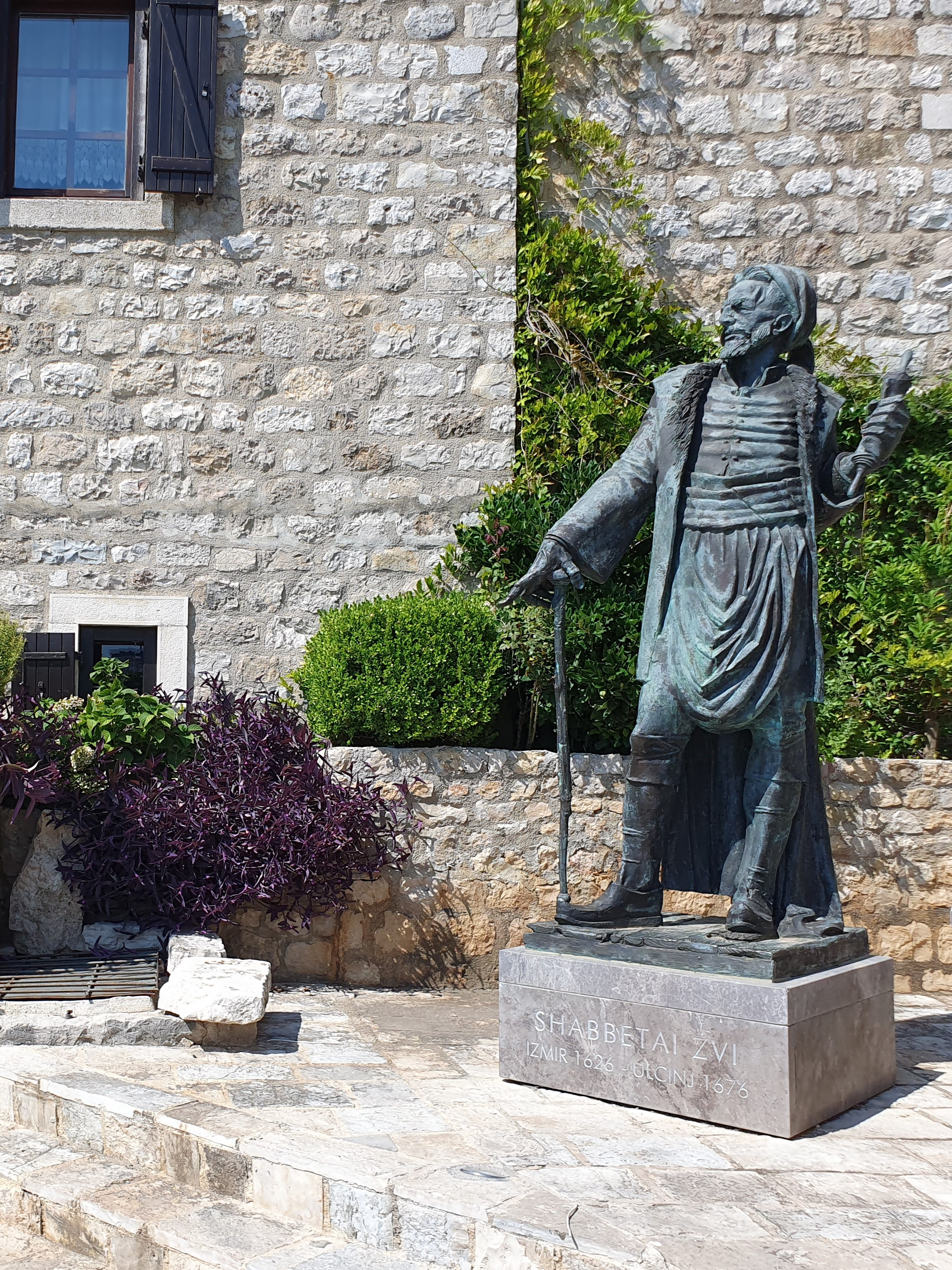
Statue of Sabbatai Zevi in Ulcinj, Montenegro

By the 19th century, the Dönme had become prominent in the tobacco and textile trades. They established progressive schools, and some members became politically active. Many joined the Committee of Union and Progress (CUP), the revolutionary party known as the Young Turks. With the major Dönmeh city of Selanik (now Thessaloniki) becoming part of Greece in 1912, Greece expelled the Muslims, including the Dönme, from its territory, with most migrating to Turkey. This was finalized with the 1923 population exchange between Greece and Turkey. By the mid-20th century, they had become highly assimilated.

Although little is known about them, various groups called Dönme continue to follow Sabbatai Zevi today, mostly in Turkey. Estimates of the numbers vary. As of 2016, perhaps 2,000 believing Dönme still lived in Turkey, though this is dwarfed by the number of people descended from the group. They have been described as presenting themselves as Muslim in public whilst practising their own forms of messianic/mystical Jewish beliefs in private. Some claim that Dönme still play a role in Turkish politics (one of interference), particularly some political parties in Turkey like the MHP. Others dismiss this as an antisemitic conspiracy theory.

The Dönme eventually split into three sects, each with quite different beliefs, as Ottoman Jewish scholars Abraham Danon and Joseph Nehama wrote in French-language articles in the Jewish Studies journal over 100 years ago. In the 1930s a comprehensive study on the history of the sects was also published in French by Abraham Galanté. More recently, Cengiz Şişman published a study called The Burden of Silence. According to a review in The Jerusalem Post, the branch known as Karakaş follow Sufi-influenced practices, while the Kapancıs have not been influenced by Islam at all and are now completely secular.

A house in the centre of İzmir, close to the Agora, has long been associated with Sabbetai Zevi. Having been left in ruins as recently as 2015, it has since been restored to its original style.

== See also ==
- Frankism
- Isaac La Peyrère
- Jacob Frank
- Jewish Messiah claimants
- Apostasy in Judaism
- List of messiah claimants
- Messiah complex
- Schisms among the Jews
- "Who is a Jew?"
