= Norman Stillman =

American historian

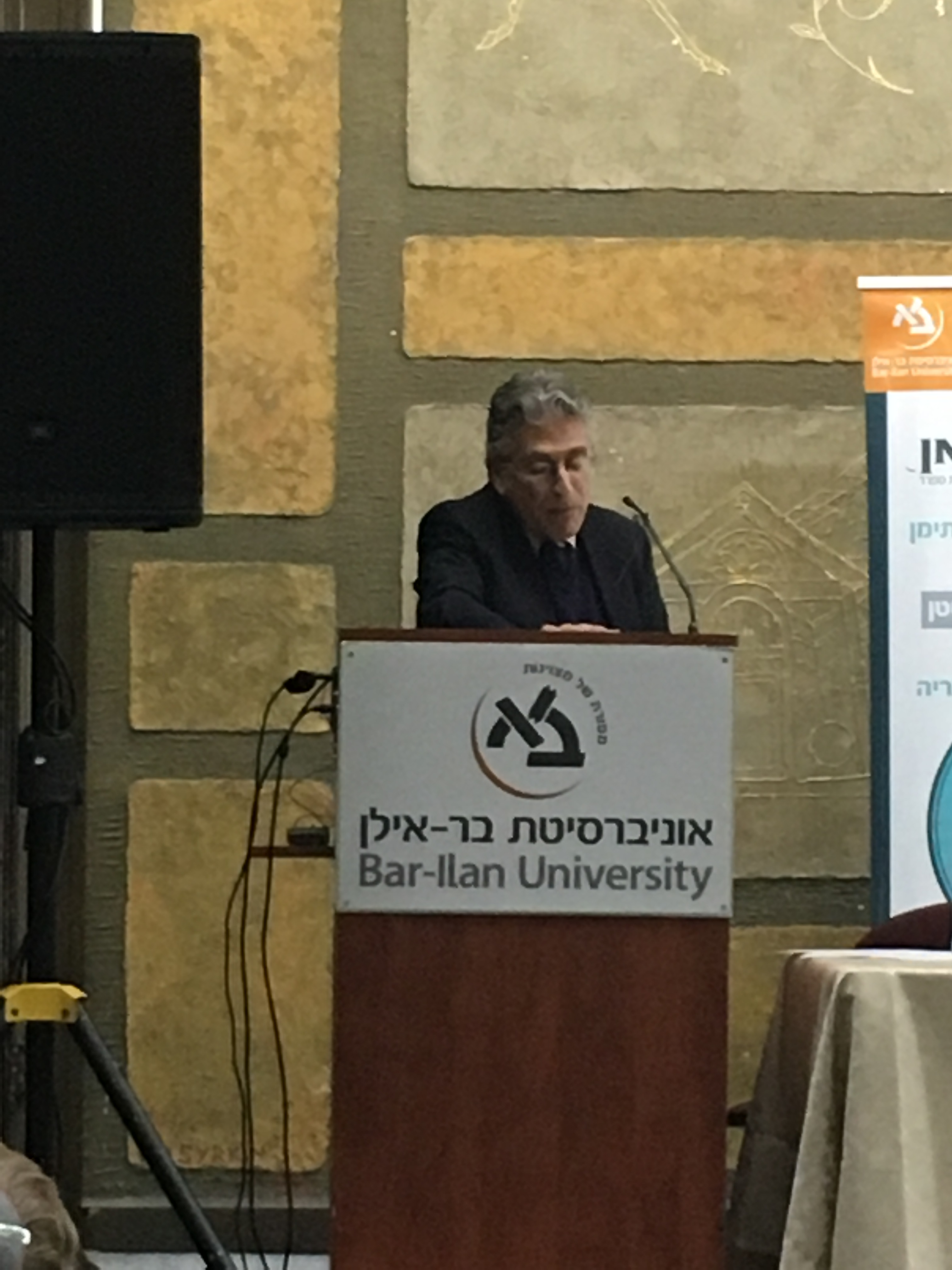
Norman Stillman, Bar-Ilan University in 2017

Norman Arthur Stillman, also Noam (נועם, in Hebrew; born 1945), is a Jewish-American academic, historian, and Orientalist, serving as the emeritus Schusterman-Josey Professor and emeritus Chair of Judaic History at the University of Oklahoma. He specializes in the intersection of Jewish and Islamic culture and history, and in Oriental and Sephardi Jewry, with special interest in the Jewish communities in North Africa. His major publications are The Jews of Arab Lands: a History And Source Book and Sephardi Religious Responses to Modernity. In the last few years, Stillman has been the executive editor of the "Encyclopedia of Jews in the Islamic World", a project that includes over 2000 entries in 5 volumes.

== Biography ==
Stillman studied at the University of Pennsylvania, receiving the B.A. (magna cum laude) in 1967 and Ph.D. in Oriental Studies in 1970, Shelomo Dov Goitein being his thesis advisor. He was a post-doctoral fellow at the Jewish Theological Seminary of America. He has received numerous academic honors, among them the Phi Beta Kappa, the SUNY Chancellor's Award for Excellence in Teaching and the SUNY-Binghamton award for Excellence in Undergraduate Teaching. He delivered the Momigliano Lectures for the University of Chicago's Committee on Social Thought and the Sherman Lectures for the School of Oriental and African Studies at the University of London. He was Lady Davis Fellow at the Hebrew University of Jerusalem in 1994-1995 and visiting fellow at the Moshe Dayan Center for Middle Eastern and African Studies at Tel-Aviv University. He received the Ohio State University Melton Center's Distinguished Humanist award in 2000 and was a visiting scholar at the Institut national des langues et civilisations orientales in Paris in 2001–2002. Stillman also appears in the 2005 film, The Hebrew Project. Stillman is the Chair of the Academic Committee of the Association for the Study of the Middle East and Africa (ASMEA).

Stillman was married to the late Yedida Kalfon Stillman, Professor of Near Eastern History and Languages, also at the University of Oklahoma, with whom he worked closely. He is the father to two children (a daughter and a son) and the grandfather of five.

== Research and activities ==
Stillman's current research projects are the Jewish Society and Community in North Africa in the Modern Period and Jewish and Islamic Languages as cultural phenomena. His research has included work on modern folk medicine, magic, and medieval pharmacology, which have been published in "The Language and Culture of the Jews of Sefrou", as well as in the Journal of the American Oriental Society, the Journal of the Economic and Social History of the Orient, and the Dictionary of the Middle Ages. He was editor of the journal of the Association for Jewish Studies from 1989 to 1999. Stillman teaches courses in Medieval Jewish History, Jewish Historiography, and the History of Judaism. In 2005, he held the Medieval and Renaissance Studies Committee annual public lecture of the Center for Arts and Humanities, University of Missouri.

== Publications ==
- The Jews of Arab Lands: A History and Source Book (1979)
- The Jews of Arab Lands in Modern Times (1991)
- The Language and Culture of the Jews of Sefrou: An Ethnolinguistic Study (1988)
- Sephardi Religious Responses to Modernity (1995)
- Samuel Romanell's Travail in an Arab Land (1989, in collaboration with Yedida Kalfon Stillman)
- From Iberia to Diaspora: Studies in Sephardic History and Culture (1998)
- Sephardi Religious Responses to Modernity (1995)
- Meḥḳere 'edot u-Genizah (1981)
- Studies in Judaism and Islam presented to Shelomo Dov Goitein on the occasion of his eightieth birthday by his students, colleagues, and friends (1981)
- Arab Dress: A Short History: From the Dawn of Islam to Modern Times by Yedida Kalfon Stillman and edited by Norman A. Stillman (2000)

== Notes ==
- sefroucity.com
