= Alberto Jori =

Italian philosopher (born 1965)

Alberto Jori (born 1965) is an Italian neo-Aristotelian philosopher.

Born in Mantua, on his father's side he is the descendant of an old noble Swiss family of barons (Freiherren) from Ticino and patricians from Zurich. On his mother's side he is related to a long Jewish line of Mantuan rabbis, from which the kabbalists Moses ben Mordecai Zacuto (also known as the Ramaz), Solomon Aviad Sar-Shalom Basilea and the mathematician Gino Fano were also members. He studied in Padua, Cambridge and Heidelberg and received a grant from the Alexander von Humboldt Foundation. In 2003, with his book on Aristotle, he won the prize of the International Academy of the History of Science (Paris, Sorbonne). He is Professor of Philosophy at the University of Tübingen, Germany, and is an exponent of the School of "Practical Philosophy". He is a member of the following academic institutions: "Accademia Ambrosiana", "Accademia Nazionale Virgiliana", and "International Academy of the History of Science" and is also co-founder of the "Academia Judaica/'Tarbut' - International Academy of Jewish Studies".

== Publications ==
- La responsabilità ecologica (ed.), Studium, Roma 1990 ISBN 88-382-3624-0
- Medicina e medici nell'antica Grecia. Saggio sul 'Perì technes' ippocratico, il Mulino, Bologna-Napoli 1996 ISBN 88-15-05792-7
- Aristotele, De caelo (ed.), Rusconi, Sant'Arcangelo di Romagna 1999 (II ed. Bompiani, Milano 2002)
- Lessing, Gli ebrei (ed.), Bompiani, Milano 2002
- Aristotele, Bruno Mondadori, Milano 2003 ISBN 88-424-9737-1
- Identità ebraica e sionismo in Alberto Cantoni, Giuntina, Firenze 2004 ISBN 88-8057-207-5
- Hermann Conring (1606–1681). Der Begründer der deutschen Rechtsgeschichte, MVK, Tübingen 2006 ISBN 3-935625-59-6
