= Ezekiel Katzenellenbogen =

Polish-German rabbi (1670–1749)

Ezekiel Katzenellenbogen ben Abraham (born in Lithuania about 1670; died at Altona, 9 July 1749) was a Polish-German rabbi.

At first rabbi at Kėdainiai (Keidani), Katzenellenbogen was called to Altona in 1714. This call he owed to the efforts of Issachar Kohen, an influential member of the Altona congregation; and Katzenellenbogen in return secured the election of Kohen's son-in-law to the rabbinate of Keidani. Jacob Emden, who reports this story in his Megillat Sefer (pp. 121–140), seems, however, to have been prejudiced against Katzenellenbogen, whom he describes as a man of very low moral character, an ignoramus, and a poor preacher.

Ezekiel ben Abraham Katzenellenbogen's descendants for four generations occupied rabbinates in various Polish communities. His epitaph is found in Blogg's Sefer ha-Ḥayyim (p. 337; Hanover, 1862). He wrote: Keneset Yeḥezḳel, responsa, Altona, 1732; Tefillot le-Yarẓait, prayers and rituals for Jahrzeit, ib. 1727; Ẓawwa'at R. Yeḥezḳel, his will, Amsterdam, 1750; Mayim [Mi-Yam?] Yeḥezḳel, homilies on the Pentateuch, Porick, 1786; and Leḥem Yeḥezḳl, Talmudic novellæ (mentioned in his preface to Keneset Yeḥezḳel, but never published). According to Steinschneider (Cat. Bodl.), Katzenellenbogen is probably the author of the Me'orer Zikkaron (Altona, 1727), an index to Talmudic passages with an abstract of the decisions of Rashi, the tosafists, etc.

== References from the Jewish Encyclopedia ==
- Emden, Megillat Sefer, pp. 121–140, Warsaw, 1897;
- Julius Fürst, Bibl. Jud. ii.179;
- Heinrich Grätz, Gesch. x.375;
- David Kohan (Kahana), in Ha-Shaḥar, 1874, p. 299;
- Moritz Steinschneider, Cat. Bodl.;
- Walden, Shem ha-Gedolim he-Ḥadash, p. 29, Warsaw, 1864;
- Duckesz, lwwah le-Moshab, Cracow, 1903;
- Benjacob, Oẓar ha-Sefarim
