= Rotonda di San Lorenzo =

Church building in Mantua, Italy

Coordinates: 45°09′29″N 10°47′40″E

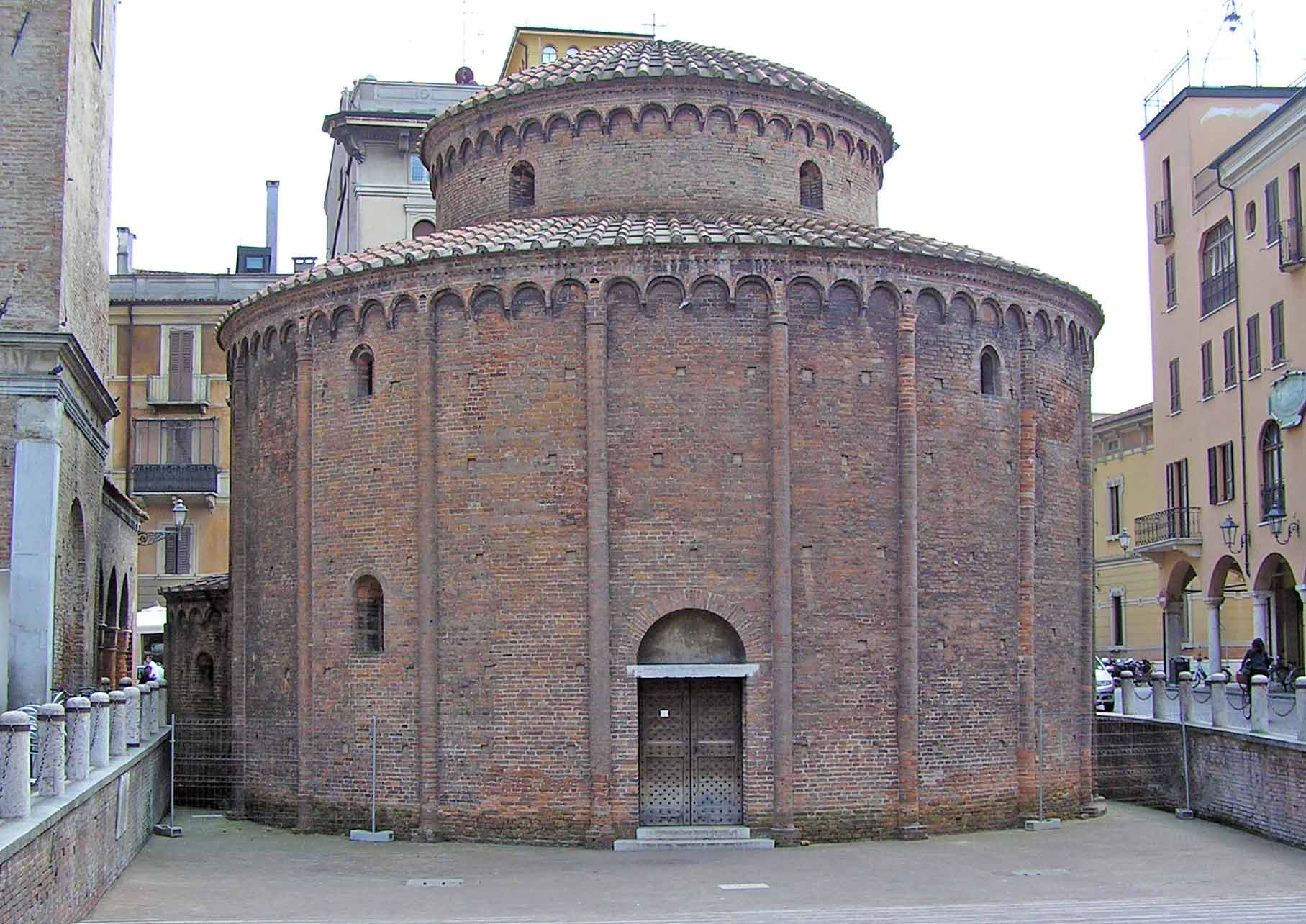
The Rotonda of San Lorenzo.

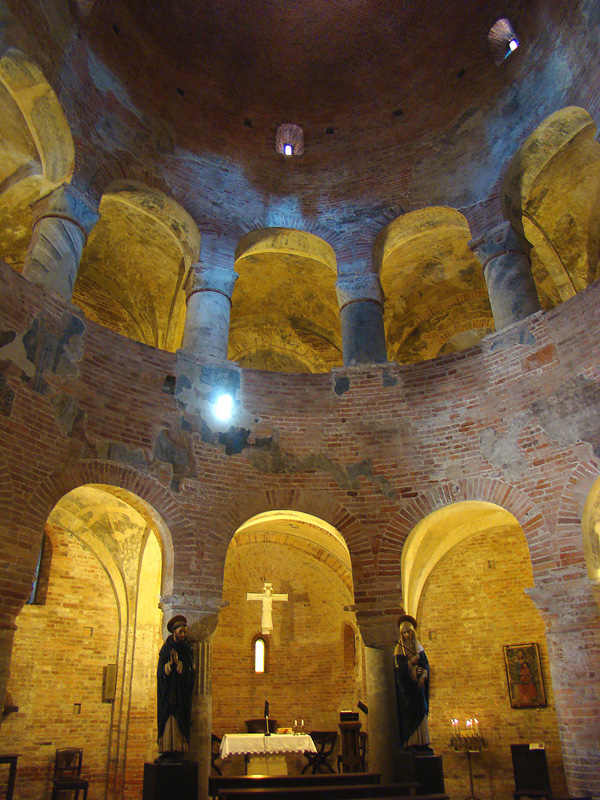
Interior.

The Rotonda di San Lorenzo is a religious building in Mantua, Lombardy (northern Italy).

It is the most ancient church in the city. It is now sunk below the level of the Piazza della Erbe. It probably stands on the site of a Roman temple that was dedicated to the goddess Venus.

It was built during the reign of the Canossa family in the late 11th century. Inspired by the Holy Sepulchre church in Jerusalem and dedicated to the martyr St. Lawrence, it has a central plan and has maintained ancient features like the matronaeum (loggia for female faithful) and frescoes of the Byzantine school from the 11th-12th century. Another fresco fragment in the apse, portraying the Martyrdom of St. Lawrence, dates to the 15th century. The construction, according to the Lombard tradition, is in bricks, but has two columns and other details in marble, coming from ancient edifices.

Deconsecrated, it was used for dwellings, shops and stores, and at the beginning of the 20th century it was covered by other edifices. Later, it was restored and the external additions removed.
