= Torre dell'Orologio, Mantua =

Coordinates: 45°09′30″N 10°47′41″E

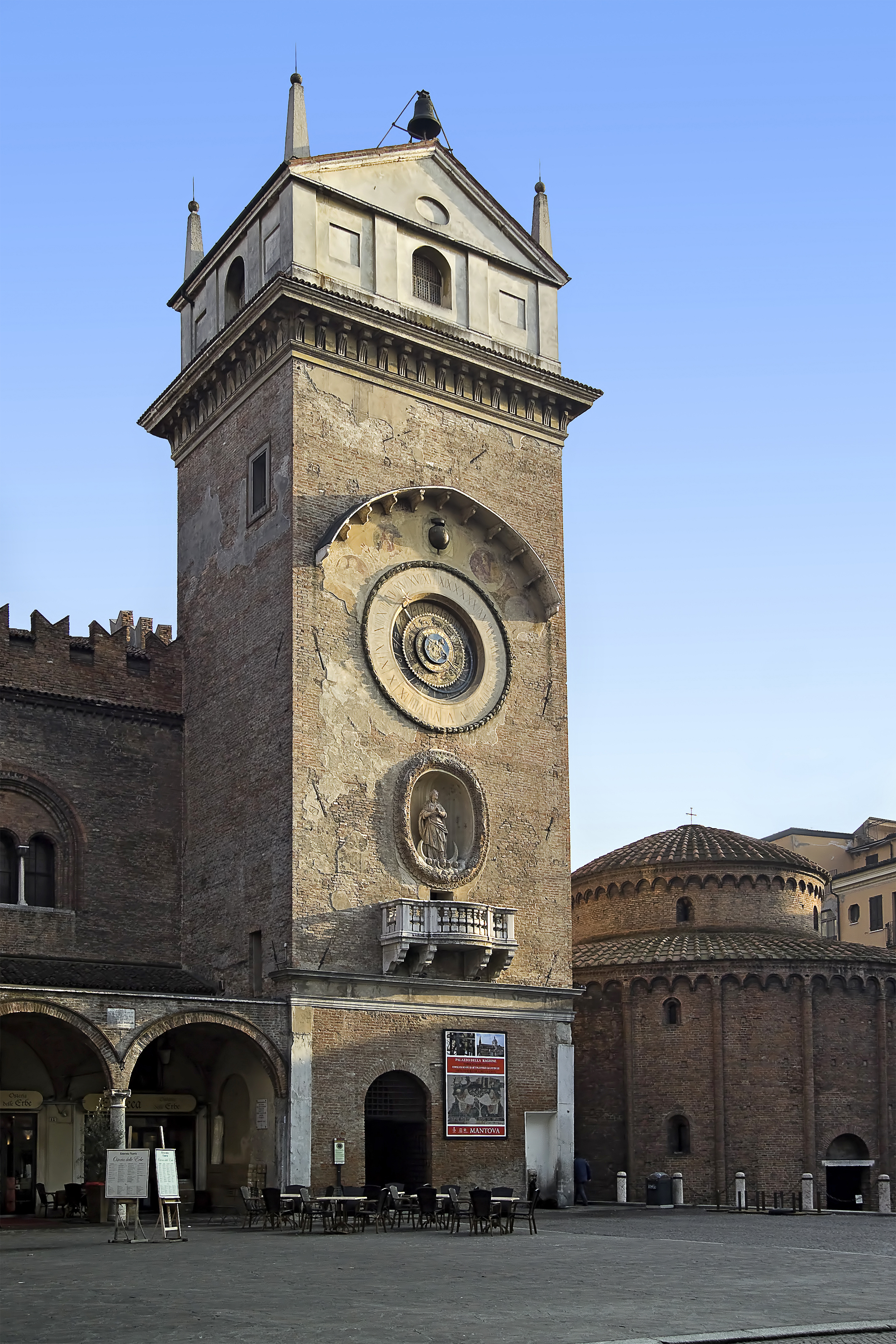
Torre dell'Orologio, Mantua

The Torre dell'Orologio is a 15th-century renaissance tower on the Piazza delle Erbe in Mantua, Italy. It is attached to the Palazzo della Ragione, and next to the Rotonda di San Lorenzo. It houses an astronomical clock.

== History ==
The tower, with a square ground-plan, was constructed in 1472–1473 by Luca Fancelli, a Florentine architect working for Ludovico III Gonzaga, Marquis of Mantua, on the foundations of a previous 13th-century construction. A door at ground floor level gives access to the Palazzo della Ragione.

In 1473 the astronomical clock was installed, the work of Mantuan mathematician Bartolomeo Manfredi. The clock ran without incident for nearly a century, until the mechanism failed in 1560. It was repaired by Francesco Filopono, mathematician and astronomer. It stopped again in 1700. The mechanism was restored in 1989 by Alberto Gorla.

The statue of the Immaculate Madonna under the clock dates from the early 17th century, as does the marble balcony.

The bell above the tower strikes the hours.

The Emilia earthquakes of 2012 damaged the tower, which was closed while repairs were carried out. Within the tower, the Museum of Time exhibits old components of the clock. The top of the tower offers views of the city and the surrounding lakes.

== Astronomical clock ==
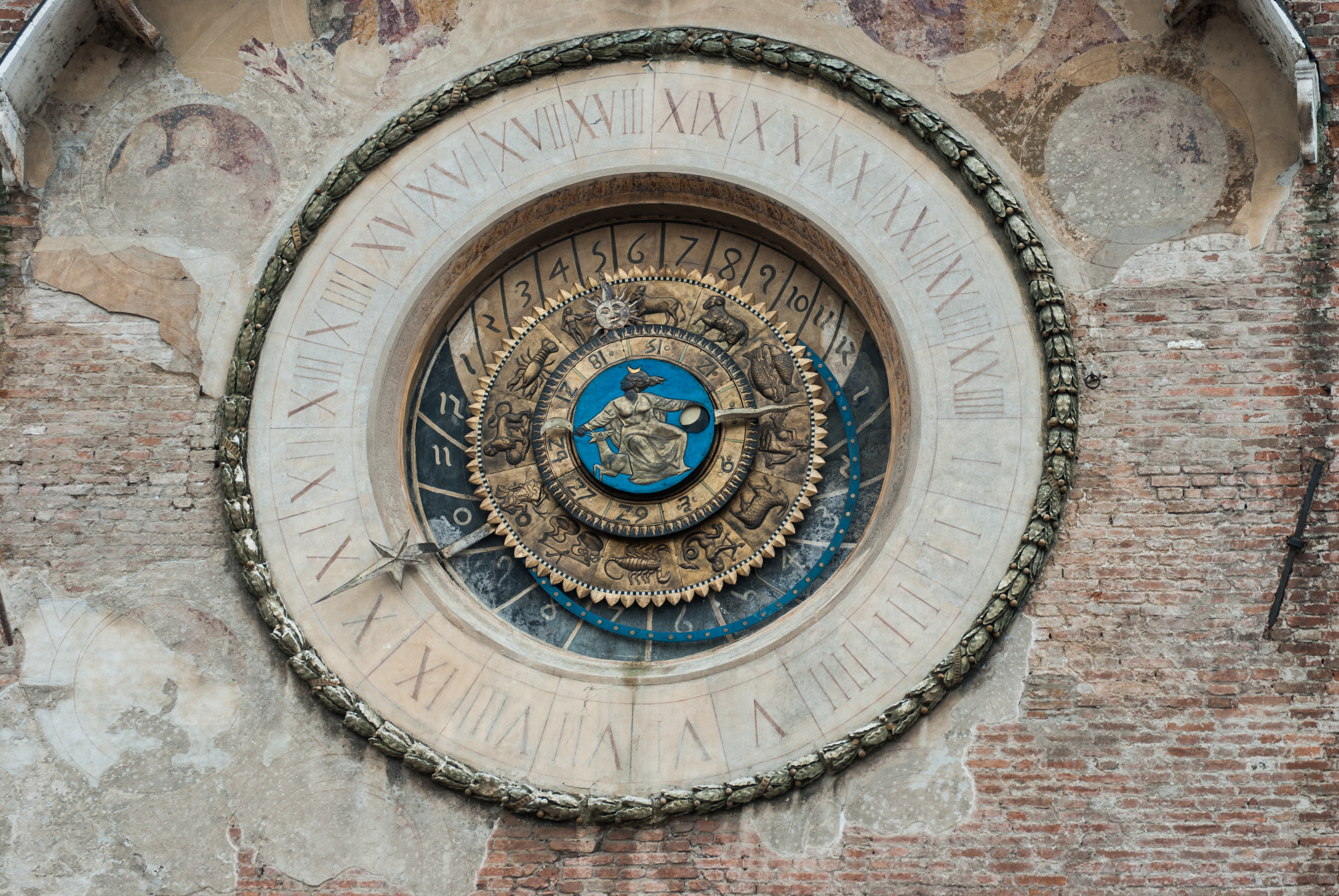
Astronomical clock, Mantua

The clock dial, at a height of approximately 15 metres, is protected by an arched canopy. It was once surrounded by 12 circular frescoes depicting the arts of the quadrivium: as the plasterwork has fallen away, only the four underneath the canopy are now visible. The fresco position at the top of the dial was later replaced by a metallic moon sphere.

The outer ring numbers the hours from I to XXIIII. The next ring, inset, has 24 divisions (12 white and 12 black), representing the unequal hours (with the period of daylight divided into 12 "hours" and the nighttime divided into 12 "hours").

In the centre of the inset is a protruding disc, showing the twelve signs of the zodiac. Inside the zodiac, another overlaid disc, numbered up to 29 in threes, represents the date of the lunar month. At the centre of the dial, the goddess Latona (mother of Apollo and Diana – the Sun and Moon) sits with open arms, a deer at her feet. Her left hand rests on a circular aperture which shows the lunar phase. Outside the aperture, a pointer indicates the Moon's position in the zodiac. Latona's right hand, holding a sickle in the shape of the crescent moon, indicates the date of the lunar month.

The clock's off-centre blue semicircle with thirty golden studs, fixed to the zodiac ring between Libra and Pisces, represents the celestial equator.

The dial has two hands. The longer hand, with a star and pointer, indicates the time. (Traditionally time showed was Italian hours, counting from sunset. Today, for ease of reading, the time shown is from midnight to midnight.) The other hand shows the sun and indicates solar time, permitting calculation of the equation of time, the difference between solar and conventional time.

This semicircle and the lunar indications, in combination with the dial's other indications, enable the calculation of planetary hours, and therefore facilitate astrological predictions.

The clock mechanism is in wrought iron; the mechanism stands on a wooden base.

== Bibliography ==
- Veratti, Bartolomeo (1860). De' matematici italiani anteriori all'invenzione della stampa (in Italian). Modena.
- Ungerer, Alfred (1931). Les Horloges astronomiques et monumentales les plus remarquables de l'Antiquité jusqu'à nos jours (in French). Strasbourg.
- Boriani, Ezio (1969). Castelli e torri dei Gonzaga nel territorio mantovano (in Italian). Brescia.
- Lai, Luciano (June 2002). "L'orologio astronomico di Mantova". L'Astronomia (in Italian). No. 222.
- Signorini, Rodolfo (1989). L'ostensorio sognato: breve guida alla conoscenza del ripristinato orologio pubblico di Mantova (in Italian). Mantua.
