= Marcus Antonius Antimachus =

- Born: c. 1473; Mantua
- Died: 1552; Ferrara
- Occupations: Teacher; translator; poet
- Writing career
- Language: Greek, Neo-Latin

Marcus Antonius Antimachus, also written Mark Antony Antimaco or Marcantonio Antimaco (c. 1473 – 1552), was an Italian who mainly taught and translated Greek.

Antimachus was born in Mantua. His father, who was also educated, sent him to Greece while he was young, where he spent five years studying Greek under a Spartan, John Mosco. He returned to Italy and opened a Greek language school in Mantua, which became well known. He later moved to Ferrara, where he ran a similar school, and where he died in 1552. In addition to teaching, he translated some Greek works, which were published in Basel in 1540, and wrote some Neo-Latin poetry.
