= Mantua =

City in Lombardy, Italy

Mantua Mantova (Italian) Mantua (Lombard)
- Comune
- Comune di Mantova
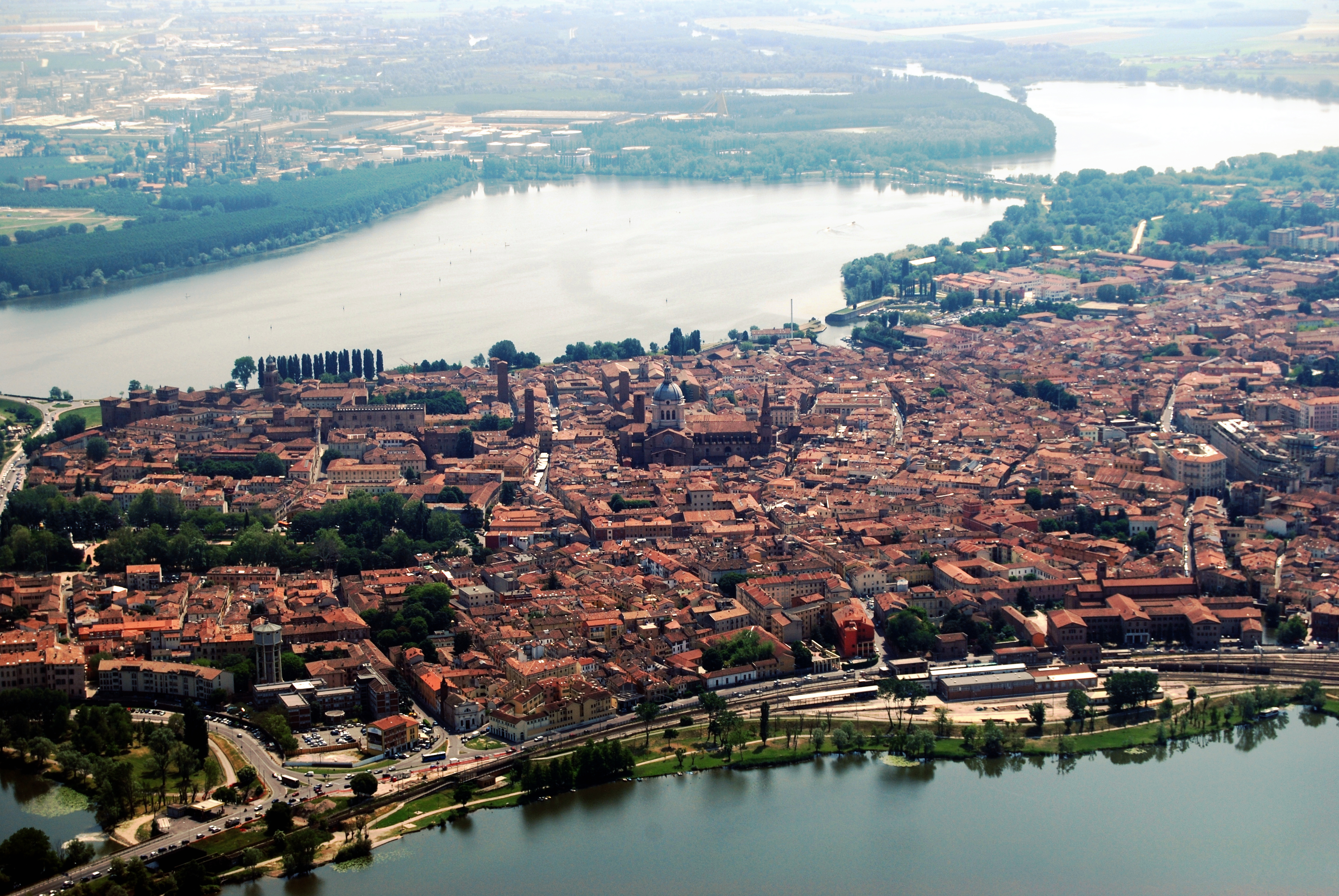
- Panorama of Mantua

- Flag Coat of arms

- Location in the province of Mantua

- Location within Italy Location within Lombardy
- Coordinates: 45°9′23″N 10°47′30″E
- Country: Italy
- Region: Lombardy
- Province: Mantua (MN)
- Frazioni: Castelletto Borgo, Cittadella, Formigosa, Frassino, Gambarara, Lunetta, Virgiliana

Government
  - Mayor: Andrea Murari (PD)

Area
  - Total: 63.81 km^{2} (24.64 sq mi)
- Elevation: 19 m (62 ft)

Population (2026)
  - Total: 50,215
  - Density: 786.9/km^{2} (2,038/sq mi)
- Demonyms: Mantovano (plural: mantovani); Virgiliano (plural: virgiliani)
- Time zone: UTC+1 (CET)
  - Summer (DST): UTC+2 (CEST)
- Postal code: 46100
- Dialing code: 0376
- Patron saint: Saint Anselm
- Saint day: 18 March
- Website: www.comune.mantova.it

Mantua (/ˈmæntju.ə/ MAN-tew-ə; Italian: Mantova [ˈmantova]; Lombard and Latin: Mantua) is a city and comune (municipality) in the region of Lombardy in northern Italy and capital of the eponymous province. It has 50,215 inhabitants.

Mantua is surrounded on three sides by artificial lakes, created during the 12th century as the city's defence system. These lakes receive water from the Mincio river, a tributary of the Po river, which descends from Lake Garda. The three lakes are called Lago Superiore, Lago di Mezzo, and Lago Inferiore ("Upper", "Middle", and "Lower" Lakes, respectively). A fourth lake, Lake Pajolo, which once served as a defensive water ring around the city, dried up at the end of the 18th century.

The area and its environs are important not only in naturalistic terms, but also anthropologically and historically; research has highlighted a number of human settlements scattered between Barche di Solferino and Bande di Cavriana, Castellaro, and Isolone del Mincio. These dated, without interruption, from Neolithic times (5th–4th millennium BC) to the Bronze Age (2nd–1st millennium BC) and the Gallic phases (2nd–1st centuries BC), and ended with Roman residential settlements, which can be traced to the 3rd century AD.

Under the House of Gonzaga in 1328–1708, Mantua became one of the main artistic, cultural, and musical hubs of Northern Italy and Italy as a whole. It was one of the leading courts of Europe of the fifteenth, sixteenth, and early seventeenth centuries. Mantua is noted for its significant role in the history of opera; the city is also known for its architectural treasures and artifacts, elegant palaces, and the medieval and Renaissance cityscape. It is the city where the composer Claudio Monteverdi premiered his opera L'Orfeo in 1607. It is the nearest town to the birthplace of the Roman classical poet Virgil, who is commemorated by a statue at the lakeside park "Piazza Virgiliana".

In 2008, Mantua's centro storico (old town) and the nearby town of Sabbioneta were declared by UNESCO to be a World Heritage Site. In 2016, Mantua was designated as the "Italian Capital of Culture". and in 2017, it was named as the "European Capital of Gastronomy", included in the Eastern Lombardy District (together with the cities of Bergamo, Brescia, and Cremona).

In 2017, Legambiente ranked Mantua as the best Italian city for quality of life and environment.

== History ==
Mantua was an island settlement which was first established about the year 2000 BC on the banks of River Mincio, which flows from Lake Garda to the Adriatic Sea. In the 6th century BC, Mantua was an Etruscan village which, in the Etruscan tradition, was re-founded by Ocnus.

The name may derive from the Etruscan god Mantus. After being conquered by the Cenomani, a Gallic tribe, Mantua was subsequently fought between the first and second Punic Wars against the Romans, who attributed its name to Manto, a daughter of Tiresias. This territory was later populated by veteran soldiers of Augustus. Mantua's most famous ancient citizen is the poet Virgil, or Publius Vergilius Maro (Mantua me genuit), who was born in the year 70 BC at a village near the city which is now known as Virgilio.

=== After the Fall of the Roman Empire ===
After the fall of the Western Roman Empire at the hands of Odoacer in 476 AD, Mantua was, along with the rest of Italy, conquered by the Ostrogoths. It was retaken by the Eastern Roman Empire in the middle of the 6th century following the Gothic War but was subsequently lost again to the Lombards. They were in turn conquered by Charlemagne in 774, thus incorporating Mantua into the Frankish Empire. Partitions of the empire (due to the Franks' use of partible inheritance) in the Treaties of Verdun and Prüm led to Mantua passing to Middle Francia in 843, then the Kingdom of Italy in 855. In 962 Italy was invaded by King Otto I of Germany, and Mantua thus became a vassal of the newly formed Holy Roman Empire.

In the 11th century, Mantua became a possession of Boniface of Canossa, marquis of Tuscany. The last ruler of that family was the countess Matilda of Canossa (d. 1115), who, according to legend, ordered the construction of the precious Rotonda di San Lorenzo (or St. Lawrence's Roundchurch) in 1082. The Rotonda still exists today and was renovated in 2013.

==== Free Imperial City of Mantua ====
After the death of Matilda of Canossa, Mantua became a free commune and strenuously defended itself from the influence of the Holy Roman Empire during the 12th and 13th centuries. In 1198, Alberto Pitentino altered the course of River Mincio, creating what the Mantuans call "the four lakes" to reinforce the city's natural protection. Three of these lakes still remain today and the fourth one, which ran through the centre of town, was reclaimed during the 18th century.

==== Podesteria Rule ====
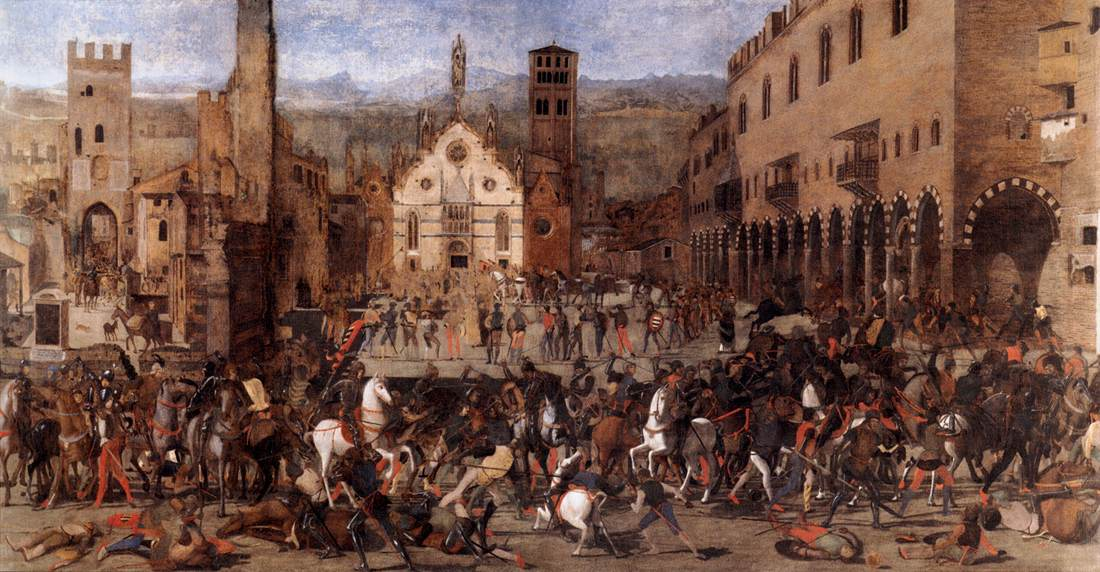
Expulsion of the Bonacolsi in 1328, scene of Piazza Sordello, canvas of Domenico Morone

From 1215, the city was ruled under the podesteria of the Guelph poet-statesman Rambertino Buvalelli.

During the struggle between the Guelphs and the Ghibellines, Pinamonte Bonacolsi took advantage of the chaotic situation to seize power of the podesteria in 1273. He was declared the Captain General of the People. The Bonacolsi family ruled Mantua for the next two generations and made it more prosperous and artistically beautiful. On 16 August 1328 Luigi Gonzaga, an official in Bonacolsi's podesteria, and his family staged a public revolt in Mantua and forced a coup d'état on the last Bonacolsi ruler, Rinaldo.

=== House of Gonzaga ===
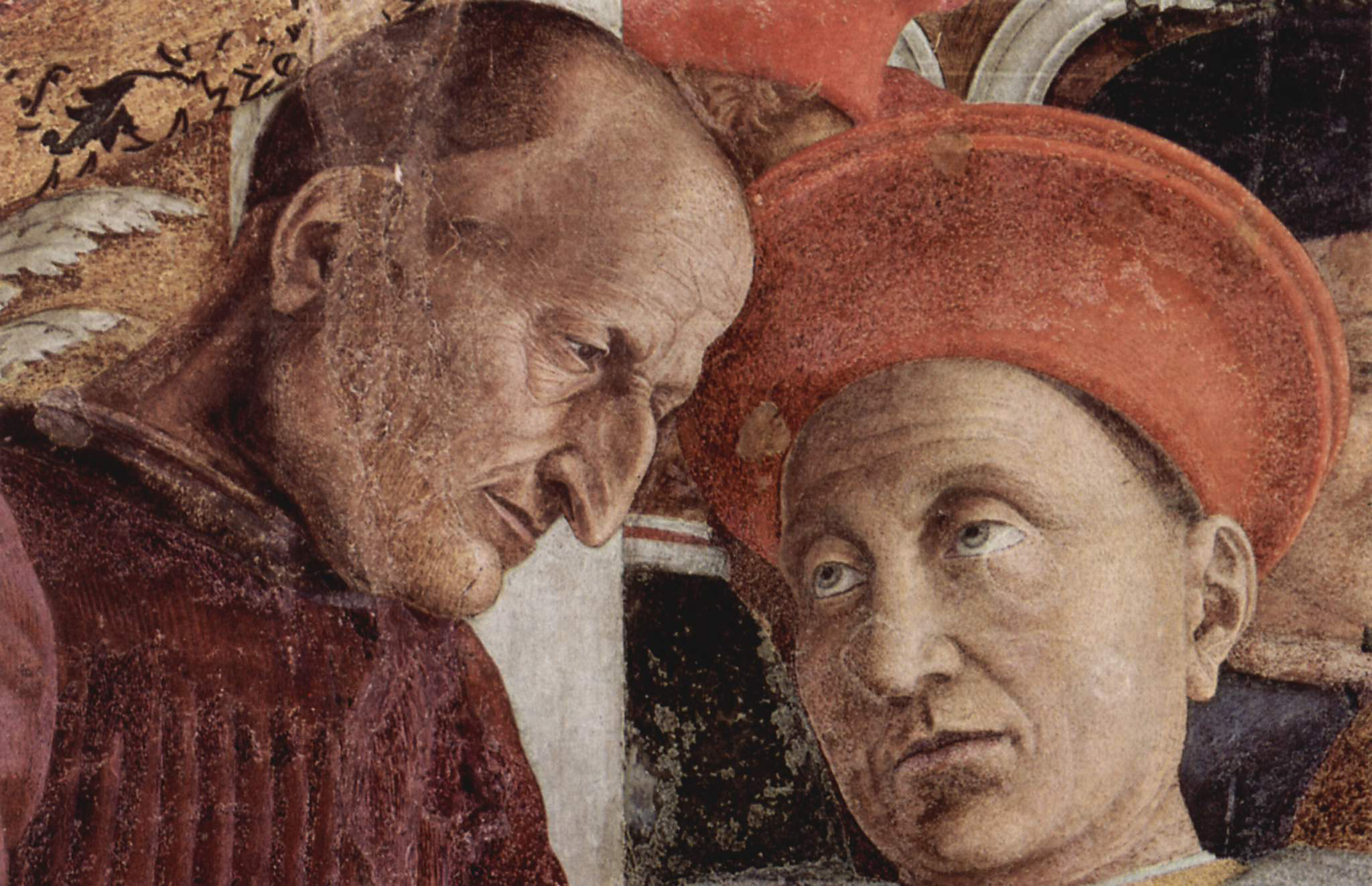
Ludovico III Gonzaga receiving the news of his son Francesco being created a cardinal, fresco by Andrea Mantegna in the Stanza degli Sposi of Palazzo Ducale

Ludovico Gonzaga, who had been Podestà of Mantua since 1318, was duly elected Capitano del popolo. The Gonzagas built new walls with five gates and renovated the city in the 14th century; however, the political situation did not settle until the governance of the third ruler of Gonzaga, Ludovico III Gonzaga, who eliminated his relatives and centralised power to himself. During the Italian Renaissance, the Gonzaga family softened their despotic rule and further raised the level of culture and refinement in Mantua.

Mantua became a significant center of Renaissance art and humanism. Gianfrancesco Gonzaga had brought Vittorino da Feltre to Mantua in 1423 to open his famous humanist school, the Casa Giocosa. Through a payment of 120,000 golden florins in 1433, he was appointed Marquis of Mantua, Gianfrancesco I by the Emperor Sigismund, whose niece Barbara of Brandenburg was married to his son, Ludovico. In 1459, Pope Pius II held the Council of Mantua to proclaim a crusade against the Turks. Under Ludovico and his heirs, the famous Renaissance painter Andrea Mantegna worked in Mantua as court painter, producing some of his most outstanding works.

Isabella d'Este, Marchioness of Mantua, married Francesco II Gonzaga, Marquess of Mantua in 1490. When she moved to Mantua from Ferrara (she was the daughter of Duke Ercole the ruler of Ferrara) she created her famous studiolo firstly in Castello di San Giorgio for which she commissioned paintings from Mantegna, Perugino and Lorenzo Costa. She later moved her studiolo to the Corte Vecchia and commissioned two paintings from Correggio to join the five from Castello di San Giorgio. It was unusual for a woman to have a studiolo in 15th century Italy given they were regarded as masculine spaces. Isabella was a vociferous collector and such was her reputation that Niccolò da Corregio called her 'la prima donna del mondo'.

==== Duchy of Mantua ====
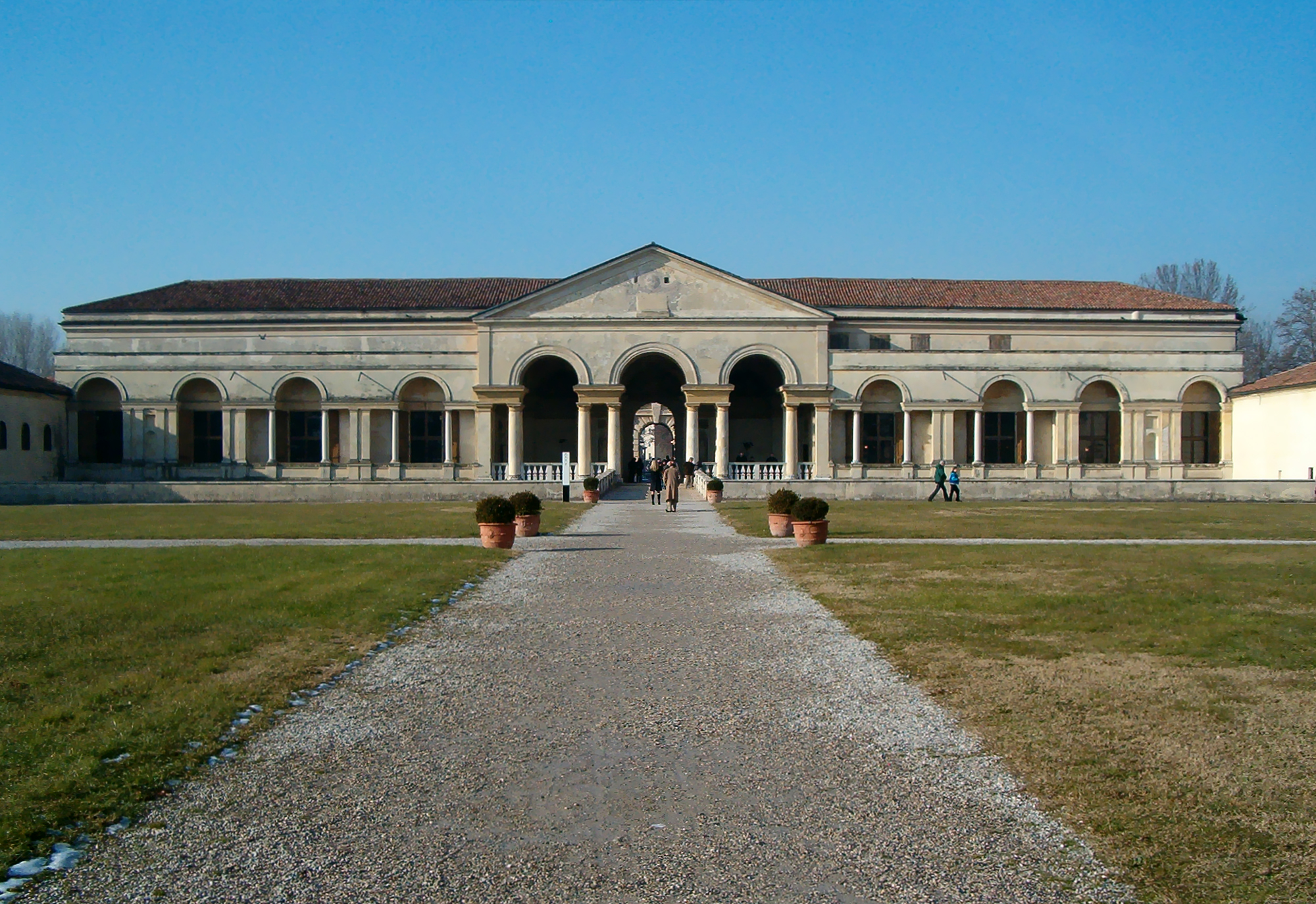
Palazzo Te

The first Duke of Mantua was Federico II Gonzaga, who acquired the title from the Holy Roman Emperor Charles V in 1530. Federico commissioned Giulio Romano to build the famous Palazzo Te, on the periphery of the city, and profoundly improved the city. In the late 16th century, Claudio Monteverdi came to Mantua from his native Cremona. He worked for the court of Vincenzo I Gonzaga, first as a singer and violist, then as music director, marrying the court singer Claudia Cattaneo in 1599.

=== From Gonzaga to Habsburg ===
In 1627, the direct line of the Gonzaga family came to an end with the vicious and weak Vincenzo II, and Mantua slowly declined under the new rulers, the Gonzaga-Nevers, a cadet French branch of the family. The War of the Mantuan Succession broke out, and in 1630 an Imperial army of 36,000 mercenaries under Matthias Gallas and Johann von Aldringen besieged and sacked Mantua, bringing the plague with them. Ferdinand Carlo IV, an inept ruler, whose only interest was in holding parties and theatrical shows, allied with France in the War of the Spanish Succession. After the French defeat, he took refuge in Venice and carried with him a thousand pictures. At his death in 1708, the Duke of Mantua was declared deposed and his family of Gonzaga lost Mantua forever in favour of the Habsburgs of Austria.

Under Austrian rule, Mantua enjoyed a revival and during this period the Royal Academy of Sciences, Letters and Arts, the Scientific Theatre, and numerous palaces were built.

==== Napoleonic Wars ====
In 1786, ten years before Napoleon Bonaparte's campaign in Italy, the Austrian Duchy of Mantua briefly united with the Duchy of Milan until 1791.

On 4 June 1796 during the War of the First Coalition, Mantua was besieged by Napoleon Bonaparte's French army. The first Austrian attempt to break the siege was successful and the siege was abandoned on 1 August. The Austrian army was defeated at the Battle of Castiglione on 5 August and left the area. The French resumed the siege on August 27 and accepted surrender of the city on 2 February 1797. The city was recaptured by the Austrians in the War of the Second Coalition after a siege lasting from 8 April to 28 July 1799.

Later, the city again passed into Napoleon's control and became a part of Napoleon's Kingdom of Italy. In 1810 Andreas Hofer was shot by Porta Giulia, a gate of the town at Borgo di Porto (Cittadella) for leading the insurrection in the County of Tyrol against Napoleon.

==== Kingdom of Lombardy–Venetia ====
After the brief period of French rule, Mantua returned to Austria in 1814, becoming one of the Quadrilatero fortress cities in northern Italy. Under the Congress of Vienna (1815), Mantua became a province in the Austrian Empire's Kingdom of Lombardy–Venetia. Agitation against Austria, however, culminated in a revolt which lasted from 1851 to 1855, but it was finally suppressed by the Austrian army. One of the most famous episodes of the Italian Risorgimento took place in the valley of the Belfiore, where a group of rebels was hanged by the Austrians.

=== Unification of Italy ===
At the Battle of Solferino (Second Italian War of Independence) in 1859, the House of Savoy's Piedmont-Sardinia sided with the French Emperor Napoleon III against the Austrian Empire. Following Austria's defeat, Lombardy was ceded to France, who transferred Lombardy to Piedmont-Sardinia in return for Nice and Savoy.

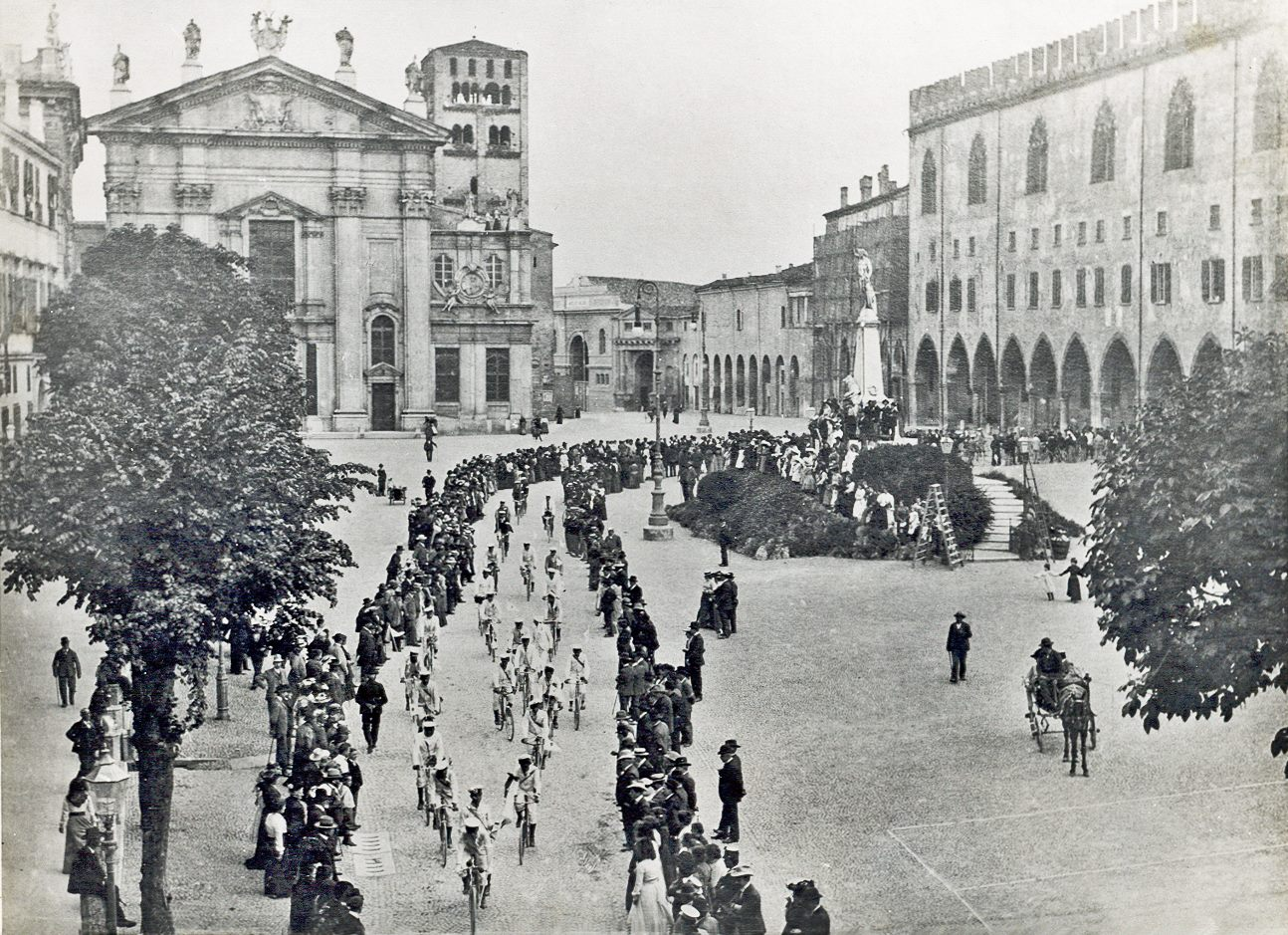
Mantua in 1887

Mantua, although a constituent province of Lombardy, still remained under the Austrian Empire along with Venetia. In 1866, Prussia-led North German Confederation sided with the newly established, Piedmont-led Kingdom of Italy against the Austrian Empire in the Third Italian War of Independence. The quick defeat of Austria led to its withdrawal of the Kingdom of Venetia (including the capital city, Venice). Mantua reconnected with the region of Lombardy and was incorporated into the Kingdom of Italy.

=== 20th century ===
During World War II, in November 1943, Nazi Germany relocated the Stalag 337 prisoner-of-war camp from Leśna in German-occupied Poland to Mantua. The camp was dissolved in February 1944, and in April 1944 the Dulag 339 transit camp for British, Italian, American, French, Greek and Yugoslav POWs was established in its place, and remained operational until April 1945.

=== 21st century ===
In 2007 the remains of two people, known as the Lovers of Valdaro, were discovered during the construction of a factory. The remains are thought to be between 5,000 and 6,000 years old. It is speculated that the remains are of two young lovers because the two skeletons appear to be embracing.

== Geography ==
Mantua lies in the east of the region of Lombardy, halfway between Milan and Venice, on the River Mincio. It is south of Verona, east of Cremona, north-east of Parma, northwest of Ferrara, and west-southwest of Padua.

=== Climate ===
Climate data for Mantua (1994–2017 normals, extreme 1828–present)
Month	Jan	Feb	Mar	Apr	May	Jun	Jul	Aug	Sep	Oct	Nov	Dec	Year
Record high °C (°F)	18.5 (65.3)	23.6 (74.5)	27.4 (81.3)	31.7 (89.1)	35.2 (95.4)	40.0 (104.0)	40.0 (104.0)	39.8 (103.6)	35.4 (95.7)	31.2 (88.2)	22.4 (72.3)	17.9 (64.2)	40.0 (104.0)
Mean daily maximum °C (°F)	6.1 (43.0)	9.3 (48.7)	14.7 (58.5)	18.8 (65.8)	23.9 (75.0)	28.1 (82.6)	30.3 (86.5)	30.0 (86.0)	24.9 (76.8)	18.8 (65.8)	11.8 (53.2)	6.6 (43.9)	18.6 (65.5)
Daily mean °C (°F)	3.0 (37.4)	5.1 (41.2)	9.4 (48.9)	13.6 (56.5)	18.5 (65.3)	22.5 (72.5)	24.6 (76.3)	24.2 (75.6)	19.7 (67.5)	14.6 (58.3)	8.8 (47.8)	3.9 (39.0)	14.0 (57.2)
Mean daily minimum °C (°F)	0.0 (32.0)	0.8 (33.4)	4.1 (39.4)	8.4 (47.1)	13.2 (55.8)	16.9 (62.4)	18.9 (66.0)	18.4 (65.1)	14.4 (57.9)	10.5 (50.9)	5.7 (42.3)	1.3 (34.3)	9.4 (48.9)
Record low °C (°F)	−16.8 (1.8)	−19.0 (−2.2)	−7.3 (18.9)	−1.4 (29.5)	1.6 (34.9)	7.1 (44.8)	10.5 (50.9)	9.0 (48.2)	6.0 (42.8)	−2.0 (28.4)	−6.3 (20.7)	−13.6 (7.5)	−19.0 (−2.2)
Average precipitation mm (inches)	49 (1.9)	45 (1.8)	46 (1.8)	56 (2.2)	68 (2.7)	58 (2.3)	47 (1.9)	58 (2.3)	59 (2.3)	69 (2.7)	72 (2.8)	56 (2.2)	683 (26.9)
Average precipitation days (≥ 1.0 mm)	6	6	7	8	9	7	5	5	6	7	8	7	81
Source 1: Climi e viaggi
Source 2: Istituto Superiore per la Protezione e la Ricerca Ambientale (precipitation 1951–1980) Temperature estreme in Toscana (extremes)

== Demographics ==
Historical population
Year	Pop.	±%
1871	33,783	—
1881	35,727	+5.8%
1901	36,449	+2.0%
1911	39,560	+8.5%
1921	43,879	+10.9%
1931	47,840	+9.0%
1936	46,620	−2.6%
1951	53,810	+15.4%
1961	62,411	+16.0%
1971	65,703	+5.3%
1981	60,866	−7.4%
1991	53,065	−12.8%
2001	47,790	−9.9%
2011	46,649	−2.4%
2021	48,441	+3.8%
Source: ISTAT

As of 2026, the population is 50,215, of which 48.1% are males, and 51.9% are females. Minors make up 13.6% of the population, and seniors make up 26.3%.

=== Immigration ===
As of 2025, immigrants make up 21.0% of the population. The 5 largest foreign countries of birth are Brazil, Morocco, Albania, Ukraine, and Romania.

== Government ==
Since local government political reorganization in 1993, Mantua has been governed by the City Council of Mantua. Voters elect directly 33 councilors and the mayor of Mantua every five years. The mayor appoints an executive board (giunta), made up of members of the council (assessori), that aids the mayor in his work. The current mayor of Mantua is Andrea Murari (PD), elected on 26 May 2026.

Citywide law enforcement is primarily the responsibility of the Mantua City Police Department. The department is headed by a police chief, appointed by the mayor.

Fire and EMS services are primarily provided by the Mantua City Fire Department, headed by a mayor-appointed fire chief.

== Sights ==
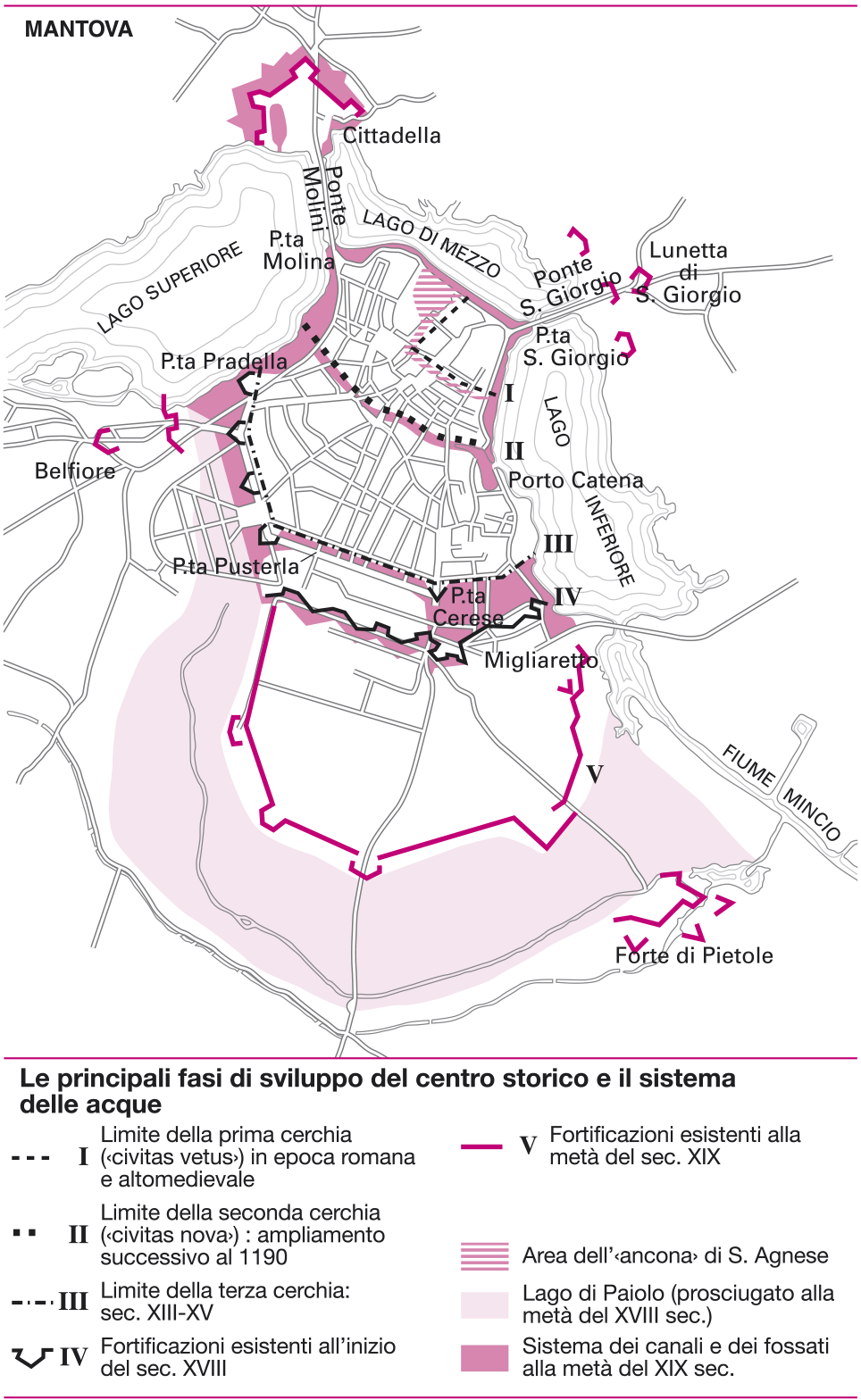
Map of the main stages of development of the historic centre and the water system of Mantua

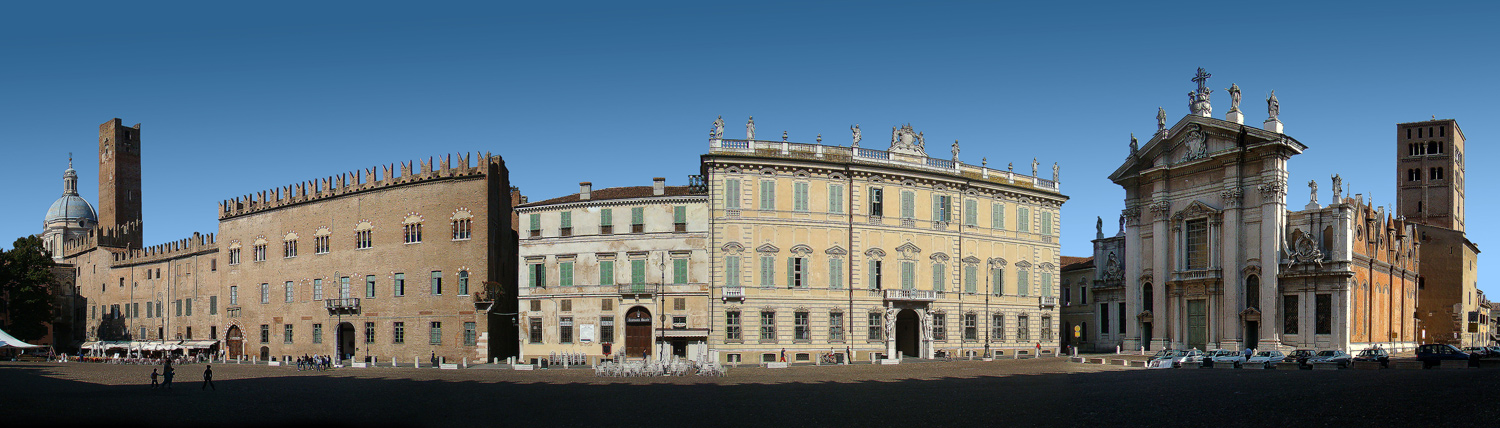
Piazza Sordello

Mantua
UNESCO World Heritage Site
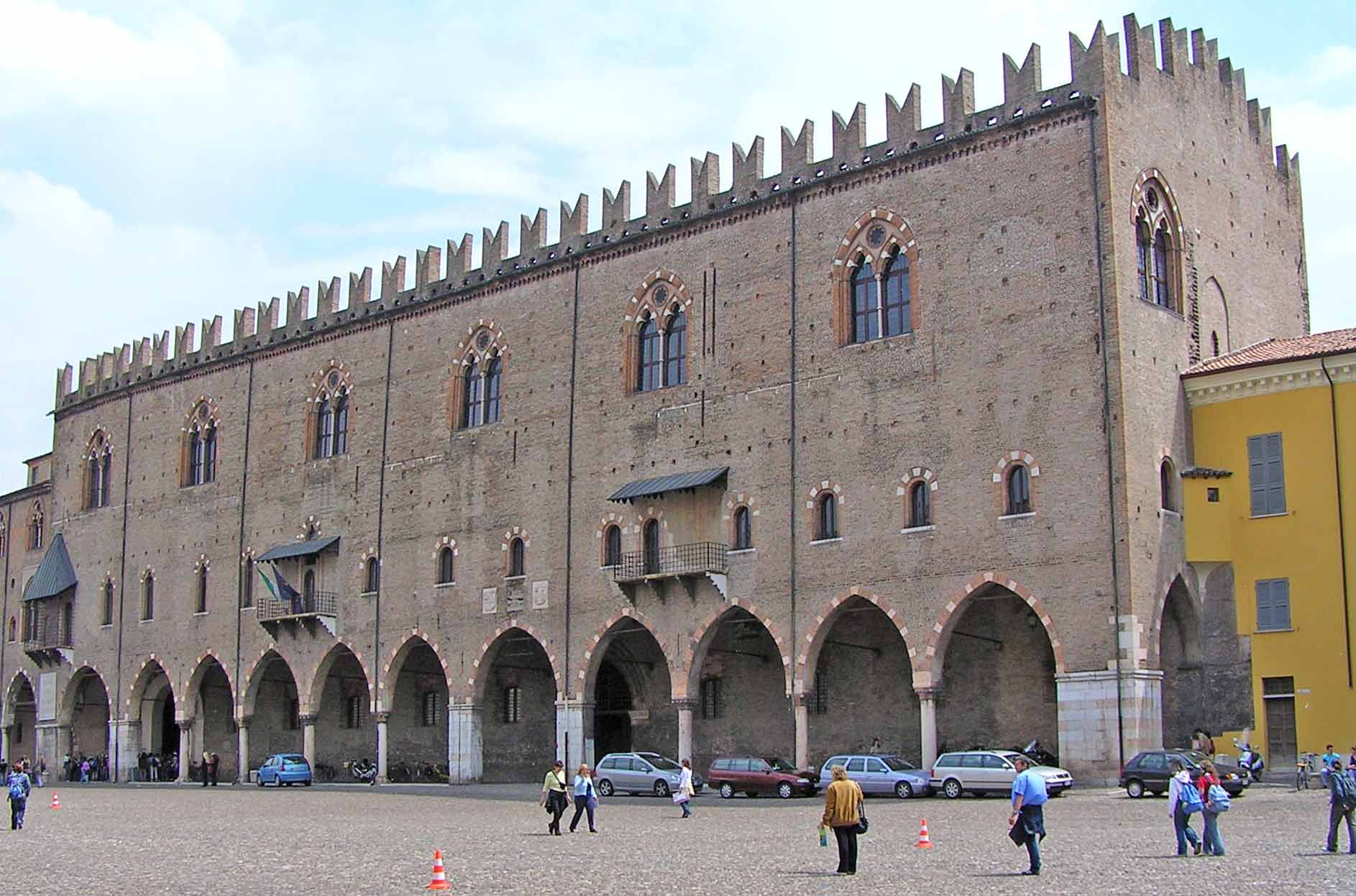
- Interactive map of Mantua
- Part of: Mantua and Sabbioneta
- Criteria: Cultural: ii, iii
- Reference: 1287-001
- Inscription: 2008 (32nd Session)
- Area: 175 ha (430 acres)
- Buffer zone: 1,900 ha (4,700 acres)

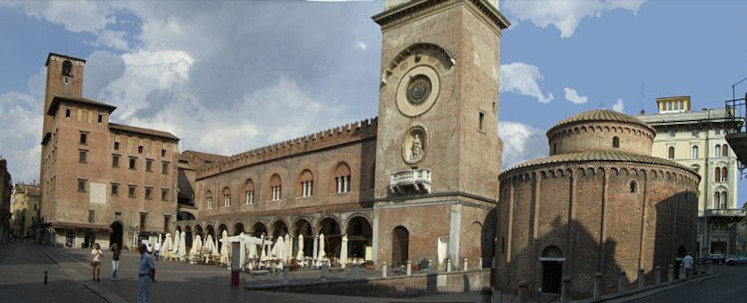
Piazza delle Erbe

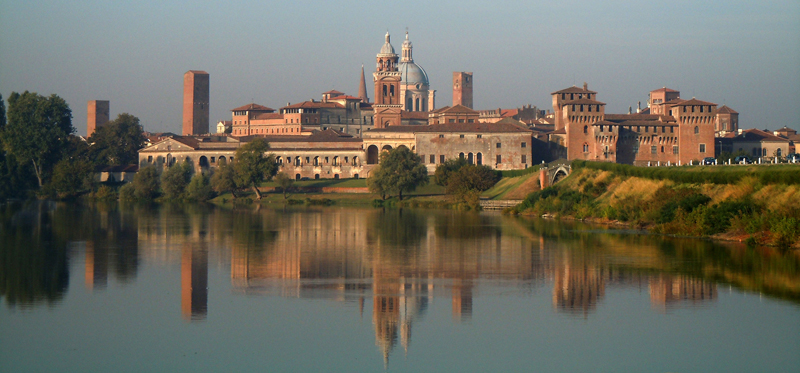
Panorama of Mantua

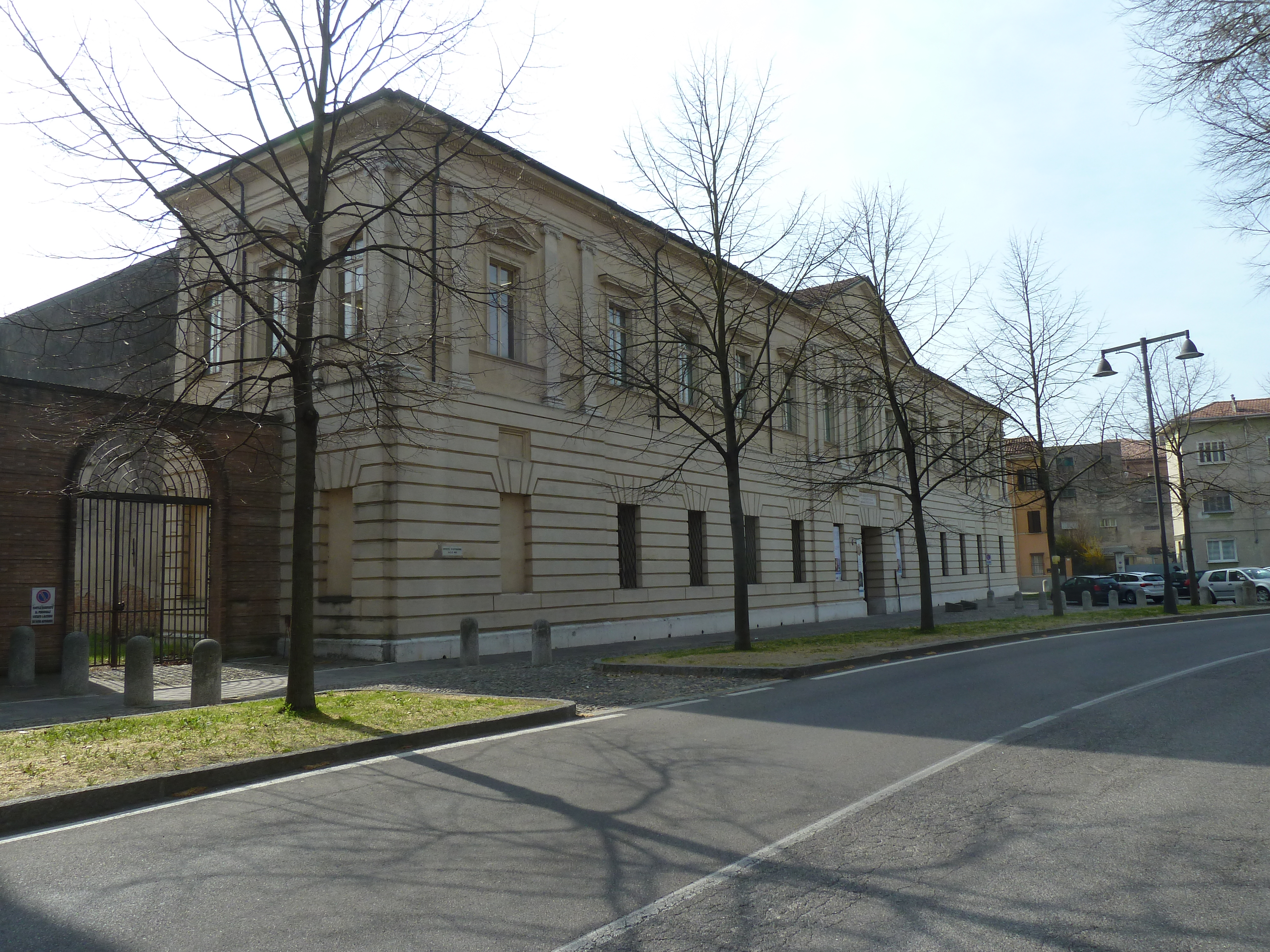
Museum Francesco Gonzaga

The Gonzagas protected the arts and culture, and were hosts to several important artists such as Leone Battista Alberti, Andrea Mantegna, Giulio Romano, Donatello, Peter Paul Rubens, Pisanello, Domenico Fetti, Luca Fancelli, and Nicolò Sebregondi. Though many of the masterworks have been dispersed, the cultural value of Mantua is nonetheless outstanding, with many of Mantua's patrician and ecclesiastical buildings being uniquely important examples of Italian architecture.

=== Religious architecture and sites ===
- Basilica of Sant'Andrea was begun in 1462 according to designs by Leon Battista Alberti but was finished only in the 18th century when the massive dome designed by Filippo Juvarra was built.
- Duomo (Cathedral of St Peter the Apostle)
- Rotonda di San Lorenzo
- Church of San Sebastiano
- Museo diocesano Francesco Gonzaga, art museum displaying sacred artworks, armor, coins, tapestries, pottery, ancient and contemporary paintings.
- Santa Paola, church built in the early 15th century by the will of Marchioness Paola Malatesta, wife of Francesco I. Architects such as Luca Fancelli and Giulio Romano collaborated to its construction. It houses the tombs of five members of the Gonzaga family, including those of Paola and of Francesco II.
- Santa Maria del Gradaro, church built starting from 1256 on the site where, according to the tradition, Saint Longinus was buried. In 1772 it became a store, and was reconsecrated only in the 1950s.

=== Secular architecture and sites ===
- Palazzo Te (1525–1535), semi-rural palace of Giulio Romano (who lived in Mantua in his final years) in the mature Renaissance style, with some hints of a post-Raphaelian mannerism. It was the summer residential villa of Frederick II of Gonzaga. It hosts the Museo Civico (with the donations of Arnoldo Mondadori, one of the most important Italian publishers, and Ugo Sissa, a Mantuan architect who worked in Iraq from where he brought back important Mesopotamian artworks).
- Palazzo Ducale, famous residence of the Gonzaga family, composed of a number of buildings, courtyards and gardens gathered around the Palazzo del Capitano, the Magna Domus and the Castle of St. George with the Camera degli Sposi, a room frescoed by Andrea Mantegna.
- Palazzo Vescovile ("Bishops Palace")
- Palazzo degli Uberti
- Palazzo d'Arco, a Neoclassical palace erected by the eponymous noble family from Trento starting from 1746. It is home to a museum and painting gallery with works by Bernardino Luini, Alessandro Magnasco, Frans Pourbus the Younger, Anthony van Dyck and a painting cycle by Giuseppe Bazzani.
- Torre della Gabbia ("Cage Tower")
- Palazzo del Podestà, Mantua
- Palazzo della Ragione with the Torre dell'Orologio
- Palazzo Bonacolsi
- Palazzo Valenti Gonzaga, an example of Baroque architecture and decoration, with frescoes attributed to Flemish painter Frans Geffels. The façade of the palace was designed by Nicolò Sebregondi.
- Bibiena Theater, also known as the Teatro Scientifico, designed by Antonio Bibiena in 1767–1769. Inaugurated officially on 3 December 1769 and on 16 January 1770, thirteen-year-old Wolfgang Amadeus Mozart played a concert.
- Casa del Mercato, a frescoed Renaissance building designed by Luca Fancelli in 1462 and later used by Andrea Mantegna.
- House of Mantegna, facing the church of San Sebastiano. It was built by the eponymous artist starting from 1476, and has plan with a circular internal court included within an external square building. It is now used for temporary exhibitions.

== Transport ==
=== Car ===
By car, Mantova can be reached on the A4 (Milan-Venice) Highway up to Verona, then the A22 (Brennero-Modena) Highway. Alternatively, the city can be reached from Milan on the State Road 415 (Milan-Cremona) to Cremona and from there State Road 10 (Cremona-Mantova), or from Verona on the State Road 62.

=== Railway ===
Mantua railway station, opened in 1873, lies on the railway lines of Milan-Codogno-Cremona-Mantua and Verona-Mantua-Modena. The station is a terminus for three regional lines, to Cremona and Milan, to Monselice, and to Verona Porta Nuova and Modena. Trenitalia operates a daily high-speed connection with Rome.

=== Air ===
The closest airport is Verona Villafranca Airport. A direct shuttle bus service running to and from Mantua railway station was cancelled on 1 January 2015. Public transport connections are now provided by the airport bus running to and from Verona Porta Nuova railway station and the Verona-Mantua railway line.

=== Bus ===
Local bus services, urbano (within the city area and suburbs) and interurbano (within the surrounding towns and villages) are provided by APAM (Azienda Pubblici Autoservizi Mantova).

== In popular culture ==
- In William Shakespeare's Romeo and Juliet, Romeo is punished for killing Tybalt: he is exiled from Verona to Mantua. The plan is for both Romeo and Juliet to escape Verona after Juliet wakes up from her fake death, but that never happens, because Romeo dies, and she stabs herself to death.
- In William Shakespeare's play The Taming of the Shrew, the schoolmaster who pretends to be Lucentio's father, Vincentio, is from Mantua. Hortensio is presented as "Licio, born in Mantua". Another character simply named "Pedant" states that he is from Mantua.
- Giuseppe Verdi's opera Rigoletto (based on Victor Hugo's play Le roi s'amuse) is set in Mantua. Austro-Hungarian authorities in Venice forced him to move the action from France to Mantua. A medieval building with portico and 15th-century loggia in Mantua is said to be "Rigoletto's house". It was actually the house of the cathedral regulars. It was chosen by the Gonzaga family as the residence of the legendary fool who was then used by Verdi in his opera.
- Netflix's Italian mini-series The Trial (Italian: Il processo), released in Italy in 2019, was primarily filmed in Mantua. It was directed by Stefano Lodovichi, and was created by Alessandro Fabbri, in collaboration with Laura Colella and Enrico Audenino. It is the fictional story of the challenges faced by a local prosecutor as she takes up a murder case involving a local wealthy woman.
- In Virgil's Aeneid the poet includes a catalogue of Etruscan warriors in book 10. Virgil speaks directly to Mantua saying how Ocnus gave Mantua its walls and the name of his mother. Virgil also describes how the Mantuan army is at the head of the larger group of armies in this moment. It is a clear cameo which Virgil aimed to find his way into his epic poem.

== International relations ==
=== Twin towns – sister cities ===
Mantua is twinned with:

- Charleville-Mézières, France, since 1959
- Nevers, France, since 1959
- Pushkin, Russia, since 1993
- Weingarten, Germany, since 1998
- (United States) Madison, U.S., since 2001
- Ōmihachiman, Japan, since 2005
- Oradea, Romania, since 2005

== Notable people ==
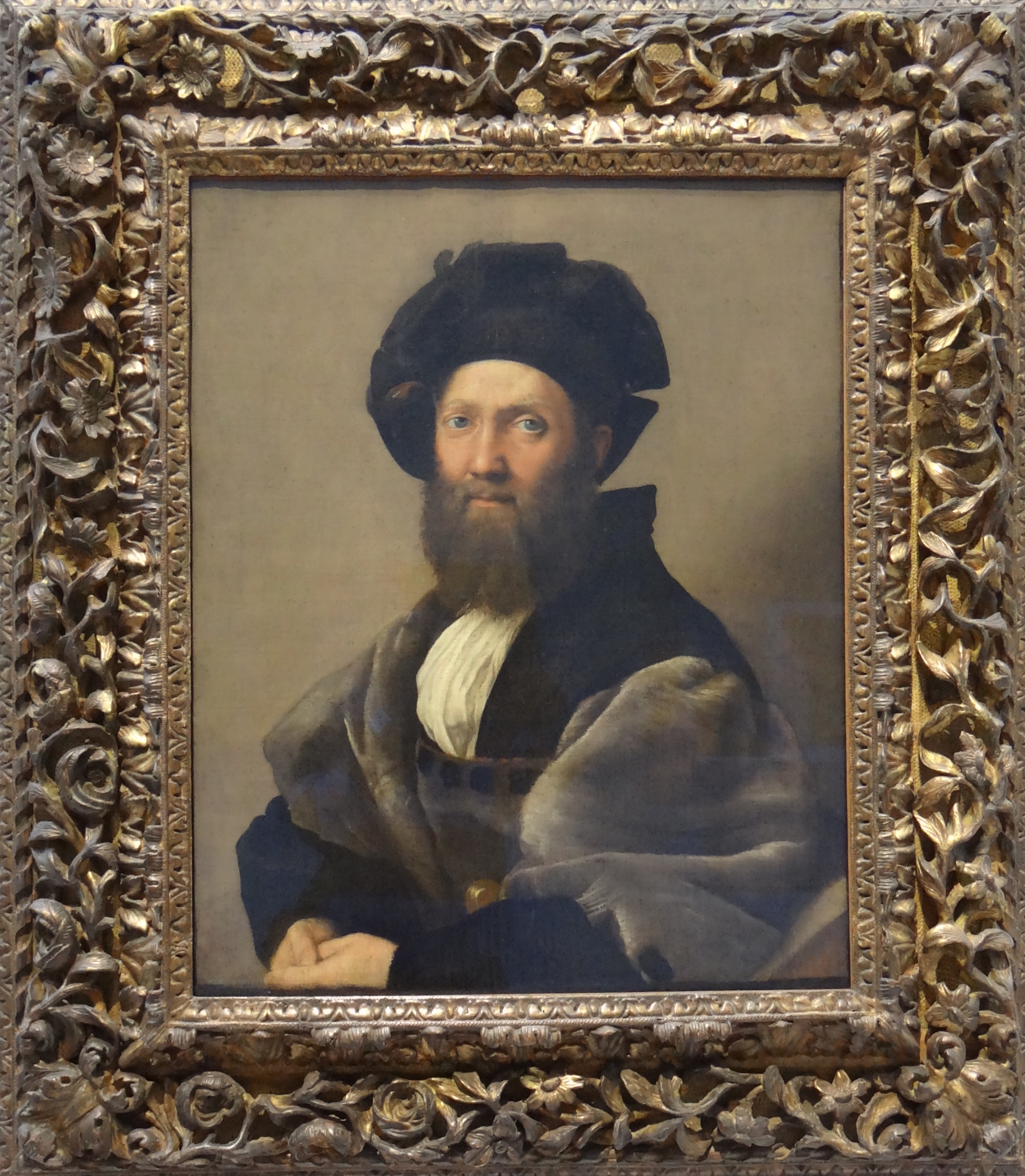
Baldassare Castiglione by Raphael at Louvre-Lens

Tazio Nuvolari, 1932

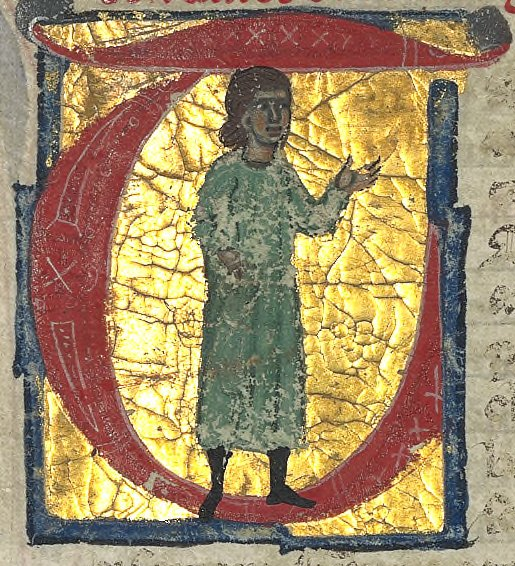
Sordello

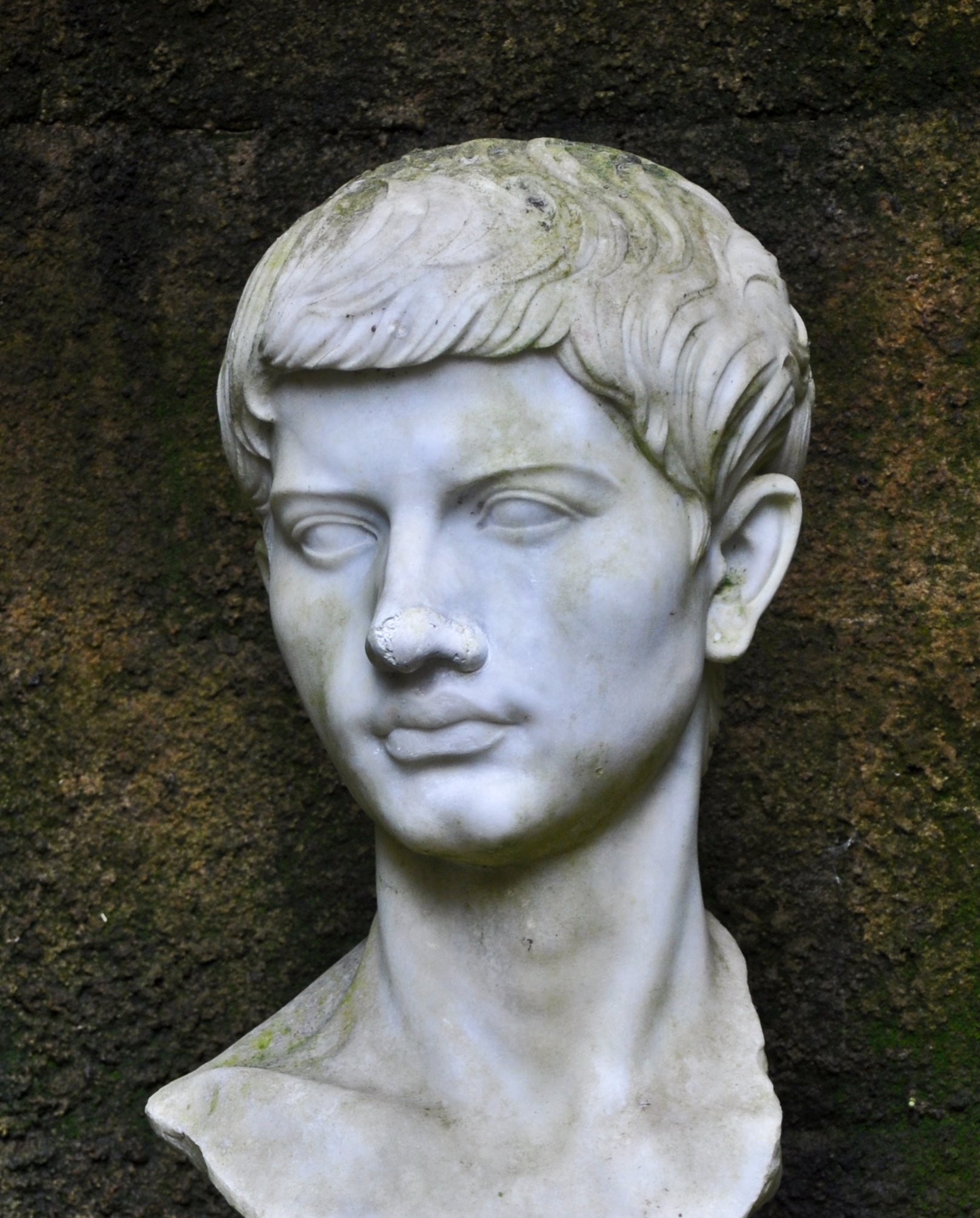
Virgil

- Andrea Andreani (1540–1623), engraver on wood. He used chiaroscuro.
- Marcus Antonius Antimachus (c. 1473 – 1552), pioneer of Renaissance Greek language teaching
- Luigi Antoldi (died 1878), engraver
- Solomon Aviad Sar-Shalom Basilea (c. 1680 – 1743), rabbi and writer
- Mariam Battistelli, operatic soprano and actress
- Giovanni Battista Bertani (1516–1576), architect
- Giacomo Benefatti (1304–1332), Roman Catholic Bishop
- Constanzo Beschi (1680–1742), a well known Tamil poet. He is known as Vīramāmunivar in Tamil.
- Saverio Bettinelli (1718–1808), Jesuit writer, polymath, dramatist, polemicist, poet, and literary critic
- Judah Brieli (1643–1722), rabbi
- Baldassare Castiglione (1478–1529), count of Casatico, courtier, diplomat, soldier and author
- Gino Fano (1871–1952), mathematician
- Matteo Cressoni (born 1984), racing driver
- Federigo Giambelli (16th & 17th centuries), military and civil engineer. He worked in Spain.
- St. Aloysius Gonzaga (1568–1591), aristocrat and Jesuit
- Pietro Giovanni Guarneri (1655–1720), violin maker of the Guarneri family. He left Cremona in 1679, eventually establishing himself in Mantua.
- Learco Guerra (1902–1963), professional road racing cyclist. In 1931 he won the world cycling championship.
- Alfredo Guzzoni (1877–1965), Italian Army General in World War II
- Alberto Jori (born 1965), neo-aristotelian philosopher
- Lovers of Valdaro, a pair of human skeletons dated approx 6,000 years old
- Claudio Monteverdi (c. 1567 – 1643), composer and violist to the duke of Mantua
- Marzio Moretti (born 2002), racing driver
- Tazio Nuvolari (1892–1953), motorcycle and racecar driver
- Ippolito Nievo (1831–1861), writer, journalist and patriot
- Elisabetta Picenardi (1428–1468), Italian Roman Catholic, Servite Order professed member
- Dave Rodgers (born 1963), musician and singer
- Jean-Louis Preti (1798–1881), musician and chess writer
- Pietro Pomponazzi (1462–1525), Italian philosopher. He is sometimes known by his Latin name, Petrus Pomponatius.
- Samuel Romanelli (1757–1814), Jewish intellectual and travel writer who published the first modern ethnography of Moroccan Jewry
- Salamone Rossi (c. 1570 – 1630), Jewish violinist and composer who served as concertmaster of the Mantua court from 1587 until 1628
- Giuseppe Sarto (1835–1914), appointed Bishop in 1884, before he became Pope Pius X in 1903
- Stefano Scarampella (1843–1925), violin maker. He left Brescia and moved to Mantua in 1886.
- Ada Sacchi Simonetta (1874–1944), librarian and women's rights activist
- Leone de' Sommi (c. 1525 – c. 1590), theater director and writer
- Sordello or Sordel, a 13th-century Lombard troubadour, born in the municipality of Goito in the province of Mantua
- Franca Sozzani (1950–2016), editor-in-chief at Vogue Italia
- Virgil (70 BCE – 19 BCE), a classical Roman poet, born near Mantua

== See also ==
- Roman Catholic Diocese of Mantova
- Rocca di Manerba del Garda (Lombardy)
- Mantua–Asola Tramway
- Guido Torelli
