= Luca Fancelli =

Luca Fancelli (c. 1430 – c. 1502) was an Italian architect and sculptor.

== Biography ==
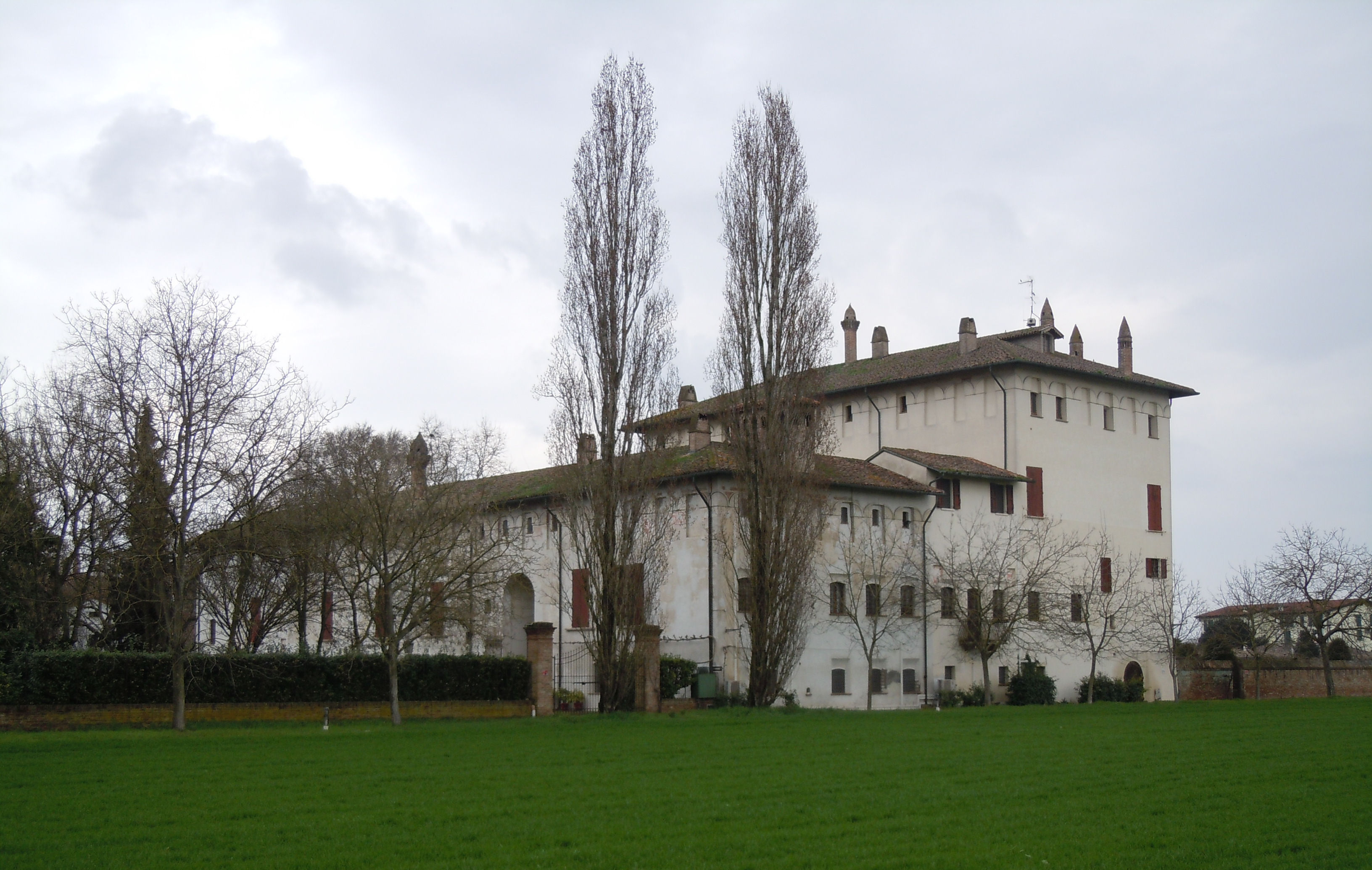
Corte Ghirardina, Motteggiana, constructed by Luca Fancelli.

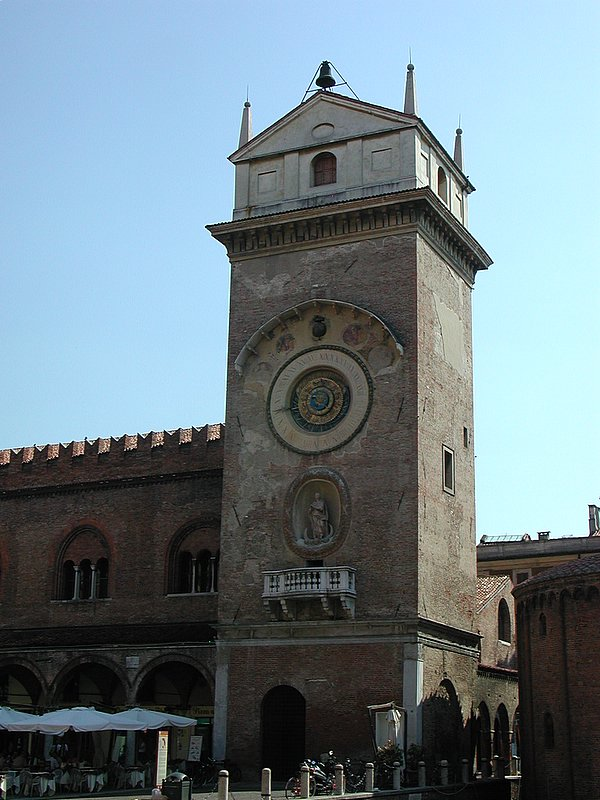
The Torre dell'Orologio of the Palazzo della Ragione, Mantua, constructed by Luca Fancelli in 1473.

Fancelli was born in Settignano, a fraction of Florence. Much of his life and work is an enigma; what is known for sure is that he trained as a stonecutter and mason and studied under Brunelleschi.

Giorgio Vasari, the 16th-century Florentine artist and biographer of the artists, is responsible for many doubts pertaining to the authenticity of works attributed to Fancelli. While Fancelli likely designed the Palazzo Pitti, the Florentine residence of the Medici's friend, and supposed rival, Luca Pitti; Vasari attributes the design to Brunelleschi, who had died several years before work began. The palazzo is not in Brunelleschi's style, and considered by many to be by a lesser hand. Fancelli has also been credited also with the design of the tribune of SS. Annunziata in Florence, but this too is disputed.

In 1450 Fancelli moved to Mantua, where he was employed in the court of Marquis Ludovico III. Mantua under the Gonzagas was artistic center, employing Pisanello, Mantegna, Perugino, Correggio, Leon Battista Alberti, Giulio Romano, and Rubens.

At Mantua, Fancelli became clerk of works and supervisory architect for the churches of San Sebastiano (1460), and Sant'Andrea (1472) while the plans for both churches were drawn by Alberti himself, Fancelli's input was large, especially at the church of Sant'Andrea, which was begun only shortly before Alberti's death.

The Marquess of Mantua Federico I began work on a new royal palace in the city, and Fancelli received the commission to design a complex of rooms for new palace centred on its clock tower, this wing known as the Domus Nova ("New House"). Fancelli worked on from 1478 to 1484, but the palace itself remained incomplete until the 17th century.

The final years of Fancelli's life are characteristically enigmatic; he disappears from all written references from 1494.

== Sources ==
- Vasić Vatovec, Corinna (1979). Luca Fancelli, architetto: epistolario gonzaghesco. Florence.
