= Solomon Aviad Sar-Shalom Basilea =

Italian rabbi and writer (c. 1680–1743)

Rabbi Solomon Aviad Sar-Shalom Basilea
- אביעד שר שלום באזילה
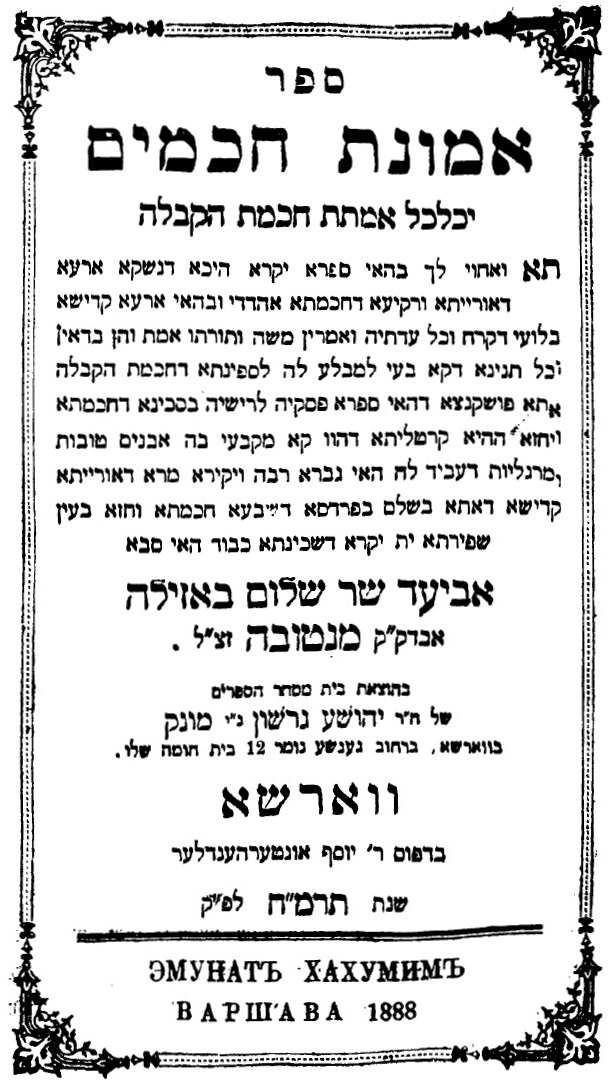
- Title page of Emunat Ḥakamim, Warsaw, 1888

Personal life
- Born: c. 1680
- Died: 1743 (aged 62–63)
- Parent: Menahem Samson ben Solomon (father)
- Occupation: rabbi

Religious life
- Religion: Judaism

Jewish leader
- Residence: Mantua

Solomon Aviad Sar-Shalom Basilea (Hebrew: אביעד שר שלום באזילה; c. 1680–1743) was an Italian rabbi and writer who served as Av Beit Din of Mantua.

== Life ==
Basilea was instructed in religion and Kabbalah by his father, Menahem Samson ben Solomon of Mantua (died 1693 at Mantua), a rabbi in Alessandria, Italy, and Chief Rabbi at Mantua. His Hebrew name, Aviad Sar-Shalom, derived from the Biblical verse Pele-joez-el-gibbor-abi-ad-sar-shalom in Isaiah 9, bears testimony to the Messianic hopes of his kinsman. He was reared under the eyes of Moses ben Mordecai Zacuto, of Vital Norzi, of the Segrès; his chief teacher was Judah Brieli; and his fellow-student was Isaac Lampronti, the author of Paḥad Yiẓḥaḳ (Hebrew: פחד יצחק).

At the age of ten, he commenced the study of the various sciences, and plunged with avidity into the theosophy of Moses Cordovero. He attempted poetry, and edited, with a commentary, the mystic poem of Moses Zacuto, 'Aruk Tofteh (alluding to Isaiah 30:33), (Venice, 1715, 1744; Metz, 1777). That he acquired a profound knowledge of the Talmud and of the casuists is shown by his correspondence with Judah Brieli, Gabriel Pontremoli, and Abraham Segrè; and his decisions are incorporated in No. 59 of the Halberstamm collection, in the Paḥad Yiẓḥaḳ by his fellow-student Lampronti, in the responsa of Jacob Emden, and elsewhere.

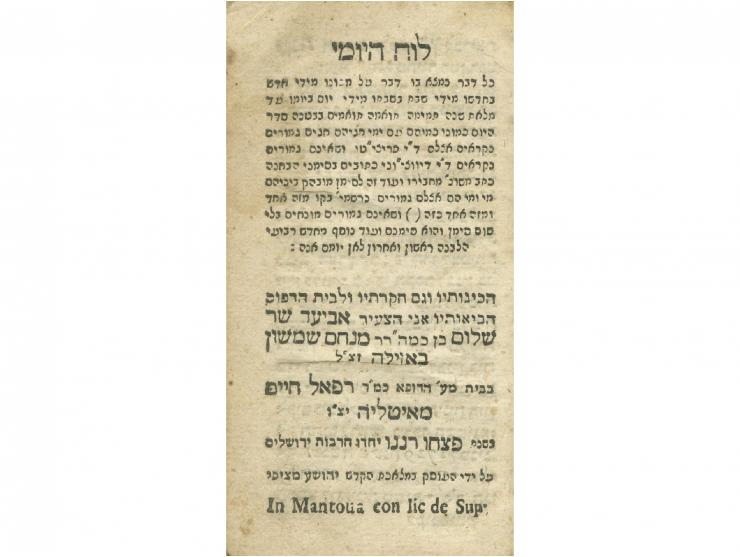
Luaḥ published by Basilea at Mantua

Basilea enjoyed a deserved reputation for geometrical knowledge; he edited Euclid's Elements for the use of Abraham Segrè (Günzburg Collection, No. 215); and was also versed in astronomy. He exchanged letters in Italian with Samson Bachi the younger, of Casale, an uncle of Rabbi Isaac Raphael Finzi, upon the principles of the calendar, between 1694 and 1701, and wrote a preface for his treatise entitled Nayer ha-Yamim (A Paper on the Years) (Günzburg Collection, Nos. 312, 579); in 1727 he commenced to publish Luaḥ or Pocket Daily Calendar: it appeared at Mantua in 32mo, and included the dates of the Christian festivals.

At the age of forty-four, in company with Samuel Norzi, Solomon initiated himself into the intricacies of the kabbalistic system of Isaac Luria. He prepared a work in which he reproached all philosophers and exegetes who had not taken part in the mystical movement, and adduced specious arguments for the authenticity of the Zohar. His work, even before it appeared in print, aroused a most heated opposition. Gad dell'Aquila implored the author most earnestly not to insult the memory of Abraham ibn Ezra by the publication of his book (Günzburg Collection, No. 179). He took some time to revise it, rather to amplify, however, than to moderate its expressions; and it appeared in 1730 under the title of Emunat Ḥakamim (The Faith of the Wise). The work includes quotations from Pythagoras, Plato, Aristotle, Alexander of Aphrodisias, Averroes, Avicenna, Copernicus, Fr. Piccolomini, I. Cotogno (De Triplici Statu Animi), and others. Jacob Emden attempted to refute the book in his Miṭpaḥat Sefarim (Hebrew: מטפחת ספרים).

Basilea took the part of Moshe Chaim Luzzatto when the latter was persecuted: it was probably owing to this that a search-warrant was issued against him on the ground that he possessed forbidden books in his library. Being convicted of owning non-expurgated works, he was thrown into prison in June, 1733; on May 28, 1734, he was reported sick at his house, and on June 23, 1738, was sentenced to three years' domiciliary arrest, which penalty was commuted June 18, 1739, by the curia of Rome into confinement within the ghetto-walls. In 1742, he affixed his approbation to Solomon Norzi's work Minḥat Shay (Hebrew: מנחת שי), having examined an incomplete manuscript of the same (Letter 36 of the epistolary collection in the Friedländ library); but he died on the last day of Tabernacles, 1743, without having witnessed its completion.
