= Samuel Romanelli =

Samuel Romanelli (born at Mantua Sept. 19, 1757; died at Casale Monferrato Oct. 17, 1814) was an Italian-born Jewish maskil and Hebrew poet. A man of great gifts but unsteady in his habits, Romanelli began to travel early in life. He went first to Morocco, where he spent four years. He has described his experiences there in a work which has become very popular (see below). Returning to Europe, he lived successively in Berlin (1791), Vienna (1793), London (1799), and Lille (France), going back to his native country about 1800. The last years of his life were spent in Casale, where he died suddenly of apoplexy.

Romanelli supported himself by teaching and by writing Hebrew and Italian poems for weddings, patriotic feasts, and similar occasions; but, being erratic and a scoffer of religion, he made very many enemies, and always lived in great poverty. Besides his Hebrew poems, he wrote translations, especially of the prayer-book, from Hebrew into Italian and from Italian into Hebrew. Notable among his translations from Italian are those of Metastasio's melodrama "Themistocles" and Maffei's tragedy "Merope"; the latter has been edited by Weikert, a Benedictine monk (Rome, 1903, 2d ed. 1904), while the former is still in manuscript. For the names in the original Romanelli gives Hebrew substitutes, as Merab for Merope, Palti for Polifonte, etc. The Hebrew version, while not literally following the original, is not only poetical, but also a faithful rendering.

== Literary work ==
- "Ha-Ḳolot Yeḥdalun" or "Mishpaṭ Shalom" (Berlin, 1791), a Hebrew melodrama in honor of a wedding
- "Massa' ba-'Arab" or "Travail in an Arab Land" (ib. 1792), a description of his travels in the Barbary States, several times reprinted, and translated into English by Schiller-Szinessy (Cambridge, 1887)
- "Ruaḥ Nakon" (Berlin, 1792), a philosophic poem
- "'Alot ha-Minḥah" or "Ḥeber ha-Me'ushshar" (Vienna, 1793), a poem in honor of the wedding of L. Hertz and Charlotte Arnstein, in Italian and Hebrew
- "Grammatica Ragionata Italiana ed Ebraica," Triest, 1799
- An Italian translation of parts of the Sephardic ritual (n.p., 1802)
- "Zimrat 'Ariẓim" (Mantua, 1807), hymns in honor of Napoleon
- "Maḥazeh Shaddai" (ib. 1808), Hebrew and Italian poems
- A poetical translation of that part of the Yom Kippur service which describes the office of the high priest on the Day of Atonement (Alessandria, 1808)
- "Tappuaḥ Zahab" (Vienna, c. 1810), an epos from Greek mythology
- A Hebrew hymn on Emperor Francis of Austria and his brother Archduke Carl (n.d., n.p.)
