= Shiraz pogrom =

1910 pogrom carried out by Muslims against Jews in Iran

- Location: Shiraz, Qajar Iran
- Date: 30 October 1910
- Attack type: Pogrom, Massacre
- Deaths: 12 civilians
- Injuries: ~ 50 injured
- Victim: Iranian Jews
- Perpetrators: Qavam family and their supporters
- Motive: Antisemitism

Shiraz pogrom or Shiraz blood libel of 1910 was a pogrom perpetrated in the Jewish quarter of Shiraz, Iran, on 30 October 1910, organized by the Qavam family and sparked by accusations that the Jews had ritually killed a Muslim girl. In the course of the pogrom, 12 Jews were killed and about 50 were injured. Besides the casualties, 6,000 Jews of Shiraz were robbed of all their possessions. The event was documented by the representative of the Alliance Israélite Universelle in Shiraz.

== History ==
There has been a significant Jewish population in Iran for 2,500 years. Pogroms have not been unknown: In 1892, several Jews were murdered in Shiraz. Twenty Jews were murdered and three synagogues were burned down in 1897. Pogroms, forced conversion and expulsion swept Zarqon, Lar, Jahrom, Darab, Nobendigan, Sarvestan and Kazerun. Jamshid Sedaghat, a historian in Shiraz, has said attacks happened annually during the late 19th century, finally ending as a result of pressure from Europe. The last of these occurred in 1910.

Historical treatment of Jews in Iran would change depending on the ruler. However, it was described by historians that Jews were heavily mistreated and oppressed throughout the Safavid and Qajar eras. For example, in the middle of the 19th century, J. J. Benjamin wrote about the life of Persian Jews: "…they are obliged to live in a separate part of town…; for they are considered as unclean creatures… Under the pretext of their being unclean, they are treated with the greatest severity and should they enter a street, inhabited by Mussulmans, they are pelted by the boys and mobs with stones and dirt… For the same reason, they are prohibited to go out when it rains; for it is said the rain would wash dirt off them, which would sully the feet of the Mussulmans… If a Jew is recognized as such in the streets, he is subjected to the greatest insults. The passers-by spit in his face, and sometimes beat him… unmercifully… If a Jew enters a shop for anything, he is forbidden to inspect the goods… Should his hand incautiously touch the goods, he must take them at any price the seller chooses to ask for them... Sometimes the Iranians intrude into the dwellings of the Jews and take possession of whatever please them. Should the owner make the least opposition in defense of his property, he incurs the danger of atoning for it with his life... If... a Jew shows himself in the street during the three days of the Katel (qatl al-Husayn, or "murder of Husayn"; a Shi'a commemoration)…, he is sure to be murdered."

== Events of 1910 ==
=== October 1910 ===
In the beginning of October 1910, while cleaning the cesspools of a Jewish house in Shiraz, some scavengers claimed to have found an old book, some pages of which remained clean and were recognized as a part of the Qur'an. Under Islam, the judgment for corrupting the Koran is death, whether carried out by a Muslim or not. Then, on the first day of Sukkot, several Jews were coming home from a synagogue when they saw a veiled woman standing at the entrance of their house with a parcel. Seeing that she was noticed, the woman hurriedly threw the parcel into a cesspool (that were located near the front door in all Jewish houses) and ran away. The dwellers of the house promptly pulled out the parcel and found it to be a copy of the Qur'an. After being informed of this incident and fearing further provocations, the representative of the Alliance Israélite Universelle in the city contacted Mirza Ibrahim, the chief mullah of Shiraz, who promised to ignore the provocation and lend his assistance in case of need.

=== Allegations of ritual murder ===
The next evening, some people entered the houses of the two chief rabbis of Shiraz, Mollah Rabbi Shelomo (father of Mollah Meir Moshe Dayanim) and Mirza Ibrahim. They were accompanied by a bazaar merchant, who stated that one of his children, a girl of four, had disappeared in the afternoon in the Jewish quarter, where she had been killed to obtain her blood. The frightened rabbis swore that they did not know that a child of Muslim parents had strayed into the Jewish quarter and protested against the accusation. The people withdrew after threatening to put the entire Jewish quarter to fire and sword if the girl had not been found by noon the next day. On the same day, the body of a child was found one kilometer away from the city behind an abandoned palace, one hundred meters from the Jewish cemetery. Some thought that the body was that of the missing Muslim girl and that she had been killed by the Jews. Subsequently, it was found to be the disinterred body of a Jewish boy who had been buried eight days previously.

=== Violence ===
The next morning, a crowd began to gather in front of the government palace; the people were accusing the Jews of murdering the girl and were vociferously demanding vengeance. The temporary governor ordered the troops to attack the "mob", and the crowd headed for the Jewish quarter, where they arrived simultaneously with the soldiers. The latter, contrary to the orders given to them, were the first to attack the Jewish quarters, giving the rest of the mob a signal to plunder. Soldiers, sayyids, Qashqais who were in the city to sell livestock, even women and children, joined in the pillage, which lasted for six to seven hours, not sparing a single one of 260 houses in the Jewish quarter. The representative of the Alliance Israélite Universelle thus described the robbing:

|The thieves formed a chain in the street. They passed along the line carpets, bundles of goods, bales of merchandise [...], anything, in a word, which was salable. Anything, which did not have commercial value or which, on account of its weight or size, could not be carried off, was, in a fury of vandalism, destroyed and broken. The doors and windows of the houses were torn off their hinges and carried away or smashed to pieces. The rooms and cellars were literally ploughed up to see whether the substratum did not conceal some wealth.

The people did not limit themselves to alleged robbery, but also engaged in combat against the Jews. Most Jews fled, some to their Muslim friends' homes, others in the British consulate, on the terraces, and in mosques. Those few who stayed were injured or killed. Twelve were killed in the mêlée, another fifteen were stabbed or hit with bludgeons or bullets, and a further forty sustained minor injuries.

=== Aftermath ===
As a result of the pogrom, the Jewish quarter was completely devastated:

Women, men, and old folk are rolling in the dust, beating their chests and demanding justice. Others, plunged into a state of genuine stupor, appear to be unconscious and in the throes of an awful nightmare which won't end.

Relief efforts were organized by the Alliance Israélite Universelle, assisted by the British consul. Some local Muslims helped too, distributing bread, grapes, and money. One wealthy Muslim sent a ton of bread, the governor sent two tons, and the chief mufti a further 400 kilograms.

== See also ==
- Iranian Jews
  - Mashhadi Jews
  - Allahdad Massacre
- History of the Jews in Iran
- Dönmeh
- Chala
- Converso
- Marrano
- Neofiti
- Blood libel
- Persian Constitution of 1906, gave rights to minorities as Zoroastrians, Christians and Jews

== Sources ==
- Nataf, M. Letter of 31.10.1910. AIU Bulletin, No 35, 1910, pp. 182–188. English translation in Littman, David (1979). "Jews Under Muslim Rule: The Case Of Persia". The Wiener Library Bulletin XXXII (New series 49/50).
