= Anusim =

Legal category of Jews

Anusim (Hebrew: אֲנוּסִים, pronounced [ʔanuˈsim]; sg. masculine, anús, אָנוּס, pronounced [ʔaˈnus]; sg. feminine, anusá, אֲנוּסָה, pronounced [ʔanuˈsa]), meaning "coerced", is a legal category of Jews in Halakha (Jewish law) who were forced to abandon Judaism against their will, typically during forced conversion to another religion (oftentimes Christianity). The term "anusim" is most properly translated as the "coerced [ones]" or the "forced [ones]".

== Etymology ==
The term anusim is derived from the Talmudic phrase da'afilu b'oneis (דַּאֲפִילּוּ בְּאוֹנֶס, 'even if it was rape'), connotating "a forced transgression." The Hebrew ones (pronounced [ˈones]) derives from the triconsonantal root א-נ-ס (aleph-nun-samekh), and originally referred to any case in which an individual had been forced into any act against their will. In Modern Hebrew, the word oneis typically means 'rape'; thus, "anusim" typically refers to rape victims, with the historical meaning applying only to the Iberian Jews forced to convert to Christianity.

The term anús is used in contradistinction to meshumad (מְשׁוּמָד, 'self-destroyed one'): a Jew who has voluntarily abandoned Judaism in whole or part. The forced converts were also known in Spanish as cristianos nuevos and cristãos-novos in Portuguese. Converso or marrano, the latter meaning "pig" in Spanish, was used by Christians as a slur toward anusim.

== Related terms ==
Besides the term anusim, Halakha has various classifications for those Jews who have abandoned, or are no longer committed to, Rabbinic Judaism, whether or not they have converted to another religion.

The two most common descriptions:

- "Min" (מין)—or an apostate of Judaism—for a Jew who denies the fundamental existence of God.
- "Meshumad" (מְשׁוּמָּד), literally "self-destroyed"—a heretic in Judaism; a Jew who deliberately rebels against the Jewish principles of faith and/or Halakha.

The main difference between a min, a meshumad, and the anusim is that the act of abandonment of Judaism is voluntary for a min and a meshumad, while for the anusim it is not. In contemporary Jewish culture, the term "anusim" has also been used to describe "reverse Marranos": Haredi Jews who are religious on the outside but are not necessarily practicing in private.

== History of use ==
The term anusim became more frequently used after the forced conversion to Christianity of Ashkenazi Jews in Germany at the end of the 11th century. In his religious legal opinions, Rashi, a French rabbi who lived during this period, commented about the issue of anusim.

Several centuries later, following the mass forced conversion of Sephardi Jews (those Jews with extended histories in Spain and Portugal, known jointly as Iberia, or Sepharad in Hebrew) of the 15th and 16th centuries, the term "anusim" became widely used by Spanish rabbis and their successors for the following 600 years.

The term may be applied to any Jew of any ethnic division. Since the 15th and 16th centuries, it has also been applied to other forcibly or coercively-converted Jews, including the Mashhadi Jews of Persia (now Iran), who converted to Islam in the public eye but secretly practised Judaism at home.

In the non-Rabbinic literature, the more widely known Sephardic anusim were also referred to as:

- "Conversos", meaning "converts [to Christianity]" in Spanish, Portuguese, Catalan and Ladino (Judaeo-Spanish).
- "New Christians", or cristianos nuevos in Spanish and cristãos novos in Portuguese (Catalan: cristians novells), which also encompasses converts from Islam.
- "Marranos", a term which refers to those conversos who practiced Judaism in secret and, as a result, were targeted by the Spanish Inquisition.

== In rabbinic literature ==
The subject of anusim has a special place in rabbinic literature. In normal circumstances, a person who abandons Jewish observance, or part of it, is classified as a meshumad. Such a person is still counted as a Jew for purposes of lineage, but is under a disability to claim any privilege pertaining to Jewish status: for example, he should not be counted in a minyan, that is, a quorum for religious services.

Anusim, by contrast, not only remain Jews by lineage but continue to count as fully qualified Jews for all purposes. Since the act of the original abandonment of the religion was done against the Jew's will, the Jew under force may remain a kosher Jew, as long as the anús keeps practising Jewish law to the best of his/her abilities under the coerced condition. In this sense, "kosher" is the rabbinic legal term applied to a Jew who adheres to rabbinic tradition and is accordingly not subject to any disqualification.

== Rabbinic legal opinions ==
Se‘adyá ben Maimón ibn Danan in the 15th century stated:

Indeed, when it comes to lineage, all the people of Israel are brethren. We are all the sons of one father, the rebels (reshaim) and criminals, the heretics (meshumadim) and forced ones (anusim), and the proselytes (gerim) who are attached to the house of Jacob. All these are Israelites. Even if they left God or denied Him, or violated His Law, the yoke of that Law is still upon their shoulders and will never be removed from them.

Hakham Joseph Shalom, writing in the 16th century, stated:

This is how it is with these conversos: They derive from the hope of Israel, despite the fact that they have been immersed among the idolaters. Their hope and righteousness endure forever (...) furthermore, when they come to be included among the Jews, they are simply circumcised; they are not immersed like converts who were never part of the Jewish people.

Ben-Zion Meir Hai Uziel, the Chief Sephardic Rabbi of the State of Israel, stated in the mid-20th century:

And we still have to clarify on the (subject of) Anusím, to whom the government forbids them to perform Halakhicly valid marriages, if it's necessary to say that their wives must have a Get to permit them (to marry another man), for the reason that, by force of the Law (Hazakah/חזקה), a man does not have intercourse for promiscuity (Zenut/זנות) ... (In our very case), we deal with those who converted and kept Torah in secrecy and hide their religion because of the gentile surveillance, we say that they do have intercourse for the sake of marriage.

It follows that Uziel considered anusím as Jews, because only Jews can give or receive a get, a Jewish divorce. Maimonides stated in the Mishneh Torah Sefer Shofetím, Hilekhót Mumarím 3:3:

But their children and grandchildren [of Jewish rebels], who, misguided by their parents ... and trained in their views, are like children taken captive by the gentiles and raised in their laws and customs (וגידלוהו הגויים על דתם), whose status is that of an ’anús [one who abjures Jewish law under duress], who, although he later learns that he is a Jew, meets Jews, observes them practice their laws, is nevertheless to be regarded as an ’anús, since he was reared in the erroneous ways of his parents ... Therefore efforts should be made to bring them back in repentance (לפיכך ראוי להחזירם בתשובה), to draw them near by friendly relations, so that they may return to the strength-giving source, i.e., the Toráh.

== Current status ==
There is much controversy regarding the status of conversions today. While the chief rabbis are wary of converting large groups, there are some rabbis such as Haim Amsalem and Chuck Davidson who have done mass conversions of Bnei Anusim (descendants of original Anusim). In the United States Reform rabbi Jacques Cukierkorn is one of the leaders of the outreach movement to the descendants of those Crypto-Jews who wish to renew their ties with the Jewish people.

== See also ==
- Allahdad
- Banu Israil
- Chala
- Converso
- Crypto-Judaism
- Dönmeh
- Epikoros
- Marrano
- Neofiti
- Orphans' Decree
- Sephardic Bnei Anusim
- Taqqiya
- Who is a Jew?
