= Kingdom of Aragon =

Kingdom in Iberia from 1035 to 1707

Coordinates: 41°39′N 0°54′W

Kingdom of Aragon: Reino d'Aragón (Aragonese); Regne d'Aragó (Catalan); Regnum Aragonum (Latin); Reino de Aragón (Spanish)
- 1035–1707

- Location of the Kingdom of Aragon (orange, at the left) within the Crown of Aragon
- Status: Independent kingdom (1035–1162); Kingdom of the Crown of Aragon (1162–1707)
- Capital: Jaca (1035–1096); Huesca (1096–1118); Zaragoza (1118–1833)
- Common languages: Aragonese, Spanish, Catalan, Latin, Mozarabic, Andalusi Arabic
- Religion: Roman Catholicism; Judaism (minority, until 1492); Islam (minority, until 1526)
- Government: Feudal monarchy
- Legislature: Cortes of Aragon
- Historical era: Medieval; Early Modern
  - County of Aragon established as independent kingdom: 1035
  - Nueva Planta decrees dissolved Aragonese institutions: 1707
Preceded by	Succeeded by
County of Aragon	1162: Crown of Aragon; 1707: Bourbon Spain
- Today part of: Spain

The Kingdom of Aragon (Aragonese: Reino d'Aragón; Catalan: Regne d'Aragó; Latin: Regnum Aragoniae; Spanish: Reino de Aragón) was a medieval and early modern kingdom on the Iberian Peninsula, corresponding to the modern-day autonomous community of Aragon, in Spain. It became a part of the larger Crown of Aragon, which also included other territories—the Principality of Catalonia (which included the former Catalan Counties), the Kingdom of Valencia, the Kingdom of Majorca, and other possessions that are now part of France, Italy, and Greece—that were also under the rule of the King of Aragon, but were administered separately from the Kingdom of Aragon.

In 1479, upon John II of Aragon's death, the crowns of Aragon and Castile were united to form the nucleus of modern Spain. The Aragonese lands retained autonomous parliamentary and administrative institutions, such as the Corts. The arrangement remained until the Nueva Planta decrees, promulgated between 1707 and 1715 by Philip V of Spain in the aftermath of the War of the Spanish Succession, centralised power in Spain. However, the title "King of Aragon" would continue to be used by the centralised Spanish crown.

== History ==
=== Independent kingdom ===
Aragon was originally a Carolingian feudal county around the city of Jaca, which in the first half of the 9th century became a vassal state of the Kingdom of Pamplona (later, the Kingdom of Navarre), its own dynasty of counts ending without a male heir in 922. The name Aragón is the same as that of the river Aragón, which flows by Jaca. It might derive from Basque: Haragona, lit. 'good upper valley'.

On the death of Sancho III of Pamplona in 1035, the Kingdom of Pamplona was divided into three parts: (1) Pamplona and its hinterlands along with western and coastal Basque districts, (2) Castile, and (3) Sobrarbe, Ribagorza, and Aragon. Sancho's son Gonzalo inherited Sobrarbe and Ribargorza. His illegitimate son Ramiro received Aragon. Gonzalo was killed soon after, and all the land he owned went to his brother Ramiro, thus becoming the first de facto king of Aragon, although he never used that title.

By defeating his brother, García Sánchez III, Ramiro achieved independence for Aragon. His son Sancho Ramírez, who also inherited the Kingdom of Navarre, was the first to call himself "King of the Aragonese and Pamplonese". As the Aragonese domains expanded to the south, conquering land from al-Andalus, the capital moved from Jaca to Huesca (1096), and later to Zaragoza (1118).

After Alfonso the Battler died childless in 1134, different rulers were chosen for Navarre and Aragon, and the two kingdoms ceased to have the same ruler. By 1285, the southernmost areas of what is now Aragon had been taken from the Muslims.

=== Dynastic union with the County of Barcelona ===
The Kingdom of Aragon gave the name to the Crown of Aragon, created in 1150 with the dynastic union resulting from the marriage of the Queen of Aragon, Petronilla, and the Count of Barcelona, Ramon Berenguer IV. Their son Alfonso II inherited all of the territories ruled by his father and mother. The King of Aragon also held the title of Count of Barcelona and ruled territories that consisted of not only the present administrative region of Aragon, but also Catalonia, and later the kingdoms of Majorca, Valencia, Sicily, Naples and Sardinia.

The King of Aragón was the direct ruler of the Aragonese region, and held the titles of Count of Provence, Count of Barcelona, Lord of Montpellier, and Duke of Athens and Neopatria. Each of these titles gave him sovereignty over a certain region, and these titles changed as he won and lost territories. In the 14th century, his power was greatly restricted by the Union of Aragon.

=== Union of the Crowns of Aragon and Castile and afterwards ===
The Crown of Aragon became a part of the Spanish monarchy after the dynastic union with Castile, which supposed the de facto unification of both kingdoms under a common monarch. The house of Barcelona held the Crown until 1410, when it went extinct. Subsequently, in 1412 the Aragonese secured the election of a Castilian prince, Ferdinand of Antequera, to the vacant Aragonese throne, over strong Catalan opposition. One of Ferdinand's successors, John II of Aragon (1458–1479), countered residual Catalan resistance by arranging for his heir, Ferdinand, to marry Isabella, the heir presumptive of Henry IV of Castile.

In 1479, upon John II's death, the crowns of Aragon and Castile were united to form the nucleus of modern Spain. Aragonese territories retained their autonomous parliamentary and administrative institutions, such as the Corts, until the Nueva Planta decrees, which were promulgated between 1707 and 1715 by Philip V of Spain in the aftermath of the War of the Spanish Succession. The decrees de jure ended the kingdoms of Aragon, Valencia and Mallorca, and the Principality of Catalonia, and merged them with Castile to officially form the Spanish kingdom. A new Nueva Planta decree in 1711 restored some rights in Aragon, such as the Aragonese Civil Rights, but upheld the end of the political independence of the kingdom.

The previous Kingdom of Aragon remained as an administrative unit until 1833, when it was divided into the three existing provinces. In the aftermath of Francisco Franco's death, Aragon became one of the autonomous communities of Spain in 1982.

== Ethic Groups of Kingdom of Aragon ==
The three main ethnic groups of the kingdom were Christians, Mudéjars, and Jews. The Christian population, which made up about 70% of the population, was also the group that was in power. Christians were the backbone of the economy, with many beings peasants and serfs working the land as farmers. Others were shepherds, another vital part of the Aragon economy, or craftsmen forging tools and armor, making buildings, roads, and clothes, or supplying food and drink. Still more were sailors, as Aragon had a desire to expand into the Mediterranean, and later on the Americas, with King Ferdinand II sponsoring the voyages of Christopher Columbus from 1492 until 1504. Lastly, Christians made up the entire population of knights and lords, administrators, and monks, priests, and bishops.

Mudejars made up about 15% of the Aragon population, and were the Muslim part of the Kingdom. The name, meaning 'permitted to remain' in Arabic, refers to Muslims who decided to stay in the Iberian Peninsula after the Reconquista. In order to stay, the mudejars had to pay a special poll tax to the Spanish government, and in return they were able to form their own communities, practice their own religion, and speak their own language, albeit as second-class citizens. The mudejars were skilled craftsmen, and often worked in fields such as wood and metal working, as well as making textiles. In more rural areas, the mudejars were also known to be farmers. However, the most lasting aspect of mudejar culture is their architecture. The most notable of these that survived to this day is the Alcázar of Seville, the oldest royal palace still in use in Europe.

the Jewish community, at its peak, made up about 10% of the population. They self governed their own communities, called aljamas, that featured synagogues, schools, and hospitals. The Jews had good roles in society, serving as bailiffs, royal treasurers, doctors, diplomats, and translators, with Jews often being the group to bridge the gaps between the three ethnoreligious communities. Around the year 1200, under the rule of Pedro II, Jewish communities were often called upon by Peter II of Aragon (d. 1213) to loan him their money so he could pay off war debts, with the majority of his possessions and revenue actually mortgaged to the Jewish community. Then, under Pedro's son James I, all Jews and their possessions came under the king's special protection, but in return the Jews had to pay more taxes.

However, this protection was short lived, as in the centuries to come Christians would become increasinly unhappy with the Jewish community. The tensions grew for over 180 years, before the teachings of the antisemitic firebrand Ferrand Martínez drove Christians to discriminate against the Jewish community in 1391, which continued for another century, culminating the expulsion of Jews from Spain and the subsequent Spanish Inquisition.

== Anti Jewish riots of 1391 ==
Ferrand Martínez was an archdeacon of Écija, a prominent town in the nearby Kingdom of Seville. Beginning in 1378, Martínez underwent a decade-long campaign calling for the removal of Jews and their synagogues in Seville, claiming it would be a service to God to either kill or convert all of the Jews to Christianity. King John I of Castile and the Archbishop of Seville ordered Martínez to stop his preaching, but he ignored both their warnings. In 1390, the Archbishop died, and Martínez took on the role of chief administrator of the Seville Cathedral. A year later, in 1391, King John I died, and extreme political instability followed; his 11-year-old son was enthroned as Henry III. With no archbishop and an extremely young king, Martínez took advantage of his position of power.

Martínez's years of preaching would reach a breaking point in the Massacre of 1391; a mob of Christians stormed the Jewish sections of Seville on June 6, 1391. Jewish deaths reached around 4000 in Seville, with thousands more converting to Christianity after being given the choice of conversion or death by the sword. The violence quickly spread into the Kingdom of Aragon, with the region of Valencia being a notable target. In one such case, starting on July 9th, from a population of 2500 Jews, 2300 were murdered and the surviving 200 were forced to convert. Valencia-wide, around 11,000 Jews converted to escape death or expulsion, and within the entire Kingdom of Aragon, that number neared 100,000.

The riots as a whole changed Spanish society. Two new categories of people were identified: conversos were Jews who converted to Christianity during the riots, while marranos converted to Christianity, but continued to practice Judaism in secret. Many Christians continued to distrust former Jews.

After the marriage of Ferdinand and Isabella in 1469, the kingdoms of Aragon and Castile were united under the Catholic Monarchs of Spain, and nine years later, in 1478, Pope Sixtus IV issued a governance to the Monarchs to mobilize inquisitors, who could address the growing resentment of marranos by Christians. The inquisitors were meant to expel the Jews from Spain by enforcing religious uniformity, but they also helped Ferdinand and Isabella centralize their power, leading to the Spanish Inquisition.

The final nail in the coffin for the Jews came when Tomás de Torquemada was appointed Grand Inquisitor. On March 31, 1492, Torquemada convinced Ferdinand and Isabella to sign into law the Alhambra Decree, which ordered all unconverted Jews to leave the kingdom and all its territories by July 1492, resulting in 160,000 Jews being expelled and the end of Judaism in Spain.

== Image gallery ==
The current Coat of arms of Aragon

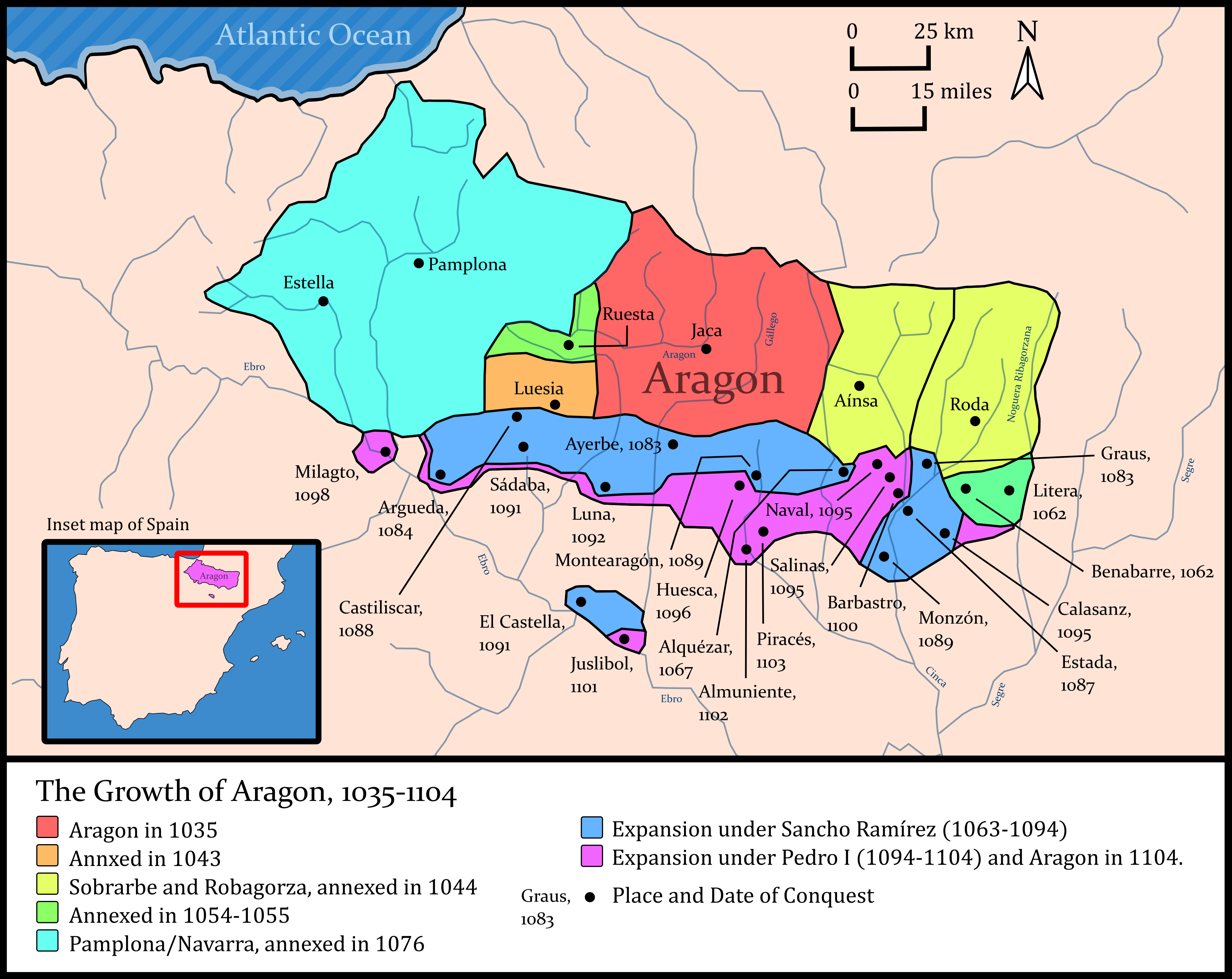
Expansion of Aragon in the 11th century.

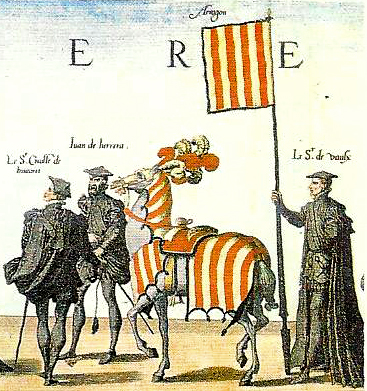
The historical banner of Aragon

The location of Aragon within the Crown of Aragon

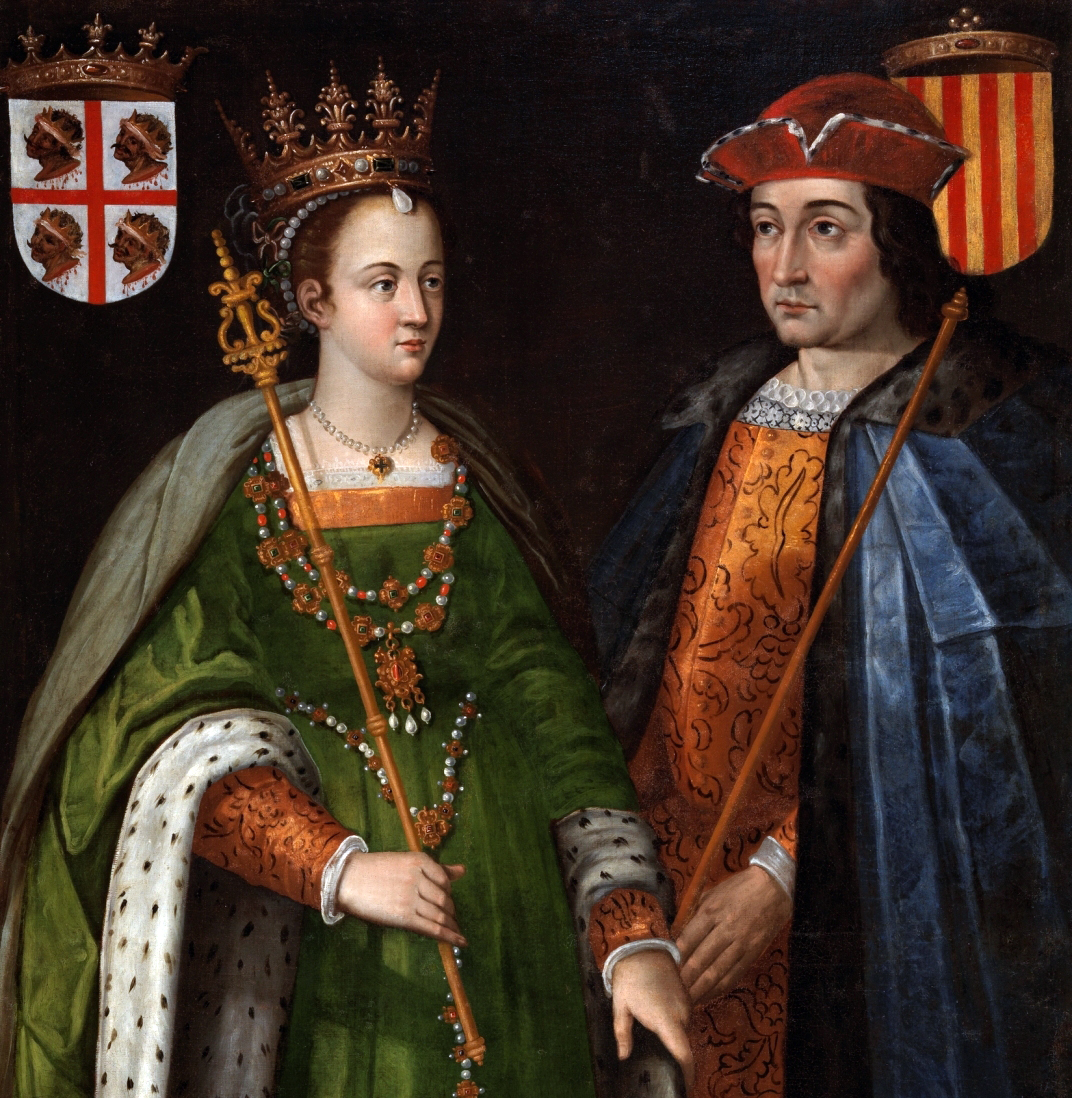
Petronilla of Aragon, and Ramon Berenguer IV, Count of Barcelona depicted later in a 16th-century painting

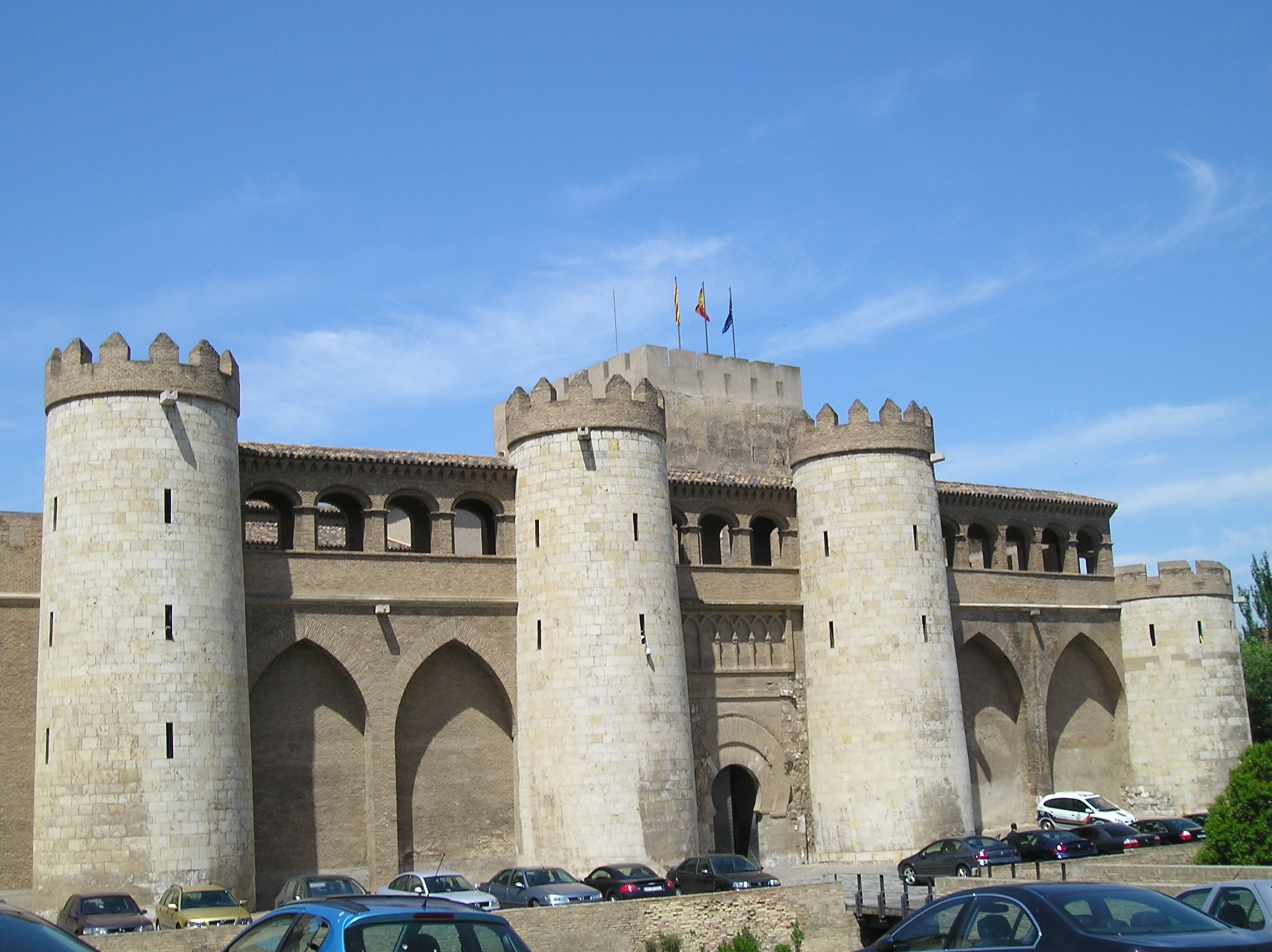
Aljafería Palace

== See also ==
- List of Aragonese monarchs
- List of Aragonese royal consorts
- List of Navarrese monarchs
- Counts of Barcelona
