= Festival of Santa Esterica =

Variant of Purim practiced in Latin America

The Festival of Santa Esterica is a holiday that was created as a substitute for Purim by the Anusim (also known as "conversos", Sephardi Jews forced to convert to Catholicism) after their expulsion from Spain in the late 15th century. It is still celebrated today in Latin America and the Southwestern United States.

== Name ==
The festival was themed about a fictional “Catholic” saint called "Esterica" who was heavily based upon Queen Esther. During the festival the New Christian women fasted for 3 days as Esther herself, her uncle Mordechai and the Jews of Persia did in the Book of Esther prior to her meeting with King Achashverosh.

== Historical overview ==
Although it was dangerous for the conversos to celebrate this festival due to its Jewish elements, as the Inquisition demanded no traits of their former religion be preserved, there are documents from Mexico that confirm the Festival of Esterica was held in Mexico as well.

The conversos who wanted to maintain their identity as Jews had fled to Portugal, yet they had to face another religiously-based persecution of Jews and Muslims by Manuel I of Portugal and expulsion in 1497; this was what brought them and their festival to the New World.

== Customs ==
According to historian Janet Liebman Jacobs, converso women used to light candles and cook a kosher banquet with their daughters – which helped passing out knowledge of the traditional Jewish cuisine to the next generations. (Note: “Women, Ritual, and Secrecy: The Creation of the Crypto-Jewish Culture,” Janet Liebman Jacobs)

The public festival celebrations had become private events that were celebrated with the family indoors. The conversos had also started to honor Esther with iconographic art pieces they made in her image and held in their households.

Moshe Orfali claims in his book The Fast of Esther in the Lore of the Marranos that the conversos lived with the perpetual feeling of sin since they had to act like Christians towards the outside world while deep inside were Jewish, and that the fast helped them to feel as they were making up for their sin to God.

== Observance ==
The popularity of the Festival of Santa Esterica had begun to decrease between the years 1964 and 1974, following the statements of James Peter Davis, the Archbishop of Santa Fe who studied the festival and had begun preaching to Hispanics who celebrated it that they were actually practicing a Jewish holiday based on Purim and that there was no such saint called Esterica. As a result, it is less common to find iconographic Esterica art pieces at Southwestern United States houses today than until the 20th century.

According to The Book of Esther in Modern Research by Leonard Greenspoon and Sidnie White Crawford, in the iconographic Esterica pieces that were common in the Americas the saint was depicted wearing a Crown on her head and holding a hanging rope. They interpret the motifs as signs of Judaism being grasped as something royal that comes with the risk of getting caught by the Christians and end the conversos' lives (The rope most probably represents the hanging of Haman, the king’s advisor that proposed the killing of Jewish people. The Jewish holiday of Purim celebrates the “switching of roles” - which is why you might see children in costumes on this holiday - one of the reasons being the hanging Haman planned for Mordechai, Queen Ester’s uncle, was ultimately his own execution) hanging.

In New Mexico, the art that decorated the conversos' houses with Santa Esterica were portrayed with red curtains that frame the icona.
