= Apostasy in Judaism =

Formal disaffiliation from the Jewish religion

Apostasy in Judaism is the rejection of Judaism and possible conversion to another religion by a Jew. The term apostasy is derived from Ancient Greek: ἀποστάτης, meaning 'rebellious' (Hebrew: מורד, romanized: mored). Equivalent expressions for apostate in Hebrew that are used by rabbinical scholars include mumar (מומר, literally 'one who is changed [out of their faith]'), poshea Yisrael (פושע ישראל, literally, 'transgressor of Israel'), and kofer (כופר). Similar terms are meshumad (משומד, lit. 'destroyed one'), and min (מין) or epikoros (אפיקורוס), which denote heresy and the negation of God and Judaism, implying atheism.

== Classes of apostates and relevance ==
A mumar is someone who does not observe a certain mitzvah or who observes no mitzvot at all. Rabbinic categories differentiate between a mumar ledavar echad (מומר לדבר אחד)—one who foregoes observance a certain mitzvah—and a mumar lekhol hatorah kulah (מומר לכל התורה כולה)—one who observes none of the Torah. Likewise, they differentiate between a mumar l'teyavon (מומר לתיאבון), who transgresses mitzvah(s) wantonly due to craving (teyavon) or convenience, versus a mumar l'hakh`is (מומר להכעיס), meaning one who transgresses out of spite, who defies the mitzvah willfully.

Some halakhic aspects of the status of a mumar include the following: a mumar is considered akin to a gentile in matters related to commerce; it is prohibited to lead them into actions that are forbidden; in the context of matrimony, ritual purity, and inheritance (with certain exceptions), they are classified as an Israelite; and the sages established that there is no mourning for a mumar.

However, today, another category, tinok shenishba ("captured infant"), a Jew who sins as a result of having been raised without sufficient knowledge and understanding of Judaism, is widely applied and should be considered. A tinok shenishba is not halakhically classified as a mumar, regardless of how much of Halakha they observe.

== Examples ==
=== In the Bible ===
The first recorded reference to apostasy from Judaism is in Deuteronomy 13:6–11, which states:

If your very own brother, or your son or daughter, or the wife you love, or your closest friend secretly entices you, saying, "Let us go and worship other gods" (gods that neither you nor your fathers have known, gods of the peoples around you, whether near or far, from one end of the land to the other), do not yield to him or listen to him. Show him no pity. Do not spare him or shield him. You must certainly put him to death. Your hand must be the first in putting him to death, and then the hands of all the people. Stone him to death, because he tried to turn you away from the LORD your God, who brought you out of Egypt, out of the land of slavery. Then all Israel will hear and be afraid, and no one among you will do such an evil thing again.

=== In the Talmud ===
In the Talmud, Elisha ben Abuyah (referred to as Acher, the "Other One") is singled out as an apostate by the rabbis.

=== Medieval Spain ===
In Medieval Spain, a systematic conversion of Jews to Christianity took place, largely under duress. The apostasy of these conversos provoked the indignation of some Jews in Spain and it was made illegal to call a converso by the epithet tornadizo (renegade).

Some Spanish Jews, however, remained crypto-Jews despite being compelled to convert to Christianity (see Anusim). They are also called Marranos.

=== Sabbatai Zevi and Jacob Frank ===
In 1648 Sabbatai Zevi claimed to be the Jewish Messiah. His Jewish followers were known as Sabbateans. Zevi converted to Islam in 1666. Afterwards, some of his followers willingly converted but continued to practise Sabbatean rituals. These people became known as the Dönmeh.

In the 1750s Jacob Frank claimed he was the reincarnation of Zevi and attracted many followers in Poland, known as Frankists. In 1759, with Frank's encouragement, more than 500 Frankists were baptized as Catholics. Frank himself was also baptized, with the King of Poland as his godfather.

== See also ==
- Conversion of Jews to Islam
- Criticism of Judaism
- Heresy in Judaism
- History of Jewish conversion to Christianity
- Humanistic Judaism
- Jewish atheism
- Jewish Buddhist
- Jewish schisms
- Jewish secularism
- List of Jewish atheists and agnostics
- Messianic Judaism
- Off the derech
- Religious disaffiliation
- Self-hating Jew
- Yerida - Emigration from Israel
- Zera Yisrael
