= First Bullet Monument =

Monument in İzmir, Turkey depicting Hasan Tahsin

- İlk Kurşun Anıtı
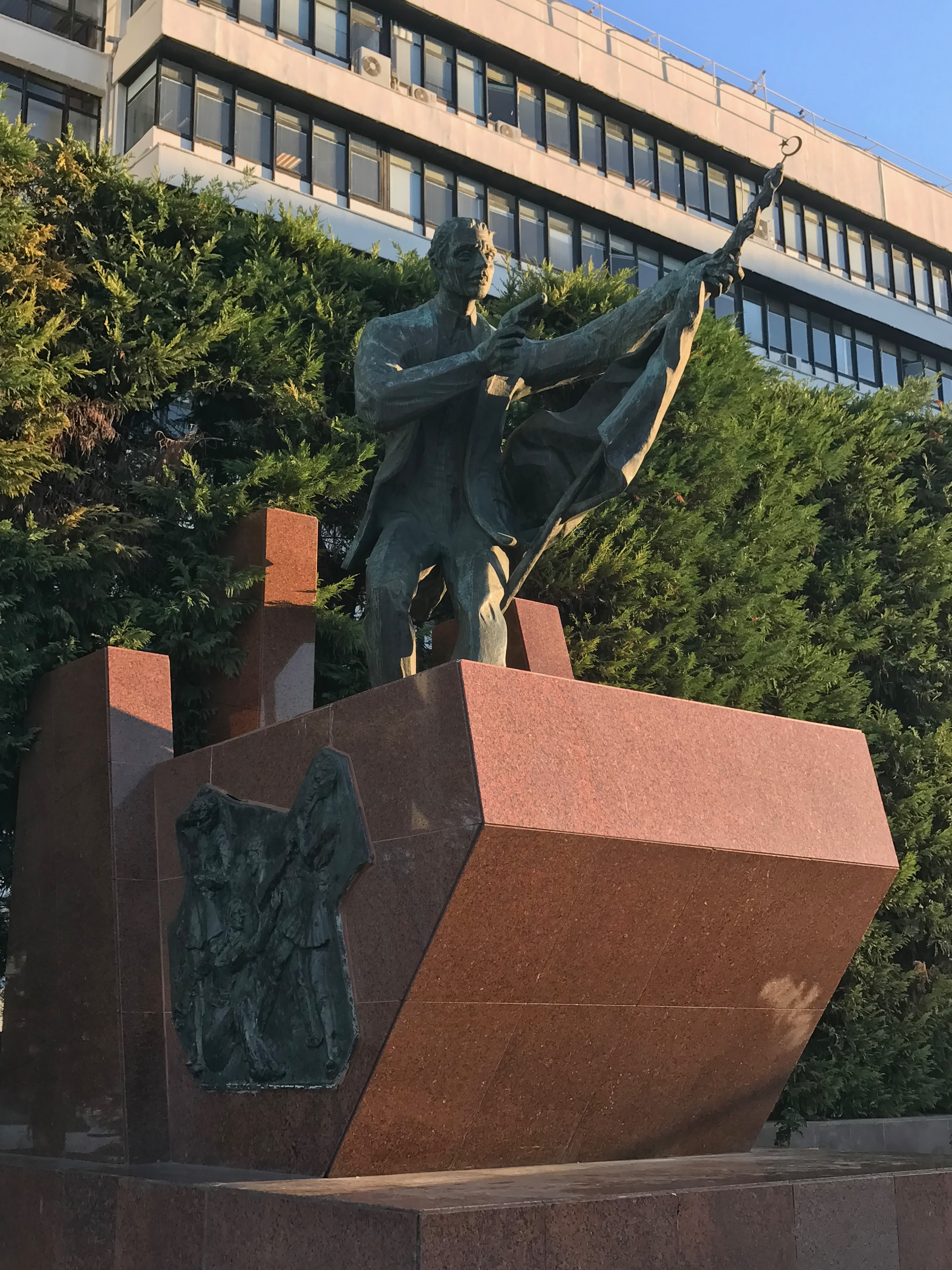
- First Bullet Monument of Hasan Tahsin
- Interactive map of First Bullet Monument
- Location: İzmir, Turkey
- Coordinates: 38°25′12″N 27°07′42″E
- Designer: Turgut Pura; Harbi Hotan
- Type: Statue
- Material: Granite; Marble
- Opening date: 15 May 1974
- Dedicated to: Hasan Tahsin

The First Bullet Monument is a monument in İzmir, Turkey dedicated to Hasan Tahsin, the Turkish War of Independence, and the Occupation of Smyrna. The monument depicts journalist Hasan Tahsin holding a gun in his right hand and a flag in his left. Both sides of the monument represent murals of the people of the Turkish War of Independence.

== History ==
Hasan Tahsin was a Turkish journalist who on 15 May 1919 showed resistance to the occupying Greek forces. He was shot and killed by the occupying Greek forces at Konak Square in Izmir, thereby making it an important event in the Turkish War of Independence.

Petitions started as early as 1972 and were successfully executed in 1974 with the aid of the Union of Journalists in Izmir (İzmir Gazeticiler Derneği) and the local community in Izmir.

The podium was designed by architect Harbi Hotan, whereas sculptor Turgut Pora was responsible for the statue.

== Incidents ==
On 22 September 2022, two minors stole one of the reliefs mounted at the podium of the statue. However, with the aid of the local community, both perpetrators were apprehended shortly thereafter and the relief after repairing the minor damages mounted to its rightful place.
