= Allahdad Massacre =

1839 pogrom in Iran

- Mashhad (Iran)
- Location: Mashhad, Qajar Iran
- Date: 1839
- Target: Iranian Jews
- Attack type: Pogrom, forced conversion
- Deaths: 30–40
- Perpetrator: Iranian Muslims

The Allahdad (Persian: الله داد, lit. 'God's Justice') was an 1839 pogrom perpetrated by Muslims against the Iranian Jewish community in the city of Mashhad, Qajar Iran. It was characterized by the mass-killing and forced conversion of the Jews in the area to Islam. Following this event, the Jews who stayed in Mashad began to actively practice crypto-Judaism while superficially adhering to Islamic beliefs.

While there had been previously been forced conversions and pogroms against Persian Jews in cities such as Shiraz, Isfahan, and Barforush, the Allahdad pogrom was a prominent event in the ambivalent history of Jewish–Muslim relations because an entire community of Jews were forced to convert, and it was one of the first times European Jews intervened on behalf of Iranian Jews.

The event was first described in Joseph Wolff's 1845 travelogue "Narrative of a mission to Bokhara", in which he wrote:

On Monday, the 11th of March, I arrived at Askerea, two miles distant from Meshed. I had sent on before the King's mehmoondar, and the gholam of the British embassy. The first who came to meet me was Mullah Mehdee (Meshiakh), the Jew with whom I had lodged twelve years ago, and who treated me most hospitably when in distress and misery and poverty, previous to the arrival of Abbas Mirza at Meshed, from Nishapoor. All the Jews of Meshed, a hundred and fifty families, were compelled seven years ago, to turn Mussulmans. The occasion was as follows: A poor woman had a sore hand; a Mussulman physician advised her to kill a dog and put her hand in the blood of it; she did so; when suddenly the whole population rose, and said that they had done it in derision of their Prophet. Thirty-five Jews were killed in a few minutes; the rest, struck with terror, became Muhammedans ; and fanatic and covetous Muhammedans shouted, "Light of Muhammed has fallen upon them!" They are now more zealous Jews in secret than ever; but call themselves, like the Jews in Spain, Anusim, "the compelled ones!" Their children cannot suppress their feelings when their parents call them by their Muhammedan names! But Mullah Mehdee and Mullah Moshe believe in Christ, and Mullah Mehdee asked me to baptize him. He has been of the greatest use to the English in Heraut and Candahar, as his testimonials from Rawlinson and others amply testify.

In another narrative of the same event this incident happened during the Shia holy month on Muharram. The Shias were marching in the streets in memory of Hussein ibn Ali when the Jewish woman was throwing away the dog she killed for medical reasons. She was accused of deliberately offending the shi'is.

Still another narrative reports that the dog was only a pretext and the conflict was because of earlier confrontations between a Sayyid (descendant of Muhammad) and the Jews who did not want to pay him for the husainia he built near the Jewish commercial shops.

In any case, the recommendation by a Muslim physician seems unlikely as both Islamic and Jewish laws would consider dog's blood to be impure.

Mashhad's ruler had ordered his men to enter Jewish homes and mobs attacked the Jewish community, burning down the synagogue, looting homes, abducting girls, and killing between 30 and 40 people. With knives held to their throats, the Jewish patriarchs were forced to vocally proclaim their "allegiance" to Islam as it was agreed upon by the leaders of the community that in order to save the remaining 2,400 Jews, everyone must convert. Most converted and stayed in Mashhad, taking on Muslim names, while some left for other Iranian Jewish communities and to Afghanistan. That day became known as the Allahdad ("God's Justice").

This event might also be understood in larger Jewish-Persian relations. Some of the Jews of Mashhad, including the chief of the local Jewish community, Mullah Mahdi Aqajan, served as agents of the British government. This fact in addition to recent withdrawal of Iran from Herat in 1838 under diplomatic pressure from the British government, created an increasingly hostile atmosphere towards the Jews in Mashhad. Moses Montefiore, the head of British Jewry at the time, intervened on behalf of the Mashhad community. Jews were allowed to return to Judaism under the terms of a decree by Mohammad Shah Qajar four years after the massacre, the Jews in Mashhad were unable to practice their religion, given the city's religious status. Most Jews in Mashhad, fearing the anger of the local population, decided to live outwardly as Muslims and living as crypto-Jews. On the outside, they acted as Muslims: their clothes, names, and lifestyles resembled those of their Iranian neighbors. At home, however, they secretly taught their children to read Hebrew, lit candles, and observed Shabbat.

A group of Persian Jewish refugees from Mashhad, escaping persecution back home in Qajar Iran, settled in the Sikh Empire around the year 1839. Most of the Jewish families settled in Rawalpindi (specifically in the Babu Mohallah neighbourhood) and Peshawar in present-day Pakistan.

Others fled to Jewish communities nearby in Bukhara, Samarkand, Kabul, Herat where the majority of the Muslims were Sunni and more tolerant of the Jews than the Shiites.

Mashhad's Jews were able to start practicing their faith openly with the coming of the more liberal Pahlavi dynasty (1925–1979), nearly 100 years after the massacre. After World War II, most of them settled in Tehran, Israel, or New York City, with 4,000 moving to the United States, where many ran successful jewelry and carpet businesses. The commercial district in Great Neck, New York, has been reshaped to serve the needs of Mashhadis and other Iranian Jews. Many businesses there cater to Iranian customs and taste.

Worldwide there are 20,000 Mashhadis, of which about 10,000 live in Israel.

== See also ==
- Antisemitism in Islam
- Shiraz pogrom
- Anusim
- Chala
- Converso
- Dönmeh
- Banu Israil
- History of the Jews in Iran
- History of the Jews under Muslim rule
- Islamic–Jewish relations
- Marrano
- Neofiti
- Religious antisemitism
- Xuetes
- Yu Aw Synagogue
