= Marrano =

Jews from the Iberian Peninsula forcibly converted to Catholicism

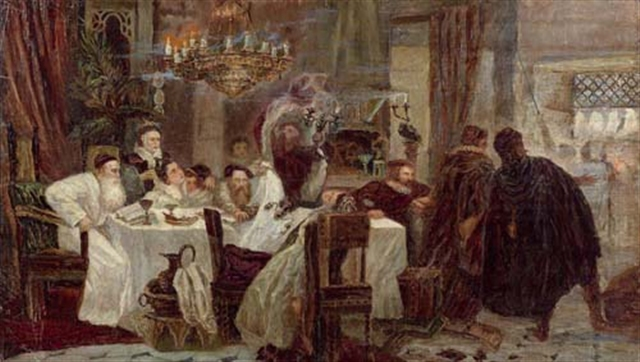
Marranos: A secret Passover Seder in Spain during the times of Inquisition. An 1893 painting by Moshe Maimon.

Marranos (Spanish pronunciation: [maˈranos], Portuguese pronunciation: [mɐˈʁɐnuʃ]) were Spanish and Portuguese Jews, as well as Navarrese Jews, who converted to Christianity, either voluntarily or by Spanish or Portuguese royal coercion, during the fifteenth and sixteenth centuries, but who continued to practice Judaism in secret or were suspected of it. They are also called crypto-Jews, a term increasingly preferred in scholarly works over Marranos.

The related term converso was used for the wider population of Jewish converts to Catholicism, whether or not they secretly still practised Jewish rites. Converts from either Judaism or Islam were referred to by the more general term "New Christians".

The term marrano came into use in 1492 with the Castilian Alhambra Decree, which prohibited the practice of Judaism in Spain and required all remaining Jews to convert or leave. The vast majority of Jews in Spain had already converted to Catholicism, perhaps under pressure from the Massacre of 1391, and conversos numbered in the hundreds of thousands. Suspected by Old Christians of the secret practice of Judaism, the Spanish Inquisition, established prior to the decree, surveilled New Christians to try to detect whether their conversion to Christianity was sincere.

In modern Spanish, marrano means "pig", or, more often, "dirty person". For this reason, although its etymology is contested, present-day use of the term can be considered pejorative and offensive. Some scholars, however, continue to use marrano interchangeably with crypto-Jew, or otherwise converso.

== Etymology ==
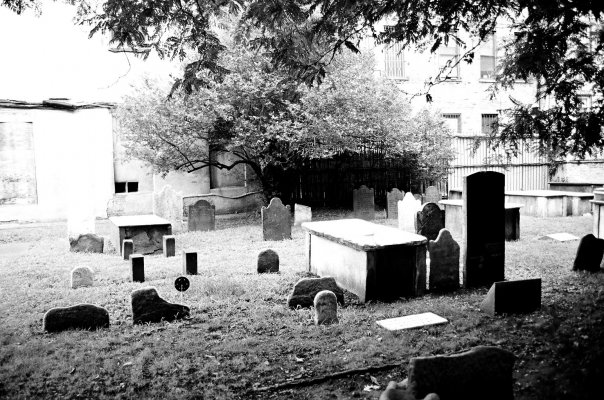
First Cemetery of the Spanish and Portuguese Synagogue, Shearith Israel (1656–1833), in Manhattan, New York City

The origin of the term Marrano as applied to crypto-Jews is unclear, since there have been several proposed etymologies in addition to swine.

The Hebrew word for מְשֻׁמָּד Meshumad, literally standing for "self-destroyed" or a heretic to Judaism, for a Jew who deliberately rebels against the observance of Jewish law.

The main difference between a Min, a Meshumad, and the Anusim is that the act of abandonment of Judaism is voluntary for a Min and a Meshumad, while for the Anusim it is not.

One source of the term derives from an Arabic word for "forbidden, illicit", مُحَرّمٌ Muḥarram. The Arabic word in this context means "swine" or "pork", and either expresses the same repulsion towards the converts that the converts previously had for such ritually unclean meat.

However, as applied to Crypto-Jews, the term Marrano derives from the Spanish and Portuguese verb "marrar" and "amarrar" meaning "to fail", "to plan to go wrong", "to break away", "to defraud", "to target", "to tie up", "to refrain", "to deviate", "to clinch", "to moor", illuminating that those targeted and forced by the Spanish Crown had no choice but to adopt Christianity, either leave the Kingdom of Spain all while the Crown seized their property and money and gave them no support to leave, be murdered either for not showing complete loyalty to Christianity or for leaving Spain and coming back showing that these Jews were traitors to the Spanish Crown.

It also has Arabic origin meaning "to deviate" or "to err", in the sense that they deviated from their newly adopted faith by secretly continuing to practice Judaism. A third origin has been cited from Galician-Portuguese, where marrar means "to force" and marrano means "forced one", indicating the compulsory nature of the religious conversions. José Meir Estrugo Hazán writes in his book Los Sefardíes that "marrano" is the term the Spanish Jews prefer.

== Demographics ==
Under state pressure in the late 14th and early 15th century, over half of Jews in the Iberian Peninsula converted to Christianity, thus avoiding the Decree of Expulsion which affected Spain's remaining openly Jewish population in 1492. The numbers who converted and the effects of various migrations in and out of the area have been the subject of historical debate. A phylogeographic study in 2008 of 1,150 volunteer Y-chromosome DNA haplogroups appeared to support the idea that the number of conversions has been significantly underestimated, as 20% of the tested Iberian population had haplogroups consistent with Sephardi ancestry. This percentage was suggested as representing the proportion of Sephardi in the population at the time of mass conversions in the 14th and 15th centuries. However, the authors concede that other historical population movements from the Near East such as Syrians and Phoenicians may also account for these results.

== Portugal ==
Some Portuguese conversos or cristãos-novos continued to practice as crypto-Jews. In the early 20th century, historian Samuel Schwartz wrote about crypto-Jewish communities discovered in northeastern Portugal (namely, Belmonte, Bragança, Miranda, and Chaves). He claimed that members had managed to survive more than four centuries without being fully assimilated into the Old Christian population. The last remaining crypto-Jewish community in Belmonte officially returned to Judaism in the 1970s and opened a synagogue in 1996. In 2003, the American Sephardi Federation founded the Belmonte Project to raise funds to acquire Judaic educational material and services for the Belmonte community, who then numbered 160–180.

Two documentary films have been made in north-eastern Portugal where present-day descendants of marranos were interviewed about their lives. In 1974 for The Marranos of Portugal, the Israel Broadcasting Authority (IBA) sent reporter Ron Ben-Yishai to conduct interviews with families about their religious practice. After being asked to prove he knew Hebrew before they would talk, he found people still reluctant to speak openly. Nevertheless, he did eventually gain a remarkable insight into their version of Jewish customs, prayers and songs. The film was commended at the 1976 Jerusalem Jewish Film and TV Festival. Another documentary, The Last Marranos, was made by the New York Jewish Media Fund in 1997.

After the expulsion of Jews and Muslims from Spain (1492) and the Forced Conversion by Portugal's King Manuel I in Portugal (1497), conversos continued to be suspect in socially strained times. In Lisbon in 1506, a months-long plague caused people to look for scapegoats. Some became suspicious that conversos might be practicing Judaism and therefore be at fault. On April 17, 1506, several conversos were discovered who had in their possession "some lambs and poultry prepared according to Jewish custom; also unleavened bread and bitter herbs according to the regulations for the Passover, which festival they celebrated far into the night." Officials seized several but released them after a few days.

On the same day on which the conversos were freed, the Dominicans displayed a crucifix and a reliquary in glass from which a peculiar light issued in a side-chapel of their church, where several New Christians were present. A New Christian who tried to explain the miracle as due to natural causes was dragged from the church and killed by an infuriated woman. A Dominican roused the populace still more. Friar João Mocho and the Aragonese friar Bernardo, crucifix in hand, were said to have gone through the streets of the city, crying "Heresy!" and calling upon the people to destroy the conversos. Attracted by the outcry, sailors from Holland, Zeeland and others from ships in the port of Lisbon, joined the Dominicans and formed a mob with local men to pursue the conversos.

The mob dragged converso victims from their houses and killed some. Old Christians who were in any way associated with New Christians were also attacked. The mob attacked the tax-farmer João Rodrigo Mascarenhas, a New Christian; although a wealthy and distinguished man, his work also made him resented by many. They demolished his house. Within 48 hours, many "conversos" were killed; by the third day all who could leave escaped, often with the help of other Portuguese. The killing spree lasted from 19 to 21 April, in what came to be known as the Lisbon massacre.

King Manuel severely punished those who took part in the killings. The ringleaders and the Dominicans who encouraged the riot were also executed. Local people convicted of murder or pillage suffered corporal punishment and their property was confiscated. The king granted religious freedom for 20 years to all conversos in an attempt at compensation. Lisbon lost Foral (municipal) privileges. The foreigners who had taken part generally escaped punishment, leaving with their ships.

New Christians were attacked in Gouveia, Alentejo, Olivença, Santarém, and other places. In the Azores and the island of Madeira, mobs massacred former Jews. Because of these excesses, the king began to believe that a Portuguese Inquisition might help control such outbreaks.

The Portuguese conversos worked to forestall such actions, and spent immense sums to win over the Curia and most influential cardinals. Spanish and Portuguese conversos made financial sacrifices. Alfonso Gutiérrez, Garcia Alvarez "el Rico" (the rich), and the Zapatas, conversos from Toledo, offered 80,000 gold crowns to Holy Roman Emperor Charles V, if he would mitigate the harshness of the Inquisition.

The Mendes of Lisbon and Flanders also tried to help. None was successful in preventing the Inquisition Papal Bull Meditatio Cordis of 16 July 1547, Inquisition in Portugal. This Bull Meditatio Cordis still did not have the "Power of Confiscation". Portuguese Marranos continued, with many bribes of the Popes in Rome, and with prolonged negotiation against this "Power of Confiscation" succeeded to delay it 32 years, but finally conceded this "deadly weapon" in 1579. The Portuguese Inquisition now had been endowed, 101 years after the Spanish Inquisition of 1 November 1478, with the same extremities of rigour as the Spanish prototype. The conversos suffered immensely both from mob violence and interrogation and testing by the Inquisition. Attacks and murders were recorded at Trancoso, Lamego, Miranda, Viseu, Guarda, and Braga.

At Covilhã, there were rumours that the people planned to massacre all the New Christians on one day. In 1562, prelates petitioned the Cortes to require conversos to wear special badges, and to order Jewish descendants to live in ghettos (judiarias) in cities and villages as their ancestors had before the conversions.

In 1641, João IV of Portugal ennobled the Curiel family, a Marrano family who initially served the Crown of Castile, defecting to Portugal after the expulsion of the Jews from Spain in 1498. They went on serving the King of Portugal in diplomatic positions across Europe until the late 18th century.

In the 1970s, the Marranos of Belmonte officially rejoined Judaism and reestablished ties with the Jews of Israel. The Museu Judaico de Belmonte was opened in 2005 in Belmonte, it is the first Jewish museum in Portugal.

== Spain ==
According to historian Cecil Roth, Spanish political intrigues had earlier promoted the anti-Jewish policies which culminated in 1391, when Regent Queen Leonora of Castile gave the Archdeacon of Écija, Ferrand Martinez, considerable power in her realm. Martinez gave speeches that led to violence against the Jews, and this influence culminated in the sack of the Jewish quarter of Seville on June 4, 1391. Throughout Spain during this year, the cities of Ecija, Carmona, Córdoba, Toledo, Barcelona and many others saw their Jewish quarters destroyed and inhabitants massacred.

It is estimated that 200,000 Jews saved their lives by converting to Christianity in the wake of these persecutions. Other Jews left the country altogether and around 100,000 openly practicing Jews remained.

In 1449, feelings rose against conversos, breaking out in a riot at Toledo. Instigated by two canons, Juan Alfonso and Pedro Lopez Galvez, the mob plundered and burned the houses of Alonso Cota, a wealthy converso and tax-farmer. They also attacked the residences of wealthy New Christians in the quarter of la Magdelena. Under Juan de la Cibdad, the conversos opposed the mob, but were repulsed. They were executed with their leader. As a result, several prominent converso men were deposed from office, in obedience to a new statute.

Nearly 20 years later in July 1467, another riot occurred where a mob attacked conversos in Toledo. The chief magistrate (alcalde mayor) of the city was Alvar Gomez de Cibdad Real, who had been private secretary to King Henry IV of Castile. He was a protector of the conversos. Together with prominent conversos Fernando and Alvaro de la Torre, Alvar wished to take revenge for an insult by the counts de Fuensalida, leaders of the Old Christians. His intention was to seize control of the city, but fierce conflict erupted. Opponents set fire to houses of New Christians near the cathedral. The conflagration spread so rapidly that 1,600 houses were consumed. Both Old Christians and conversos perished. The brothers De la Torre were captured and hanged.

Tensions arose in Córdoba between Old Christians and conversos, where they formed two hostile parties. On 14 March 1473, during a dedication procession, a girl accidentally threw dirty water from the window of the house of one of the wealthiest conversos (the customary way to dispose of it.) The water splashed on an image of the Virgin being carried in procession in honor of a new society (from which conversos had been excluded by Bishop D. Pedro.) A local blacksmith started arousing a rabble against the Jews, who he blamed for the insult, which immediately joined in a fierce shout for revenge.

The mob went after conversos, denouncing them as heretics, killing them, and burning their houses. To stop the excesses, the highly respected D. Alonso Fernandez de Aguilar, whose wife was a member of the converso family of Pacheco, together with his brother D. Gonzalo Fernández de Córdoba ("El Gran Capitán"), and a troop of soldiers, hastened to protect the New Christians. D. Alonso called upon the mob to retire. Its leader insulted the count, who immediately felled him with his lance. Aroused, the people considered him a martyr. Incited by Alonso de Aguilar's enemy, they again attacked the conversos. The rioting lasted three days. Those who escaped sought refuge in the castle, where their protectors also took shelter. The government decreed that Jews and conversos should remain in their neighborhood or leave the city.

In 1473, attacks on conversos arose in numerous other cities: Montoro, Bujalance, Adamuz, La Rambla, Santaella, and elsewhere. Mobs attacked conversos in Andújar, Úbeda, Baeza, and Almodóvar del Campo also. In Valladolid, groups looted the belongings of the New Christians. At Segovia, there was a massacre (May 16, 1474). D. Juan Pacheco, a converso, led the attacks. Without the intervention of the alcalde, Andres de Cabrera, all New Christians might have died. At Carmona, it was reported that not one converso was left alive.

=== Inquisition ===
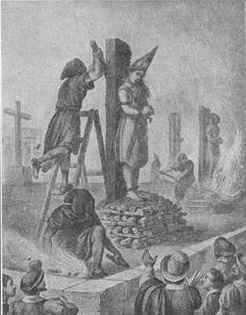
Execution of Mariana de Carabajal in Mexico, 1601.

Tens of thousands of Jews were baptised in the three months before the deadline for expulsion, some 40,000 if one accepts the totals given by Kamen: most of these undoubtedly to avoid expulsion, rather than as a sincere change of faith. These conversos were the principal concern of the Inquisition; being suspected of continuing to practice Judaism put them at risk of denunciation and trial.

During 1492, about 12,000 conversos entered Navarre from Aragon's repression, where they were allowed to remain. Tudela in Navarre turned into a converso haven. The Tudelans had already proclaimed in 1486 that "if any inquisitor enters their city, he will be thrown into the Ebro river." Later the resistance to the inquisitors was so strong that its aldermen ordered commissioners and attorneys to ask the Catholic Monarchs to limit the power of the Inquisition in 1510.

The most intense period of persecution of conversos lasted until 1530. From 1531 to 1560, however, the percentage of conversos among the Inquisition trials dropped to 3% of the total. There was a rebound of persecutions when a group of crypto-Jews was discovered in Quintanar de la Orden in 1588; and there was a rise in denunciations of conversos in the last decade of the sixteenth century. At the beginning of the seventeenth century, some conversos who had fled to Portugal began to return to Spain, fleeing the persecution of the Portuguese Inquisition, founded in 1536. This led to a rapid increase in the trials of crypto-Jews, among them a number of important financiers. In 1691, during a number of autos-da-fé in Mallorca, 37 chuetas, or conversos of Mallorca, were burned.

During the eighteenth century the number of conversos accused by the Inquisition decreased significantly. Manuel Santiago Vivar, tried in Córdoba in 1818, was the last person tried for being a crypto-Jew.

=== Converso-Jewish relations ===
The conversos of Seville and other cities of the Crown of Castile, and especially of the Crown of Aragon, bitterly opposed the Spanish Inquisition established in 1478. They rendered considerable service to the king, and held high legal, financial, and military positions. The government issued an edict directing traditional Jews to live within a ghetto and be separated from conversos. Despite the law, however, the Jews remained in communication with their New Christian brethren.

"They sought ways and means to win them from Catholicism and bring them back to Judaism. They instructed the Marranos in the tenets and ceremonies of the Jewish religion; held meetings in which they taught them what they must believe and observe according to the Mosaic law; and enabled them to circumcise themselves and their children. They furnished them with prayer-books; explained the fast-days; read with them the history of their people and their Law; announced to them the coming of the Passover; procured unleavened bread for them for that festival, as well as kosher meat throughout the year; encouraged them to live in conformity with the law of Moses, and persuaded them that there was no law and no truth except the Jewish religion." These were the charges brought by the government of Ferdinand II of Aragon and Isabella I of Castile against the Jews. They constituted the grounds for their expulsion and banishment in 1492, so they could not subvert conversos. Jews who did not want to leave Spain had to accept baptism as a sign of conversion.

The historian Henry Kamen's Inquisition and Society in Spain in the sixteenth and seventeenth centuries questions whether there were such strong links between conversos and Jewish communities. Whilst historians such as Yitzhak Baer state, "the conversos and Jews were one people", Kamen claims, "Yet if the conversos were hated by the Christians, the Jews liked them no better." He documented that "Jews testified falsely against them [the conversos] when the Inquisition was finally founded." This issue is being debated by historians.

== Conversos in Italy ==
Although the vast majority of Spain's 250,000 conversos had abandoned Judaism and been assimilated into Spain's dominant Catholic culture, many of those continuing to secretly practice their former religion felt threatened and persecuted by the Inquisition which continued to actively persecute heresy. Some of these chose to leave Spain, in bands or as individual refugees. Many migrated to Italy, attracted by the climate, which resembled that of the Iberian Peninsula, and by the kindred language. When they settled at Ferrara, Duke Ercole I d'Este granted them privileges. His son Alfonso confirmed the privileges to twenty-one Spanish conversos: physicians, merchants, and others (ib. xv. 113 et seq.). A thoroughly researched history of these migrations is also contained in the book about one of their leaders Dona Gracia Nasi called, "The Woman Who Defied Kings", by the historian and journalist Andree Aelion Brooks.

Spanish and Portuguese conversos also settled at Florence and contributed to make Livorno a leading seaport. They received privileges at Venice, where they were protected from the persecutions of the Inquisition. In Milan they materially advanced the interests of the city with their industry and commerce. At Bologna, Pisa, Naples, and numerous other Italian cities, they freely exercised the Jewish religion again. They were soon so numerous that Fernando de Goes Loureiro, an abbot from Porto, filled an entire book with the names of conversos who had drawn large sums from Portugal and had openly avowed Judaism in Italy.

In Piedmont, Duke Emmanuel Philibert of Savoy welcomed conversos from Coímbra and granted them commercial and industrial privileges, as well as the free exercise of their religion. Rome was full of conversos. Pope Paul III received them at Ancona for commercial reasons. He granted complete liberty "to all persons from Portugal and Algarve, even if belonging to the class of New Christians." By 1553 three thousand Portuguese Jews and conversos were living at Ancona.

Two years later, Pope Paul IV issued orders to have all the conversos in Papal states be thrown into the prisons of the Inquisition which he had instituted. Sixty of them, who acknowledged the Catholic faith as penitents, were transported to the island of Malta; twenty-four, who adhered to Judaism, were publicly burned (May 1556). Those who escaped the Inquisition were received at Pesaro by Guidobaldo II della Rovere, Duke of Urbino. Guidobaldo had hoped to have the Jews and conversos of Turkey select Pesaro as a commercial centre; when that did not happen, he expelled the New Christians from Pesaro and other districts in 1558 (ib. xvi. 61 et seq.).

Many conversos also went to Dubrovnik, formerly a considerable Croatian seaport on the Adriatic Sea. In May 1544, a ship landed there filled with Portuguese refugees.

== Latin America ==
During the 16th and 17th centuries, some conversos migrated to the Americas, often the Castilian territories of the Vice-royalties of New Spain, Peru, and the Río de la Plata in Argentina. Legal emigration to the New World was strictly controlled and required proof of three generations of Christian ascendance. Nevertheless, many conversos managed to evade these restrictions and managed to obtain "encomiendas" papers of legal identity in the New World.

== France ==
According to Isidore Loeb, in a special study of the subject in the Revue des Études Juives (xiv. 162–183), about 3,000 Jews came to Provence after the Alhambra Decree expelled Jews from Spain in 1492.

From 1484, one town after another had called for expulsion, but the calls were rejected by Charles VIII. However, Louis XII, in one of his first acts as king in 1498, issued a general expulsion order of the Jews of Provence. Though not enforced at the time, the order was renewed in 1500 and again in 1501. On this occasion, it was definitively implemented. The Jews of Provence were given the option of conversion to Christianity and a number chose that option. However, after a short while – if only to compensate partially for the loss of revenues caused by the departure of the Jews – the king imposed a special tax, referred to as "the tax of the neophytes." These converts and their descendants soon became the objects of social discrimination and slanders.

== Estado da India (Portuguese India) ==
In the "Marrano Factory: The Portuguese Inquisition and Its New Christians 1536-1765", Professor Antonio Jose Saraiva of the University of Lisbon, writes "King Manuel theoretically abolished discrimination between Old and New Christians by the law of March 1, 1507 which permitted the departure of New Christians to any part of the Christian world, declaring that they “be considered, favored and treated like the Old Christians and not distinct and separated from them in any matter.” Nevertheless, in apparent contradiction to that law, in a letter dated Almeirim, February 18, 1519, King Manuel promoted legislation henceforth prohibiting the naming of New Christians to the position of judge, town councillor or municipal registrar in Goa, stipulating, however, that those already appointed were not to be dismissed. This shows that even during the first nine years of Portuguese rule, Goa had a considerable influx of recently baptised Spanish and Portuguese Jews."

Some New Christians sought to re-join Jewish populations in India (particularly through the Jewish community in Cochin), while others went on to be extremely influential in the spice trade, and the gems trade between Portugal, and India. This activity aroused the ire of the Catholic clergy. During this period, the first bishop of Goa, Gaspar Jorge de Leão Pereira wrote his anti-Semitic work "contra os Judeos" (tracts against Jews), and called for the establishment of the Inquisition in Goa (which was established in 1560).

== Migrations ==
There was no significant wave of emigration of conversos from Spain, the majority of Sephardic communities, such as that of Salonika having been formed as a result of the Alhambra Decree in 1492. However, there was a steady trickle of crypto-Jewish marranos who wished to practice their faith freely to more liberal environments. One of their leaders who helped them get there was the Lisbon-born international banker, Gracia Mendes Nasi. They also migrated to Flanders, where they were attracted by its flourishing cities, such as Antwerp and Brussels. Conversos from Flanders, and others direct from the Iberian Peninsula, went under the guise of Catholics to Hamburg and Altona about 1580, where they established a community and held commercial relations with their former homes. Some migrated as far as Scotland. Christian IV of Denmark invited some New Christian families to settle at Glückstadt about 1626, granting certain privileges to them and to conversos who came to Emden about 1649.

The vast majority of Spain's conversos, however, remained in Spain and Portugal and were suspected of "Marranism" by the Spanish Inquisition. Although the wealthier among them could easily bypass discriminatory Limpieza de sangre laws, they constituted a significant portion of the over three thousand people executed for heresy by the Spanish Inquisition. In his luminous book the "Marrano Factory: The Portuguese Inquisition and Its New Christians 1536-1765", Professor Antonio Jose Saraiva of the University of Lisbon, writes that "After August 1531, when the establishment of the Inquisition in Portugal was in the offing and especially after June 14, 1532 when New Christian emigration from Portugal became a capital offense, anti-New Christian sentiment surged on all sides. The New Christians were panic-stricken and emigrants, legal or clandestine, headed for Flanders, Italy, the Ottoman Empire, the Portuguese possessions in India, North Africa. After the middle of the century, England, France, the Spanish Americas and Brazil were the favorite destinations, not necessarily in that order." The New Christians breathed more freely when Philip III of Spain came to the throne. By the law of April 4, 1601, he granted them the privilege of unrestricted sale of their real estate as well as free departure from the country for themselves, their families, and their property. Many, availing themselves of this permission, followed their coreligionists to North Africa and Turkey. After a few years, however, the privilege was revoked, and the Inquisition resumed its activity.

Some migrated to London, whence their families spread to Brazil (where conversos had settled at an early date) and other colonies in the Americas. Migrations to Constantinople and Thessaloniki, where Jewish refugees had settled after the expulsion from Spain, as well as to Italy, Serbia, Romania, Bulgaria, Vienna, and Timișoara, continued into the middle of the 18th century.

== Modern-day ==
Late 20th century political and social changes in Spain caused reappraisal of Jewish and Muslim contributions to its culture. There has been much new scholarship on Sephardic Jews, Moors and the consequences of conversion and expulsion. In addition, there have been official governmental efforts to welcome tourists of both ancestries to Spain. Towns and regions have worked to preserve elements of Jewish and Moorish pasts.

In Spanish Civil Code Art. 22.1, the government created concessions to nationals of several countries and Sephardi Jews historically linked with Spain allowing them to seek citizenship after five years rather than the customary ten required for residence in Spain. Later it was dropped to two years. In November 2012, the residency requirement was eliminated. In October 2006, the Parliament of Andalusia asked the three parliamentary groups that form the majority to support an amendment that would similarly ease the way for nationals of Morisco descent to gain Spanish citizenship. The proposal was originally made by IULV-CA, the Andalusian branch of the United Left.

In 2004, Shlomo Moshe Amar travelled to Portugal to celebrate the centennial anniversary of the Lisbon Synagogue "Shaare Tikvah". During his stay, Shlomo Moshe Amar met descendants of Jewish families persecuted by the Inquisition who still practice Judaism at the house of rabbi Boaz Pash. This was an historical meeting that had not happened between a Chief Rabbi and Portuguese Bnei Anusim in centuries. Rabbi Shlomo Moshe Amar promised to create a committee to evaluate the Halachic situation of the community. The delay of the Chief Rabbi to create the committee and help the descendants of Sephardi Jews in Portugal forced the creation of a second Jewish community in Lisbon, Comunidade Judaica Masorti Beit Israel, to ensure the recognition of the Bnei Anusim as Jews.

== In literature ==
- Richard Zimler, The Last Kabbalist of Lisbon, The Overlook Press, ISBN 9781585670222
- Richard Zimler, Hunting Midnight, Delacorte, ISBN 9780385336444
- Richard Zimler, Guardian of the Dawn, Constable & Robinson, ISBN 9781845290917
- Antonio Muñoz Molina, Sepharad, Harvest Books, ISBN 9780156034746
- David Liss, The Coffee Trader, Abacus, ISBN 978-0349115009

== See also ==
=== Jews in Iberia ===
- Anusim
- Conversos
- Crypto-Judaism
- Spanish and Portuguese Jews
- History of the Jews in Belmonte
- History of the Jews in Portugal
- History of the Jews in Spain
- New Christian
- Xueta
- Vaez

=== Related groups and concepts ===
- Neofiti
- Luis de Carvajal y de la Cueva
- History of the Jews under Muslim rule
- Chala
- Dönmeh
- Banu Israil
- Allahdad
- Linobambaki
- Judaizers
- Falash Mura
- Kakure Kirishitan
