= Vaez family =

Jewish family of Lisbon

The Vaez family was a prominent Jewish family of Lisbon, whose foremost members, the four brothers Immanuel, Pedro, Ayres, and Salvador, resided in Portugal as Marranos during the sixteenth century. The family included several Jewish scholars and physicians for the royal family.

== Family ==
=== Abraham Vaez ===
Abraham Vaez was a hakham of the Portuguese congregation in Bayonne during the latter half of the seventeenth century. He was the author of a work on Jewish ritual laws entitled Arbol de Vidas, to which was appended a lengthy treatise on rituals by Abraham Rodriguez Faro (Amsterdam, 1692). He also wrote several sermons on the Pentateuch, and a number of ethical treatises, which were collected under the title Discursos Predicables y Avisos Espirituales and published, at the expense of his son Jacob Vaez, by Isaac Aboab (Amsterdam, 1710), who himself wrote a long introduction.

=== Ayres Vaez ===
Ayres Vaez was a physician to John III of Portugal. He died in Rome about the middle of the sixteenth century. At the request of the King of Fez, with whom John, however, was not on terms of amity, Vaez was sent to Africa, where he succeeded in curing the monarch of a dangerous illness. Upon his return to Lisbon, Vaez devoted himself to the study of astronomy and astrology. In consequence of predicting to the king and queen the death of one of their children, a prediction which was fulfilled, he lost the royal favor. Thinking to regain the king's confidence, Vaez declared, in the course of a discussion, that astrology was an unreliable mode of divination, and that its practise was foolish and irreligious. The king, who had recently read a treatise expressing similar views, delivered Vaez to the Inquisition, charging him with being a heretic and a secret Jew. Vaez was ordered to defend himself before the inquisitors, and later to engage in a disputation with the theologian Sorao; but Capodiferro, the papal nuncio, succeeded in removing him from the jurisdiction of the Inquisition, and sent him to Rome to be tried by the Curia. Pope Paul III, who was himself a believer in astrology, not only set Vaez at liberty, but even issued a bull (June 6, 1541) protecting the entire Vaez family, as well as the lawyers who had defended Ayres Vaez, against the Inquisition.

=== Daniel Vaez ===
Daniel Vaez was a Portuguese scholar who flourished at Amsterdam in the seventeenth century. Together with Joseph Athias, he published a prayer-book entitled Orden de las Oraciones del Todo el Anno (Amsterdam, 1677).

=== Immanuel Vaez ===
Immanuel Vaez was a physician and the eldest of the Vaez brothers. According to the account of Rodrigo de Castro (De Universa Mulierum Morborum Medicina, ii. 47, 332, Hamburg, 1603), who was his nephew, and who settled in Hamburg in the sixteenth century, Immanuel was appointed physician to four kings of Portugal—John III., Sebastian, Henry, and Philip II. He won this distinction by virtue of his erudition and the experience which he had gathered in his extensive travels.

=== Pedro Vaez ===
Pedro Vaez was a physician at Covilhã, Portugal; second in age of the Vaez brothers. He is repeatedly mentioned in the Medicorum Principum Historia of Abraham Zacuto.

=== Salvador Vaez ===
Salvador Vaez was the youngest of the Vaez brothers. He served as a page to the papal nuncio Hieronymo Ricenati Capodiferro in Lisbon, and was able to interest the prelate in the case of his brother Ayres, and to induce him to interfere in the latter's behalf. The result was that after the sessions of the Inquisition had begun, Salvador suddenly entered the hall and declared the sitting dissolved by order of the nuncio. Later he probably accompanied Capodiferro to Rome.

=== Eleanore Vaez ===
Eleanore Vaez was a sister to the above. She married Dr David Namias de Castro also known as Andreas Fernandez. Cir 1544. They had two children Francisco Namias de Castro (1545 Lisbon) and Dr David Namias de Castro also known as Rodrigo Namias (c 1546 Lisbon - Feb 1627 Hamburg)
