= Mashhadi Jews =

Iranian Jewish community

The Jewish community of Mashhad, Iran (Persian: یهودیان مشهد) was formed in the 1740s. After the Allahdad pogrom, members emigrated to escape persecution and are now located around the world.

== History ==
Iranian Jews are considered to be the descendants of 722 BCE Assyrian and 586 BCE Babylonian exiles. From this diaspora, a smaller tribe of Jews evolved, in part due to their geographic setting in the city of Mashhad, and their robust community ties.

The community was founded in 1746, when Nader Shah called for the relocation of forty Jewish families from Qazvin and Dilaman to Kalat. These families settled in Mashhad, and were selected to protect Nader Shah's treasures and jewels, which he had acquired from his Indian invasion.

=== 17th Century ===
- 1650 - Safavid dynasty ruling in Iran calls to convert or kill all Iranian Jews

=== 18th century ===
- 1739 - Nader Shah of the Afsharid dynasty invades India.
- 1740 - Nader Shah brings spoils back from his Indian invasion in the form of treasures and jewels.
- 1746 - Nader Shah orders the relocation of forty Jewish families from Dilaman and Qazvin to Khorasan province for the purpose of guarding his acquired treasures and jewels. Nader Shah holds a favorable disposition towards Jews.
- 1747 - Nader Shah is assassinated. Persecution of Iranian Jews resumes. 17 of the 40 original families move to the Eydgah ghetto, Mashhad.
- 1750 - Seven of the original forty families proceed from Sabzevar and settle in Mashhad.
- 1755 - 16 of the original forty families proceed from Kalat and settled in Mashhad.

=== 19th century ===
Many Jews of Mashhad, including the chief of the local Jewish community, Mullah Mahdi Aqajan, served as agents of the British government. This fact, in addition to the recent withdrawal of Iran from Herat in 1838 under diplomatic pressure from the British government, created an increasingly hostile atmosphere towards the Jews in Mashhad.

The event which transformed this group of Iranian Jews into a community, was the Allahdad Massacre (lit. “God’s Justice”) of 1839. Rising social tensions, resentment, and suspicion by Shiite Muslims of the Jewish inhabitants of Mashhad's Eydgah ghetto culminated in an explosive event. A blood libel on the Muslim holiday Ashura led to a devastating pogrom. On 27 March 1839, an estimated 36 Jews were killed and approximately 7 Jewish girls were abducted to become Muslim child brides. Within the next 24 hours, under the risk of death, approximately 300 Jewish families made the pretence of converting to Islam, under the advisement of their community leaders. The term Allahdad was coined by the forced converts to relate their past sins with the calamity they were enduring.

Following the forced conversions, a number of Jewish families, unable to sustain the facade of Muslim faith, escaped to Herat in 1840. It is estimated that the remaining community members proceeded to live dual lives as covert Jews. During this time, the Jadid-al-Islam (lit. “New Muslims”) boasted of 2 known Sheikhs, 57 known Hajjis, and 21 known Karbalais while preserving their secret Jewish identities. Their ties to the Islamic religion were complex at times.

Starting in 1886, Mashhadi families gradually migrated to Marv and surrounding areas of Czarist Turkmenistan, in an effort to escape persecution in Mashhad and look for better business opportunities in the Russian Empire.

- 1890 - Muslim Mashhadi attempts to expose secret Jewish burial proceedings of covert Jews. A potential pogrom is averted.

In 1890, after completing the Hajj, some Mashhadi families made Aliya and travelled to Jerusalem, instead of returning from Mecca to Mashhad.

=== 20th century ===
In 1901, Haji Adonya HaCohen built the first Mashhadi Jewish synagogue in Jerusalem, followed by Haji Yehezkel's synagogue, built in 1905.

In the 1910s, some Mashhadi Jews moved to London.

In the autumn of 1917, the Russian Revolution caused the first return of Mashhadi Jews, from Marv to Mashhad. Mashhadis who remained in Russia fell prey to Stalin's “purge of petit bourgeoisie” and some members of the community were imprisoned.

In 1925, Reza Shah made an agreement with Stalin to exchange Iranian and Russian nationals. The imprisoned Mashhadis were released to return home, once again. Now, Jews were allowed to practice their religion openly. A second blood libel in 1946 resulted in the community's gradual relocation to the tolerant cities of Tehran and Jerusalem, joining the few Mashhadi families who already resided there.

Beginning in the 1940s, some Mashhadi Jews had moved to the United States (a trend which continued through the 1980s). By 1948, the Jewish population of Mashhad numbered 2,500. In the 1950s, some Mashhadi Jews moved to Germany and Italy. In 1979, Mashhadi Jews in Tehran fled during the Iranian Revolution.

=== 21st century ===
As of 2007, Jerusalem Post estimated there were about 15,000 Mashhadi Jews, with most living in New York and Israel. Mashhadi communities now exist in Israel, New York, Milan, Hamburg and London. By 2010, over 20,000 Mashhadi Jews resided in Israel, New York, Milan, Germany, and London. The PeopleGroup estimates that there are 10,000 Mashhadi Jews in the USA, mainly in Great Neck, New York.

== Practices ==
Some Mashhadi Jews married their children at young ages in order to ensure they did not marry outside the Mashhadi community.

Mashhadi Jewish marriage certificates used verses from the Qur'an. Individual certificates varied in their adherence to Muslim marriage certificate formulas.

In the modern day, Mashhadi Jews continue to marry within their own community.

== See also ==
- Chala (Jews)
- Crypto-Jews
- Iranian Jews
