= Saadia Ibn Danan =

Last Jewish rabbi of Islamic Granada (fl. 1465–1492/3)

Rabbi Saadiah ben Maimon ben Moshe ibn Danan (Hebrew: סעדיה אבן דנאן) (born 2nd half of 15th century in Granada, Spain – died 1493(?) in Oran, Algeria) was a grammarian of Hebrew and Arabic, poet and a halachic authority.

He served as a dayan in Granada and, following the expulsion of the Jews from Spain, settled in Oran with his father.

Among his works are rabbinic Responsa, a Talmudic dictionary called Sepher Arukh, works on Hebrew grammar and Hebrew verse, as well as a Hebrew dictionary written in Arabic. He was the first writer to compare Hebrew metre with its Arabic counterpart.
