= Banu Israil =

Indian Muslim community

The Banu Israil or Bani Israili are a Muslim community of Jewish origin. Their name means 'Children of Israel', and the community claims descent from the Jewish community of Madinah, in Arabia. They belong to the Shaikh caste and typically carry the surname Israily. They should not be confused with the Bene Israel, a Jewish community in western India.

== Origin ==
The exact circumstances of their settlement in India is unclear, but their traditions make clear that they were Jews at the time of their settlement. They are largely an urban community, occupying distinct quarters in a number of towns and cities in western Uttar Pradesh, such as Banu Israilyan in Aligarh. Quite a few of them occupied important administrative positions under both the Sultanate of Delhi and its successor, the Mughal Empire. This was especially true of the Banu Israil of Aligarh, where the community were the heredity kotwals, a post which entailed being both the head of police and garrison commander.

== See also ==
- Shaikh of Uttar Pradesh
- Allahdad
- Donmeh
- Chala
- Converso
- Marrano
- Neofiti
- Makhamra family
- Jewish tribes of Arabia
- Groups claiming affiliation with Israelites
