= Converso =

Jew who converted to Catholicism in Iberia

A converso (Spanish: [komˈbeɾso]; Portuguese: [kõˈvɛɾsu]; feminine form conversa, from Latin conversus 'converted, turned around') was a Jew who converted to Catholicism in Spain or Portugal, particularly during the 14th and 15th centuries, or one of their descendants.

To safeguard the Old Christian population and ensure that the converso New Christians were true to their new faith, the Holy Office of the Inquisition was established in Spain in 1478. The Catholic Monarchs of Spain Ferdinand and Isabella expelled the remaining openly practising Jews by the Alhambra Decree of 1492 following the Christian Reconquista (reconquest) of Spain. However, a significant portion of these remaining practising Jews chose to join the already large converso community rather than face exile. As a result of the Alhambra Decree, over 200,000 Jews converted to Catholicism and between 40,000 and 100,000 were expelled.

Conversos who did not fully or genuinely embrace Catholicism but continued to practise Judaism in secrecy were called judaizantes "Judaizers" and pejoratively as marranos.

New Christian converts of Muslim origin were known as Moriscos. Unlike Jewish Conversos, Moriscos were subject to an edict of expulsion even after their conversion to Catholicism, which was implemented severely in Valencia and in Aragón (and less so in other parts of Spain).

Conversos played a vital role in the 1520–1521 Revolt of the Comuneros, a popular uprising in the Crown of Castile against the rule of Charles V, Holy Roman Emperor.

== History ==
Ferrand Martínez, Archdeacon of Écija, directed a 13-year anti-Jewish campaign that began in 1378. Martínez used a series of provocative sermons through which he openly condemned the Jews with little to no opposition. He rallied non-Jews against the Jews, creating a constant state of fear through riots. Martínez's efforts led to a series of outbreaks of violence on 4 June 1391, when several synagogues in Seville were burned to the ground and churches were erected in their place. Amidst this outbreak, many Jews fled the country, some converted to Christianity in fear and some were sold to Muslims. Martínez engineered the largest forced mass conversion of Jews in Spain.

Both the church and the crown had not anticipated such a large-scale conversion stemming from Martínez's unplanned antisemitic campaign. The new converts represented a new problem, because although their conversion temporarily resolved the friction between the Christian and Jewish populations, it led to the creation of a new group that was neither completely Catholic nor Jewish, and new tensions resulted.

Conversos, who were now fully privileged citizens, competed in all aspects of the economic sphere. This resulted in a new wave of racial antisemitism that targeted conversos. This antisemitism evolved into small and large riots in Toledo in 1449 that now oppressed not Jews by Christians, but New Christians (conversos) by the Old Christians. The crown established an office of the Inquisition in 1478 and monitored the religious loyalty of newly baptized Christian conversos. Such religious surveillance continued to the descendants of converts. Faced with continued oppression, some Jews and conversos fled Spain to Portugal, but when the Portuguese crown instituted similar anti-Jewish policies, these Jews migrated primarily to the Netherlands. Others created crypto-Jewish communities to ensure the survival of Judaism in the Iberian peninsula, although outwardly practicing Christianity.

In 1485, Pedro de Arbués, an inquisitor in the Kingdom of Aragon, was assassinated while praying in Zaragoza's cathedral. The attack was attributed to a conspiracy involving conversos. Among those implicated were prominent figures, including a grandson of the well-known convert Gerónimo de Santa Fe, who committed suicide in prison. Others, including high-ranking officials and converso elites, were arrested, tortured and executed. Their hands were nailed to the cathedral door before they were beheaded and quartered. Some suspects fled to Navarre and escaped punishment, while others were condemned posthumously. Though contemporary accounts blamed the conversos as a group, records also indicate that “old Christians” were involved, although few faced prosecution.

== Description ==
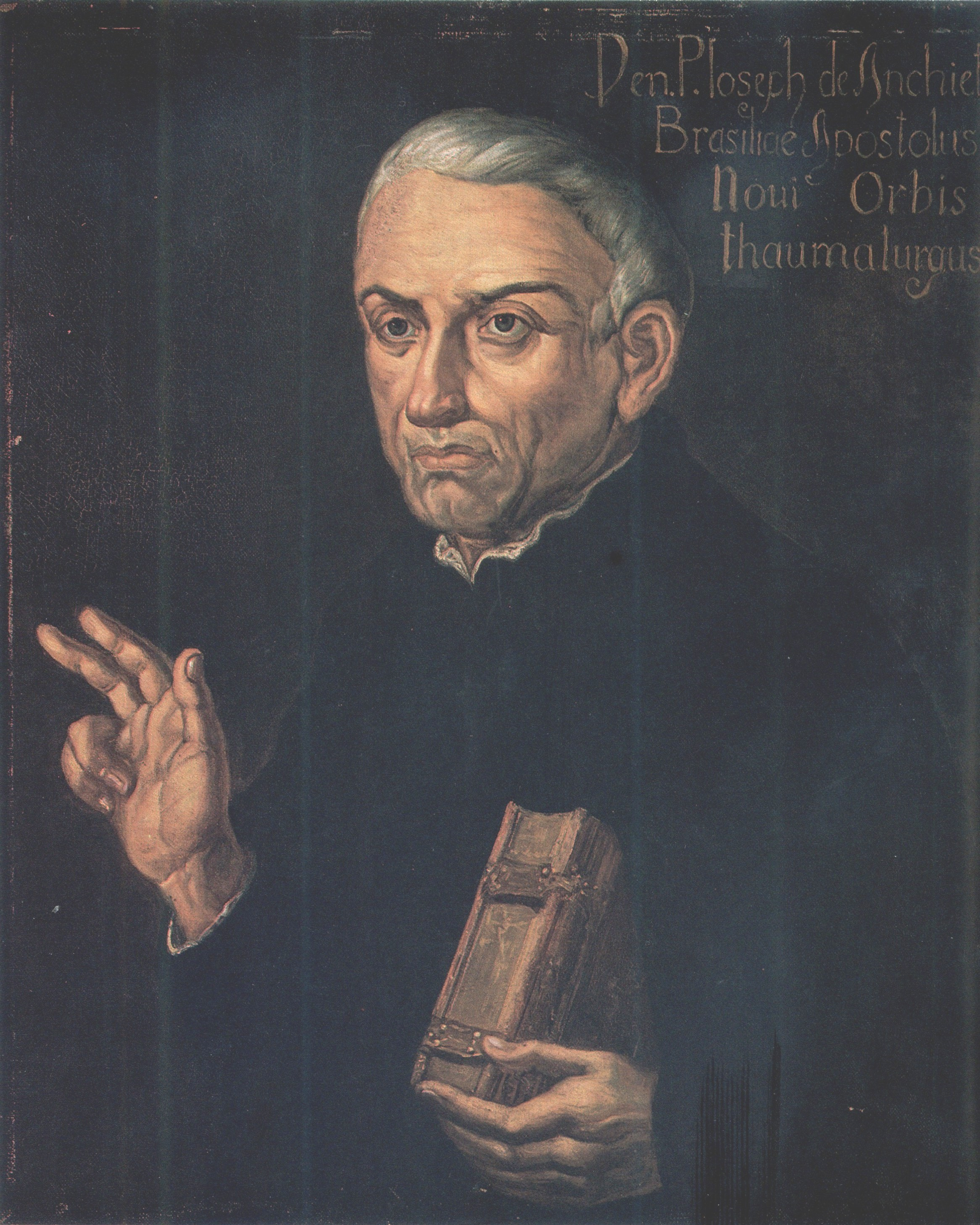
Saint Joseph of Anchieta (1534–1597), Spanish Jesuit missionary to Brazil and one of the founders of São Paulo and Rio de Janeiro. José de Anchieta was a descendant of Jewish converts through the maternal line.

Conversos were subject to suspicion and harassment from their former and new communities alike. Both Christians and Jews called them tornadizos (renegades). James I, Alfonso X and John I passed laws forbidding the use of this epithet. This was part of a larger pattern of royal oversight, as laws were promulgated to protect their property, forbid attempts to convert them back to Judaism or the Muslim faith and regulate their behaviour, preventing cohabitation or even dining with Jews to prevent their return to Judaism.

Conversos did not enjoy legal equality. Alfonso VII prohibited the "recently converted" from holding office in Toledo. Although they had both supporters and bitter opponents in the Christian secular community, they became targets of occasional pogroms during times of social tension (as during an epidemic and after an earthquake).

While those considered to be of pure blood (called limpieza de sangre) with undisputed Christian lineage enjoyed privilege, particularly among the nobility, in a 15th-century defence of conversos, Bishop Lope de Barrientos listed what historian Norman Roth calls "a veritable 'Who's Who' of Spanish nobility" including converso members or those of converso descent. Roth has also written that given the near-universal conversion of Iberian Jews during Visigothic times, "[W]ho among the Christians of Spain could be certain that he is not a descendant of those conversos?"

According to a widely publicised December 2008 study in the American Journal of Human Genetics, genetic DNA tracing has revealed that modern Spaniards and Portuguese have an average admixture of 19.8% of ancestry originating in the Near East (Phoenicians, Carthaginians, Jews and Levantine Arabs) during historic times, compared to 10.6% of North African or Berber admixture. This proportion could be as high as 23% for Latin Americans, according to a study published in Nature Communications. This potentially higher proportion of Jewish ancestry in the Latin American population could stem from increased emigration of conversos to the New World to avoid persecution by the Spanish Inquisition.

== Conversos and the Spanish Golden Age ==
Conversos played a prominent role in shaping Spanish intellectual and literary culture, particularly during the period commonly called the Spanish Golden Age. Their influence began to emerge as early as the 15th century, well before the height of this cultural flourishing. One of the most striking examples of this influence is the authorship of La Celestina, a 1499 book by Fernando de Rojas that is considered the first modern play in any language. Conversos were central contributors not only to poetry and fiction but also to historical chronicles, anti-Jewish polemics, philosophical texts, and other literary forms.

== Religious identity and assimilation ==
According to historian Norman Roth, many conversos possessed only limited knowledge of Jewish religious practice, particularly beyond the most visible customs known even to Old Christians. While some converso polemicists displayed varying degrees of familiarity with Jewish sources, converso poets generally lacked such religious knowledge. Claims that Hebrew or Talmudic influences shaped converso literature, such as in the works of Juan de Mena or Juan Álvarez Gato, have been dismissed by scholars such as Roth as speculative and unsupported.

Some prominent converso figures exhibited notable ignorance regarding Jewish heritage. Pedro de la Caballería, for instance, mistakenly called Maimonides "Moses the Egyptian," assuming that Maimonides had lived in Egypt rather than in Spain. He also misattributed advice to the Catholic Monarchs to Vicente Ferrer, who had died decades earlier. Even those conversos with formal Jewish education, such as Pablo de Santa María, ultimately rejected Jewish sources in favor of Christian interpretations, sometimes based on misreadings. In his writings, de Santa María presented biblical narratives through a Christian lens, depicting the serpent as Lucifer and Eve as the corruptor of Adam, despite lacking textual basis in the Hebrew bible.

In Burgos, conversos were generally regarded as devout Christians, especially those from the influential Santa María family, whose example was considered representative across Spain. Allegations of religious insincerity, known as "infamy," existed in cities such as Calahorra, Osma and Salamanca, although more serious criminal accusations were recorded in Toledo and Seville. Some conversos are known to have supported religious and charitable foundations, forming or joining confraternities (cofradías) such as Santa María la Blanca in Toledo, established in 1478. Founding members of this cofradía included physicians, merchants, craftsmen and officials, many of whom were conversos. In 1488, another group of Toledo conversos founded a chapel in the monastery of San Agustín.

Some conversos retained messianic expectations traditionally associated with Judaism. In the 15th century, chronicler Alonso de Palencia reported that many conversos in Andalusia continued to believe in the coming of the messiah, interpreting unusual natural events (such as the sighting of a whale off the coast near Setúbal, which they identified with the biblical sea monster Leviathan) as signs of its imminent arrival. However, it is unclear whether such beliefs referred to the Jewish messiah or to Christ's second coming.

== Perpetuation of Jewish heritage ==
Conversas played a pivotal role in keeping Jewish traditions alive by observing many Jewish holidays such as Shabbat. They prepared traditional Jewish dishes in honor of the Sabbath (starting on Friday at sundown), Yom Kippur and other religious holidays. During festivals such as Sukkot and Passover, conversas participated by giving clothing articles and ornaments to Jewish women, attending a seder or obtaining a baking matzah. Conversas ensured that their households maintained similar dietary regulations as their Jewish counterparts by consuming only kosher flesh. These women also financially contributed to the growth of the combined Jewish/converso community and the synagogues.

The Jewish community and conversos exchanged books and knowledge. Jews taught conversos how to read to ensure constant growth of their Jewish heritage. To take a stance against the church and its principles, some conversos worked on Sundays in violation of church policy.

The traditional Jewish Purim was preserved by conversos still adhering to Jewish observances under the guise of a Christian holiday that they named the Festival of Santa Esterica.

== Spanish Inquisition discipline ==
The Spanish Inquisition operated in close collaboration with secular authorities to impose a range of penalties on those accused of heresy. Canon law prohibited the church from directly executing individuals; instead, those convicted were "relaxed to the secular arm," a euphemism for the transfer of alleged heretics to state authorities for administration of capital punishment. One of the most infamous methods of execution was death by immolation, a practice not found in traditional secular law but devised within ecclesiastical circles. It was justified theologically as a way to save the heretic's soul from eternal damnation through worldly suffering. If the condemned repented just before execution, he would be allowed to be killed by garrote, a method that was believed to spare the soul.

Public executions, known as autos-da-fé ("acts of faith"), were grand, theatrical events involving processions through city streets, public readings of sentences and long sermons. These spectacles attracted large crowds and, by the 16th century, even royal attendance. In Madrid, for example, the monarchs observed such a ceremony from a balcony overlooking the Plaza Mayor, reportedly enjoying refreshments during the spectacle.

Those who confessed under torture or pressure were labeled reconciliados (reconciled to the church) and subjected to public humiliation. They were paraded in distinctive garments called sambenitos, often with red crosses, and forced to endure public readings of their offenses. Their sambenitos, bearing their names, were hung permanently in churches as a warning to others and a lasting mark of shame on their descendants. Some people who had died or fled were condemned in absentia and burned in effigy, a practice known as sentencing in statue or in statute. The bones of deceased heretics could be exhumed and burned publicly to enforce posthumous condemnation.

== By country ==
=== In Spain ===
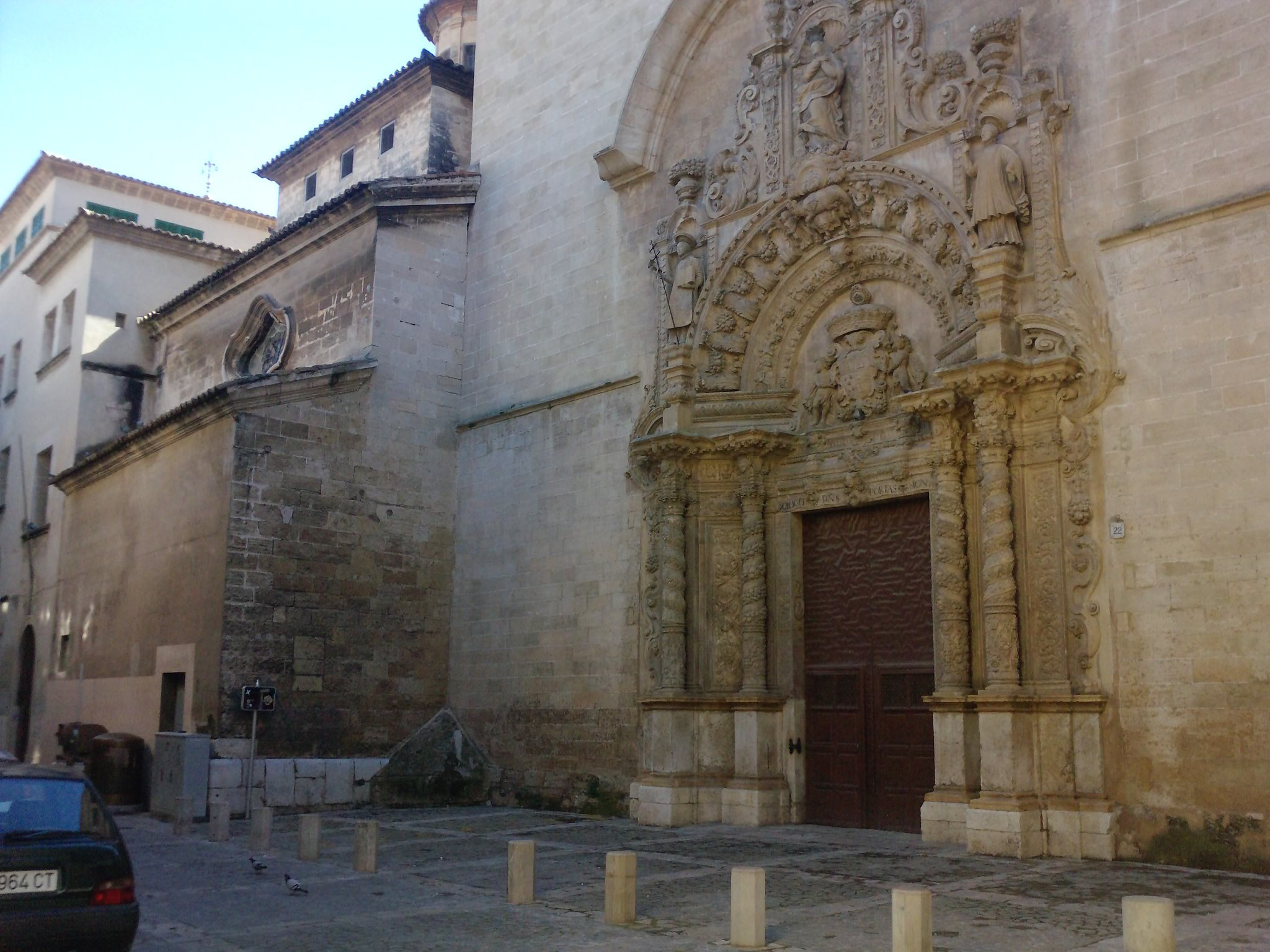
Church of Montesión (Mount Zion) in Palma de Mallorca, the main church of Xuetas of Mallorca.

The Chuetas are a current social group on the Spanish island of Mallorca, in the Mediterranean Sea, who are descendants of Mallorcan Jews that either were conversos or were crypto-Jews, forced to keep their religion hidden. They practiced strict endogamy by marrying only within their own group.

The Chuetas have been stigmatized in the Balearic Islands. In the latter part of the 20th century, the spread of freedom of religion as well as secularism reduced both the social pressure and community ties. An estimated 18,000 people in the island carry Chueta surnames in the 21st century. Traditionally, the church of Saint Eulalia and the church of Montesión (Mount Zion) in Palma de Mallorca have been used by the families of Jewish converts (Xuetas).

According to a survey conducted by the University of the Balearic Islands in 2001, 30% of Mallorcans stated that they would never marry a Chueta and 5% declared that they do not wish to have Chueta friends.

=== In Italy ===
Specific groups of conversos left Spain and Portugal after the Spanish Inquisition in 1492 for other parts of Europe, especially Italy, where they were often regarded with suspicion and harassment in both their former and new communities. Many conversos who arrived in Italian cities did not openly embrace their Judaism, tempted by the advantages offered in the Christian world.

The first three cities to accept conversos who openly converted back to Judaism were Florence, Ferrara and Ancona. Most of these conversos appeared after 1536 from Portugal, and most lived in Florence. In 1549, Duke Cosimo I de' Medici allowed the Portuguese conversos to trade and reside within Florence. Most of the conversos who reverted to Judaism lived in the ghetto of Florence, and by 1705 there were 453 Jews in the city.

Conversos arrived in Ferrara in 1535 and were able to assimilate with their neighbours, perform circumcisions and openly return to Judaism pursuant to a declaration issued by Duke Ercole I d'Este. After an occurrence of plague in 1505 and the fall of Ferrara in 1551, many of these Jews relocated north toward the economically stable ports of Venice. The city slowly became a center for conversos who either stopped temporarily on their way to Turkey or stayed permanently as residents in the ghetto. Fearful of losing the conversos' trade to Turkey, Venetian leaders permitted them to openly practice Judaism. Many of the conversos during this period struggled with their Christian and Jewish identities.

Many conversos in the city of Ancona faced difficult lives and fled to Ferrara in 1555. Portuguese conversos in Ancona were misled that they were welcome there and that they could openly revert to Judaism. Pope Paul IV imprisoned 102 conversos who refused to reside in the Anconitan ghetto or to wear identification badges. In 1588, when the duke granted a charter of residence in return for the embittered conversos' contributions to the city's economy, they refused.

== Notable conversos and their descendants ==
=== First-generation conversos ===
- Abraham Senior – Crown rabbi of Castille, late-life convert to Christianity (1412–1493)
- Alfonso de Cartagena – Bishop, diplomat, historian and writer (1384–1456)
- Paul of Burgos – Rabbi and later archbishop (c.1351–1435)
- Petrus Alphonsi – Physician and writer (d. after 1116)

=== Later generations ===
- António José da Silva – Dramatist (1705–1739)
- Fernando de Rojas – Dramatist (c.1465/73–1541)
- Hernán Pérez de Quesada – Conquistador (c. 1515–1544)
- Isaac Orobio de Castro – Philosopher and physician, returnee to Judaism (c.1617–1687)
- Luis de León – Poet, friar and scholar (1527–1591)
- Luis de Santángel – Finance minister of the Catholic Monarchs (c. 1435–1498)
- Tomás Luis de Victoria - Composer, priest, chaplain to dowager Empress Maria of Austria (1548-1611)
- Teresa of Ávila – Catholic saint (1515–1582)
- Uriel da Costa – Philosopher, returnee to Judaism (1585–1640)

==== Possible/debated ====
- Christopher Colombus – Navigator and explorer (1451–1506)
- Joan Miró – Painter (1893–1983)
- Miguel de Cervantes – Writer (1547–1616)

== See also ==
- Marrano
- Chuetas
- Dönmeh
- Allahdad
- Banu Israil
- Falash Mura
- Chala
- Neofiti
- Anusim
- Crypto-Judaism
- Judaism in Mexico
