= Hasan Tahsin =

Turkish-Jewish war hero

- Osman Nevres
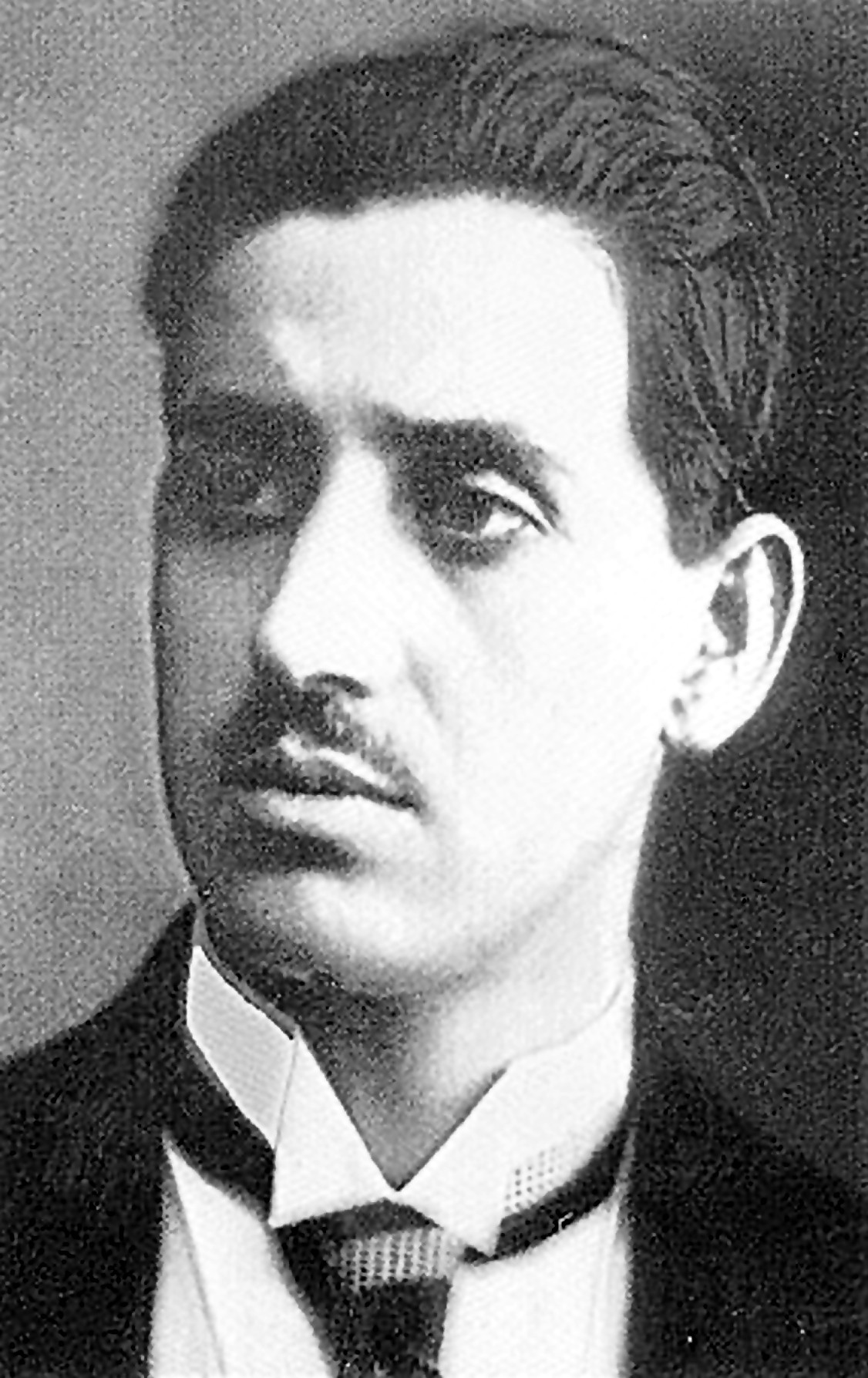
- Born: Osman Nevres; 1888; Salonica, Ottoman Empire
- Died: 15 May 1919 (aged 30–31); İzmir, Ottoman Empire
- Occupations: Journalist, member of the Ottoman Special Organization
- Organization: Special Organization
- Known for: Opening of fire on the Greek soldiers that landed at Smyrna
- Political party: Union and Progress Party

Hasan Tahsin was the code name of Osman Nevres (1888 – 15 May 1919), a Turkish nationalist and journalist of Dönmeh descent.

Hailed as a Turkish war hero, his name has been given by the Turkish Armed Forces to the Information Center of the Turkish General Staff (Genelkurmay İletişim Başkanlığı'nın Hasan Tahsin Bilgi Merkezi). A member of the Ottoman Special Organization, he unsuccessfully tried to assassinate Noel and Charles Roden Buxton in Romania during World War I. He was sentenced to five years imprisonment for the attempt but released when German forces overran Romania.

He opened fire on the Greek soldiers who landed at Smyrna (present day İzmir) on 15 May 1919 in the opening act of the Greek occupation of more than three years that extended over a large part of western Anatolia, as well as of the Greco-Turkish War. He was killed on the spot on 15 May 1919 after killing the Greek standard-bearer. At the time of his death he had been publishing and writing for the newspaper Hukuk-u Beşer (Ottoman Turkish for Human Rights).

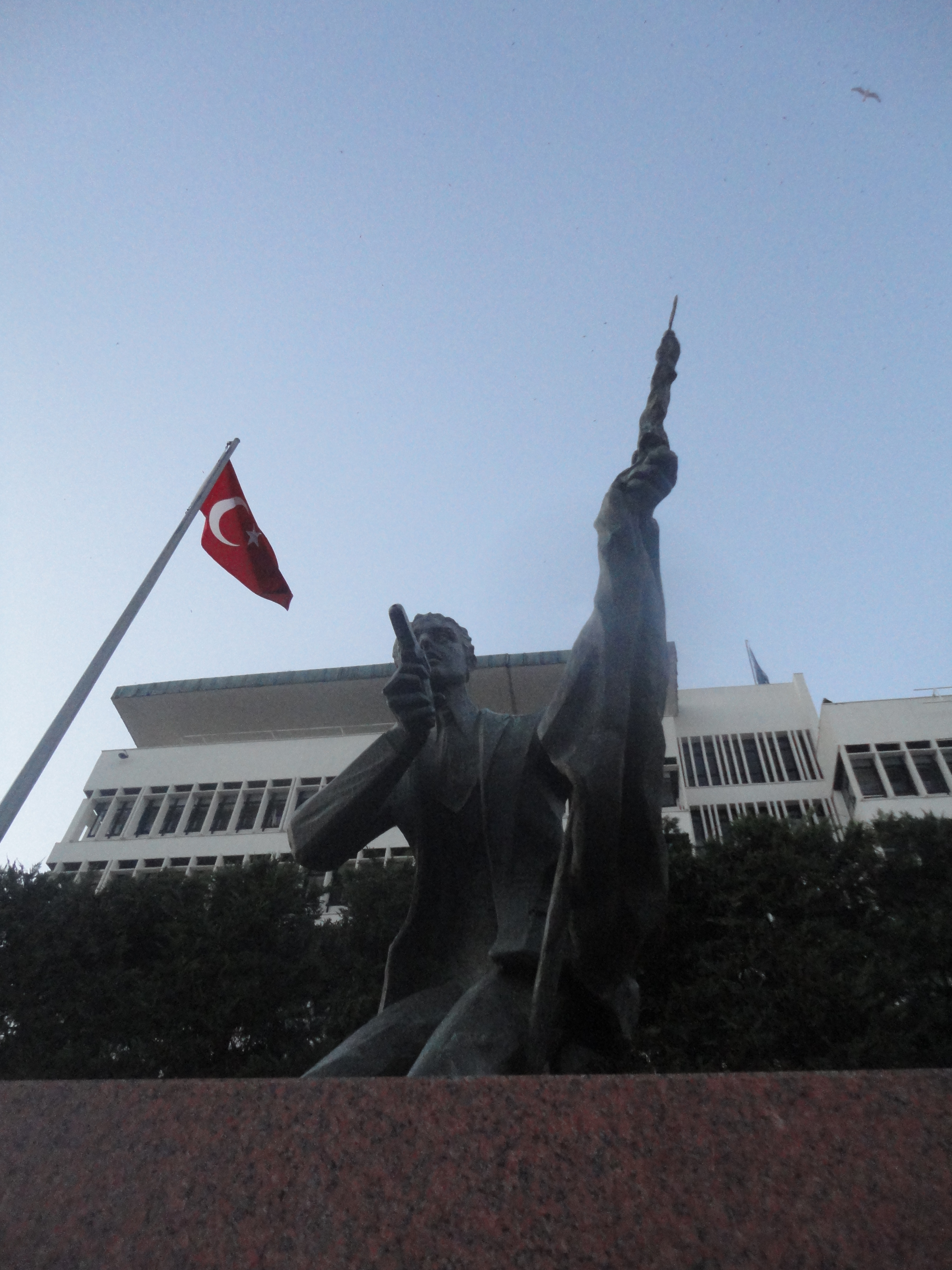
The first bullet statue of Hasan Tahsin, İzmir, Turkey
