= Neofiti =

Total population
- unknown

Regions with significant populations
- Southern Italy

Languages
- Unknown, probably Sicilian, other Italian dialects, and/or Italkian

Religion
- Catholicism and Crypto-Judaism until the 16th century

Related ethnic groups
- Italians; Jews

The neofiti (English: Neophytes) were a group of Italian anusim, also known as crypto-Jews, living in Southern Italy.

== History ==
The Kingdom of Sicily.

The neofiti were descendants of Jews who were forced to convert to Roman Catholicism in 1493. They continued to secretly practice certain elements of Judaism, as did many of their descendants.

In the 1490s, the Spanish Inquisition ruthlessly hunted the neofiti and many were tortured and executed, especially in Sicily.

Today, some descendants of neofiti in Calabria and Apulia have converted back to Judaism and revived their former Jewish congregations.

== See also ==
- Dönmeh
- Allahdad
- Banu Israil
- Chala
- Converso
- Marrano
- Targum Neofiti
- Jews of San Nicandro
- History of the Jews in Apulia
- History of the Jews in Calabria
- History of the Jews in Sicily
