= Chala (Jews) =

Bukharan crypto-Jews

See disambiguation page Challa for more meanings of the word.

Chala (Uzbek: чала [tʃala]) is a Tajik term meaning "neither this nor that," referring to Bukharan Jews who were coerced into converting to Islam from the late 18th century onwards. In response, these Chala Jews outwardly practiced Islam, but secretly retained their Jewish traditions. These crypto-Jews married among themselves and lived in their own separate neighborhoods that bordered on existing Jewish neighborhoods. The Chala Jews carry a very similar story to the Dönmeh and to the Marranos of Spain.

Chala Jews were unable to return to their true Jewish faith due to the fatal consequences associated with leaving the Islamic faith. The Islamic rulership during this period imposed a death penalty against those renouncing their Islamic faith. Therefore, it was not until the emergence of Imperial Russia, and Soviet rule that some Chala Jews were able to revert to their original faith.

The return of the Chala to Judaism began with the Russian conquest of Central Asia in 1867. While the Khiva and Kokand khanates were incorporated into the Turkestan governorate, the Bukhara Khanate remained autonomous and continued to enforce the death penalty against those who abandoned Islam. As a result, many Chala Jews illegally immigrated into Russian-controlled areas, to escape the certain threat of death. Although Russian law required that these newcomers be deported back to Bukhara and face an imminent death, the deportation orders were continuously delayed, and thus many had remained as permanent non-citizens of the Russian Turkestan region. Some Chala Jews also joined merchant guilds in order to prove their economic use to the empire. Because Muslim law was retained in Bukhara for a longer period than in surrounding cities, by the time communist Soviet rule arrived in Bukhara, many members of the local Chala no longer self-identified as Jewish, having by then become fully assimilated into the Muslim population.

By the 19th century, Chala Jews predominantly lived in Bukhara, with a few in Samarkand, Khiva, Kokand, Margilan, and Shahrisabz. Often, it was not until two to three generations that Chala Jews would begin to intermarry with the local Muslim population and shed any remaining Jewish traditions. Following the installation of Soviet rule in 1920, the religious distinction among the population was no longer officially recognized. Ethnic distinctions on passports enabled Chala Jews to continue being counted as ethnic Uzbeks and Tajiks, rather than Jews.

In 2000, author Mansur Surosh published a novel Chala ("The Outcasts"), which describes the experiences of the Chala.

== See also ==
- Apostasy in Judaism
- Dönmeh
- Allahdad
- Banu Israil
- Converso
- Marrano
- Neofiti
- Emirate of Bukhara
- Judaism and Islam
- Challa (disambiguation page)
