= Ferrand Martínez =

Antisemitic Spanish cleric (14th century)

Ferrand (or Ferrán) Martinez (fl. 14th century) was an elite Spanish cleric at the Cathedral of Seville and archdeacon of Écija most noted for being an antisemitic agitator whom historians cite as the prime mover behind the series of massacres of the Spanish Jews in 1391, beginning in the city of Seville.

== Early life ==
Little is known of Martínez's early life. Before taking up the position at Écija, he was the confessor of the queen mother of Aragón.

== Role in the struggle for power ==
Martínez was made an alcalde (royal judge) in 1376.

In 1378 he began preaching sermons against the Jews. Although Enriques II's heir Juan I commanded him to cease his rabble-rousing, he ignored the royal order, as well as commands from the primate of Spain, Archbishop Barroso of Toledo. For more than a decade Martínez continued his verbal assaults, telling Catholics to "expel the Jews...and to demolish their synagogues."

== The aljama's 1388 lawsuit against the archdeacon ==
His preaching on February 19, 1388, alarmed Seville’s Jewish community, known as the aljama.

== The Massacre of 1391 ==
A tipping point occurred when both Juan I and Barroso died in 1390, leaving his 11-year-old son Henry III to rule under the regency of his mother. Martínez continued his campaign against the Jews of Seville, calling on clergy and people to destroy synagogues and seize Jewish holy books and other items. These events led to a further royal order deposing Martínez from his office and ordering damaged synagogues be repaired at Church expense. Declaring that neither the state nor the local church authorities had power over him, he ignored the commands.

== Imprisonment and death ==
Martínez was imprisoned again by royal order in 1395, and although he was quickly released, he died soon after, leaving his fortune to a hospital he had founded at San María, Seville.
