= Dönmeh =

Group of Sabbatean crypto-Jews in the Ottoman Empire

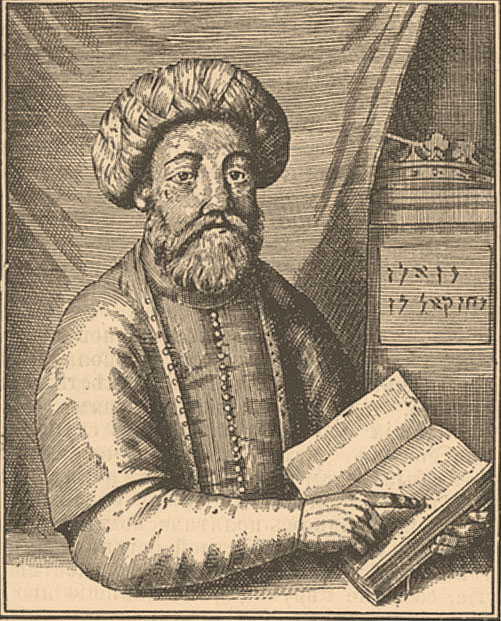
Illustration of Shabbetai Tzevi from the Jewish Encyclopedia (1906), Joods Historisch Museum, Amsterdam

The Dönmeh (Hebrew: דוֹנְמֶה, romanized: Dōnme, Ottoman Turkish: دونمه, Turkish: Dönme) are a group of Sabbatean crypto-Jews in the Ottoman Empire who embraced Islam, but retained their Jewish faith and Kabbalistic beliefs in secret.

The Sabbatean movement was centered mainly in Thessalonika. It originated during and soon after the era of Shabbetai Tzevi, a 17th-century Romaniote Jewish rabbi and Kabbalist who claimed to be the Jewish Messiah and eventually feigned conversion to Islam under threat of capital punishment from the Ottoman sultan Mehmed IV in 1666. After Zevi's conversion to Islam, a number of Sabbatean Jews purportedly converted to Islam while remaining secretly faithful to Judaism after their leader, and became known as the "Dönmeh".

In the 20th century, the Dönmeh were strongly involved in the Kemalist movement, the creation of the Turkish nation-state and the political system of the Turkish Republic. Many Dönmeh or other Jewish individuals, such as Hasan Tahsin, Haim Nahum Effendi, Haim Bejarano, Munis Cohen Tekinalp and Avram Galanti Bodrumlu were prominent Turkish nationalists, Kemalists or fighters in the Turkish War of Independence. Indeed, most Dönmeh and most Jews in Turkey supported the Ankara government and fought against Greece in the Greco-Turkish War, being later cited as a loyal model minority by Turkish leaders.

Some live on into 21st-century Turkey. As of 2016, there were an estimated 2,000 non-assimilated Dönmeh in Turkey.

== Etymology ==
The Turkish word dönmeh ("apostates") derives from the verbal root dön- (Ottoman Turkish: دون) that means "to turn", i.e., "to convert", but in the pejorative sense of "turncoat".

The independent scholar Rıfat Bali defines the term dönmeh as follows:

The term Donme is a Turkish gerund meaning 'to turn, revolve or return' and, by extension, "to betray" (i.e., 'go back on') and 'to convert' to another religion. It has come in popular parlance to refer to religious converts in general, and, more specifically, to the seventeenth century followers of the Jewish false messiah Sabbatai Sevi and their descendants, who outwardly converted to Islam but retained their secretive religious practices over the next several centuries, maintaining close communal and blood ties and practicing strict endogamy. While the great majority of the community's members abandoned their practices during the first quarter century, their past identity has continued to haunt them within Turkish society, and the term Dönme itself remains one of opprobrium.

The Dönmeh were sometimes called Selânikli ("person from Thessalonika") or avdetî (Ottoman Turkish: عودتی, "religious convert"). Members of the group referred to themselves as "the Believers" (Hebrew: המאמינים, romanized: ha-Maʾminim), Ḥaberim "Associates", or Baʿlē Milḥāmā "Warriors", while in the town of Adrianople (now Edirne) they were known as sazanikos, Judaeo-Spanish for "little carps", perhaps about the changing outward nature of the fish or because of the prophecy that Sabbatai Zevi would deliver the Jews under the zodiacal sign of the fish.

== History ==
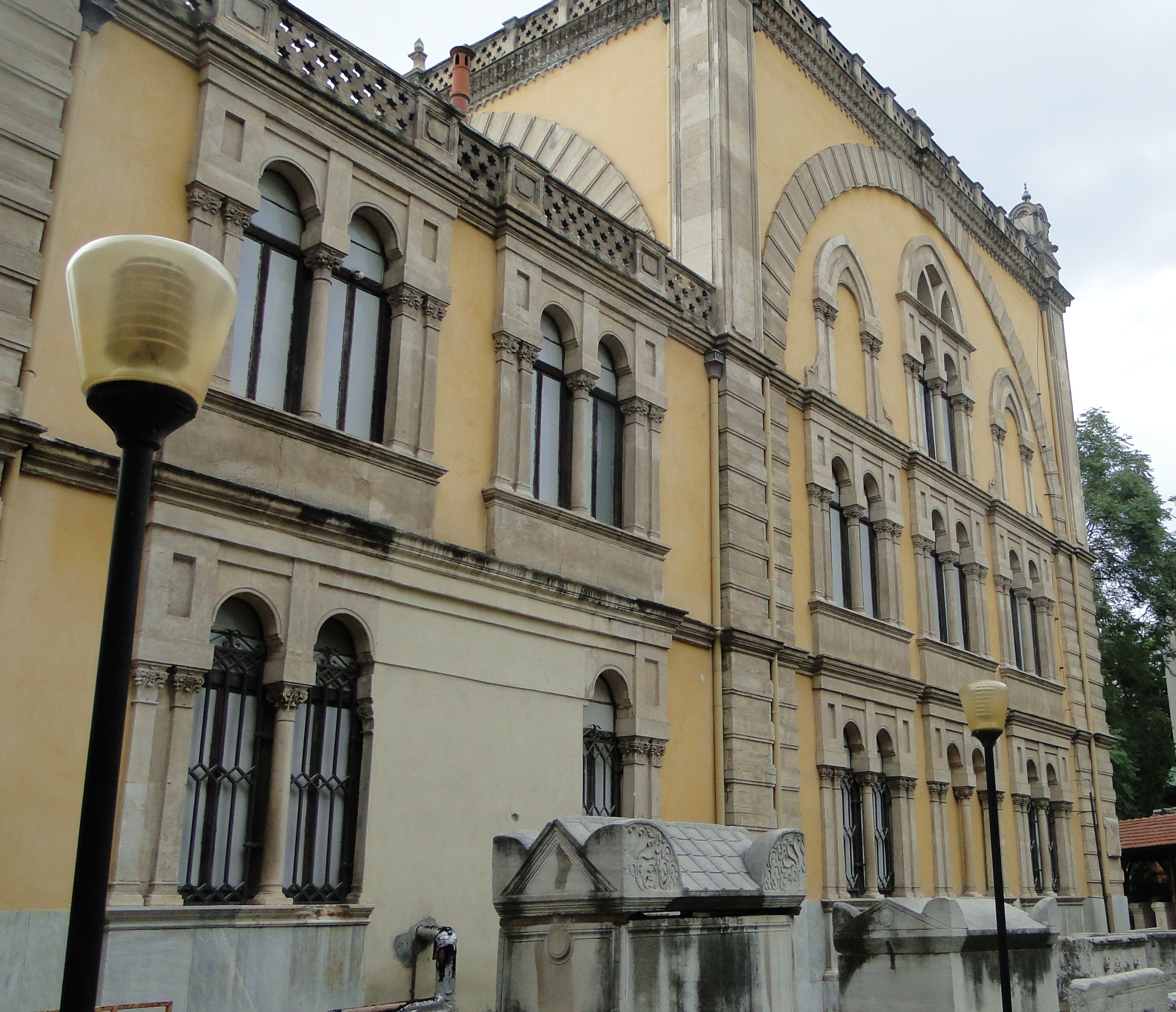
The Yeni Mosque in Thessalonika, built by the Dönmeh community towards the end of the Ottoman Empire.

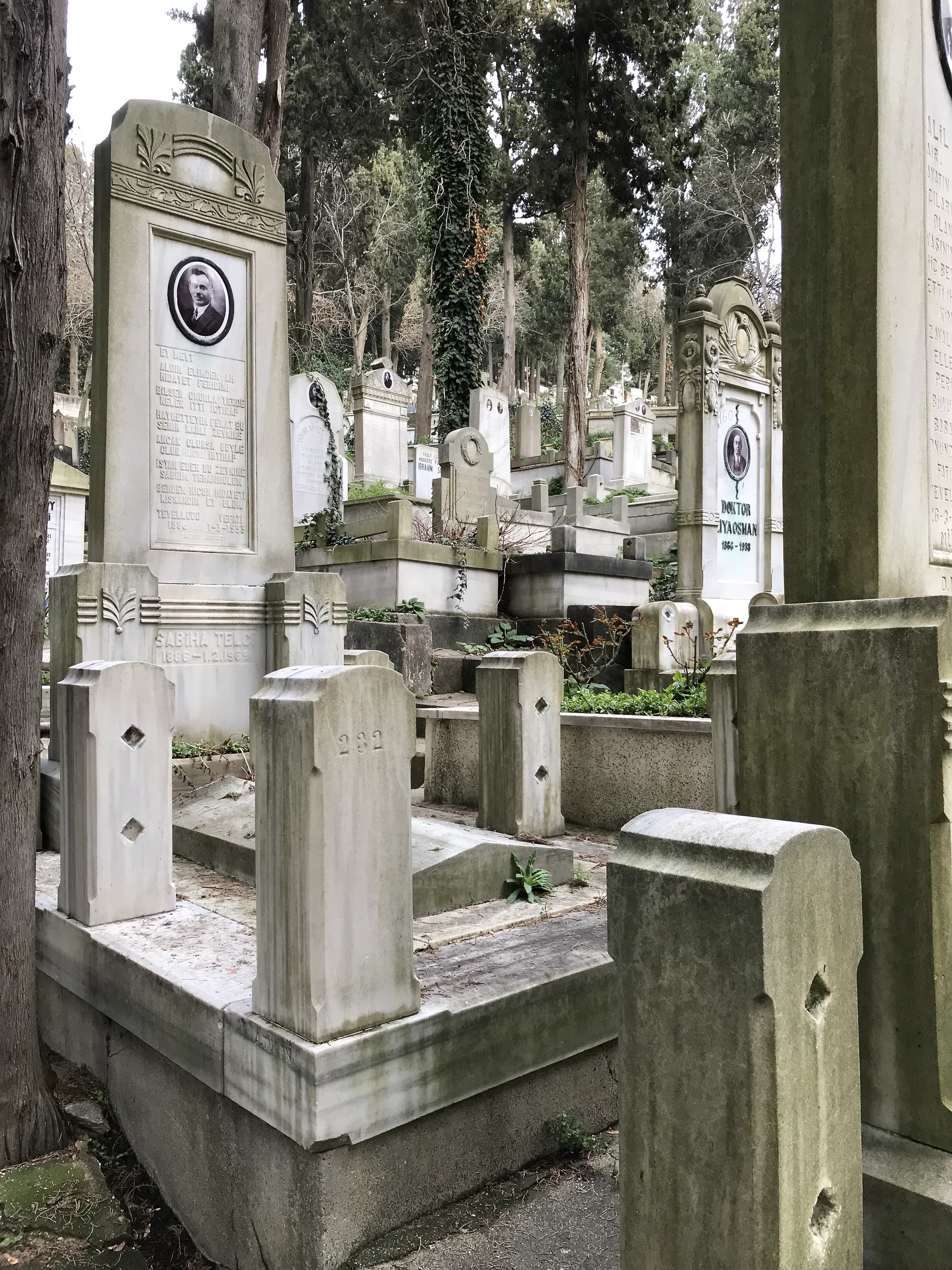
Dönme gravestones in the Bülbüldere Cemetery in Üsküdar, Istanbul

When Sabbatai Zevi (1626–1676) converted to Islam in Ottoman Court possibly in exchange for amnesty in 1666, some of his followers followed him into Islam whiles others gave esoteric explanations and dismissals of his conversion. Zevi’s final wife, Ayse, and her father, the esteemed rabbi Joseph Filosof, were originally from Salonica. After Zevi’s death, they returned to the city and played a key role in founding the new religious sect he had initiated. By 1900, Thessaloniki was home to a community of around 10,000 Judeo-Spanish-speaking Muslims. This group was followed by about 3,000 other Sabbateans in 1683, shortly after the death of Nathan of Gaza, which occurred in 1680. Despite their outward conversion to Islam, the Sabbateans secretly remained faithful to Judaism and continued to hold their Kabbalistic theology, along with Jewish beliefs and rituals. These included: recognizing Sabbatai Zevi as the Jewish Messiah, observing certain Jewish commandments with similarities to those in Rabbinic Judaism, and Jewish prayers in Hebrew and Ladino. They also observed rituals celebrating important events in Tzevi's life and interpreted his conversion in accordance with their own interpretation of Lurianic Kabbalah.

The Dönmeh divided into several branches. The first, the İzmirli, was formed in İzmir (Smyrna) and was the original sect, from which two others eventually split. The first schism created the Jacobite (Turkish: Yakubi) sect, founded by Jacob Querido (c. 1650–1690), the brother of Tzevi's last wife. Querido claimed to be Tzevi's reincarnation and proclaimed himself as a Messiah in his own right. The second split from the İzmirli was the result of Baruchiah Russo (1677–1720), which claimed to be Tzevi's successor. These allegations gained attention and gave rise to the Karakashi (Turkish: Karakaşi; Ladino: Konioso), branch, the most numerous and strictest branch of the Dönmeh.

Despite lingering suspicions throughout the 19th century that the Thessaloniki's Dönmeh were secretly Jewish, the group gradually evolved into a distinct heterodox Muslim sect, shaped in part by Sufi influences as their connection to Judaism faded. Wealthier Dönmeh families increasingly intermarried with mainstream Muslims and became integrated into Ottoman urban society. By the late 19th century, the Dönmeh were active in expanding Muslim education in Thessaloniki and played a significant role in the city's commercial, administrative, and intellectual life. Some became prosperous merchants, building European-style villas along the seafront and entering municipal governance, while others worked in skilled trades such as barbering, coppersmithing, and butchery. Their embrace of European education and reformist ideas helped turn Thessaloniki into one of the most progressive and politically dynamic cities in the Ottoman Empire.

=== Rise of the Young Turks, the Committee for Union and Progress and Turkish War of Independence ===
Late Ottoman Dönmeh and other Jewish writers explicitly articulated an alliance between Jews and Muslims against common Christian enemies, including Armenians and Greeks. As such, several leading members of the Young Turks were Dönmeh. In the period preceding and succeeding World War I and in the Turkish War of Independence, Dönmeh and other Turkish Jews heavily supported the Committee for Union and Progress (CUP) and the Turkish National Movement. They were the only non-Turkish minority in the 1912 elections which, in its majority, supported the CUP and opposed the Freedom and Accord Party.

During World War I and the Armenian Genocide, Dönmeh and other Jews remained muted, and self-interested. However, the Jewish underground group "Nili" was a unique exception, in that it sympathized with the Armenians. Some Dönmeh and other Jewish individuals helped rescue Armenians and donated to their relief aid, but others, affiliated with Turkish nationalists, helped the perpetrators find Armenian victims and also participated in the pillaging of Armenian homes, alongside Turks.

Immediately after World War I and the Allied victory, in November 1918, the Jewish Turkish nationalist Nesim Navaro tore down the Greek flag in Smyrna. Another Jewish Turkish nationalist tore down the Greek flag in Kadifekale. After the Greek landing at Smyrna in 1919, the Dönmeh Hasan Tahsin opened fire on Greek soldiers, killing a Greek standard-bearer, for which he was killed on the spot. He is commemorated as a war hero in Turkey. In Maşatlık, the Jewish cemetery became a protest center against the Occupation of Smyrna. Boaz Menaşe, when asked if Turkish Jews wanted the city to become Greek or remain Turkish, he answered that Turkish Jews want it to remain Turkish. In Bursa, the Jewish community refused to hoist Greek flags and skipped pro-Greek meetings. Meanwhile, many Jews hid Turkish nationalist soldiers in their houses and passed on key information to them. In addition, Benjamen Katan tried to block a Greek-sponsored autonomy petition in Bergama, alongside other Jews and Turks. After the end of the war, Mustafa Kemal Pasha thanked many rabbis and Jews for their assistance.

=== Early years of the Turkish Republic (1923–1945) ===
In 1923, during the compulsory population exchange between Greece and Turkey, the Dönme of Thessaloniki were classified as Muslims and relocated to Istanbul. There, a smaller but influential community emerged, including businessmen, newspaper publishers, industrialists, and diplomats, many of whom continued to thrive in Turkish society. In 1932, the Jewish Telegraphic Agency reported 15,000 Dönme in Istanbul.

One of the leaders of the supposed İzmir plot to assassinate President Mustafa Kemal Pasha (Atatürk since 1934) in İzmir after the establishment of the Turkish Republic was a Dönme named Mehmed Cavid Bey, a founding member of the Committee of Union and Progress (CUP) and the former Minister of Finance of the Ottoman Empire. Convicted after a government investigation, Cavid Bey was hanged on 26 August 1926 in Ankara. After the foundation of the Turkish Republic in 1923, Atatürk's Turkish nationalist policies, which had left ethnic and religious minorities in the lurch, were accompanied by antisemitic propaganda by nationalist publishers in the 1930s and 1940s.

== Religious beliefs and practices ==
As far as ritual was concerned, the Dönmeh followed both Jewish and Muslim traditions, shifting between them as necessary for integration into Ottoman society. Outwardly Muslims and secretly Sabbatean Jews, the Dönme observed Muslim holidays like Ramadan but also kept Shabbat, practiced brit milah, and celebrated Jewish holidays. Much of Dönme ritual was a combination of various elements of Kabbalah, Sabbateanism, Jewish traditional law and Sufism. The most basic of these rules of interaction was to prefer relations within the sect rather than with those outside of it, and to avoid marriage with either Jews or Muslims. In spite of this, they maintained ties with rabbinic Jews who were secretly Sabbateans and had not formally converted to Islam, and even with Jewish rabbis, who secretly settled disputes concerning Jewish law.

The most controversial of the Donmeh rituals was the "festival of the lamb" (Hag ha-Keves) performed on the night of 22 Adar. This coincided with the beginning of the spring and the traditional Nevruz (Persian:Nowruz) festival common in the areas of greater Iran. Accounts describe a night of communal meal including lamb, singing, praying and drinking. The most controversial part was called the "extinguishing the flame". According to Gershom Scholem, the lights were turned off and married couples exchanged sexual partners. Scholem describes this act as ritualistic, rather than pleasure based. This practice only involved married couples and singles were barred from this festival. Scholem argues the origin of the festival is probably pagan and related to the "great mother" tradition common in Anatolia. According to some authors such as Cengiz Sisman, the babies conceived during this festival were perceived to be holy and "would-be-messiahs". Some authors such as Ohad Pele, claim that the sabbatean leader, Baruchiah Russo was conceived during this ritual.

Dönme liturgy evolved as the sect grew and spread. At first, much of their literature was written in Hebrew but, as the group developed, Ladino replaced Hebrew and became not only the vernacular but also the liturgical language. Although the Dönmeh had divided into several sects, all of them believed that Shabbetai Tzevi was the Jewish Messiah and that he had revealed the true "spiritual Torah" (Torah de-atzilut),which was superior to the practical, earthly Torah (Torah de-Beriah). The Dönmeh celebrated holidays associated with various points in Tzevi's life and their history of conversion. Based at least partially on the Kabbalistic understanding of divinity, the Dönmeh believed that there was a three-way connection between the emanations of the Divine, which engendered many conflicts with Muslim and Jewish communities alike. The most notable source of opposition from other contemporary religions was the common practice of exchanging wives between members of the Dönmeh.

Dönme hierarchy was based on the branch divisions. The İzmirli, made up of the merchant classes and the intelligentsia, topped the hierarchy. Artisans tended to be mostly Karakashi while the lower classes were mostly Yakubi. Each branch had its prayer community, organised into a kahal or congregation. An extensive internal economic network provided support for lower-class Dönmeh, despite ideological differences between the different branches.

After the establishment of the State of Israel in 1948, only a few Dönme families migrated from Muslim-majority countries to Israel. In 1994, Ilgaz Zorlu, an accountant who claimed to be of Dönme origin on his mother's side, started publishing articles in history journals in which he revealed his self-proclaimed Dönme identity and presented the Dönmeh and their religious beliefs. As the Hakham Bashi of Turkey and the Chief Rabbinate of Israel did not accept the Dönmeh as Jews without a lengthy conversion to Judaism, Zorlu applied to the Istanbul 9th Court of First Instance in July 2000. He requested that his religious affiliation in his Turkish identity card to be changed from "Islam" to "Jew" and won his case. Soon after, the Turkish Beth Din accepted him as a Jew.

However, Dönmeh are not recognized as Jews by the Israeli nationality law and are not eligible for the Law of Return. For the Portuguese law of return, the decision to recognize dönme as Jews or not is outsourced to local Jewish communities. The Dönme's situation is similar to that of the Falash Mura.

== Antisemitism and alleged political entanglements ==
Turkish antisemitism and the canards upon which it relies are centred on the Dönmeh. According to historian Marc David Baer, the phenomenon has deep roots in late-Ottoman history, and its legacy of conspiratorial accusations persisted throughout the history of the Turkish Republic and is kept alive there today. Modern antisemitism tends to present Jews as a ubiquitous, homogenous unit acting undercover via diverse global groups in pursuit of global political and economic control via secretive channels. As a crypto-Sabbatean sect, the Dönme always made an easy target for claims about secret, crypto-Jewish political control and social influence, whether charged with setting in motion political upheaval against the status quo, or accused of shaping an oppressive regime's grip on the status quo. The Dönme are often allegedly associated by conspiracy theorists with domestic agents working with foreign powers trying to contain Turkey's rise within the political narratives of the Sèvres Syndrome and Lausanne Syndrome.

The Dönme history of Sabbatean theological and ritual secrecy grounded in Jewish tradition, coupled with public observance of Islam, make accusations of secret Jewish control convenient, according to Baer. "Secret Jew", then, takes on a double meaning of being both secretly Jewish and Jews who act secretively to exert control; their secret religious identity in the first place is compatible, for conspiracy theorists, with their secretive influence, especially when they cannot be distinguished from ordinary Turkish Muslims who reside everywhere, and, as Baer argues, when the modern antisemite sees the Jew as necessarily "everywhere". The Dönme's manoeuverings were said to have lain at the heart of the Young Turk Revolution and its overthrow of Sultan Abdul Hamid II, the dissolution of the Ottoman religious establishment, and the founding of a secular republic. Pro-sultan, religious Muslim political opponents painted these events as a global Jewish and Freemasonic plot carried out by Turkey's Dönme.

Islamists put forward a conspiracy theory claiming Atatürk was a Dönme in order to defame him as they have been opposed his reforms, and they created many other conspiracy theories about him. There is one instance of Atatürk being confronted about his alleged Dönme ancestry, by one of his best friends, Nuri Conker. The event was narrated by Atatürk's butler Cemal Granda. It is " the only instance where we have a direct statement from Atatürk in response to such allegations". Atatürk gave the following reply:

For me as well as some people want to say that I’m a Jew — because I was born in Salonica. But it must not be forgotten that Napoleon was an Italian from Corsica, yet he died a Frenchman and has passed into history as such. People have to serve the society in which they find themselves.

== See also ==
- Allahdad
- Banu Israil
- Chala
- Converso
- Disputation of Barcelona (1263)
- Disputation of Tortosa (1413–1414)
- Falash Mura
- Frankism
- History of the Jews in the Ottoman Empire
- History of the Jews in Turkey
- Neofiti
- Subbotniks
- Zera Yisrael

== Bibliography ==
- Kieser, Hans-Lukas (26 June 2018), Talaat Pasha: Father of Modern Turkey, Architect of Genocide, Princeton University Press, ISBN 978-0-691-15762-7
- Bali, Rıfat N. (24 June 2010). A Scapegoat for All Seasons: The Dönmes or Crypto-Jews of Turkey e. Gorgias Press. pp. 17–88. doi:10.31826/9781463225568-004. ISBN 978-1-4632-2556-8.
