= Benjamin Simmons =

Benjamin Simmons may refer to:

- Ben Simmons (born 1996), Australian basketball player
- Benjamin Stanley Simmons or B. Stanley Simmons (1871–1931), American architect.
- Benjamin Taylor Simmons (1871–1933), American general
- Benjamin Simmons (politician), South Carolina legislator

== See also ==
- Benjamin Simons, British theoretical physicist
- Ben Simons (disambiguation)
