= Ben Simon (disambiguation) =

Ben Simon (born 1978) is an American ice hockey player

Ben Simon may also refer to:

- Ben Simon (baseball) (born 2002), American baseball player
- Ruben Sim (Benjamin Robert Simon, born 1997), American YouTuber

== Surname ==
- Daniel Ben-Simon (born 1954), Israeli journalist and politician
- Netanel Ben Simon (born 1992), Israeli footballer
- Yogev Ben Simon (born 1986), Israeli footballer

== Patronymic ==
- Eleazar ben Simon, 1st century CE Zealot leader
- Joseph Cabi ben Simon, 1st century CE High Priest of Israel
- Moses ben Simeon or Moses Frankfurter, Rabbi and printer of Amsterdam

== See also ==
- Ben Shimon
- Ben Simons (disambiguation)

=== Part of patronymic ===
- Elioneus ben Simon Cantatheras
- Joshua Boaz ben Simon Baruch, Spanish rabbi
- Solomon ben Simon Duran
- Abraham Joseph ben Simon Wolf Menz
