= Abraham Joseph =

Abraham Joseph or Abraham-Joseph may refer to:

- Abraham Joseph Ash (1813–1888), rabbi
- Abraham Joseph Balaban (1889–1962), American showman
- Abraham-Joseph Bénard (1750–1822), French actor
- Abraham Joseph Hasbrouck (1773–1845), American politician
- Abraham Joseph Menz, 18th-century rabbi and mathematician
- Shéyaa Bin Abraham-Joseph (born 1992), American and British rapper, known as 21 Savage
- Abraham ben Joseph of Orleans, 12th-century French Tosafist
