= General Simmons =

General Simmons may refer to:

- Benjamin Taylor Simmons (1871–1933), U.S. Army brigadier general
- Dana A. Simmons (fl. 1970s–2010s), U.S. Air Force brigadier general
- Edwin H. Simmons (1921–2007), U.S. Marine Corps brigadier general
- Frank Keith Simmons (1888–1952), British Army major general
- Lintorn Simmons (1821–1903), British Army general

== See also ==
- George S. Simonds (1874–1938), U.S. Army major general
- Guy Simonds (1903–1974), Canadian Army lieutenant general
- Henry Simon (general) (1921–2016), U.S. Air Force major general
- Max Simon (1899–1961), German Waffen-SS general
