= Expulsion of Jews from Spain =

Ethnic cleansing of Jews from Spain

On 31 March 1492, the Catholic Monarchs of Spain, King Ferdinand II of Aragon and Queen Isabella I of Castile, issued the Alhambra Decree, ordering all unconverted Jews to leave their kingdoms and territories by the end of July that year, unless they converted to Christianity. Motivated by a desire for religious unity following the completion of the Reconquista and amid fears that unconverted Jews were influencing conversos (Jewish converts to Christianity) to revert to Judaism, the decree brought to an end more than a millennium of Jewish presence in the Iberian Peninsula. It is considered a consequential event in Spanish and Jewish history.

In the decades before 1492, successive crises had already thinned Spain's Jewish population through violence, forced conversion, and legal discrimination. In the aftermath of the 1391 massacres, large numbers of Jews converted to Catholicism. Continued attacks produced about 50,000 additional conversions by 1415. Authorities suspected that some conversos continued to practice Judaism in secret; concerns over such "Judaizing" helped motivate the creation of the Spanish Inquisition in 1478, which investigated cases of heresy and, in some instances, used torture and imposed penalties up to execution for the unrepentant. Growing limpieza de sangre ("purity-of-blood") statutes in the 15th century further stigmatized "New Christians" of Jewish descent.

After the fall of Granada in January 1492, the Catholic Monarchs, urged on by Grand Inquisitor Tomás de Torquemada, moved from consolidating territorial unity to enforcing religious uniformity, culminating in the Alhambra Decree of March 31. Many of those who remained decided to convert to avoid expulsion; modern estimates generally place the number expelled between 40,000 and 200,000 out of a population of 300,000, although figures remain debated. An unknown number also returned to Spain in the following years. Following the expulsions many first crossed into Portugal (1492–96) before facing forced conversion in 1497; others moved to Navarre, which expelled its Jews in 1498. The Inquisition continued to prosecute suspected crypto-Jews for centuries in Spain and across its overseas tribunals, conducting autos-da-fé well into the 18th century. The mass expulsion created a large Sephardic Jewish diaspora throughout the Mediterranean world — in the Maghreb (notably in Tétouan, Fes, Oran, and Djerba), the Italian states, and the Ottoman Empire (notably in Istanbul, Salonika, İzmir, Sarajevo, Jerusalem, and Safed). Smaller communities reached southern France, and, during the 16th–17th centuries, Antwerp, Amsterdam, Hamburg, and London attracted merchant families. For centuries, many Sephardic communities preserved Judaeo-Spanish (Ladino).

In 1924, the regime of Miguel Primo de Rivera granted Spanish citizenship to a part of the Sephardic Jewish diaspora. The edict was formally and symbolically revoked on December 16, 1968, following the Second Vatican Council, by the regime of Francisco Franco. This occurred a full century after Jews had openly begun to practice their religion in Spain and synagogues were once more legal places of worship under Spain's Laws of Religious Freedom. In 2015, the Cortes Generales of Spain passed a law whereby the descendants of Sephardic Jews could obtain Spanish nationality by naturalisation to "compensate for shameful events in the country's past." Jews who could prove that they are the descendants of those expelled from Spain due to the Alhambra Decree could "become Spaniards without leaving home or giving up their present nationality." The deadline to apply was October 1, 2019.

== Background ==
=== Jews in Peninsular states ===
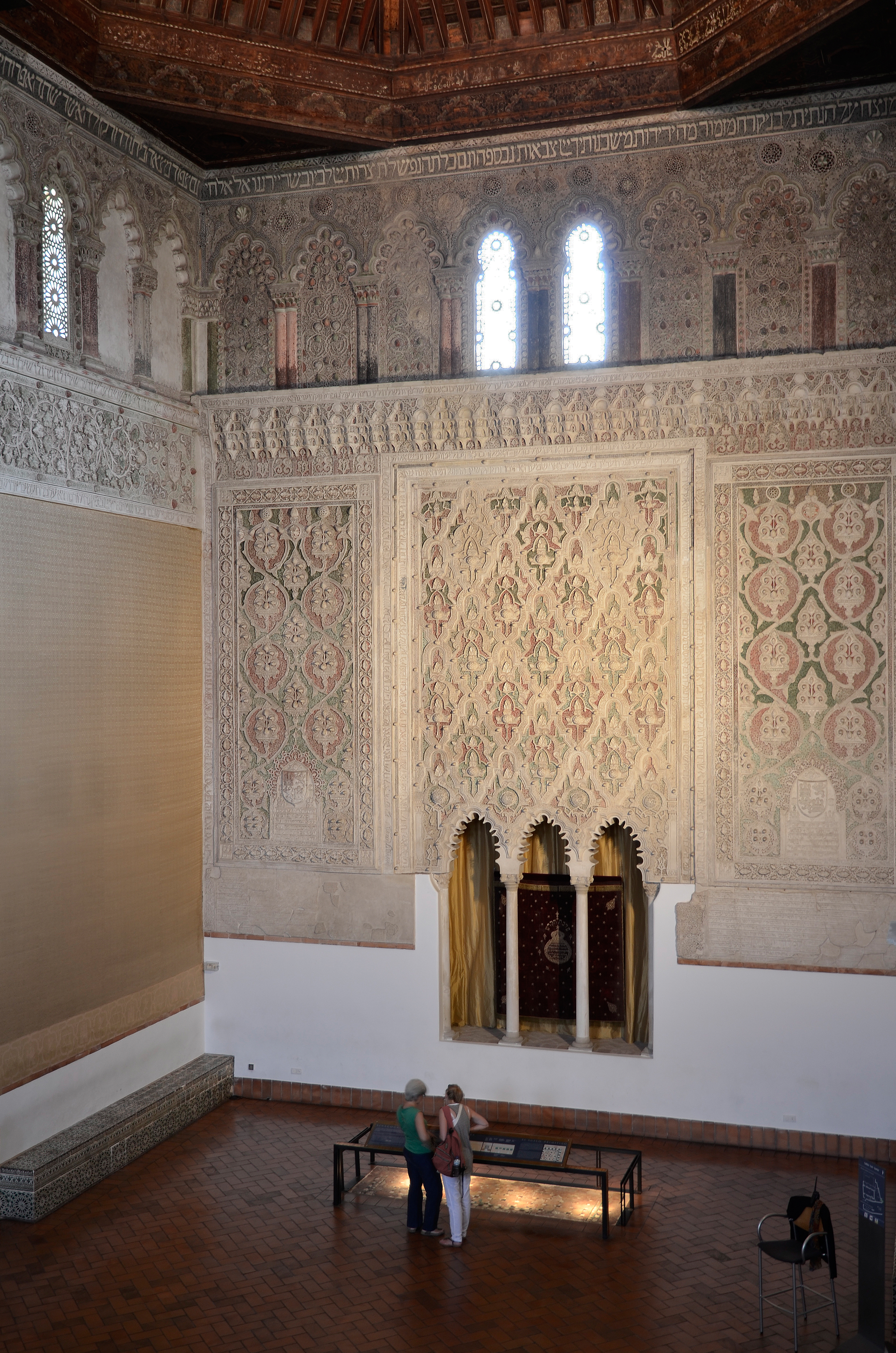
Interior of the Synagogue of El Transito of Toledo

Jews have lived in the Iberian Peninsula since at least the Roman period. Under the Visigothic kingdom (6th–7th centuries), church councils at Toledo promulgated increasingly harsh anti-Jewish laws, including episodes of forced baptism. Later, upon the Islamic conquest, the Jewish population came under Islamic rule of Al-Andalus. María Rosa Menocal wrote that Jews under Muslim rule were dhimmis with reduced rights relative to Muslims, but were still generally in a better position than other European Jews living under Christian rule. Mark R. Cohen, whose book Under Cross and Crescent reviewed the treatment of medieval Jews, writes that while there were significant restrictions on Jews in Islamic states, they did not suffer serfdom, supersessionist oppression, and demonisation like the Jews of Christendom.

Darío Fernández-Morera states that the supposed harmony between Jews and Muslims in Spain was an exaggeration that proliferated in the 19th century. However, this position has been strongly criticized as far-right Islamophobia.

Fernández-Morera uses the case of medieval Spain to further an explicitly extreme right-wing and conservative Christian political and cultural agenda as it bears upon debates about politics, the establishment of religion and the very place of the academy in civic life.

=== Expulsion ===
On January 2, 1492, the Catholic Monarchs of Spain conquered the Emirate of Granada. The last Muslim king, Muhammad XI (Spanish: Boabdil), withdrew to Alpujarras in an event that ended the Reconquista, although the idea of a continuous or tightly orchestrated Reconquista has been challenged by modern scholars.

A letter sent by the Catholic Monarchs to the Bilbao City Council in 1490 stated that under canon law and the laws of the kingdoms, Jews were tolerated and allowed to live in the kingdoms as subjects and vassals. Joseph Pérez considers that "the myth of the 'Spain of the three cultures,' widely used as an element of propaganda, is so far detached from historical reality that it can only generate new elements of confusion." In Christian kingdoms, according to Henry Kamen, both Jews and Muslims were treated "with contempt" and the three communities "lived separate existences." In Muslim kingdoms, on the other hand, Christians and Jews were required to pay a tax to profess their religion.

In the twelfth and thirteenth centuries, Christian anti-Judaism in the West had intensified, which was reflected in the harsh anti-Jewish measures agreed at the Fourth Council of the Lateran called in 1215 by Pope Innocent III. The peninsular Christian kingdoms were not at all oblivious to the growth of increasingly belligerent anti-Judaism – the Castilian statutory code of Siete Partidas stated that the Jews lived among Christians "so that their presence reminds them that they descend from those who crucified Our Lord Jesus Christ", but the kings continued to "protect" the Jews for the important role they played in their kingdoms.

In the fourteenth century, the period of relative tolerance towards the Jews ended, passing into a phase of increasing conflict.

What changes are not the mentalities, it is the circumstances. The good times of the Spain of the three religions had coincided with a phase of territorial, demographic, and economic expansion, in which Jews and Christians did not compete in the labor market: both the former and the latter had contributed to the general prosperity and shared their benefits. The militant anti-Judaism of the Church and the mendicant orders barely found an echo. The social, economic and political changes of the 14th century, however, including the wars and natural disasters that preceded and followed the Black Plague, created a new situation. [...] [The people] believed they were victims of a curse, punished for sins they must have committed. The clergy invited the faithful to repent, change their behavior, and return to God. It was then that the presence of the "deicidal people" among Christians was considered scandalous.

=== The Jewish massacres of 1391 and their consequences ===
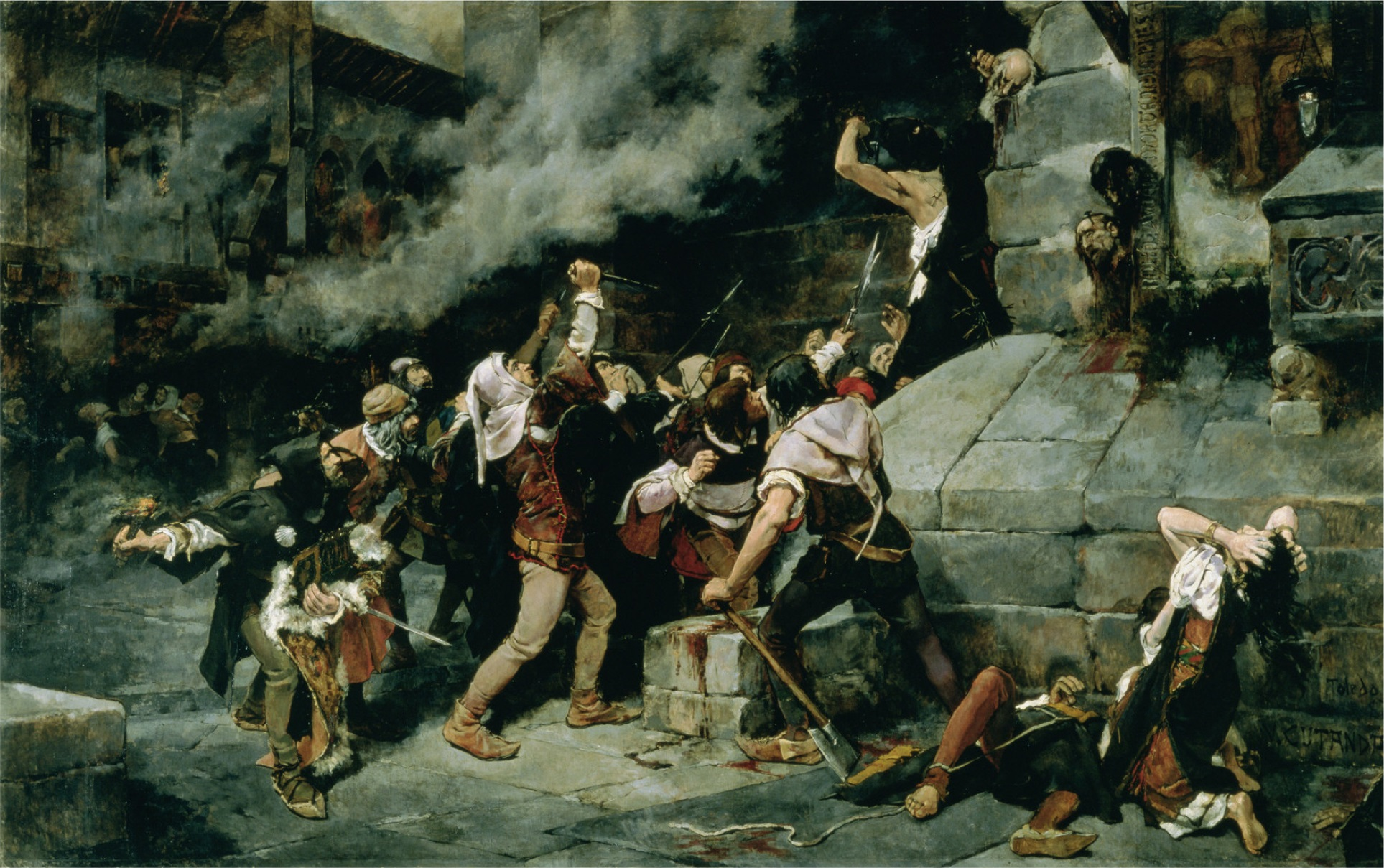
At the Feet of the Saviour, massacre of Jews in Toledo, oil on canvas by Vicente Cutanda (1887)

The first wave of violence against the Jews on the Iberian Peninsula occurred in the Kingdom of Navarre as a consequence of the arrival of the Shepherds' Crusade across the Pyrenees in 1321. The Jewish communities of Pamplona and Estella-Lizarra were massacred. Two decades later, the impact of the Black Death of 1348 provoked assaults on the Jewish quarters (Spanish: juderías) of several places, especially Barcelona and other places in the Principality of Catalonia.

In the Crown of Castile, anti-Jewish violence was closely related to the civil war during the reign of Peter of Castile. In this conflict, the side supporting Enrique de Trastámara (later King Henry II of Castile) used anti-Judaism as a propaganda weapon, and the pretender to the throne accused his stepbrother, Peter of Castile, of favoring the Jews. The first slaughter of Jews, in Toledo in 1355, was carried out by the supporters of Enrique de Trastámara when they entered the city. The same happened eleven years later when they occupied Briviesca.

In Burgos, Jews who could not pay the large tribute imposed on them in 1366 were enslaved and sold. In 1367 in Valladolid, Jews were assaulted to shouts of "Long live King Henry!" There were no deaths, but the synagogues were burned down.

Slaughter of Jews in Barcelona in 1391 by Josep Segrelles, c. 1910

The great catastrophe for the Jews took place in 1391 when the communities of Castile and the Crown of Aragon were massacred. The assaults, fires, looting, and slaughter began in June, in Seville, where Ferrand Martínez , archdeacon of Écija, took advantage of the power vacuum created by the death of the archbishop of Seville. Hardening his preaching against the Jews that had begun in 1378, he ordered the overthrow of synagogues and the seizure of prayer books. In January 1391, an assault on the Jewish quarter was avoided by the municipal authorities, but in June, hundreds of Jews were murdered, their houses were ransacked, and their synagogues were converted into churches. Some Jews managed to escape; others, terrified, asked to be baptized.

From Seville, anti-Jewish violence extended throughout Andalusia, and then towards other parts of Castile. In August, it reached the crown of Aragon. Murders, looting, and fires occurred everywhere. The Jews who managed to survive either fled, many seeking refuge in the kingdoms of Navarre, Portugal and France, and in North Africa, or chose baptism to avoid death. It is difficult to be certain of the number of victims. In Barcelona some 400 Jews were murdered; in Valencia, 250; and in Lérida, 68.

After the Massacre of 1391, anti-Jewish measures were intensified. In Castile in 1412, Jewish men had to let their beards grow, and Jews were required to wear a distinctive red badge sewn to their clothes, so they could be recognized. In the Crown of Aragon, possession of the Talmud was declared unlawful, and the number of synagogues was limited to one per Jewish community (aljama). In addition, the mendicant orders intensified their campaign of proselytism to make Jews convert to Christianity. The Dominican Vincent Ferrer of Valencia played a prominent role in this campaign, which had the support of the monarchs. In the Crown of Aragon, it was decreed that Jews were obligated to attend three sermons a year. As a result of the massacres of 1391 and the measures that followed, by 1415 more than half of the Jews of the crowns of Castile and Aragon had renounced Mosaic law and had been baptized, including many rabbis and important members of the community.

=== Jews in the fifteenth century ===
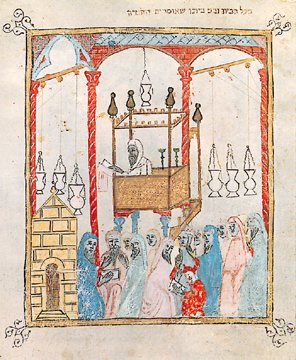
Miniature of a Spanish haggadah of the 14th century

After the massacres of 1391 and the preaching that followed them, by 1415 scarcely 100,000 Jews continued to practice their religion in the crowns of Castile and Aragon. The historian Joseph Perez explains that "Spanish Judaism [would] never recover from this catastrophe." The Jewish community "came out of the crisis not only physically diminished but morally and intellectually shattered".

In the Crown of Aragon, Judaism virtually disappeared in important places such as Barcelona, Valencia, and Palma – in 1424 the Barcelona Jewry was abolished because it was considered unnecessary – and only the one in Zaragoza remained. In Castile, once-flourishing aljamas such as those of Seville, Toledo, and Burgos lost many of their members; in 1492, the year of the expulsion, in the Crown of Aragon only a quarter of the former number of Jews remained. The famous Jewish community of Gerona, for example, was left with only 24 families. In the Crown of Castile, there were less than 80,000. In Seville before the revolts of 1391, there were about 500 Jewish families. According to Joseph Perez, at the time of the expulsion, there were fewer than 150,000 Jews, distributed in 35 aljamas of the Crown of Aragon and 216 in the Crown of Castile. In both Crowns, it was observed that the Jews had left the great cities and lived in the small and rural areas, less exposed "to the excesses of the Christians."

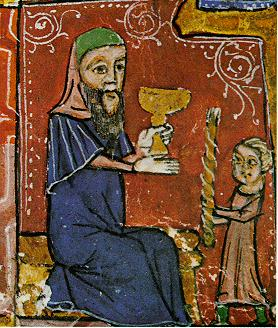
Jewish man celebrating havdalah, detail of 14th century miniature.

After the critical period of 1391–1415, the pressure on Jews to recuperate their confiscated synagogues and books had decreased, and they were then able to avoid certain obligations such as carrying the red ribbon or attending friars' sermons. They were also able to reconstruct the internal organization of the aljamas and their religious activities, thanks to the agreements reached by the procurators of the aljamas gathered in Valladolid in 1432 and sanctioned by the king, which meant that "the Crown of Castile accepts again officially that a minority of its subjects has another religion than the Christian one and recognizes the right of this minority to exist legally, with a legal status." "In this way, the Jewish community is rebuilt with the approval of the crown." Abraham Benveniste, who presided over the meeting of Valladolid, was appointed court rabbi with authority over all the Jews of the kingdom, and at the same time as delegate of the king over them.

During the reign of the Catholic Monarchs, in the last quarter of the 15th century, many Jews lived in rural villages and engaged in agricultural activities. Crafts and trade were not monopolized – international trade had passed into the hands of converts. While Jews continued to trade as money-lenders, the number of Christian lenders had increased by a large percentage. Jews also continued to collect royal, ecclesiastical, and seigniorial rents, but their importance there had also diminished – in Castile they were only in charge of a quarter of the revenues. However, in the court of Castile – but not in the crown of Aragon – Jews held important administrative and financial positions. Abraham Senior was from 1488 treasurer-major of the Holy Brotherhood, a key organ in the financing of the Granada War, and also chief rabbi of Castile. Yucé Abravanel was "A greater collector of the service and mountaineering of the herds, one of the more healthy income and greater yield of the Crown of Castile." However, according to Joseph Perez, the role of the Jews in the court must not be exaggerated. "The truth was that the state could do without the Jews, both in the bureaucratic apparatus and in the management of the estate."

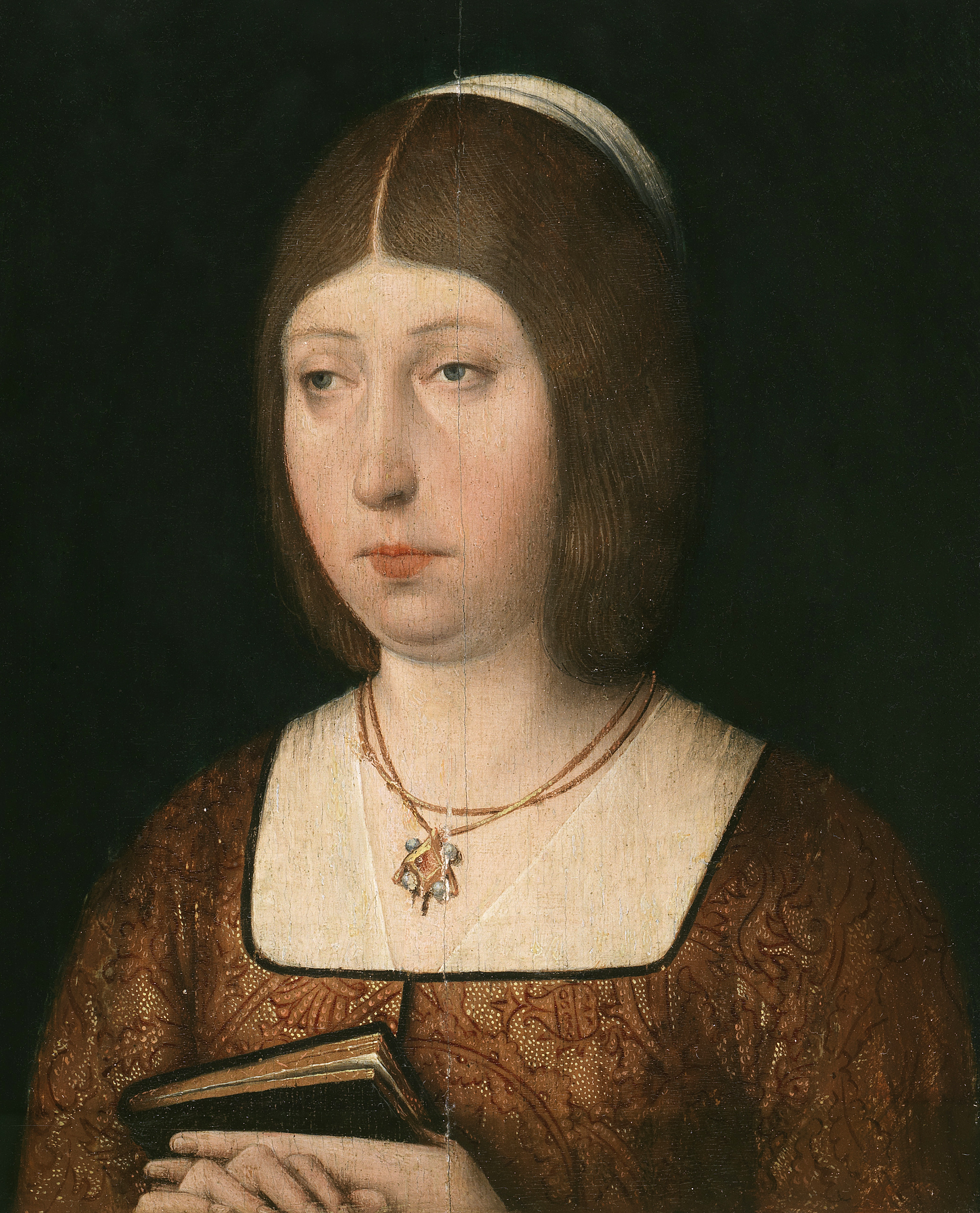
Isabel I of Castile

The Hebrew community at the end of the 15th century was therefore far from rich and influential. "In fact, the Spanish Jews at the time of their expulsion did not form a homogeneous social group. There were classes among them as in Christian society, a small minority of very rich and well-placed men, together with a mass of small people: farmers, artisans, shopkeepers." What united them was that they practiced the same faith, different from the one recognized, which made them a separate community within the monarchy and which was "property" of the crown which thereby protected them. In a letter dated July 7, 1477, addressed to the authorities of Trujillo, where incidents had occurred against the Jews, Queen Isabella I of Castile, after putting the aljama under her protection and prohibiting all type of oppression or humiliation against its members, states:

All the Jews of my kingdoms are mine and are under my protection, and it is for me to defend and protect them and to keep them in justice.

Thus, the Jews "formed not a State in the State, but rather a micro-society next to the majority Christian society, with an authority, the crown rabbi, that the crown delegated to it over its members." The aljamas were organized internally with a wide margin of autonomy. They designated by lottery the council of elders that governed the life of the community; collecting their own taxes for the maintenance of worship, synagogues, and rabbinical teaching; lived under the norms of Jewish law; and had their own courts that heard all cases in civil matters – since the Cortes de Madrigal of 1476, criminal cases had passed to the royal courts. But Jews did not enjoy full civil rights: they had a specific tax system far more burdensome than that of Christians and were excluded from positions that could confer authority over Christians.

The situation in which the Jews lived, according to Joseph Perez, posed two problems: "As subjects and vassals of the king, the Jews had no guarantee for the future – the monarch could at any time close the autonomy of the aljamas or require new Most important taxes"; and, above all, "in these late years of the Middle Ages, when a state of modern character was being developed, there could be no question of a problem of immense importance: was the existence of separate and autonomous communities compatible with the demands of a modern state? This was the real question."

=== Conversos and the Inquisition ===
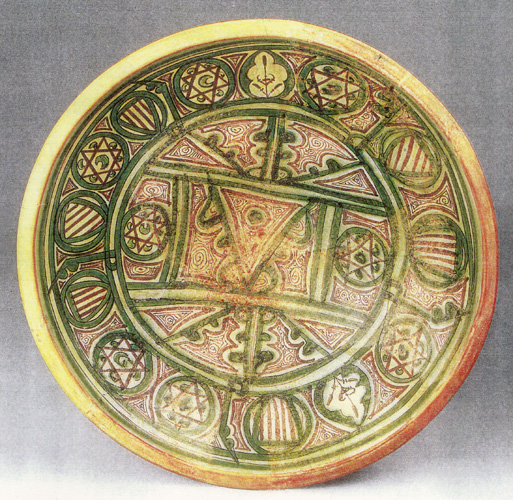
Judeo-Spanish dish of the 14th century

In the 15th century, the main problem stopped being the Jews becoming conversos, who, according to Henry Kamen, probably numbered around three hundred thousand people. “Christian convert” was the term applied to Jews who had been baptized and their descendants. As many of them had been forcibly converted, they were often looked upon with distrust by those who considered themselves Old Christians. The positions abandoned by Jews were mostly filled by converts, who congregated where Jewish communities had flourished before 1391, doing work formerly performed by Jews – trade and crafts – with the added advantage that as Christians they could now access trades and professions previously forbidden to Jews. Some even entered the clergy, becoming canons, priors and even bishops.

The socio-economic position of converts was viewed with suspicion by the "old" Christians, a resentment that was accentuated by the conscience on the part of those who had a differentiated identity, proud of being Christians and having Jewish ancestry, which was the lineage of Christ. Popular revolts broke out against the converts between 1449 and 1474, a period in Castile of economic difficulties and political crisis (especially during the civil war of the reign of Henry IV). The first and largest of these revolts took place in 1449 in Toledo, during which a "Judgment–Statute" was approved that prohibited access to municipal positions by "any confessor of Jewish lineage" – an antecedent of the blood-purity statutes of the following century. The origin of the revolts was economic in Andalusia especially because there was a situation of hunger, aggravated by an epidemic of plague – and in principle "not directed especially against the converts. ... It was the parties and the demagogues that took advantage of the exasperation of the people and directed it against the converts."

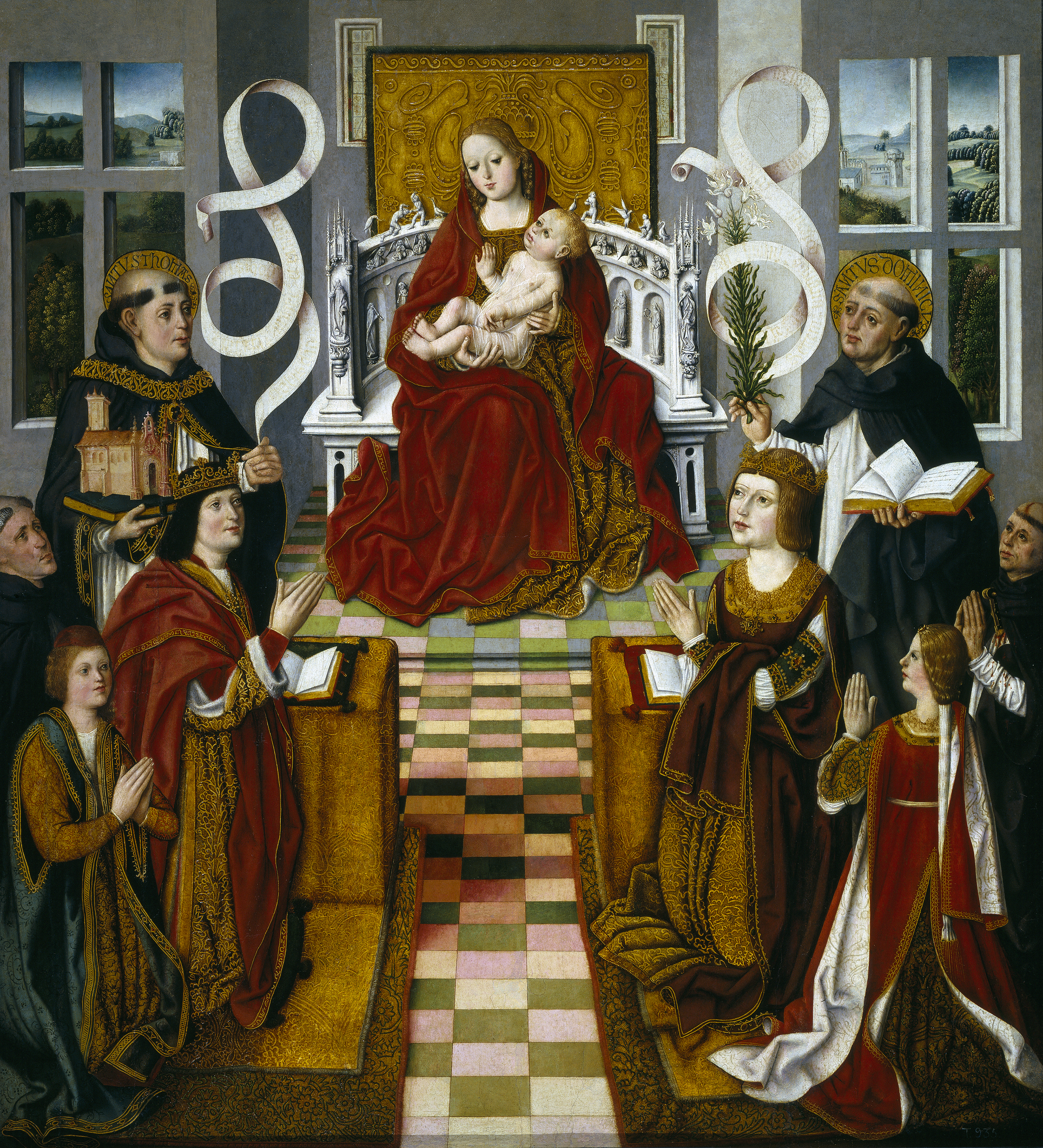
The painting Virgen de los Reyes Católicos in which appears kneeling behind the king Ferdinand the Catholic, the inquisitor general Tomás de Torquemada and kneeling behind the queen the inquisitor of Aragon Pedro of Arbués

To justify the attacks on converts, they affirmed that conversos were false Christians and that they still practiced the Jewish religion in secret. According to Joseph Perez, it is a proven fact that, among those who converted to escape the blind furor of the masses in 1391, or by the pressure of the proselytizing campaigns of the early fifteenth century, some clandestinely returned to their old faith when it seemed that the danger had passed, of which it is said that they "Judaized". The accusation of Crypto-Judaism became more plausible when some cases arose of prominent converts who continued to observe Jewish rites after their conversion. But Judaizers, according to Joseph Perez, were a minority, although relatively important. Henry Kamen says that "it can be affirmed that at the end of the 1470s, there was no Judaizing movement highlighted or proven among the converts." He also points out that when a convert was accused of Judaizing, in many cases the "proofs" that were brought were, in fact, cultural elements of his Jewish ancestry – such as treating Saturday, not Sunday, as the day of rest – or the lack of knowledge of the new faith, such as not knowing the creed or eating meat during Lent.

This is how the "converso problem" was born. The baptized cannot renounce their faith according to the canonical doctrine of the Church, which considers Crypto-Judaism to be heresy that must be punished. This is how various voices began to claim, including those of some converts who do not want to question the sincerity of their baptism because of those "false" Christians who are beginning to be called Marranos. And it also bolstered the idea that the presence of the Jews among the Christians is what invites the converts to continue practicing the Law of Moses.

When Isabel I of Castile ascended to the throne in 1474, she was already married to the heir to the Crown of Aragon, the future Ferdinand II of Aragon. At this time, there was no punishment for practicing crypto-Judaism, not out of tolerance for Jews, but for legalistic reasons. (Note: Crypto-Judaism was not punished: "Certainly not because of tolerance or indifference, but because they lacked the appropriate legal instruments in order to define it as a crime." (Spanish: "No, por cierto, por tolerancia o indiferencia, sino porque se carecía de instrumentos jurídicos apropiados para caracterizar este tipo de delito.")) They decided to confront the "converso problem," especially after having received some alarming reports in 1475 by the Prior of the Dominicans of Seville, Friar Alonso de Ojeda, (Note: Friar Alonso De Ojeda: this is not Alonso de Ojeda, Spanish navigator and conquistador, but a close relative of his with the same name.) who reported that there were a large number of conversos in that city secretly practicing their religion in private, some even doing so openly. After receiving these reports, the monarchs applied to Pope Sixtus IV for authorization to name a number of inquisitors in their kingdom, which the pontiff agreed to in his bull Exigit sincerae devotionis of 1 November 1478. "With the creation of the Tribunal of the Inquisition, (Note: Tribunal of the Inquisition: officially, "Tribunal of the Holy Office of the Inquisition" (Spanish: Tribunal del Santo Oficio de la Inquisición) normally known in English as the Spanish Inquisition.) the authorities will have sufficient instruments and methods of investigation at their disposal." According to Joseph Pérez, Ferdinand and Isabella "were convinced that the Inquisition would force the conversos to assimilate into society once and for all: the day when all of the new Christians would renounce Judaism, and nothing would distinguish them anymore from any other member of society."

== Expulsion ==
=== Segregation of the Jews (1480) ===
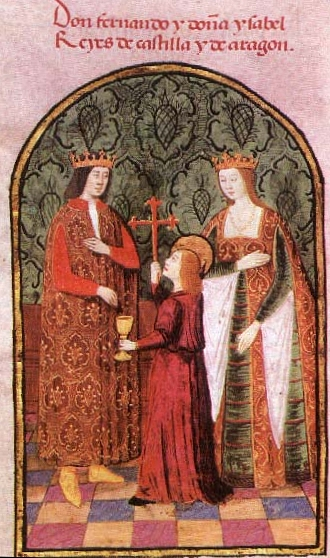
Isabel I of Castile and Fernando II of Aragon.

From the beginning of their reign, Isabel and Ferdinand were concerned with protecting Jews – since they were "property" of the crown. For example, on September 6, 1477, in a letter addressed to the Jewish community of Seville, Queen Isabel I gave assurances about their safety:

I take under my protection the Jews of the aljamas in general and each one in particular, as well as their persons and their property; I protect them against any attack, whatever their nature ...; I forbid that they be attacked, killed or injured; I also forbid that they adopt a passive attitude if they are attacked, killed or injured.

Hence, even the Catholic Monarchs were reputed to be favorable to the Jews until 1492. This is what the German traveler, Nicolas de Popielovo said, for example, after his visit in 1484–1485:

Her subjects from Catalonia and Aragon speak publicly, and I have heard the same thing from many in Spain that the Queen is the protector of the Jews and the daughter of a Jewess.

But the monarchs could not do away with all the vexations and discrimination suffered by the Jews, encouraged on many occasions by the preaching of the friars from the mendicant orders. They decided to segregate the Jews to end the conflict. Already in the Cortes of Madrigal of 1476, the monarchs had protested the breach of the provisions in the Order of 1412 on the Jews – prohibition to wear luxury dresses; obligation to wear a red slice on the right shoulder; prohibition to hold positions with authority over Christians, to have Christian servants, to lend money at usurious interest, etc. But in the Cortes de Toledo of 1480, they decided to go much further to fulfill these norms: to force the Jews to live in separate quarters, where they could not leave except during daytime to carry out their professional occupations. Until then, the Jewish quarters – where the Jews used to live and where they had their synagogues, butchers, etc. – had not formed a separate world in the cities. There were also Christians living in them and Jews living outside them. From 1480 onwards, the Jewish quarters were converted into ghettos surrounded by walls, and the Jews were confined in them to avoid confusion and damage to Christianity. A term of two years was established for the process, but it lasted for more than ten years and was not exempt from problems and abuses by Christians.

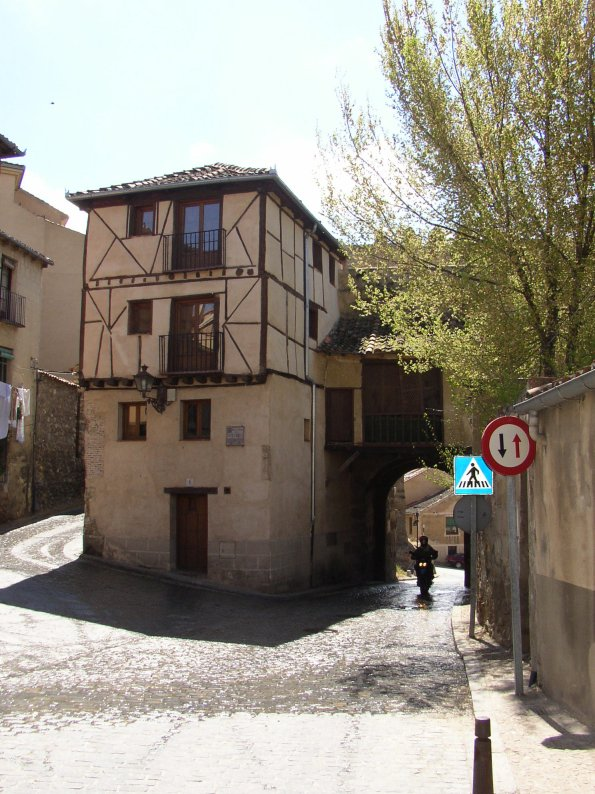
Descent to the Gate of San Andrés, in the judería of Segovia

The text approved by the Cortes, which also applied to the Muslims of the region, read as follows:

We send to the aljamas of the said Jews and Moors: that each of them be put in said separation [by] such procedure and such order that within the said term of the said two years they [shall] have the said houses of their separation, and live and die in them, and henceforth not have their dwellings among the Christians or elsewhere outside the designated areas and places that have been assigned to the said Jewish and Moorish quarters.

The decision of the kings approved by the Courts of Toledo had antecedents, since Jews already had been confined in some Castilian localities like Cáceres or Soria. In this last locality it had been carried out with the monarchs' approval "to avoid the harms that followed from the Jews living, dwelling, and being present among the Christians." Fray Hernando de Talavera, the queen's confessor and who had opposed the use of force to solve the "converso problem," also justified the segregation "by avoiding many sins that follow from the mixture and a great deal of familiarity [between Christians and Jews] and from not keeping everything that, encompassing their conversation with Christians, by holy canons and civil laws is ordered and commanded."

With the decision to detain Jews in ghettos, it was not only a question of separating them from Christians and of protecting them, but also of imposing a series of obstacles to their activities, so that they would have no choice but "to give up their status as Jews if they want to lead a normal existence. Their conversion is not demanded – not yet – nor is their autonomous statute touched, but it continues with them in such a way that they end up convincing themselves that the only solution is conversion."

=== The expulsion of the Jews from Andalusia (1483) ===
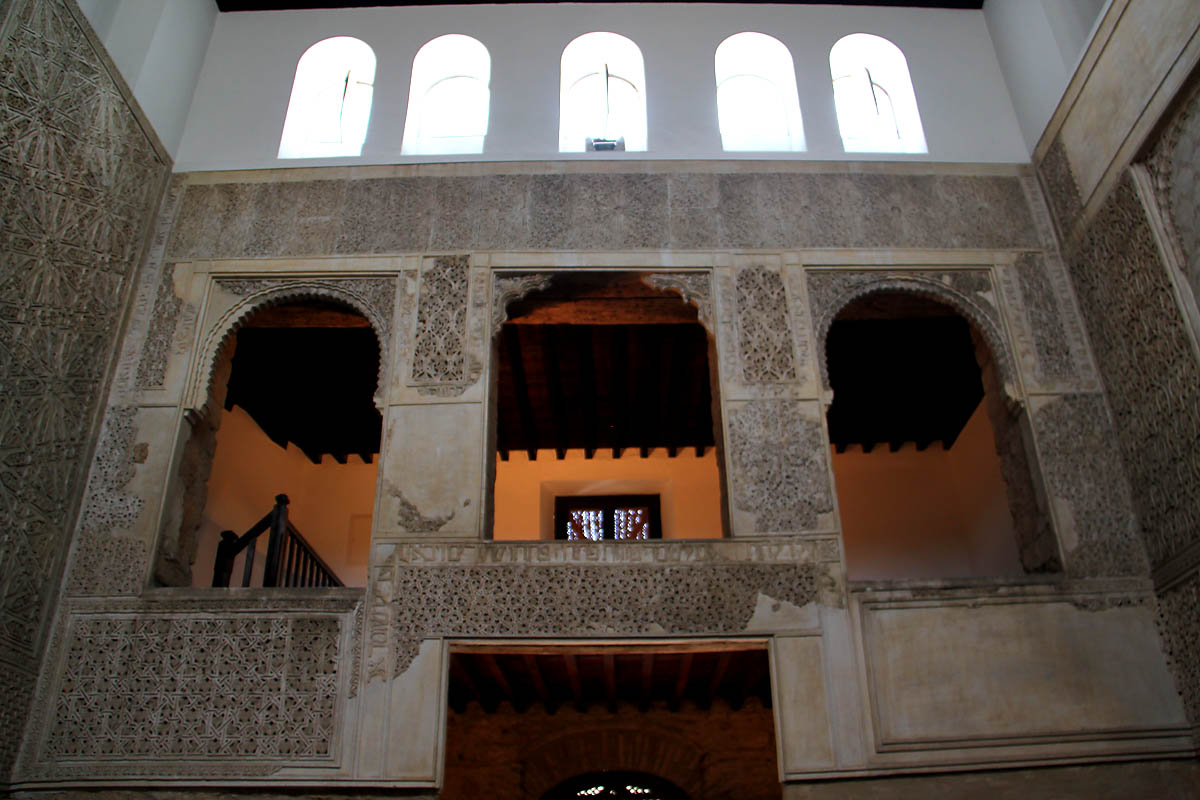
Interior of the Córdoba Synagogue.

The first inquisitors appointed by the kings arrived in Seville in November 1480, "immediately sowing terror." During the first years, in this city alone, they pronounced 700 death sentences and more than 5,000 "reconciliations" – that is, prison sentences, exile or simple penances – accompanied by confiscation of their property and disqualification for public office and ecclesiastical benefits.

Over the course of their inquiries, the inquisitors discovered that for a long time many converts had been meeting with their Jewish relatives to celebrate Jewish holidays and even attend synagogues. This convinced them that they would not be able to put an end to crypto-Judaism if converts continued to maintain contact with the Jews, so they asked the monarchs for the Jews to be expelled from Andalusia. This request was approved and in 1483, the monarchs gave six months for the Jews of the dioceses of Seville, Cordoba, and Cadiz to go to Extremadura. There are doubts as to whether the order was strictly enforced, since at the time of the final expulsion in 1492 some chroniclers speak of the fact that 8,000 families of Andalusia embarked in Cadiz and others in Cartagena and the ports of the Crown of Aragon. On the other hand, the expulsion of the Jews of Saragossa and Teruel was also proposed, but in the end, it was not carried out.

According to Julio Valdeón, the decision to expel the Jews from Andalusia also obeyed "the desire to move them away from the border between the crown of Castile and the Nasrid Kingdom of Granada, the scene, during the 1480s and the first years of the 1490s, of the war that ended with the disappearance of the last stronghold of peninsular Islam."

=== The genesis of the expulsion decree ===
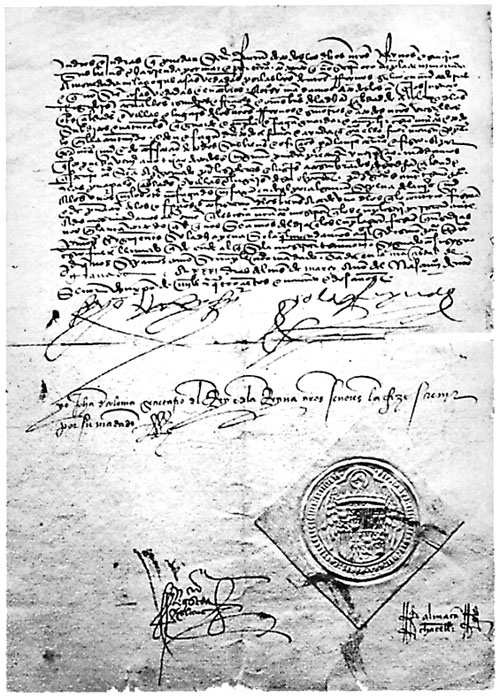
Sealed copy of the Edict of Granada.

On March 31, 1492, shortly after the end of the Granada War, the Catholic Monarchs signed the decree of expulsion of the Jews in Granada, which was sent to all the cities, towns and lordships of their kingdoms with strict orders to not read it or make it public until May 1. It is possible that some prominent Jews tried to nullify or soften it but did not have any success. Among these Jews, Isaac Abravanel stands out, who offered King Ferdinand a considerable sum of money. According to a well-known legend, when Inquisitor General Tomás de Torquemada discovered this, he presented himself before the king and threw a crucifix at his feet, saying: "Judas sold our Lord for thirty pieces of silver; His Majesty is about to sell it again for thirty thousand." According to the Israeli historian Benzion Netanyahu, quoted by Julio Valdeón, when Abravanel met with Queen Isabella, she said to him: "'Do you think this comes from me? The Lord has put that thought into the heart of the King?"

A few months before, an auto da fe was held in Avila in which three converts and two Jews condemned by the Inquisition were burnt alive for an alleged ritual crime against a Christian child (who will be known as the [Child of the Guard]) contributed to create the propitious environment for the expulsion.

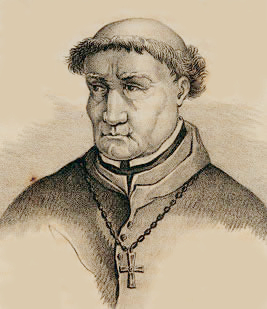
Tomas de Torquemada, first inquisitor general.

The Catholic Monarchs had precisely entrusted to the inquisitor general Tomás de Torquemada and its collaborators the writing of the decree fixing to them, according to the historian Luis Suarez, three previous conditions which would be reflected in the document: to justify the expulsion by charging Jews with two sufficiently serious offenses – usury and "heretical practice"; That there should be sufficient time for Jews to choose between baptism or exile; And that those who remained faithful to the Mosaic law could dispose of their movable and immovable property, although with the provisos established by the laws: they could not take either gold, silver, or horses. Torquemada presented the draft decree to the monarchs on March 20, 1492, and the monarchs signed and published it in Granada on March 31. According to Joseph Pérez, that the monarchs commissioned the drafting of the decree to Torquemada "demonstrates the leading role of the Inquisition in that matter."

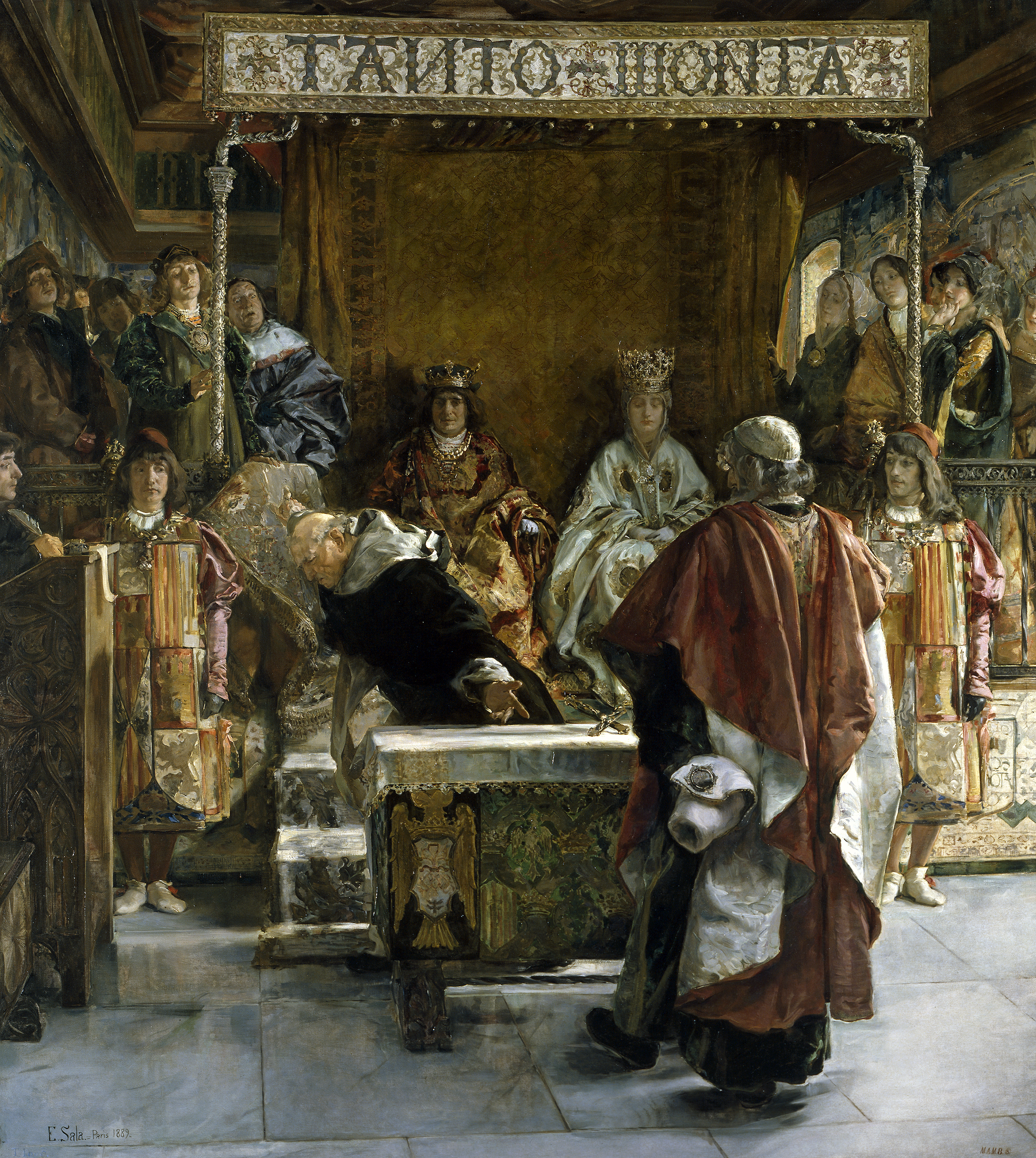
Tomás de Torquemada presents the 1492 Edict of Expulsion to the Catholic Monarchs. Oil by Emilio Sala Francés (1889)

Of the decree promulgated in Granada on March 31, which was based on the draft decree of Torquemada – drawn up "with the will and consent of their highnesses" and which is dated March 20 in Santa Fe – there are two versions: One signed by the two monarchs and valid for the Crown of Castile and another signed only by King Ferdinand and valid for the Crown of Aragon. Between the draft decree of Torquemada and the two final versions, there exist, according to Joseph Pérez, "significant variants." In contrast to the Torquemada project and the Castilian decree, in the version addressed to the Crown of Aragon:

- The advocacy of the Inquisition is recognized – "Persuading us, the venerable father prior of Santa Cruz [Torquemada], inquisitor general of the said heretical iniquity...";
- Usury is mentioned as one of the two crimes of which the Jews are accused: "We find the said Jews, by means of great and unbearable usury, to devour and absorb the properties and substances of Christians";
- The official position is reaffirmed that only the Crown can decide the fate of the Jews since they are the possession of the monarchs – "they are ours," it is said;
- And it contains more insulting expressions against the Jews: they are accused of making fun of the laws of Christians and of considering them idolatrous; it mentions the abominable circumstances and of Jewish perfidy; labels Judaism as "leprosy"; and it recalls that the Jews "by their own fault are subject to perpetual servitude, to be slaves and captives."

Regarding the essentials, the two versions have the same structure and expose the same ideas. The first part describes the reasons why the monarchs – or the king in the case of the Aragonese version – decided to expel the Jews. The second part details how the expulsion would take place.

=== The conditions of expulsion ===
The second part of the decree detailed the conditions for expulsion:

1. The expulsion of the Jews was final: "We agree to send out all male and female Jews from our kingdoms and [order] that none of them ever come back or return to them."
2. There was no exception, neither for age, residence, nor place of birth – it included both those born in the crowns of Castile and Aragon and those from elsewhere.
3. There was a period of four months, which would be extended ten more days, until August 10, to leave the monarchs' domains. Those who did not do so within that period, or who returned, would be punished with the death penalty and the confiscation of their property. Likewise, those who aided or concealed the Jews were liable to lose "all their goods, vassals, and fortresses, and other inheritances."
4. Within the set period of four months the Jews could sell their real estate and take the proceeds of the sale in the form of bills of exchange – not in coinage or gold and silver because their export was prohibited by law – or merchandise, as long as they were not arms or horses, whose export was also prohibited.

Although the edict did not refer to a possible conversion, this alternative was implicit. As the historian Luis Suárez pointed out, the Jews had "four months to take the most terrible decision of their lives: to abandon their faith to be integrated in it [in the kingdom, in the political and civil community], or leave the territory in order to preserve it."

The drama that the Jews lived is documented by a contemporary source:

Some Jews, when the term was running out, went about by night and day in despair. Many turned from the road ... and received the faith of Christ. Many others, in order not to deprive themselves of the country where they were born and not to sell their goods at that time at lower prices, were baptized.

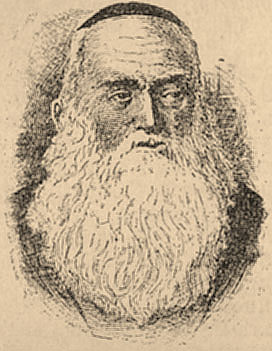
Isaac Abravanel.

The most outstanding Jews, with few exceptions such as that of Isaac Abravanel, decided to convert to Christianity. The most relevant case was that of Abraham Senior, the chief rabbi of Castile and one of the closest collaborators of the monarchs. He and all his relatives were baptized on June 15, 1492, in the Guadalupe monastery, with the monarchs Isabel and Ferdinand as their godparents. He took the name of Fernán Núñez Coronel, while his son-in-law Mayr Melamed took the name Fernán Pérez Coronel – in both cases, the same Christian name as the king. This case, like that of Abraham de Córdoba, was given much publicity, to serve as an example for the rest of their community. In fact, during the four-month tacit term that was given for the conversion, many Jews were baptized, especially the rich and the most educated, and among them the vast majority of the rabbis.

A chronicler of the time relates the intense propaganda campaign that unfolded:

To all their aljamas and communities much preaching was done, in all the synagogues and in the squares and in the churches and in the fields, by the wise men of Spain; and the holy gospel and the doctrine of the Holy Mother Church was preached to them, and it was preached and proven by their own Scriptures, how the Messiah they awaited was Our Redeemer and Savior Jesus Christ, who came at the suitable time, who their ancestors ignored with malice, and all the others who came after them never wanted to hear the truth; before, deceived by the false book of the Talmud, having the truth before their eyes and reading it in their law every day, they ignored and disregarded it.

The Jews who decided not to convert "had to prepare themselves for the departure in tremendous conditions." They had to sell their goods because they had very little time and had to accept the sometimes ridiculous amounts offered to them in the form of goods that could be carried away, since the export of gold and silver from the kingdom was prohibited. The possibility of taking bills of exchange was not much help because the bankers, Italians for the most part, demanded enormous interest. A chronicler of the time attests:

They sold and bargained away everything they could of their estates ... and in everything there were sinister ventures, and the Christians got their estates, very many and very rich houses and inheritances, for few monies; and they went about begging with them, and found not one to buy them, and gave a house for an ass and a vine for a little cloth or linen because they could not bring forth gold or silver.

They also had serious difficulties in recovering money lent to Christians because either the repayment term was after August 10, the deadline for their departure, or many of the debtors claimed "usury fraud," knowing that the Jews would not have time for the courts to rule in their favor. In a letter to the monarchs, the Ampudia Jews complained that, "The mayors of the said village were committing and have committed many wrongdoings and affronts that were specifically not consented to, no less do they want to pay their personal property and real estate that they have, nor pay the debts owed to them and that which they owe urge them to do and then pay them even if the deadlines are not reached."

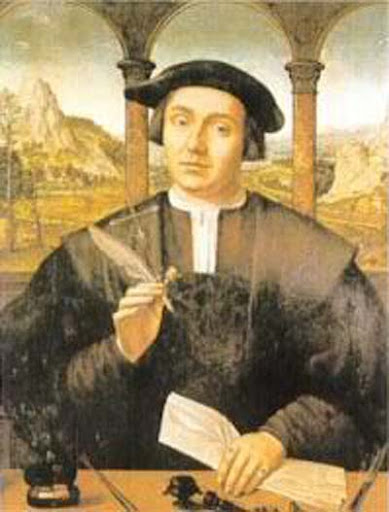
Luis de Santángel, a Valencian convert who collaborated with Isaac Abarbanel in the organization of the journey of the expelled Jews.

In addition, they had to pay all the expenses of the trip – transport, maintenance, freight of the ships, tolls, etc. This was organized by Isaac Abravanel, who contracted the ships (having to pay very high prices), and whose owners in some cases did not fulfill the contract or killed the travelers to steal what little they had. Abravanel counted on the collaboration of the royal official and convert Luis de Santángel and of the Genovese banker Francisco Pinelo.

The monarchs had to give orders to protect Jews during the trip because they suffered vexations and abuse. This is how Andrés Bernaldez, pastor of Los Palacios, describes the time when the Jews had to "abandon the lands of their birth":

All the young men and daughters who were twelve years old were married to each other, for all the females of this age above were in the shadow and company of husbands... They came out of the lands of their birth, big and small children, old and young, on foot and men on asses and other beasts, and on wagons, and continued their journeys each to the ports where they were to go; and went by the roads and fields where they went with many works and fortunes; some falling, others rising, others dying, others being born, others becoming sick, that there was no Christian that did not feel their pain, and always invited them to baptism, and some, with grief, converted and remained, but very few, and the rabbis worked them up and made the women and young men sing and play tambourines.

=== Reasons for the expulsion ===
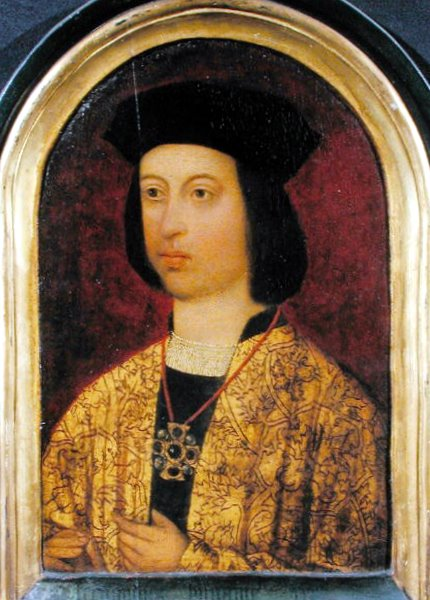
Ferdinand II of Aragon.

In the Castilian version of the Alhambra Decree, reference is made exclusively to religious motives. The Aragonese version also alludes to usury. The Jews are accused of heretical depravity, that is, of serving as an example and inciting the convert to return to the practices of his ancient religion. At the beginning of the decree, it is said that:

It is well known that in our dominions, there are some bad Christians who have Judaized and committed apostasy against the holy Catholic faith, the majority being caused by relations between Jews and Christians.

The measures taken up to that point by the monarchs to put an end to communication between the Jewish community and the converts, a fundamental cause of the new Christians "Judaizing," according to the monarchs and the Inquisition, are as follows. The first was the agreement of the Cortes of Toledo of 1480, by which the Jews were forced to live in separate neighborhoods from the Christians, to prevent the Jews from being able to "subvert and subtract the Christian faithful from our holy Catholic faith." The second was the decision to expel the Jews from Andalusia, "believing that this would be enough for those of the other cities and towns and places of our kingdoms and manors to stop doing and committing the aforementioned." But this measure failed "because every day it is found and it seems that the said Jews continue to grow their evil and damaged purpose where they live and converse."

Finally, the reason for deciding to expel the entire Jewish community, and not just those of its members who allegedly wanted to "pervert" the Christians, is explained:

Because when some serious and detestable crime is committed by some college or university [i.e. some corporation and community], it is reason that such college or university be dissolved, and annihilated and the younger ones by the elders and for each other to be punished and that those who pervert the good and honest living of cities and towns by a contagion, that can harm others, be expelled.

As highlighted Julio Valdeón, "undoubtedly the expulsion of the Jews from the Iberian site is one of the most controversial issues of all that have happened throughout the history of Spain." It is not surprising, therefore, that historians have debated whether, in addition to the motives laid out by the Catholic Monarchs in the decree, there were others. Nowadays, some of the arguments made over time, such as that the Jews were expelled to keep their wealth, seem to have been discarded, since the majority of the Jews who left were the most modest, while the richest converted and they stayed. And on the other hand, the crown did not benefit at all from the operation; rather, it was damaged, because it stopped receiving the taxes paid by the Jews. Nor does the argument seem to hold that the expulsion was an episode of class conflict – for instance, that the nobility wanted to get rid of an incipient bourgeoisie, represented by the Jews, that supposedly threatened their interests – because many Jews were defended by some of the most important noble families of Castile, and because in addition, it was among the ranks of the "bourgeoisie" of "old Christians" where anti-Judaism grew the most.

A personal motive on the part of the monarchs can also be ruled out, as there is no indication that they felt any repugnance towards Jews and converts. Among the monarchs' trusted men were several who belonged to this group, such as the confessor of the queen friar Hernando de Talavera, the steward Andrés Cabrera, the treasurer of the Santa Hermandad Abraham Senior, or Mayr Melamed and Isaac Abarbanel, without counting the Jewish doctors that attended them.

Expulsion of European Jewish communities between 1100 and 1600. The main routes that the Spanish Jews followed are marked in light brown.

Current historians prefer to place expulsion in the European context, and those such as Luis Suárez Fernández or Julio Valdeón highlight that the Catholic Monarchs were, in fact, the last of the sovereigns of the great western European states to decree expulsion – the Kingdom of England did it in 1290, the Kingdom of France in 1394; in 1421 the Jews were expelled from Vienna; in 1424 from Linz and of Colonia; in 1439 from Augsburg; in 1442 from Bavaria; in 1485 from Perugia; in 1486 from Vicenza; in 1488 from Parma; in 1489 from Milan and Luca; in 1493 from Sicily; in 1494 from Florence; in 1498 from Provence...-. The objective of all of them was to achieve unity of faith in their states, a principle that would be defined in the 16th century with the maxim "cuius regio, eius religio," i.e., that the subjects should profess the same religion as their prince.

As Joseph Pérez has pointed out, the expulsion "puts an end to an original situation in Christian Europe: that of a nation that consents to the presence of different religious communities" with which it "becomes a nation like the rest in European Christendom." Pérez adds, "The University of Paris congratulated Spain for having carried out an act of good governance, an opinion shared by the best minds of the time (Machiavelli, Guicciardini, Pico della Mirandola)... [...] it was the so-called medieval coexistence that was strange to Christian Europe."

Julio Valdeón affirms that the decision of the Catholic Monarchs, who "showed themselves, in their first years of rule, clearly protective of the Hebrews," was due to "pressure from the rest of Christianity" and to "the constant pressure of The Church, who often preached against those it called "deicides," as well as the "tremendous animosity that existed in the Christian people against the Jewish community." In this sense, he quotes the thesis of the Israeli historian Benzion Netanyahu that the expulsion was the consequence of the climate of racism that lived in the Christian society of the time. A thesis of the latter – that the monarchs decided on the expulsion to ingratiate themselves with the masses in which anti-Jewish sentiments predominated – Joseph Pérez considers to be without foundation: "Why should the monarchs have had to worry about what the masses felt about Jews and converts when they did not [even] attend to the more concrete interests of those masses? Of the three surviving versions of the expulsion edict, only the third [the Aragonese], which was signed only by King Ferdinand, refers to the subject of usury, and certainly in very harsh terms. In the other two versions, we do not read a single mention or even the slightest allusion to this matter. Accusations that had been repeated for centuries against the Jews: a deicide people, desecration of hosts, ritual crimes ... do not appear in any of the three versions."

For Joseph Pérez, the decision of the Catholic Monarchs, as evidenced by the content of the Granada Edict, is directly related to the "converso problem." The first step was the creation of the Inquisition, the second the expulsion of the Jews to eliminate those who allegedly incited the converts to Judaize. "What concerned them [the monarchs] was the total and definitive assimilation of the converts, for which the previous measures failed; they resort to a drastic solution: the expulsion of the Jews to root out evil." "The idea of expelling the Jews comes from the Inquisition; there is no doubt about this. [...] The expulsion of the Jews seemed to the Inquisition the best way to end the Judaizing of converts: by removing the cause – communication with Jews – the effect would fade away. […] The Catholic Monarchs take the idea on their own, but this does not mean that they are under pressure from the inquisitors. The concerns, for them, are also religious: heresy is not to their liking; they want to cleanse the kingdom of it, as the queen wrote, but these concerns are also political: they hope that the elimination of Judaism will facilitate the definitive assimilation and integration of the converts into Spanish society. ".

On the other hand, Joseph Pérez, following Luis Suárez, places the expulsion within the context of the construction of the "modern State," which requires greater social cohesion based on the unity of faith to impose its authority on all groups and individuals in the kingdom. Unlike in medieval times, in this type of state there are no groups that are governed by particular rules, as was the case for the Jewish community. For this reason, it is not by chance, Pérez warns, that only three months after having eliminated the last Muslim stronghold on the peninsula with the conquest of the Nasrid kingdom of Granada, the monarchs decreed the expulsion of the Jews. "What was intended then was to fully assimilate Judaizers and Jews so that there were only Christians. The monarchs must have thought that the prospect of expulsion would encourage Jews to convert en masse and that thus a gradual assimilation would destroy the remnants of Judaism. They were wrong about this. The vast majority preferred to leave, with all that this entailed in tears, sacrifices and humiliations, and remain faithful to their faith. They flatly refused the assimilation that was offered them as an alternative." However, "assimilation" is in this quote a euphemism: what was offered to the Sephardic Jew was, in fact, conversion to a faith that was not his own, hence his mass emigration (towards the different directions indicated in the map above).

== Consequences ==
=== The end of religious diversity in Spain ===
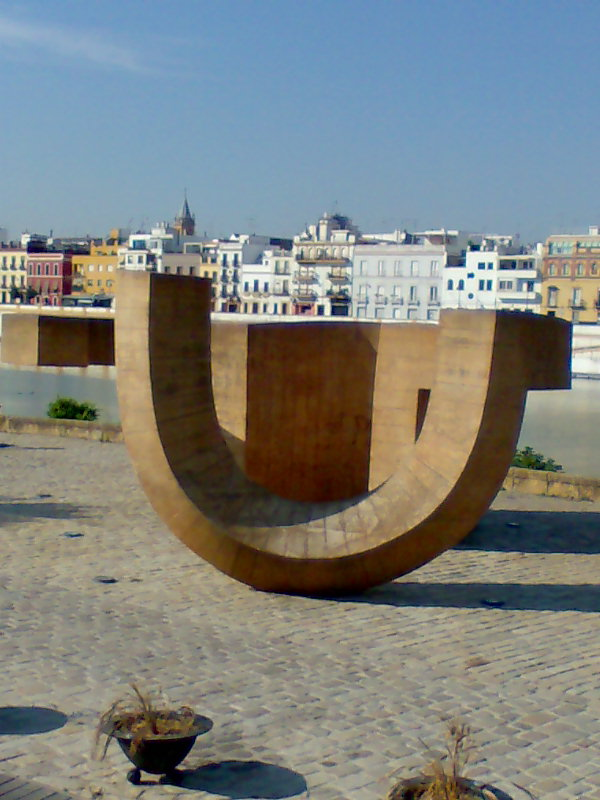
Monument to Tolerance in Seville, located in the place where five Jews were burned alive.

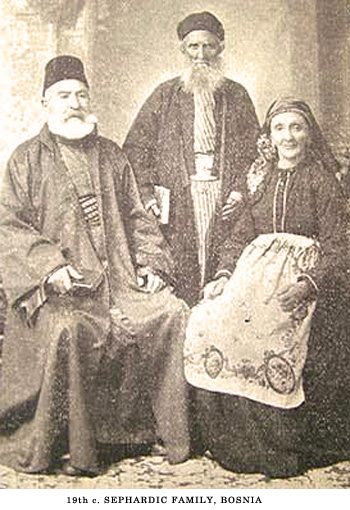
Sephardic family of Ottoman Bosnia (19th century).

As Joseph Pérez has pointed out, "In 1492, the story of Spanish Judaism ends, thenceforth leading only an underground existence, always threatened by the Spanish Inquisition and the suspicion of a public opinion that saw in Jews, Judaizers and even sincere converts natural enemies of Catholicism and Spanish idiosyncrasy, as understood and imposed by some ecclesiastical and intellectual leaders, in an attitude that bordered on racism."

Historic accounts of the numbers of Jews who left Spain are based on speculation, and some aspects were exaggerated by early accounts and historians: Juan de Mariana speaks of 800,000 people, and Don Isaac Abravanel of 300,000. While few reliable statistics exist for the expulsion, modern estimates by scholars from the University of Barcelona estimated the number of Sephardic Jews during the 15th century at 400,000 out of a total population of approximately 7.5 million people in all of Spain, out of whom about half (at least 200,000) or slightly more (300,000) remained in Iberia as conversos; Others who tried to estimate the Jews' demographics based on tax returns and population estimates of communities are much lower, with Kamen stating that, of a population of approximately 80,000 Jews and 200,000 conversos, about 40,000 emigrated. Another approximately 50,000 Jews received a Christian baptism so as to remain in Spain; many secretly kept some of their Jewish traditions and thus became the target of the Inquisition. The Jews of the kingdom of Castile emigrated mainly to Portugal (where the entire community was forcibly converted in 1497) and to North Africa. The Jews of the kingdom of Aragon fled to other Christian areas including Italy, rather than to Muslim lands as is often assumed. Although the vast majority of conversos simply assimilated into the Catholic dominant culture, a minority continued to practice Judaism in secret, gradually migrating throughout Europe, North Africa, and the Ottoman Empire, mainly to areas where Sephardic communities were already present as a result of the Alhambra Decree.

The situation of those who returned was regularized with an order of November 10, 1492, in which it was established that civil and ecclesiastical authorities had to be witnesses to baptism, and in the event that they had been baptized before returning, evidence and testimonials that confirm it. They were also able to recover all their goods for the same price at which they had sold them. Returns are documented at least until 1499. On the other hand, the Provision of the Royal Council of 24 October 1493 set harsh sanctions for those who slandered these New Christians with insulting terms such as tornadizos ("transgressors").

As for the economic impact of the expulsion, it seems to be ruled out that it was a hard setback that stopped the birth of capitalism, which would be one of the causes of the decline of Spain. As Joseph Pérez has pointed out, "in view of the published literature on taxation and economic activities, there is no doubt that the Jews were no longer a source of relevant wealth, neither as bankers nor as renters nor as merchants who conducted business at an international level. [...] The expulsion of the Jews produced problems at the local level but not a national catastrophe. It is unreasonable to attribute to that event the decline of Spain and its supposed inability to adapt to the transformations of the modern world. What we know now shows that 16th century Spain was not exactly an economically backward nation. [....] In strictly demographic and economic terms, and apart from human aspects, the expulsion did not imply for Spain any substantial deterioration, but only a temporary crisis quickly overcome."

An issue of the Amsterdam Gazette published in the Netherlands on September 12, 1672, and preserved at Beth Hatefutsoth evidences interest by the Jewish community in what was happening at that time in Madrid, and it presents the news in Spanish, 180 years after the expulsion.

=== Continued persecution of crypto-Jews ===
After the expulsion, the Spanish Inquisition remained active for centuries and continued into the 18th century, targeting conversos suspected of 'Judaizing,' that is, secretly observing Jewish beliefs and practices. As the Church could not legally execute, it transferred convicted individuals to secular authorities, who implemented sentences such as death by burning—a punishment developed within ecclesiastical circles and justified as saving the soul through earthly suffering. Public executions, called autos-de-fé, became elaborate ceremonies featuring processions, sermons, and mass spectacle, sometimes even attended by royalty. Those who confessed under pressure were paraded in humiliating garments called sanbenitos, with their offenses read aloud and their names displayed in churches for generations. Others were burned in effigy if they had died or fled, and even the remains of deceased suspects were exhumed and destroyed as part of the symbolic enforcement of orthodoxy.

=== The Sephardic diaspora and the Jewish identity continuity ===
The expulsion initiated a prolonged period of exile and hardship, triggering a refugee crisis as Jews sought new places of refuge and resettlement. Most of the expelled Jews settled in North Africa, sometimes via Portugal, or in nearby states, such as the Kingdom of Portugal, the Kingdom of Navarre, or in the Italian states. As they were also expelled from these first two kingdoms in 1497 and 1498 respectively, they were forced to emigrate again. The majority of those from Navarre settled in Bayonne. And those from Portugal ended up in Northern Europe (England or Flanders). In North Africa, those who went to the Fez kingdom suffered all kinds of ill-treatment and were plundered, even by the Jews who had lived there for a long time. Those who fared the best were those who settled in the territories of the Ottoman Empire, both in North Africa and in the Middle East, such as in the Balkans and the Republic of Ragusa, after having passed by Italy. Sultan Bayezid II gave orders to welcome them, and exclaimed on one occasion, referring to King Ferdinand: "You call him king who impoverishes his states to enrich mine?" This same sultan commented to the ambassador sent by Carlos V who marveled that "the Jews had been thrown out of Castile, which was to throw away wealth." Over the course of a few generations, the Ottoman Empire's cities emerged as the heart of the Sephardic world.

One result of the migration was new Jewish surnames appearing in Italy and Greece. The surnames Faraggi, Farag and Farachi, for example, originated from the Spanish city of Fraga.

As some Jews identified Spain and the Iberian Peninsula with the biblical Sepharad, the Jews expelled by the Catholic monarchs took or received the name of Sephardi. Contemporary Jewish accounts frequently compared their suffering to that of the ancient Israelites, expressing both their trust in God and their hope for messianic deliverance. In addition to their religion, they also "kept many of their ancestral customs, and in particular preserved the use of the Spanish language, a language which, of course, is not exactly what was spoken in fifteenth-century Spain: like any living language, it evolved and suffered notable alterations over the passage of time, although the structures and essential characteristics remained those of late medieval Castilian. [...] The Sephardis never forgot the land of their parents, harboring mixed feelings for her: on the one hand, the resentment for the tragic events of 1492, and on the other hand, as time goes by, the nostalgia for the lost homeland."

Regarding Judeo-Spanish (also known as Ladino) as a socio-cultural and identity phenomenon, Garcia-Pelayo and Gross wrote in 1977:

It is said of the Jews expelled from Spain in the 15th century that they preserve the language and the Spanish traditions in the East. The expulsion of the Jews [...] sent a large number of families out of the Iberian Peninsula, mainly from Andalusia and Castile, to settle in the eastern Mediterranean countries dominated by the Turks, where they formed colonies which have survived to this day, especially in Egypt, Algeria, Morocco, Turkey, Greece, Bulgaria [...]. These families, generally composed of Sephardic elements of good social standing, have maintained their religion, traditions, language, and even their own literature for four-and-a-half centuries. The Spanish that they transported, that of Castile and Andalusia from the end of the 15th century, removed from all contact with that of the Peninsula, has not participated in the evolution undergone by that of Spain and Spanish colonial America. Its phonetics present some archaic but not degenerate forms; Its vocabulary offers countless loan words from Hebrew, Greek, Italian, Arabic, Turkish, according to the countries of residence.

== Sources ==
- Fernández-Morera, Darío (2016). The Myth of the Andalusian Paradise: Muslims, Christians, and Jews under Islamic Rule in Medieval Spain. Wilmington: ISI Books. ISBN 978-1-5040-3469-2.
- Gerber, Jane (1994). The Jews of Spain: A History of the Sephardic Experience. New York: The Free Press. ISBN 978-0029115749.
- Kamen, Henry (1998). The Spanish Inquisition: a Historical Revision. Yale University Press. ISBN 978-0-300-07522-9.
- Kamen, Henry (2011). La Inquisición Española. Una revisión histórica (in Spanish) (3rd ed.). Barcelona: Crítica. ISBN 978-84-9892-198-4.
- Pérez, Joseph (2007). History of a Tragedy: The Expulsion of the Jews from Spain. Translated by Hochroth, Lysa. University of Illinois Press. ISBN 9780252031410.
- Pérez, Joseph (2009) [2005]. Los judíos en España [The Jews in Spain] (in Spanish). Madrid: Marcial Pons. ISBN 978-84-96467-03-3.
- Pérez, Joseph (2012) [2009]. Breve Historia de la Inquisición en España [A Brief History of the Inquisition in Spain] (in Spanish). Barcelona: Crítica. ISBN 978-84-08-00695-4.
- Pérez, Joseph (2013) [2007]. Historia de una tragedia. La expulsión de los judíos de España [A story of tragedy: The expulsion of the Jews from Spain] (in Spanish). Barcelona: Crítica. ISBN 978-84-08-05538-9.
- Roth, Norman (1995). Conversos, Inquisition, and the Expulsion of the Jews from Spain. Madison, Wisconsin: University of Wisconsin Press. ISBN 0-299-14230-2. OCLC 32132420.
- Suárez Fernández, Luis (2012). La expulsión de los judíos. Un problema europeo (in Spanish). Barcelona: Ariel. ISBN 978-84-344-0025-2.
- Valdeón Baruque, Julio (2007). "El reinado de los Reyes Católicos. Época crucial del antijudaísmo español" [The reign of the Catholic Monarchs. A crucial period in Spanish anti-Semitism]. In Álvarez Chillida, Gonzalo; Izquierdo Benito, Ricardo (eds.). El antisemitismo en España [Anti-Semitism in Spain] (in Spanish). Cuenca: University of Castilla-La Mancha. ISBN 978-84-8427-471-1.
