= Abraham Senior =

Crown rabbi of Castille, late-life convert to Christianity (1412–1493)

Don Abraham Seneor (later Fernando Pérez Coronel)

Crown rabbi of Castile

Personal details
- Born: c. 1412
- Died: 1493 (aged 80-81) Segovia, Spain
- Occupation: Rabbi, banker, politician
- Known for: Conversion to Christianity under royal patronage following the expulsion of Jews from Spain

Don Abraham Seneor or Abraham Senior (Segovia 1412–1493) was a Sephardi rabbi, banker, politician, patriarch of the Coronel family and last Crown rabbi of Castile, a senior member of the Castilian hacienda (almojarife of the Castile or royal administrator). In 1492, at the age of 80, he converted to Roman Catholicism from Judaism. Taking the name Ferrán, Fernán, or Fernando Pérez Coronel; thus founding the noble lineage of Coronel.

== The Seneor family ==
The Seneor family, from the 1460s, were the largest group engaged in tax farming for the Crown of Castile. The Seneor family was also involved in politics, defending the interests of artisans in the cities of central Castile. He was related to Andrés Cabrera (the steward of King Henry IV of Castile), Andrés Cabrera's wife, Beatriz de Bobadilla (lady of the Queen Isabella of Castile) and Alonso Quintanilla, Count of Accounts, to whom the Infante (crown prince) Alfonso had entrusted the establishment of a mint in Medina del Campo (a city enriched by the fairs). In 1488 Seneor became treasurer of the Holy Brotherhood (founded in 1476 and counting Quintanilla among its members).

== Isabella's courtier ==
His position at court was so important that it was not limited to his duties as the kingdom's most important tax farmer. In 1469 he played a major role in securing the marriage of the Infanta Isabella of Castile to Ferdinand of Aragon, including providing the betrothal gifts.

In 1473 he had a hand in the reconciliation between Isabella and her estranged brother Henry IV, and, in 1474, in providing the Alcázar of Segovia (whose warden was Andrés Cabrera) as a place for Isabella to hide following the death of her brother, the king. Isabella had such confidence in Seneor that, in gratitude for his services, she endowed him with a lifetime pension of 100,000 maravedis, confirmed in 1480 at the behest of the royal confessor Hernando de Talavera. Seneor was appointed chief justice of the Jewish community of Segovia, (often clashing with converted Jews and their families) 12 and rab do la corte (court Rabbi or chief rabbi of Castile); an office for which, like many of his predecessors, the Jewish religious authorities thought him unqualified. He was so respected by the Jewish grandees, however, that the Cortes of Toledo in 1480 presented him with 50,000 maravedis. He was a close friend of Isaac Abravanel, whom he worked with in tax collection. In the War of Granada Seneor and Abravanel played a valuable role both in raising taxes and provisioning Isabella's army, while Samuel Abolafia was in charge of recruitment. They also supported Columbus's efforts to secure Isabella's patronage for the proposed transatlantic expedition of Christopher Columbus.

Senior actively intervened in support of the cause of the Jewish community, which was coming under increasing pressure. Through their efforts, they managed to raise among the Castilian aljamas a large sum of money to allow the Jews captured in Málaga to be ransomed. After failing to prevent the decree expelling the Jews from Spain (the Edict of Granada issued (31 March 1492), despite their offer of a large sum of money, Seneor (an old man of 80 years), together with others of his family chose conversion to Catholicism, while his friend Abravanel (55) chose to keep his religion and left for Naples.

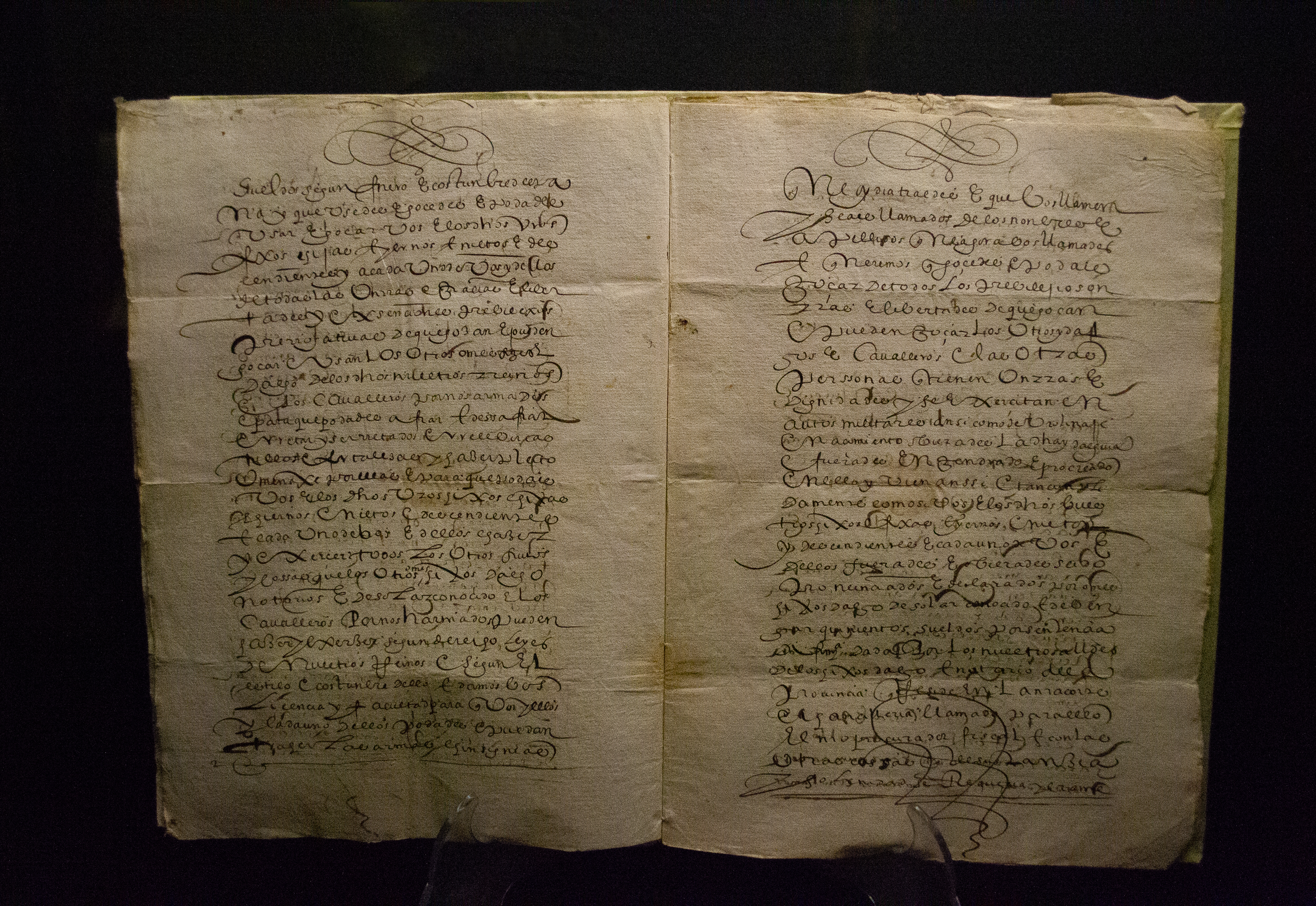
Charter granting privileges and nobility to Fernán Pérez Coronel (Abraham Senior).

The conversion of Abraham Seneor was expected to have a major impact on the political strategy of the Catholic Monarchs, so it was carefully staged, publicized and surrounded by all appropriate solemnities. In a ceremony held on June 15, 1492 in the monastery of Guadalupe and conducted by the Primate of All Spain, Seneor was baptized and took his Christian name, Fernando (after his godfather, King Ferdinand himself), and the surname Perez Coronel (chosen from the extinct noble lineage Coronel).

Within a few days of his conversion, whose sincerity was discussed, he became a ruler of Segovia, a member of the Royal Council and chief accountant of Prince Juan. During the expulsion Seneor continued to play a key financial role in assisting others in the Jewish community forced to leave Spain.

== The Coronel family ==
The Coronel family remained one of the most important families of Segovia in the sixteenth century. In 1493, the children of Abraham/Fernando, Juan Perez Coronel and Inigo Lopez Coronel, inherited his position in the business partnership with Luis de Alcalá and brother-in-law Mayr Melamed/Fernan Núñez Coronel. Inigo was also ruler of Segovia, and the lifting of the Communities was treasurer of the rebels. Abraham's daughter, Maria Coronel, had married in 1510 Juan Bravo, a future leader of the rebel Comuneros in the Castilian.

A Pedro Fernandez Coronel, probably the son of Fernan Nunez Coronel, participated in the second voyage of Columbus, (who spoke of him in glowing terms,) and was appointed Constable of the Indies (with a salary of 15,000 maravedis a year). Back in Spain, he acted as a godfather at the baptism ceremony of the first Native American Indian, giving him the name of Peter (July 29, 1496, in the same monastery of Guadalupe where he was baptized a few years before).

Abraham Seneor's house in Segovia, in the Jewish quarter or neighborhood of the Coronel, became a Franciscan convent in 1902, and currently houses the Educational Centre of the Jewish quarter. The Monastery of Santa María del Parral still houses the chapel of Calvary of the Coronel family, and contains the tombs of Abraham/Fernando, his brother Paul Coronel (secretary of Cardinal Cisneros and professor of Hebrew at the University of Alcala, where he spoke at the Complutense Polyglot) and his granddaughter, Maria Coronel. Other prominent members of the family were Luis Nunez Coronel (nephew of Abraham, theologian, professor at the Sorbonne, Secretary of Alonso de Fonseca and friend of Erasmus of Rotterdam) and Paul Nunez Coronel (Sorbonne professor and rector of Montague College, where he met Erasmus). The outstanding physician Andrés Laguna was a neighbor of the Coronel family.

Not all the descendants of Rabbi Abraham Senior, also known as Fernán Pérez Coronel, truly embraced Catholicism. Some were denounced as New Christian judaizers (secret Jews) and, punished by the Inquisition, lost their possessions and even were deported to Brazil. Other descendants fled to lands more tolerant to Jews, such as Duarte Saraiva (born 1572), who escaped to Holland, where he adopted the name David Senior Coronel and subsequently went to Brazil, where he was considered the richest man in Dutch Brazil. Rabbi Menasseh Ben Israel (1604–57) dedicated his book, Conciliador, to Perez Coronel. Pérez Coronel descendants are scattered around the world, some in Israel, others in Brazil, Ecuador, Mexico, Venezuela, Holland, and the United States.

== Notable descendants ==
- Benjamin Cardozo, American lawyer and jurist who served as an Associate Justice of the Supreme Court of the United States.
- David Senior Coronel, Dutch colonial businessman and founder of the Jewish community in Recife, Brazil.
- Fernando Coronel, Ecuadorian contractor who helped BP drill Ecuador's first oil well "Ancon 1".
- Gabriel Coronel, Venezuelan theater and TV actor, singer, and model.
- María Josefa Coronel, Ecuadorian journalist.
- Tim Coronel, Dutch auto racing driver and twin brother of Tom.
- Tom Coronel, Dutch auto racing driver and twin brother of Tim.
- Uri Coronel, Dutch sports director (AFC Ajax).
- Nassau Senior, author of the British Poor Law Amendment Act 1834.
- Nachman Nathan Coronel, a 19th century Dutch/Jerusalemite Jewish scholar.
- Jaap Nunes Vaz, Dutch journalist and editor for the underground newspaper Het Parool in WWII.
- Candido Pinheiro Coren de Lima, Brazilian writer
- Paulo Leão, Brazilian actor, filmmaker and musician
- Christina Coronel, singer, songwriter and musician

== Bibliography ==
- Villagrán, Enrique de Diego (2002). El último rabino: Abraham Seneor, el amigo de Isabel la Católica (in Spanish). Aneto Publicaciones. ISBN 978-84-95349-13-2.
