= Ben Shimon =

Ben Shimon (Hebrew: בן שמעון) or Ben-Shimon (Hebrew: בן-שמעון), is a Hebrew language patronymic and surname literally meaning "son of Shimon". Notable people with the name include:

- David ben Shimon (1826–1879), Moroccan rabbi
- Ran Ben-Shimon (born 1970), Israeli footballer and manager
- Ran Ben Shimon (footballer, born 1990), Israeli footballer
- Roey Ben Shimon (born 2000), Israeli footballer
- Eleazar ben Simeon (fl. 2nd century), rabbi
- Joel ben Simeon (fl. 15th century), illustrator
- Uri ben Simeon (fl. 16th century), Swiss writer

== See also ==
- Ben Simon (disambiguation)
- Joseph ben Judah ben Shimeon or Joseph ben Judah of Ceuta, Medieval Jewish physician and poet
