= Aljama =

Iberian Moorish and Jewish communities

Aljama (Spanish: [alˈxama], Portuguese: [alˈʒɐmɐ], Catalan: [əʎˈʒamə]) is a term of Arabic origin used in old official documents in Spain and Portugal to designate the self-governing communities of Moors and Jews living under Christian rule in the Iberian Peninsula. In some present-day Spanish cities, the name is still applied to the quarters where such communities lived, though they are many centuries gone.

The Jewish communities of Spain, owing to their social isolation and to the religious and political regulations imposed upon them, had always formed groups apart from the rest of the population. The authority exercised by their own rabbis and the system of tax-collection by the heads of the congregations for the administration of communal affairs, placed them almost completely without the jurisdiction of the government of the country. As a result, they soon came to be dealt with by the officials not as subjects amenable to the general law of the land, but as collective bodies with special privileges and special duties.

Thus, the Visigothic kings imposed a tax not upon each individual Jew or upon the heads of families, but upon the community as a whole, allowing the communal authorities to fix the individual rate of taxation. But both under the Visigoths and under the Moors there was neither regularity in the transactions of the rabbis and elders nor system in the attitude of the government toward the Jewish communities. With the reestablishment of Christian rule, however, the relation between the government and its Jewish subjects gradually became a well-defined one.

In 1219 and 1284 in Toledo, in 1273 in Barcelona, in 1290 at Huete, and on more than one occasion during those years in Portugal, councils were held of Spanish officials and Jewish representatives for the purpose of establishing a just rate of taxation for Jewish communities, and of devising adequate means for tax-collection. This first official recognition by the government of the Jewish communities as separate bodies led to a still further change in the treatment of the Jewish congregations and in the legislation, both local and national, regarding them.

The bishops of the various districts assumed immediate authority over them, and, in conjunction with Jewish representatives, formed rules which were henceforth to govern the communities. The elections of rabbis and judges were to be held at stated intervals, and the names of these dignitaries submitted to the bishop for approval; there was to be a Rabino mayor (Rab de la corte; lit. 'court rabbi') for the presentation of communal questions before the proper authorities; and the heads of the congregation were made answerable for the conduct of the community. In all government action, whether local or general, the unit considered was in most cases the community, not the individual Jew.

The governing authority of the state sometimes nominated a member of the Jewish community to the administrative position of crown rabbi to act as intermediary between the aljama and the state. For example in the Kingdom of Aragon, King John I issued edicts in 1386 defining the functions and duties of the Rab Mayor. There were various requirements as to the good character and faith of the person holding the position, as well as a requirement that he live among the entourage of the Court, and thus away from his community, and in constant contact with the Christian majority population. His powers and authorities over the aljama of Castile, economic, judicial, and otherwise, were specified.

== Etymology and development of the concept ==
The word aljama comes from Arabic and refers to the congregational mosque of a Muslim community, where believers gather to pray jumu'ah, the communal Friday prayer.

The word aljama is derived from Arabic: جامعة, romanized: jāmiʿa, lit. 'gathering' plus the definite article al. Jāmiʿa originally meant 'congregation,' 'assembly,' or 'group,' but was, even before the establishment of Spanish rule, applied by the Moors to their religious bodies and larger mosques, and especially to the Jewish communities in the midst of them, and to the synagogues and schools which formed the center of all Jewish life. The Christians adopted the term, extending its meaning to designate the Jewish and Muslim quarters. In some Spanish cities, former Jewish quarters are still known by that name, even though the Jews were expelled in 1492.

Very often, for purposes of distinction, such phrases as Aljama de los Judíos 'Aljama of the Jews' and Aljama de los Moros 'Aljama of the Moors' were used. But the circumstance that the Moors of Spain had by the term designated more especially the Jewish community has left its trace in the use of the word in Spanish; for in Spanish literature aljama, without any further specification, stands for sanedrín or Judería (Jewish quarter), or even for Jewish places of worship, in the concrete as well as abstract sense. This use occurs at a very early date. In the "Poem of Alexander", the "Milagros de Nuestra Señora," and the "Duelo de la Virgen" of Gonzalo de Berceo, all of the 13th century, aljama or alfama is employed to designate the people of ancient Jerusalem; and the historian of the 16th century, Mariana, uses aljama for the synagogue: "they devastated their houses and their aljamas."

== Tecana of Valladolid ==
A good example of how much self-government was granted to the Jewish Aljamas is afforded by the "resolution of the meeting", in Spanish called tecana (from takkanah (תקנה), a Hebrew word that, like sanedrín, has been incorporated into Spanish) arrived at by the Aljama of Valladolid in 1432. The report is written partly in Hebrew and partly in Spanish in the Hebrew alphabet and is preserved in the Bibliothèque Nationale de France at Paris ("Fonds hébreux," No. 585).

From this document, it is learned that, at Valladolid, electoral meetings were held by the community every ten years and that the particular meeting of which an account is given in the document took place in the latter part of Iyar (end of May) and lasted for ten days. The following were some of the matters decided or discussed:

1. The necessity of the Talmud Torah, or Hebrew school, and the rate of taxation for the maintenance of the same, which was decided upon as follows: five maravedís for each of the cattle killed, and one for each sheep; five maravedis for every flask of wine. Five maravedis were also to be paid by a married couple on their wedding day and by a boy on the day of his bar mitzvah. A tax was also laid upon inheritances, and various other means of revenue were devised. In connection with this question the employment and salary of private or itinerant teachers were discussed.
2. The election of the judges and the rabbi of the court, to which much space is accorded in the tecana.
3. The attitude of the individual Jew in his relations with the state. This was by far the most critical question discussed. Since permission to decide civil and criminal cases before the government had been granted to Jewish judges, and since "the Christians, though they be well versed in law, know nothing of Jewish laws," no Jew might plead before a Christian judge, whether religious or civil, except in cases where the taxes and imposts due to the ruler were in litigation, or where special permission was obtained from the dayan, or chief judge of the Aljama. A Jew who arrested another Jew with the aid of a Christian was to be apprehended by the dayan; for a second offense of the same nature, he was to be branded on the forehead and expelled. A third offense was punishable by death.

The ability to impose capital punishment indicates how broad the Jewish community's autonomy was.

== Derived words ==
From aljama are derived:

- Aljamado, adjective and noun, the inhabitant of an aljama
- Aljamía, the Spanish vernacular used by the Jews or Moors, but more specifically the Spanish or Mozarabic language written with Hebrew characters by the Jews, and with Arabic letters by the Moors
- Aljamiado, adjective and noun, one who speaks or knows the aljamía.

== Similar unrelated words ==
- Spanish Alhama and Portuguese Alfama derive from Arabic hammam (lit. 'baths').
- Arabic ra's al-galut meaning exilarch.
