= Joshua Boaz ben Simon Baruch =

Spanish rabbi

Joshua Boaz ben Simon Baruch (died 1557), also known as the Shiltei Giborim after a work he authored, was a prominent Talmudist who lived at Sabbioneta, and later at Savigliano. He was a descendant of an old Judæo-Spanish family, and probably settled in Italy after the banishment of the Jews from Spain.

When he was twenty-three years old, he began to publish useful works on the Talmud, in which he displayed vast erudition.

== Rulings ==
Among his rulings in Jewish Law is the consent for women to wear wigs. He argued that hairs which are not attached to the head are not subject to the prohibitions regarding modesty which requires the covering of a woman's hair.

== Works ==
- Massoret haShas or Massoret haTalmud, (trans. "Tradition of the Talmud"), marginal notes to the Talmud giving cross-references to parallel passages in the Talmud and the halakhic Midrashim
- Ein Mishpat, Ner Mitzvah, (trans. "The Wellspring of Justice, the Lamp of the Precept"), further marginal notes, giving references to the relevant Halakhot in Maimonides' Yad ha-Chazakah, Moses of Coucy's Sefer Mitzvot Gadol and the Arba'ah Turim and Shulchan Aruch (as these last two works have the same numbering system, the same references are valid for both)
- Torah Ohr, (trans. "The Torah is Light"), an index of the Biblical passages mentioned in the Talmud. These three works were first published, together with the Talmud, at Venice, 1546–1551, and are still found in most Talmud editions
- Siddur Mordechai VeSimanav, a compendium of Mordechai ben Hillel's halakhic work arranged according to the order of the Yad ha-Chazakah. The same work was also published (Sabionetta, 1554) under the title Siddur Dinei Mordechai
- Shiltei ha-Gibborim, (trans. "Shields of Heroes"), a selection of critical notes on Alfasi's compendium of the Talmud, and on the Mordechai. This work bears also the title Sefer haMachloket.
