= Benjamin Simmons (politician) =

American politician

Benjamin Simmons was a state legislator in South Carolina. He represented Beaufort County, South Carolina in the South Carolina House of Representatives.

In 1868 he served as a page in the House of Representatives. He was elected in 1875.

In 1877 he gave sworn testimony that he did not know of any threats by Republicans to Democrats. He testified he voted at Rantowles Depot. He signed his statement with an X.

He was a farmer.
