= Nachman Nathan Coronel =

Jerusalemite Jewish scholar

- נחמן נתן קורונל
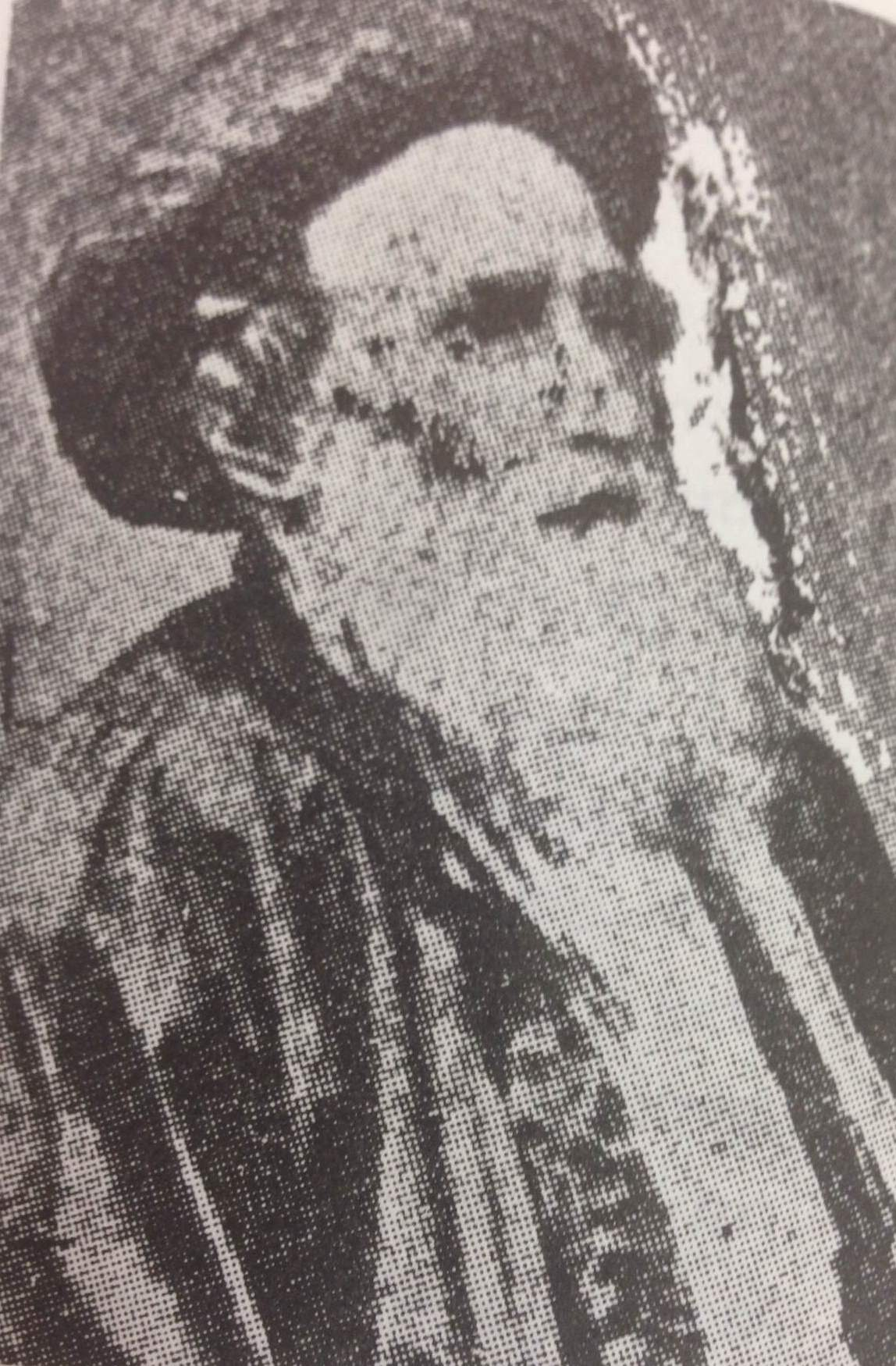

Personal life
- Born: 1810 Amsterdam, Holland
- Died: 6 August 1890 (aged 79–80) Jerusalem, Mutasarrifate of Jerusalem, Ottoman Empire
- Buried: Mount of Olives Jewish Cemetery

Religious life
- Religion: Judaism

Nachman Nathan Coronel (Hebrew: נחמן נתן קורונל, romanized: Naḥman Natan Koronel; 1810 – 6 August 1890) was a Jerusalemite Jewish scholar.

== Biography ==
Coronel was born in Amsterdam to a Sephardic father and Ashkenazic mother. His teacher was Rabbi Abraham Susan. In 1830 he emigrated to Safed, Ottoman Syria, where he married, afterward settling in Jerusalem. There he studied in the Sephardic yeshiva. He became especially interested in rabbinical manuscripts, and acquired many rare copies, some of which he sold to European libraries, while others he published with his own annotations.

Coronel was awarded by the Emperor of Austria the gold medal for art and science for his work in manuscripts.

== Publications ==
- Bet Natan [The House of Nathan]. Vienna. 1854. Containing a varied version of Berakhot, manuscripts of Cairo, and decisions by Isaiah di Trani the Elder, with an introduction by Coronel.
- Ḥamishshah Konterisim [Five Pamphlets]. Vienna. 1864. hdl:2027/hvd.32044088164140. Containing a varied version of Kallah, decisions in jurisprudence by Solomon Tazerat, and a letter of excommunication by David the Exilarch.
- Seder Rav Amram Gaon. Warsaw. 1865. hdl:2027/nnc1.cu58938583. Containing a liturgy of the geonic period.
- Teshuvot ha-Geonim [Responsa of Geonim]. Vienna. 1871. hdl:2027/mdp.39015069849233. Rules for the slaughter and examination of animals, by Rabbi Jonah.
- Zekher Natan [Memory of Nathan]. Vienna. 1872. hdl:2027/osu.32435052686177. Selected religious regulations for travelers.
- Piske Ḥalah. Jerusalem. 1876. hdl:2027/uc1.g0001598515. Decisions by Solomon ben Adret in reference to appropriating ḥallah (the priests' share of the dough), and decisions by Jacob ben Zahal of Jerusalem. Coronel, in his own essay, Ḥakor Davar [Search out a Matter], attempted to establish a precedent for the exemption, like the Levite tithe, of the appropriation of ḥallah outside the Holy Land, for which he was rebuked by the rabbis of Jerusalem.
- Alfasi Zuta [The [Abridged] Alfasi]. Jerusalem. 1885. By Menahem Azariah da Fano, with Coronel's commentary.
