= Isaac Abarbanel =

Portuguese Jewish statesman, philosopher, Bible commentator, & financier (1437–1508)

Don Isaac Abarbanel
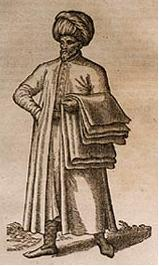
- 17th century depiction of Jewish merchant often used as a stand in for Abarbanel
- Born: Isaac ben Judah Abarbanel; 1437; Lisbon, Kingdom of Portugal
- Died: 1508 (aged 70–71); Venice, Republic of Venice

Philosophical work
- Era: Medieval philosophy
- Region: Jewish philosophy
- Main interests: Religious philosophy

Isaac ben Judah Abarbanel (Hebrew: יצחק בן יהודה אברבנאל; 1437–1508), commonly referred to as Abarbanel (Hebrew: אַבַּרבְּנְאֵל; also spelled Abravanel, Avravanel or Abrabanel), was a Portuguese Jewish statesman, philosopher, Bible commentator, and financier.

== Name ==
Some debate exists over whether his last name should be pronounced Abarbanel or Abravanel. The traditional pronunciation is Abarbanel. Modern scholarly literature, since Graetz and Baer, has most commonly used Abravanel, but his own son Judah insisted on Abarbanel, and Sefer HaTishbi by Elijah Levita, who was a nearby contemporary, twice vowels the name as Abarbinel (אַבַּרְבִּינֵאל).

The name's etymology is uncertain. Some say it comes from Ab Rabban El, meaning "father of the rabbis of God", which seems to favor the pronunciation "Abrabanel".

== Biography ==
Abarbanel was born in Lisbon, Portugal, into one of the oldest and most distinguished Iberian Jewish families, his antecedents having escaped the massacre in Castile in 1391. A student of the rabbi of Lisbon, Joseph Chaim, he became well versed in rabbinic literature and in the learning of his time, devoting his early years to the study of Jewish philosophy. Abarbanel is quoted as saying that he counted Joseph ibn Shem-Tov as his mentor. At 20 years old, he wrote on the original form of the natural elements, on religious questions and prophecy. Together with his intellectual abilities, he exhibited a mastery of financial matters. This attracted the attention of King Afonso V of Portugal, who employed him as treasurer.

He used his high position and the great wealth he had inherited from his father to aid his co-religionists. When his patron Afonso captured the city of Arzila, in Morocco, the Jewish captives faced being sold as slaves. Abarbanel both contributed large sums to the ransom and personally arranged for collections throughout Portugal. He also wrote to his learned and wealthy friend, Vitale (Yehiel) Nissim da Pisa, on behalf of the captives.

After the death of Afonso, he was obliged to relinquish his office, having been accused by King John II of connivance with the Duke of Braganza, who had been executed on the charge of conspiracy. Abarbanel, warned in time, saved himself by a hasty flight to Castile in 1483. His large fortune was confiscated by royal decree.

At Toledo, his new home, he occupied himself at first with Biblical studies, and in the course of six months produced an extensive commentary on the books of Joshua, Judges, and Samuel. Shortly afterward, though, he entered the service of the house of Castile. Together with his friend, the influential converso Don Abraham Senior, of Segovia, he undertook to farm the revenues and to supply provisions for the royal army, contracts that he carried out to the entire satisfaction of Queen Isabella I of Castile.

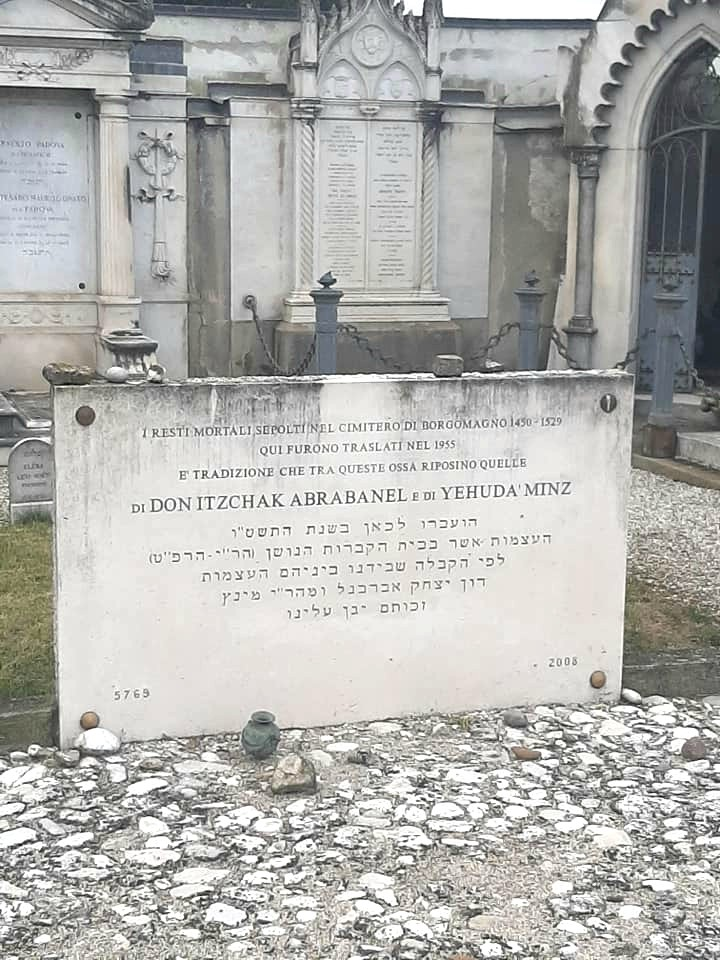
Gravemarker in Padua

During the Reconquista, Abarbanel advanced considerable sums of money to the king. When the Jews were ordered banished by the Catholic Monarchs of Spain with the Alhambra Decree, he did all in his power to induce the king to revoke the edict. He unsuccessfully offered the king 30,000 ducats (approximately £60,000 at the time). He left Spain with his fellow Jews and went to Naples, where, soon after, he entered the service of the king. For a short time, he lived in peace undisturbed, but when the city was taken by the French, bereft of all his possessions, he followed the young king, Alfonso, to Messina in 1495, before going to Corfu. In 1496, he settled in Monopoli, before finally landing in Venice in 1503, where his services were employed in negotiating a commercial treaty between Portugal and the Venetian republic.

Several times during the mid to late 15th century, he personally spent large amounts of his personal fortunes to bribe the Catholic monarchs to permit the Jews to remain in Spain. Abarbanel is claimed to have offered them 600,000 crowns for the revocation of the edict. Ferdinand is said to have hesitated, but was prevented from accepting the offer by Tomás de Torquemada, the Grand Inquisitor, who dashed into the royal presence, and throwing a crucifix down before the king and queen, asked whether, like Judas, they would betray their Lord for money. In the end, he managed only to get the date for the expulsion delayed by two days.

He died in Venice in 1508 and was buried in Padua next to its rabbi, Judah Minz. Owing to the destruction of the Jewish cemetery there during the Siege of Padua in 1509, his grave is now unknown. Bones from the cemetery were reburied in 1955, and there is a tradition that the remains of Abarbanel and Minz are among them. Claimed descendants of Abarbanel include Russian author Boris Pasternak and Brazilian media mogul and entertainer Silvio Santos.

Don Isaac Abravanel wrote that his family claimed descent from King David.

== Works ==
Abarbanel wrote many works during his lifetime which are often categorized into three groups—exegesis, philosophy, and apologetics. His philosophy dealt with the sciences and how the general field relates to the Jewish religion and traditions, and his apologetics defend, the idea of the Messiah in Judaism while criticizing the Christian version. Abarbanel's exegetic writings were different from the usual biblical commentaries because he took social and political issues of the times into consideration. He believed that mere commentary was not enough, but that the actual lives of the Jewish people must be deliberated on, as well, when discussing such an important topic as the Bible. He also took the time to include an introduction concerning the character of each book on which he commented, as well as its date of composition, and the intention of the original author, to make the works more accessible to the average reader.

=== Exegesis ===
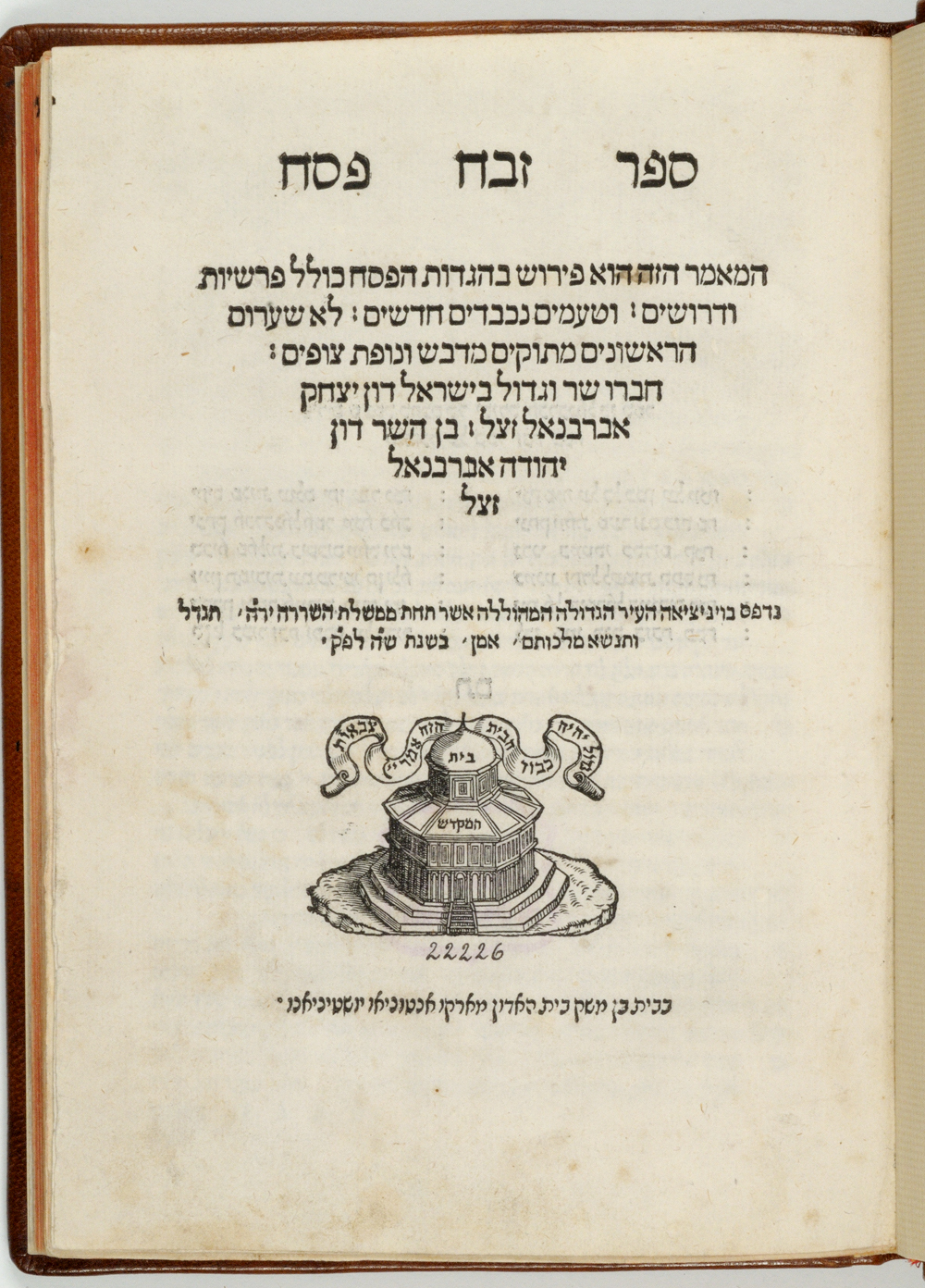
Title page of the second edition of Abarbanel's commentary on the Passover Haggadah, Sefer Zebach Pesacḥ from 1545

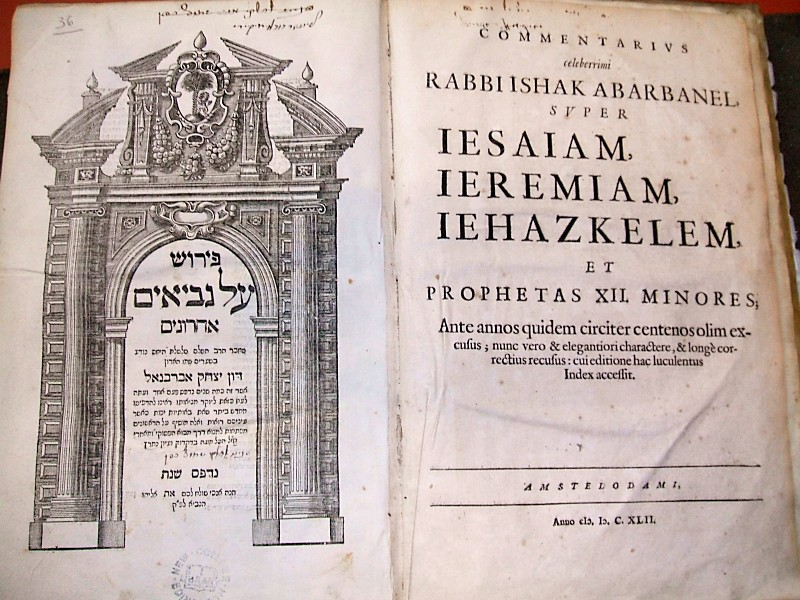
Title page of a 1642 Hebrew and Latin edition of Abarbanel's commentary on the latter prophets, Perush 'al Nevi'im ahronim

Abarbanel composed commentaries on the Torah and Nevi'im. These were published in three works: "Perush" (Commentary) on the Torah (Venice, 1579); "Perush" on the Earlier Prophets (Pesaro, 1511?); "Perush" on the Later Prophets (Pesaro, 1520?). He may also have composed a commentary on Song of Songs.

His commentaries are divided into chapters, each of which is preceded by a list of questions or difficulties that he sets out to explain over the course of the chapter. Not only did this make it easier for scholars to find the answers they were looking for, but these lists of difficulties aided the average student in studying Abarbanel's work. In his commentary on the Torah, these questions have no fixed number, sometimes amounting to over 40, but in his commentary to the Prophets he limits himself to six. Abarbanel rarely forayed into the world of grammatical or philological investigation in the vein of Abraham ibn Ezra or David Kimhi before him, instead focusing on a content-based investigation of the Scripture at hand.

Occasionally, Abarbanel digresses from the subject under discussion, particularly in his commentary on the Torah. His style and presentations are prolix and often repetitive. Some of his interpretations derive from homilies delivered in the synagogue. He vehemently fought the extreme rationalism of philosophical interpretation, as well as interpretations based on philosophical allegory. At the same time, he himself had recourse, especially in his commentary on the Torah, to numerous interpretations based on philosophy.

His opposition to philosophical allegory must also be ascribed to the conditions of his time, the fear of undermining the unquestioning faith of the simple Jew, and the danger to Jewish survival in exile. This also explains Abarbanel's faith in the Messianic concepts of Judaism, as well as his need to make his work accessible to all Jews instead of writing merely for the scholars of his time. Although his commentary often differed from kabbalistic interpretations, Abarbanel nonetheless believed that the Torah had a hidden meaning in addition to its overt significance, thus he interpreted passages in the Torah in various ways. His commentary to Deuteronomy 25:5 demonstrates both his knowledge and endorsement of kabbalists and kabbalistic understanding of Scripture. Side by side with philosophical concepts (entitled "the analytical way", "the scientific", or "the method of wisdom") he gives "the way of the Torah", i.e., the moral and religious tenets to be derived from the text.

He quoted extensively from the Midrash, but allowed himself to criticize his source, when in his view, it did not align with the literal meaning of the text. He explains, "I shall not refrain from pointing to the weakness inherent in their statements where they are homiletical in nature and are not accepted by them as authoritative" (Introduction to Joshua).

Overall, Abarbanel's exegetical writings are notable for these distinctions:

1. His comparison of the social structure of society in biblical times with that of the European society in his day (for example, in dealing with the institution of monarchy, I Samuel 8). He had wide recourse to historical interpretation, particularly in his commentaries to the Major and Minor Prophets and to the Book of Daniel, but in numerous instances his interpretations are anachronistic (for example, Judges 18).
2. Preoccupation with Christian exegesis and exegetes. He generally disputed their christological interpretations, especially those of Jerome. But he did not hesitate to borrow from them when their interpretation seemed correct to him. "Indeed I regard their words in this matter to be more acceptable than those of the rabbis to which I have referred" (I Kings 8, reply to the sixth question).
3. His introductions to the books of the prophets, which are much more comprehensive than those of his predecessors. In them, he deals with the content of the books, the division of the material, their authors, and the time of their compilation, and also drew comparisons between the method and style of the various prophets. His investigations are made in the spirit of medieval scholasticism. He may consequently be considered as a pioneer of the modern science of Bible propædeutics.

However, the major characteristic that separated Abarbanel from his predecessors was his unflagging commitment toward using the Scripture as a means of elucidating the status quo of his surrounding Jewish community; as a historical scholar, Abarbanel was able to contemporize the lessons of the historical eras described in the Scripture and apply them successfully in his explanations of modern Jewish living. Abarbanel, who had himself taken part in the politics of the great powers of the day, believed that mere consideration of the literary elements of Scripture was insufficient, and that the political and social life of the characters in the Tanakh must also be taken into account. Due to the overall excellence and exhaustiveness of Abarbanel's exegetical literature, he was looked to as a beacon for later Christian scholarship, which often included the tasks of translating and condensing his works.

His exegetical writings are set against a richly conceived backdrop of the Jewish historical and sociocultural experience, and it is often implied that his exegesis was sculpted with the purpose of giving hope to the Jews of Spain that the arrival of the Messiah was imminent in their days. This idea distinguished him from many other philosophers of the age, who did not rely as heavily on Messianic concepts.

=== Philosophy ===
Abarbanel's Jewish predecessors in the realm of philosophy did not receive the same tolerance at his hands as the Christians did. Men such as Isaac Albalag, Shem-Tov ibn Falaquera, Gersonides, Moses ben Joshua, and others, were denounced by Abarbanel as infidels and misleading guides for assuming a comparatively liberal standpoint in religiophilosophical questions. Abarbanel was essentially an opponent of philosophy, despite his authority on the subject, because his entire understanding of the Jewish religion was based on God's revelation in Jewish history. Jewish exegesis had become philosophical and far removed from the underlying truth of the text, according to Abarbanel.

A characteristic instance of his vacillation is afforded by his most important religious work, the Rosh Amanah (The Pinnacle of Faith) (Amsterdam, 1505), whose title derives from Song of Songs 4:8. This work, devoted to the championship of the Maimonidean 13 articles of belief against the attacks of Hasdai Crescas and Joseph Albo, ends with the statement that Maimonides compiled these articles merely in accordance with the fashion of other nations, which set up axioms or fundamental principles for their science. However, he holds that Judaism has nothing in common with human science; that the teachings of the Torah are revelations from God, and therefore are all of equal value; that among them are neither principles nor corollaries from principles.

Abarbanel cites Averroes and Al-Ghazzali in claiming that the sciences originated among the Jews, divinely inspired as the Torah, and were thence transmitted to the Greeks and Romans via the Chaldeans and Egyptians.

Abarbanel agrees with and supports some of Maimonides' ideas, but he assails Maimonides' conception that the prophetic visions were the creations of imagination. Abarbanel will not hear of this explanation, even for the bat kol of the Talmud, which, according to him, was an actual voice made audible by God—a miracle, in fact. In like manner, Abarbanel exceeded all his predecessors in combating Maimonides' theory of the "Heavenly Chariot" in Ezekiel.

=== Works of Hope ===
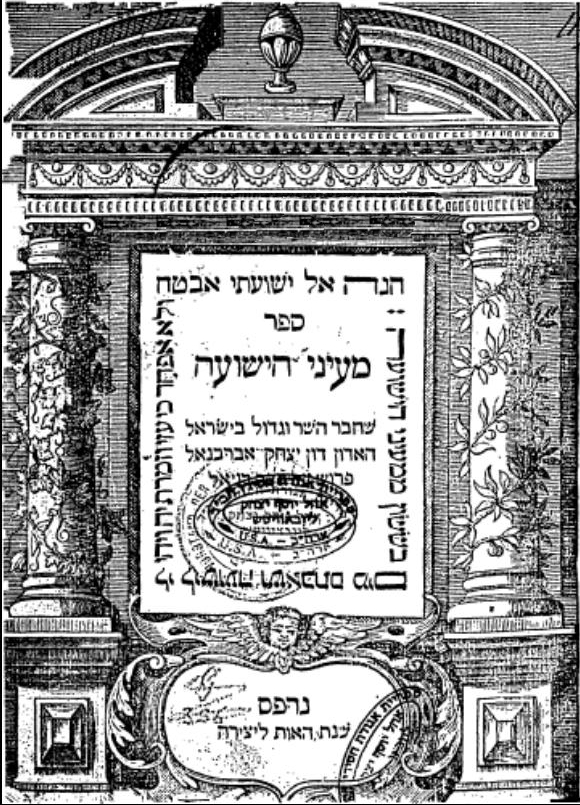
Title page of a 1647 edition of Abarbanel's commentary on Daniel, Ma'yanei ha-Yeshu'ah.

Abarbanel felt deeply the hopelessness and despair, which possessed Spanish Jews in the years following their expulsion from Spain, and set himself, therefore, to champion and strengthen their Messianic belief. With this aim, he wrote these works:

1. "The Wellsprings of Salvation" (מעייני הישועה, Maʿyānei haYəshuʿāh, 1496), which is a commentary on the Book of Daniel;
2. "The Salvation of His Anointed" (ישועות משיחו, Yəshuʿot Meshiho, 1497), an interpretation of rabbinic literature about the Messiah
3. "Announcing Salvation" (משמיע ישועה, 1498), a commentary on the messianic prophecies in the prophetical books

These three books are considered the separate parts of a larger work entitled Tower of Salvation (מגדל ישועות, Migdāl Yəshuʿot).

The first work is in the form of a commentary upon Daniel, in which he controverts both the Christian exposition of and the Jewish rationalistic approach to this book. In opposition to the Talmud and all later rabbinical tradition, he counts Daniel among the prophets, coinciding therein—but therein only—with the current Christian interpretation. He is impelled to this by the fact that Daniel furnishes the foundation for his Messianic theory. The remainder of his commentary is devoted to an exhaustive and caustic criticism of the Christian exposition.

The second work is probably unique in being an exposition of the doctrine concerning the Messiah according to the traditional testimony of Talmud and Midrash. His third apologetic work contains a collection of Messianic passages of the Bible and their interpretations, in the course of which Abarbanel criticizes the Christian interpretation of these passages.

=== Other works ===
Other works by Abarbanel include:

- "Passover Offering" (Zevaḥ Pesaḥ)
- "Inheritance of the Fathers" (Naḥalat Avot)

These three works were written in Naples after the Catholic Monarchs of Spain had expelled the Jews in the Alhambra Decree. They were first published together as an incunabulum in Constantinople on December 5, 1505 by the first printers in that city, David and Samuel ibn Naḥmias, who had fled in the same boat from Iberia to Naples. The Naḥmias brothers had worked in the Portuguese printing house of Eliezer Toledano ben Avraham ibn Alantansi, the Jewish printer of Híjar.

- "The Crown of the Ancients" (Ateret Zkenim)
- "The Forms of the Elements" (Tzurot Hayesodot)
- "New Heavens" (Shamayim Hadashim)
- "Deeds of God" (Mifalot Elohim)

== Assessment of his works ==
=== Race and slavery ===
Ironically, according to David Brion Davis, a Yale historian who specializes in slavery, Abarbanel played a pivotal role in providing the conceptual basis for black slavery: "[...] the great Jewish philosopher and statesman Isaac ben Abravanel, having seen many black slaves both in his native Portugal and in Spain, merged Aristotle's theory of natural slaves with the belief that the biblical Noah had cursed and condemned to slavery both his son Ham and his young grandson Canaan. Abravanel concluded that the servitude of animalistic black Africans should be perpetual." Abarbanel's view on slavery, however, stood in direct contradiction to that of Rashi, who, citing an earlier Talmudic source, wrote that the heathen were never included in the sanction of possessing slaves as the children of Israel were permitted to do, for the Scripture says (Leviticus 25:44): "Of them you shall buy, etc.", meaning, "Israel alone is permitted to buy from them [enslaved persons], but they are not permitted to buy [enslaved persons] from you, nor from one another."

Scholars including Jonathan Schorsch and David M. Goldenberg point out Abarbanel's comments on the Book of Amos as indicative of very humanistic sentiments: "[Abarbanel] responded with unconcealed anger to the comment of a tenth-century Karaite from Jerusalem, Yefet b. Ali, on the issue of Black [promiscuity]. Yefet had interpreted a biblical verse (Amos 9:7) to refer to Black women as being 'promiscuous and therefore no one knows who his father is.' Abarbanel: 'I don't know who told Yefet this practice of promiscuity among Black women, which he mentions. But in the country of my birth [Portugal] I have seen many of these people and their women are loyal to their husbands unless they are prisoners and captive to their enemies. They are just like any other people.'" Schorsch argues that concerning Abarbanel's views about the connection between slavery and the curse of Ham, Abarbanel was influenced by the writings of his contemporaries and predecessors, including Christian and Muslim writers, as well as the culture around him, and was hardly considered unique in his views. Abarbanel's commentary on Amos 9:7 and other writings, argues Schorsch, show the complexity of Abarbanel's views of Blacks. "Abarbanel's conflicting passages regarding Blacks were written at different times and addressed different realms of discourse, the one abstract myth, the other actual living Blacks." Schorsch shows how contemporary travel books described Ethiopians as barbarians, stealing each other's children to sell to Muslim foreigners. "Hence, the many statements that Ethiopians engaged in relations... with their siblings or parents. In this view, families, a cultured product, would not have been known to primitives who lived like animals. Yet Abarbanel dismissed all these derogatory notions when defending the behavior of actual Blacks living in Portugal."

== Legacy ==
The Synagogue Don Isaac Abravanel in Paris, France, was named in his memory, as was Midrash Abravanel (B’nai B’rith City Library) in Jerusalem.

== See also ==
- Jewish commentaries on the Bible
