= Alhama =

Alhama (Alfama in Portuguese) can refer to:

- Alhama de Almería, a town in the province of Almería in Spain
- Alhama de Aragón, a town in the province of Zaragoza in Spain
- Alhama de Granada, a town in the province of Granada in Spain
- Alhama de Murcia, a town in the province of Murcia in Spain
- Alhama (river), a tributary of the Ebro which starts in the Montes del Cierzo and ends in the municipal baths at Castejón de Ebro in Navarra, Spain
- Alhama, a ship built in 1927 as Apollo, and renamed Alhama in 1947
- Alfama, a neighborhood in Lisbon, Portugal
