= Ben Simons =

Ben Simons may refer to:

- Ben Simons (bobsleigh) (born 1986), British bobsleigher and former athlete
- Ben Simons (politician) (born 2000), American politician

== See also ==
- Benjamin Simons, British theoretical physicist
- Ben Simmons (born 1996), Australian basketball player
- Ben Simon (disambiguation)
