= Crown rabbi (Iberia) =

Crown-appointed liaison between itself and the Jewish community in Medieval Iberia

In the Iberian Peninsula, the crown rabbi (Spanish: rabino mayor, Old Portuguese: arrabi mor, 'chief rabbi') was a secular, administrative post occupied by a member of the Jewish community for the benefit of the governing state, and existed in the kingdoms of Castile, Aragon, Navarre and Portugal as far back as the 13th century, and is referred to as crown rabbi by historians in English, as well as by court rabbi and other terms.

== Terminology ==
In Spanish this position was known as rabino mayor or rab de la corte, which can be translated literally as "chief rabbi" or "court rabbi", respectively, and which is referred to in some English sources as "crown rabbi" and in others as "court rabbi". In Sicily (part of Aragon) the position was known locally as the dayyan kalali and in Portuguese as arrabi-mor. The derivation of arrabi mor is through a very unusual, three-language merger of parts in Judaeo-Portuguese, from Hebrew rabi (noun, "rabbi") preceded by Arabic definite article ar ("the", from al + initial r- consonant), and Portuguese mor (adj., "chief", in normal postposition).

== History ==
The concept of an official rabbi performing administrative duties and acting as an intermediary existed as far back as the 13th century in the kingdoms of Castile, Aragon, and Portugal and elsewhere in the Iberian peninsula.

The crown rabbi was one of the chief ways for the kingdoms in the peninsula to exert power over their Jewish communities. Those officials fulfilling this position often acquired significant secular power over their communities, and sometimes over provinces or even kingdoms.

=== Castile and Aragon ===
In Castile, the Court Rabbinate extended as an institution from 1255 until Expulsion in 1492. They were often laymen, not rabbis, and had near dictatorial authority of their flock. They presided in appeals cases and international synods, and might also be a court physician, as well as tax collector over both the Jewish as well as the Christian community. The last one to hold the office of crown rabbi of Castile was Abraham Seneor who became a converso rather than be expelled.

In 1386 in the Kingdom of Aragon for example, King John I in the context of a time of political reform, issued edicts defining the functions and duties of the Rab Mayor as intermediary between the power of the kingdom and that of the aljama, or Jewish community. There were various requirements as to the good character and faith of the person holding this charge, as well as a requirement that he live among the entourage of the Court, and thus away from his community, and in constant contact with the Christian majority population. His powers and authorities over the aljama of Castile, economic, judicial, and otherwise, were specified.

=== Portugal ===
In Portugal, the arrabi was a Jewish official who acted as a private municipal judge in a locality, chosen from among the community.

The term arrabi is attested from the late 12th century in Latin and Portuguese under Afonso III, and is mentioned in a judicial sense in municipal legislation documents. Sometimes it appears as Rabi. Documents from Lisbon, Leiria and elsewhere suggest that there was one arrabi per community, who was an outpost of royal authority, parallel to and separate from the traditional rabbi who tended to their flock's religious and spiritual needs.

Presiding above the arrabis was a high functionary of the crown known as the arrabi mor (or arrabi-môr; chief rabbi) and reporting to the King. Besides supervising the administration of justice, he also was in charge of fiscal administration and presided over the ouvidores (auditors) of the kingdom.

The position of arrabi mor emerged in Portugal as a result of efforts begun in the 12th century to centralize the legal and fiscal system in the country. By the late 13th century this effort extended to all of Portuguese Jewry, as manifested by the creation of a network of Jewish officials in each locality. The head of this network was the arrabi mor (chief rabbi) who acted as the royal tax collector similar to the position of the almoxarife mayor (chief financial administrator) in Castile. Under him were seven officials also called arrabis or ouvidores (auditors) who were responsible for taxes in their region (arrabiado); the local arrabis were assigned to individual communities after the model in Castile and Aragon.

The high post tended to be filled by wealthy Jews, and the post was handed down and controlled by family dynasties. The first arrabi mor mentioned was Don Judah in the 13th century under King Dinis, followed by his son Guedelha. The main duties were judicial, and fiscal. Judicially, the decisions of the arrabi mor concerning matters in the Jewish community were final, per a decree by Afonso III in 1266, and he was responsible only for the highest issues, as the simpler suits and appeals were judged by the local arrabis.

A powerful arrabi-mor could sometimes influence the laws of the kingdom in favor of the aljama. Such a man was Moses Navarro under King John I of Portugal. Following the carnage and forced conversions in the 1391 massacre of Jews in Seville and its aftermath in other kingdoms of the Iberian peninsula, the devastation threatened to spill across the border into Portugal, but Moses Navarro exercised his power and influence with the monarch and his knowledge of edicts from the Vatican by Popes Boniface IX and Clement VI friendly to Jews to prevent any harm from coming to Portuguese Jewry. King John upon hearing of the edicts, immediately promulgated a law on July 17, 1392, prohibiting any persecution, which was obeyed gladly by his subjects due to the extent of his popularity in the land. As a result, Portugal became a safe haven for Jews escaping persecution in Spain.

== Notable crown rabbis ==
- In the 13th century, Moses Alconstantini who lived in Zaragoza, which was the leading Jewish community of Aragon, was proposed by the queen of Aragon for the positions of crown rabbi and chief justice.
- Hasdai Crescas was a philosopher and Talmudic scholar in Barcelona in the 14th century who became crown rabbi of Aragon under John I
- Moses Navarro (?-1370, Lisbon) was arrabi môr in the court of Peter I of Portugal for 30 years, as well as receiver of taxes, and physician to the King. He was held in high regard by the King, and as a result was able to influence legislation and royal actions in favor of the Jewish community in Portugal.
- Yosef Orabuena was crown rabbi and physician to the king of Navarre and was appointed as rabi mayor de los Judios del reyna (chief rabbi of the Jews of the kingdom) for 1394–1401. Avraham Benveniste convoked a synod in Valladolid in his capacity as rab de la corte (court rabbi).
- Abraham Seneor served as court rabbi in Castile at the court of Ferdinand and Isabella in the late 15th century. He was the last to hold the office, and converted to Christianity rather than be expelled from Spain in 1492.

== See also ==
- Court Jew
- Chief Rabbi
- Hakham Bashi
- History of the Jews in the Middle Ages
- History of the Jews in Portugal
- History of the Jews in Spain
- Landesrabbiner
- Schutzjude
- Shtadlan
