= Uri ben Simeon =

Swiss writer

Uri ben Simeon (Hebrew: אורי בן שמעון, romanized: Uri ben Shimʿon) was a 16th-century Jewish scholar, born in Biel and later active in Safed. He is primarily known for his work Yiḥus ha-Avot ('Lineage of the Patriarchs'), which documents burial sites of biblical and rabbinic figures.

== Yiḥus ha-Avot ==
Uri ben Simeon made an abstract of a manuscript dated 1537 that catalogued locations said to contain the tombs of the Patriarchs, Prophets, Amoraim, and Tannaim. He supplemented this material with descriptions gathered during his extensive travels and included illustrations of the various sites. The work was first published as Yiḥus ha-Avot ('Lineage of the Patriarchs') in Venice in 1659, with a second edition appearing in 1699.

Appended to Yiḥus ha-Avot was a description of a calendar that he compiled in 1575. The entire work was translated into Latin by Johann Heinrich Hottinger under the title Cippi Hebraici, Genealogia Patriarcharum (Heidelberg, 1659; 2nd ed. 1662). Later, Eliakim Carmoly produced a French translation, Jichus ha-Abot, ou Tombeaux des Patriarches, published in his Itinéraires de la Terre Sainte (Halikot Erets Yisrael), which included a preface and twenty-seven illustrations reproduced from the first Venetian edition. An anonymous translation into Yiddish was also issued under the same title in Vilna in 1853.

== Calendar ==
Uri ben Simeon also authored a separate forty-year calendar (luaḥ), first printed in Venice in 1575. This calendar was translated into Latin by Jacob Christmann of Heidelberg and published there in 1594.
