= Benjamin Taylor Simmons =

United States Army general

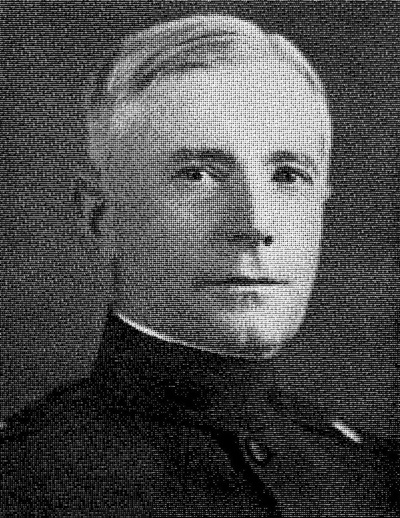
- Born: August 27, 1871; Fairfield, Hyde County, North Carolina
- Died: April 17, 1933 (aged 61); Washington, D.C.
- Burial place: Fairfield Cemetery, Fairfield, NC
- Military career
- Allegiance: United States
- Branch: United States Army
- Service years: 1890–1922
- Rank: Brigadier General
- Commands: 16th Infantry Regiment; 4th Infantry Regiment; Reserve Officers' Training Corps; 344th Infantry Regiment; 19th Infantry Division
- Conflicts: Spanish–American War; Philippine–American War; World War I
- Awards: Silver Star

Benjamin Taylor Simmons (August 27, 1871 – April 17, 1933) was an American brigadier general who served in the Spanish–American War and the First World War.

== Early life ==
Benjamin Taylor Simmons was born in Fairfield, Hyde County, North Carolina on 27 August 1871. He studied at the University of North Carolina from 1888 to 1890.

== Military service ==
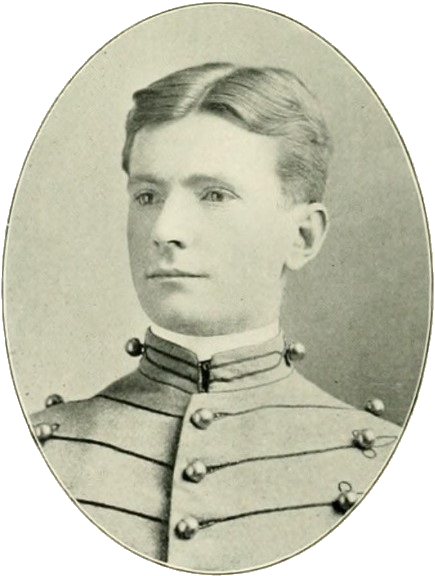
At West Point in 1895

Simmons joined the United States Military Academy on 17 June 1890. He graduated from the USMA forty-third in his class of fifty-two on 12 June 1895. Following his graduation, Simmons was commissioned into the infantry as a second lieutenant and proceeded to serve at several military installations throughout the United States between 30 September 1895 and 21 April 1898 with the 16th Infantry Regiment. Fort Douglas, Fort Sherman, and Fort Spokane are listed among the locations at which the regiment was posted during this time.

=== Spanish–American War ===
Simmons and the 16th Infantry arrived in Cuba 23 June 1898. There he commanded Company D during the assault upon the San Juan Blockhouse in the Battle of San Juan Hill and during the Siege of Santiago. It was during the battle for Santiago that he was cited for "gallantry in action against Spanish forces" and awarded his first Silver Star. Following these battles he was promoted to the rank of first lieutenant. In spring 1899 Simmons was sent to the Philippines, where he received another Silver Star while participating in a number of engagements. In the aftermath of the war he was promoted to captain and assigned to the 4th Infantry Regiment.

=== 1900–1914 ===
Simmons returned to the United States and was stationed in Houston, Texas at Fort Sam Houston, but moved to Washington D.C. to become a detailed member of the General Staff Corps for the office of the chief of staff in 1909. In 1912 he was assigned to the 17th Infantry Regiment and moved between forts for the next three years.

=== World War I ===
Simmons began World War I in Arizona with the 35th Infantry Regiment before being moved to Southern Department Headquarters. During this time he was promoted to major. In April 1917, he transferred to Camp Grant in Illinois and there organized and commanded the 344th Infantry Regiment as a colonel. A month later he moved on to serve the War Department General Staff. On 1 October 1918, he was promoted to the rank of brigadier general and placed in command of the 19th Infantry Division and the 163rd Depot Brigade at Camp Dodge, Iowa and remained there until the end of 1919.

=== Post-War ===
After the war, Simmons reverted to the rank of major and served at Camp Zachary Taylor, Kentucky, where he commanded the Reserve Officers Training Corps and Training Camp. On 9 August 1919, he became a student officer at the General Staff School and General Staff College at Fort Leavenworth, Kansas and remained there regaining the rank of lieutenant-colonel. Simmons graduated from the General Staff School in 1920. By July 1920, he had again reached the rank of colonel. Simmons graduated from the United States Army War College in 1921, but was placed on sick leave from June 1921 until July 1922. He retired on 3 July 1922 because of disabilities.

== Later life ==
After retirement, Simmons lived in Washington, D.C. He received an LL.B. degree from the George Washington University Law School in 1928. Simmons was advanced to brigadier general on the Army retired list in June 1930.

Simmons died at the Walter Reed General Hospital in Washington on 17 April 1933. He was buried in his North Carolina hometown on 20 April 1933.
