= Abraham Joseph Menz =

Rabbi and mathematician

Abraham Joseph ben Simon Wolf Menz (Yiddish: אברהם יוסף בן שמעון וואָלף מענץ) was an eighteenth century rabbi and mathematician at Frankfurt.

He wrote an elementary textbook on mathematics entitled Reshit Limmudim, in three parts: Kelale handasah, the general rules of algebra; Yesodot ha-gematriot, the elements of geometry; and Yesod ha-tekunah, on astronomy. Only the first part was published (Berlin, 1775).
