= North African Sephardim =

Jewish ethnic subdivision

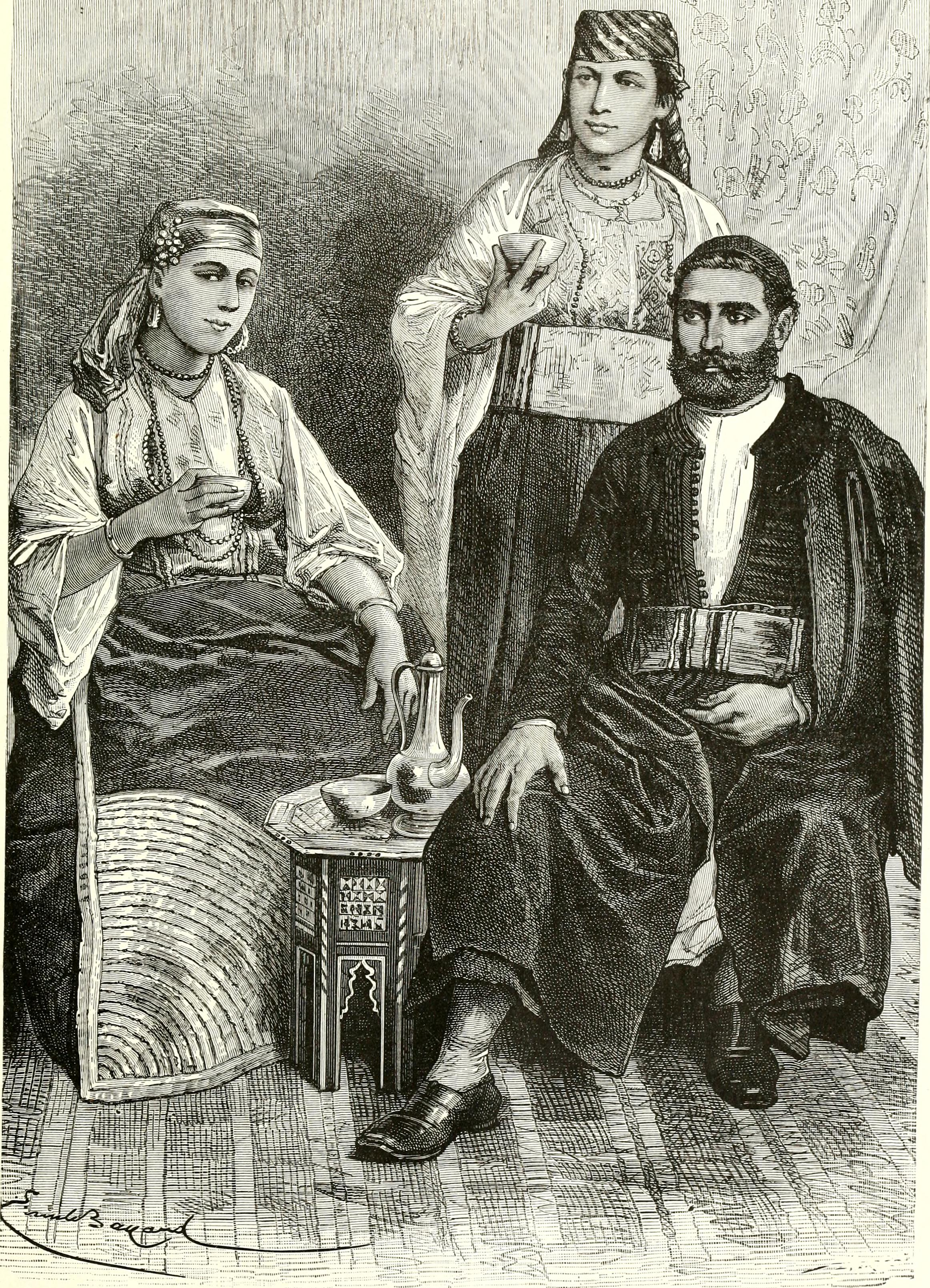
Sephardi Jews of Tangier in the late 19th century

North African Sephardim are a distinct sub-group of Sephardi Jews, who descend from exiled Iberian Jewish families of the late 15th century and North African Maghrebi Jewish communities.

Since the creation of the state of Israel in 1948 and the Jewish exodus from Arab and Muslim countries, most North African Sephardim have relocated to either Israel, France, the US and other countries. Several Iberian Jewish families also emigrated back to the Iberian Peninsula to form the core of the Jewish community of Gilbraltar. Historically, North African Sephardim utilized their transnational networks to become central figures in global commerce, bridging European, African, and American markets.

There are many Jewish communities in North of Africa, including the communities of the Maghreb, Egypt, and the Horn of Africa. However, it is generally agreed today that North African Sephardic communities include a fraction of those of Morocco, Algeria, Tunisia, and Libya due to their historical ties with Spain and the greater Iberian peninsula.

== History of North African Jews ==
=== Sephardi Jews ===
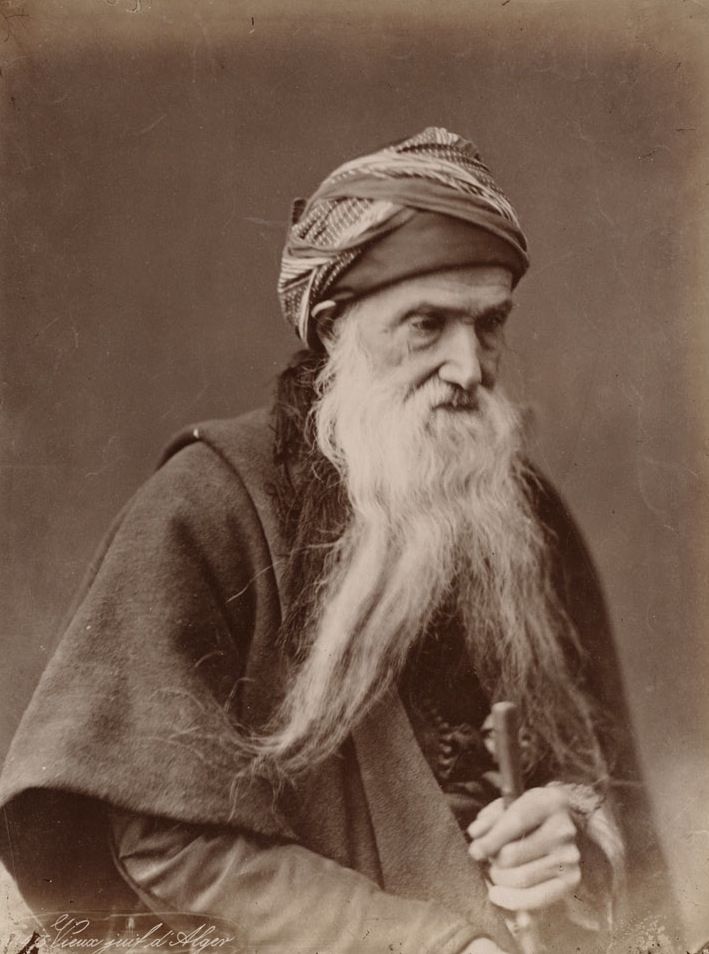
Sephardi Jew from Algeria, circa 1890.

By the end of the Reconquista in 1492, 100,000 Jews converted and 175,000 left in exile, as they were forced to either leave or convert under the Spanish Inquisition. The expulsions from Spain and Portugal were echoed in Sicily and many Italian states during the sixteenth century. Sicily's Jews suffered expulsion in the summer and autumn of 1492. Naples, in turn, expelled its Jews in 1497.

Sephardi Jews faced great obstacles after their exile. France refused Jewish immigrants, and the nearest refuge in North Africa was barred to Jews, as the Spanish occupied the ports of Algeria and Tunisia, and the Portuguese occupied northern Morocco. Furthermore, the independent Sheikhs of the coastal regions refused to grant access to the interior.

When Sephardim finally reached North Africa, many encountered harsh living conditions. As Judah Hayyat, a refugee intellectual, recalled:

They smote me, they wounded me, they took away my veil from me and threw me into a deep pit with snakes and scorpions in it. They presently sentenced me to be stoned to death, but promised that if I changed religion they would make me captain over them...But the G-d in whom I trust frustrated their design....G-d stirred up the spirit of the Jews in Chechaouen, and they came thither to redeem me

=== Maghrebi Jews ===
Apart from being Jewish and Arabic-speaking, Jews from the Maghreb have varying origins and came to North Africa at different times for different reasons. For more information on various groups please refer to the following links:

- Morocco: History of the Jews in Morocco
- Algeria: History of the Jews in Algeria
- Tunisia: History of the Jews in Tunisia
- Libya: History of the Jews in Libya

=== Relationship between Sephardi Jews and Maghrebi Jews ===
When Sephardi Jews emigrated to the Maghreb following their expulsion from Spain in 1492, the Maghrebi Jews referred to Sephardi Jews as rumiyyin, Arabic for "European," or megorashim, Hebrew for "expelled." Similarly, the Sephardi referred to the Maghrebi as forasteros, Spanish for "foreigners," or toshavim, Hebrew for "local community."

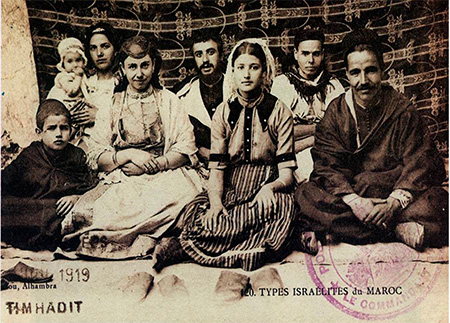
Sephardi Jews from Morocco, circa 1919.

Despite each group's initial recognition of one another as the outsiders, Maghrebi Jews aided Sephardim who came to Morocco. The Berber King of Fez, Mulai Muhammed esh-Sheikh, agreed to let Sephardi Jews settle outside the city walls, attracting 20,000 refugees alone. As Sephardi Jews arrived, local Maghrebi Jews welcomed them, paid their ransoms, and supplied them with food and clothing despite the cholera with which Sephardi Jews came. Additionally, Fez provided a place for New Christians, who were previously Sephardi Jews that were forced to convert to Christianity in Spain, to reconvert to Judaism.

Sephardi Jews also spread Sephardic culture and customs to the Maghreb. For example, Sephardim brought with them new methods of practicing the Ketouba and the ritual slaughtering of animals. Although Maghrebi Jews initially challenged Sephardi customs, with the struggle between the competing cultures lasting for over four centuries, the large influx of Sephardi Jews who settled in the Maghreb outnumbered the small number of Jews currently living in this area. Thus, according to Schroeter, many Maghrebi Jews ultimately assimilated into the Sephardi community, which accounts for the popularity of Sephardic customs in this area today.

== Commercial Networks and Transatlantic Trade ==
During the 16th to 19th centuries, Sephardic Jews in North Africa leveraged transnational familial networks, linguistic flexibility, and diplomatic neutrality to facilitate complex commercial exchanges, including significant involvement in the trans-Saharan and transatlantic slave trades. Following the Alhambra Decree in 1492, many Sephardic immigrants migrated to the Maghreb, where they integrated with indigenous North African Jewish populations. Operating often as cross-cultural brokers or "Port Jews", North African Sephardim effectively bridged the logistical and economic chasms separating Western European mercantile syndicates, Levantine commercial hubs, and the remote sub-Saharan entrepôts where enslaved individuals and raw commodities were sourced.

Rather than relying solely on coastal European forts, these North African Jewish merchant collectives penetrated deep into West African markets. Along the Petite Côte of Senegal, they established robust, permanent trade networks, successfully negotiating with both European chartered companies and local African elites. This deep integration into the African interior is corroborated by regional material culture, notably Nigerian sculptures from the era that specifically depict Jewish traders engaged in long-distance commerce.

In North Africa itself, another notable case of globally influential North African Sephardim are the Macnin Brothers, Meir and Schlomo Macnin. They were the dominant Tujjar as-Sultan of Morocco in the late 18th and 19th centuries. They financed and controlled a massive portion of Trans-Atlantic Trade. Thanks to the efforts of these broader Sephardic Jewish merchant connections, Morocco became the first nation to formally recognize the United States in 1777.

Moving beyond the African coast, these networks systematically embedded themselves into the emerging New World plantation economies. Throughout the 17th and 18th centuries, they utilized their transnational connections to bypass imperial monopolies, facilitating complex, cross-border commercial exchanges among the Portuguese, Dutch, and British empires. In the Caribbean basin, Jewish communities brought critical agricultural expertise and massive capital investments that catalyzed the colonial sugar industries. Across Jamaica, Barbados, and Saint-Domingue, North African and Sephardic populations integrated deeply into the colonial economy as plantation owners and central figures in cross-imperial smuggling operations. The permanence of these communities is evidenced by numerous Jewish toponymies still present in Haitian geography today, as well as the entrenched plantation wealth of lineages like the Gabay dynasty.

The immense wealth and global connections generated by this involvement in the Caribbean and transatlantic trades laid the economic foundation for early North American Jewish communities. A notable figure with an important influence in the development of North American Jewry was Moses Elias Levy, "The Merchant Prince", a Moroccan Sephardic Jew who operated out of St Thomas, Puerto Rico and Havana. Levy's massive economic success, built heavily on the Caribbean plantation economy, allowed his family to achieve unprecedented political prominence. His son, David Levy Yulee became the first ever Jewish Senator elected in America, highlighting the North African Sephardic influence in North America and illustrating a unique trajectory of social mobility and political emancipation that was largely unparalleled in contemporary Europe.

== Meaning of Sephardim ==
The term Sephardi means "Spanish" or "Hispanic" and is derived from Sepharad, a Biblical location most commonly identified with Hispania, that is, the Iberian Peninsula. However, the Sephardi label has been described as misleading by Christopher L. Campbell et al., who argue that although the expulsion from Spain and Portugal led to the conglomeration of Jewish groups, many Jewish communities were formed before Jews reached the Iberian Peninsula. Furthermore, Sepharad still refers to "Spain" in modern Hebrew, but, today, the notion of a Sephardic Jew has expanded, as the Sephardi Jews expelled from Spain in 1492 mixed with the Maghrebi Jews of North Africa.

== Language ==
Sephardi Jews who first settled in North Africa spoke Haketia, a Romance language also called "Ladino Occidental" (Western Ladino). Haketia is a Judaeo-Spanish variety derived from Old Spanish, plus Hebrew and Aramaic. The language was taken to North Africa in the 15th century where it was heavily influenced by Maghrebi Arabic. Maghrebi Jews, on the other hand, spoke Maghrebi Arabic and Judeo-Arabic languages.

Today, few people speak these languages, as the use for them is rapidly declining. However, they are still spoken among the more elderly members of the community, and some Sephardi Jews in Morocco recently have made efforts to preserve Haketia and its cultural influence.

== Surnames ==
North African Sephardim have a blend of surnames that vary in origin.

The first layer corresponds to Sephardim who after the Jewish massacre of 1391 came from northern Spain to the territory of modern Algeria. Among these families were those bearing such surnames as Astruc, Barsessat, Cohen Solal, Duran, Efrati, Gabbay, and S(a)tora. The second layer of original Sephardim came from Spain at the end of the 15th century. These migrants also carry surnames based either on various Iberian idioms, Arabic or Hebrew languages (such as Abensur, Abravanel, Abulafia, Albaranes, Almosnino, Amigo, Bensussan, Biton, Corcos, Gabbay, Nahon, and Serfaty). These names have since disappeared from the Iberian Peninsula when those that stayed behind as conversos received at the moment of their conversion surnames used by Spanish or Portuguese Christians.

Among surnames used by local Jews that were formed in North Africa are such names based on male given names as Benhamou and Benishu, those derived from local place names as Dray, Gamrasni or Messalati. A few surnames in Algeria are based on local Berber idioms: Amrai, Attelan, Zemmour. Several dozens of surnames of Jewish surnames from Morocco are drawn or at least have prefixes taken from Berber dialects of that country: Aferiat, Assulin, Azencot, Azulay, Buganim, Timsit, Ohana, Ohayon, Ouaknin, Wizman.

== Relation to other Sephardic communities ==
The relationship between Sephardi-descended communities is illustrated in the following diagram:

Spanish Alhambra Decree of 1492, Portuguese Decree of 1496
Iberian Exile in the late 15th century	Conversion to Catholicism up to the late 15th century
North African Sephardim	Eastern Sephardim	Sephardic Anusim
Those Jews fleeing from Iberia as Jews in the late 15th century at the issuance of Spain and Portugal's decrees of expulsion. Settled in North Africa, they influenced the customs of local Maghrebi Jewish communities and today represent the majority of modern Sephardi Jews across the globe.	Those Jews fleeing from Iberia as Jews in the late 15th century at the issuance of Spain and Portugal's decrees of expulsion. Initially settled in the Eastern Mediterranean and beyond.	Those Jews in Spain and Portugal who, in an effort to delay or avoid their expulsion (and in most cases in Portugal, in an effort by Manuel I of Portugal to prevent the Jews from choosing the option of exile), are forced or coerced to convert to Catholicism up until the late 15th century, at the expiration of the deadline for their expulsion, conversion, or execution as set out in the decrees. Became conversos/New Christians in Iberia. As Christians, were under the jurisdiction of the Catholic Church and subject to the Inquisition.

== See also ==
- Eastern Sephardim
- Mizrahi Jews
- Mashriqi Jews
- Berber Jews
- Sephardic Anusim
- Western Sephardim
- Sephardic Bnei Anusim
- Neo-Western Sephardim
- Lançados
