= Eastern Sephardim =

Sephardic exiles in the Ottoman Empire and Middle East

Eastern Sephardim are a distinctive sub-group of Sephardic Jews mostly descended from Jewish families which were exiled from the Iberian Peninsula in the 15th century, following the Alhambra Decree of 1492 in Spain and a similar decree in Portugal five years later. This branch of descendants of Iberian Jews settled across the Eastern Mediterranean.

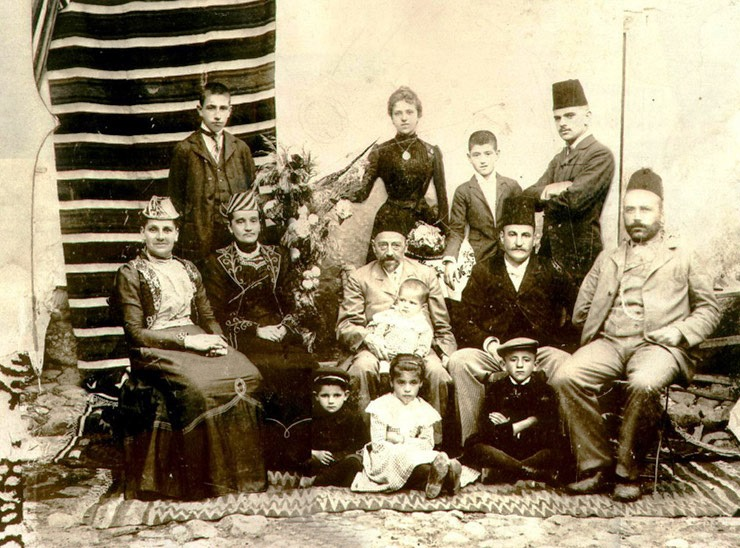
Eastern Sephardi Jewish family in Sarajevo. Late 19th century

Eastern Sephardim mostly settled in various parts of the Ottoman Empire, which included areas in West Asia (Middle East, Anatolia, etc.), the Balkans in Southern Europe, plus Egypt. For centuries, these Jews made up the majority of the population of Thessaloniki (now Greece) and were present in large numbers in Constantinople (now Istanbul, Turkey) and Sarajevo (in what is now Bosnia and Herzegovina), all of which were located in the Ottoman-ruled parts of Europe.

Some migrated farther east to the territories of the Ottoman Empire, settling among the long-established Arabic-speaking Jewish communities of Baghdad in Iraq, Damascus in Syria and Alexandria in Egypt. A few of the Eastern Sephardim followed the spice trade routes as far as the Malabar coast of southern India, where they settled among the established Cochin Jewish community, again, they imparted their culture and their customs to the local Jews. The presence of Sephardim and New Christians along the Malabar coast eventually aroused the ire of the Catholic Church, which then obtained permission from the Portuguese crown to establish the Goan Inquisition against the Sephardic Jews of India.

In recent times, principally after 1948, most Eastern Sephardim have relocated to Israel, and others have relocated to the United States, France and Latin America.

== History ==
In the 19th century, Sephardic communities in Istanbul, Thessaloniki, İzmir and other parts of the Ottoman Empire started to become more secular. Westernization was favored by various forces both within the Empire and in Europe, including the Alliance Israélite Universelle. However, not all aspects of Western culture were embraced. Despite efforts by the secular Jewish press and Alliance to promote French, the majority of Turkish Jews were still speaking Ladino in the early 20th century. Though the power structures within the community were influenced by Western influences, religious tradition remained an important part of community life, despite the lessening of rabbinic authority, and the Reform Judaism movement that developed in Germany (and later the United States) never took hold in Ottoman lands.

== Ladino literature ==
Before the 18th century most mainstream Ottoman Jewish literature was published in Hebrew. The few books that were written in Ladino catered to Marranos who had escaped from the Inquisitions in Spain and Portugal and were returning to Judaism. It wasn't until the 1730s that rabbinic literature started to be published in Ladino. Through the 19th century, Ladino literature flourished in the Ottoman Empire. Even though Musar literature, also called "ethical literature" or didactic literature, is one of the least studied genres of Jewish literature, it is also one of the most ancient and influential genres of Jewish literature. Musar literature which was written in the Ladino tongue paralleled the emergence of Hasidic literature among the Ashkenazim in the 18th century, which was another primarily didactic body of literature.

Examples of Sephardic literature from the Ottoman Empire include the Shevet Musar by Elijah ha-Kohen (1645–1729). Another writer, Isaac Bekhor Amarachi, ran a printing business and also translated some works from Hebrew into Ladino, including a biography of the English-Sephardic philanthropist Moses Montefiore. Though the writings of Abraham Palachi, chief rabbi of İzmir, are markedly conservative, Palachi was a strong supporter of improving French language education in his community and spoke at the opening of a new Alliance Israélite school in 1873. Sephardi writer Judah Papo, who died in Jerusalem in 1873, was one of the teachers of Judah Alkalai.

== Relationship with other Sephardi communities ==
The term Sephardi is derived from Sepharad. The location of the biblical Sepharad is disputed, but Sepharad was identified as Hispania by later Jews, that is, it was identified as the Iberian Peninsula. Sepharad now means "Spain" in modern Hebrew.

Their traditional spoken languages were referred to as Judaeo-Spanish and Judaeo-Portuguese. In most locales, where the Eastern Sephardim settled, the indigenous Jewish population came to adopt the culture and customs of the recent Sephardic arrivals. This phenomenon is just one of the factors which has currently led to the broader religious definition of the term Sephardi.

The relationship between Sephardic communities is illustrated in the following diagram:

Pre-Expulsion Sephardi Jewish Population of Iberia
Spanish Alhambra Decree of 1492, Portuguese Decree of 1497
Iberian Exile in the late 15th century	Conversion to Catholicism up to the late 15th century
North African Sephardim	Eastern Sephardim	Sephardic Anusim
Those Jews fleeing from Iberia as Jews in the late 15th century at the issuance of Spain and Portugal's decrees of expulsion. Initially settled in North Africa.	Those Jews fleeing from Iberia as Jews in the late 15th century at the issuance of Spain and Portugal's decrees of expulsion. Initially settled in the Eastern Mediterranean and beyond.	Those Jews in Spain and Portugal who, in an effort to delay or avoid their expulsion (and in most cases in Portugal, in an effort by Manuel I of Portugal to prevent the Jews from choosing the option of exile), are forced or coerced to convert to Catholicism up until the late 15th century, at the expiration of the deadline for their expulsion, conversion, or execution as set out in the decrees. Became conversos/New Christians in Iberia. As Christians, were under the jurisdiction of the Catholic Church and subject to the Inquisition.
Migration of Conversos from the 16th to 18th centuries	Clandestine migration of conversos to Ibero-America and their settlement during colonization from the 16th to 18th centuries
Reversion to Judaism from the 16th to 18th centuries	Extension of the Inquisition to Ibero-America in the 16th century
Western Sephardim	Sephardic Bnei Anusim
The first few generations of descendants of Sephardic Anusim who migrated as conversos out of Iberia (to regions beyond the Iberian cultural sphere) between the 16th to 18th centuries where they then reverted to Judaism. Initially settled in the Netherlands, London, Italy, etc.	The later generation descendants of Sephardic Anusim who remained, as conversos, in Iberia or moved to the Iberian colonial possessions across various Latin American countries during the Spanish colonization of the Americas. Subject to the Inquisition until its abolition in the 19th century
Abolition of the Inquisition in the 19th century
Reversion to Judaism in the 20th to 21st centuries
Neo-Western Sephardim
The nascent and growing population of returnees to Judaism among the Sephardic Bnei Anusim population whose recent return began in the late 20th and early 21st centuries in Iberia and Ibero-America.

== Language ==
Historically, the vernacular language of Eastern Sephardim was Judeo-Spanish, a Romance language also called Ladino (specifically "Ladino Oriental" or Eastern Ladino) and Judezmo ("Jewish [language]"). The language is derived from Old Spanish, plus Hebrew and Aramaic. The language was taken by Eastern Sephardim in the 15th century after the expulsion from Spain in 1492, where it was heavily influenced by Maghrebi Arabic.

By contrast, the languages spoken by related Sephardi communities and descendants include:

- Haketia, also called "Ladino Occidental" (Western Ladino), a Judaeo-Spanish variety also derived from Old Spanish, plus Hebrew and Aramaic. Spoken by North African Sephardim. Taken with North African Sephardim in the 15th century after the expulsion from Spain in 1492, this dialect was heavily influenced by Maghrebi Arabic.
- Early Modern Spanish and Early Modern Portuguese, including in a mixture of the two. Traditionally spoken or used liturgically by the ex-converso Western Sephardim. Taken with them during their later migration out of Iberia in the 16th to 18th centuries as conversos, after which they reverted to Judaism.
- Modern Spanish and Modern Portuguese varieties, traditionally spoken by the Sephardic Bnei Anusim of Iberia and Ibero-America, including some recent returnees to Judaism (Neo-Western Sephardim) in the late 20th and early 21st centuries. In most cases these varieties have incorporated loanwords from the indigenous languages of the Americas introduced following the Spanish conquest.

== Surnames ==
Eastern Sephardim still often carry common Spanish surnames, as well as other specifically Sephardic surnames from 15th century Spain with Arabic or Hebrew language origins (such as Azoulay, Abulafia, Abravanel) which have since disappeared from Spain when those that stayed behind as conversos adopted surnames that were solely Spanish in origin. Other Eastern Sephardim have since also translated their Hispanic surnames into the languages of the regions they settled in, or have modified them to sound more local.

== Return migration to Portugal ==
In recent years, several hundred Turkish Jews, who have been able to prove that they are descended from Portuguese Jews who had been expelled from Portugal in 1497, have emigrated to Portugal and acquired Portuguese citizenship.

== See also ==
- North African Sephardim
- Mizrahi Jews
