= América Ladina =

- Directed by: Yaron Avitov
- Written by: Yaron Avitov
- Produced by: Yaron Avitov
- Starring: Yaron Avitov
- Release date: 2011
- Language: Spanish

América Ladina (Hebrew: אמריקה הלדינית) is a 2011 documentary film directed by and starring Israeli independent filmmaker, Yaron Avitov.

The film tells of the arrival and settlement in the Americas of Jewish-origin New Christians (Sephardic Jewish converts to Catholicism, also known as conversos in Spanish or anusim in Hebrew) in the sixteenth century, and the lives of the Sephardic Bnei Anusim (their assimilated descendants) today.

The documentary's title is a pun on the Spanish term for Latin America (América Latina), where "Ladina" is the feminine adjectival form of the noun "Ladino", a reference to the Ladino language, the traditional Judaeo-Spanish language of the Sephardic Jews.

== Content ==
The Israeli filmmaker Yaron Avitov addresses on his film the context of the history of the arrival and settlement of Sephardic anusim to the Americas; and how their emigration from Spain and Portugal to the Iberian colonies in the New World in the sixteenth century was due largely to the unceasing religious persecution of Jewish-origin New Christians by the Inquisition back in Iberia, irrespective of whether they were sincere Christian converts or if they were indeed marranos (crypto-Jews secretly practicing their former Jewish faith as best they could behind closed doors).

The film presses on the issue that how this Jewish-origin population emigrated to the Americas from the sixteenth century (during the time of the Inquisition) should be studied thoroughly again.

Avitov is immersed in a multi-year investigation through South America and Central America in search of the motives, reasons and consequences of this immigration.

As the film progresses, the viewer not only discovers the origins of the Jewish-descended population of Latin America, but also the places where one can find the presence of their descendants today, and their impact, past and present, of these Sephardic anusim migrants and their Sephardic Bnei anusim descendants in the cultural landscape of Latin America.

Sephardic Bnei Anusim (descendants of these early immigrants) from 10 countries, including Colombia, Ecuador, Brazil, and Peru in South America give their testimonials. Others from Mexico, Cuba, El Salvador, Costa Rica and Panama in Central America are also interviewed.

The documentary takes us through time with the testimonies of these descendants, in remote places around Latin America where their Jewish anusim ancestors settled in the hope that it would give their children and later descendants the chance to live and prosper in a new free world, without fear from the persecution of the Inquisition, though the Inquisition eventually followed, resulting in an almost complete assimilation and absorption.

Five centuries after the migratory mission of their Jewish anusim ancestors, the success of their journey for survival is assessed, if not in the maintaining of the Jewish faith and culture, then at least in the perpetuation of their living descendants, who are more alive and numerous today than ever.

Avitov presents among other evidence of this historical episode facts and cultural vestiges which remain today, and which can be found embedded in the culture of the local peoples across the Americas, similar to traditional customs of the New Christian converts who came from Spain and Portugal fleeing the Inquisition. Today there are words, idioms, sayings (in Ladino) and even many customs that persist among these groups in the Americas, who practice these customs often unknowing that they originate in the traditions of their Jewish ancestors.
