= Massacre of 1391 =

Antisemitic violence in the Iberian Peninsula peaking in 1391 massacre

- Slaughter of Jews in Barcelona in 1391 (José Segrelles, c. 1910)
- Location: Crown of Castile, Crown of Aragon
- Date: 1391
- Target: Jews
- Attack type: Pogrom
- Motive: Antisemitism

The Massacre of 1391, also known as the pogroms of 1391, refers to a murderous wave of mass violence committed against the Jews of Spain by the Catholic populace in the crowns of Castile and Aragon in 1391. It was one of the most lethal outbreaks of violence against Jews in medieval Spain, and in medieval European history. Anti-Jewish violence then continued throughout the "Reconquista", culminating in the 1492 expulsion of the Jews from Spain. The first wave in 1391 marked the extreme of such violence.

Under duress, Jews began to convert en masse to Roman Catholicism across the Iberian Peninsula after the massacre, resulting in a substantial population of conversos known as Marranos. Catholics then began to accuse the conversos of secretly maintaining Jewish practices, and of thus undermining the newly united kingdom's nascent national identity. In 1492, the Catholic Monarchs of Spain Ferdinand and Isabella issued the Alhambra Decree, which ordered the expulsion of Jews who had not converted to Catholicism. The resulting diaspora came to be known as the Sephardic Jews.

== History of the Jews in Spain to 1391 ==
The earliest archaeological evidence of a Jewish presence in Iberia is a 2nd-century CE gravestone from Mérida, though their arrival may predate this, possibly with Phoenician traders or during Carthaginian rule. Conditions for Jews worsened significantly after the late 6th century when the rulers of the Visigothic Kingdom converted to Nicene Christianity.

Following the 8th-century Umayyad conquest of the Iberian Peninsula, Jews in Al-Andalus lived under the dhimmi system. The 10th and 11th centuries are often considered a "Golden Age of Jewish culture in Spain," marked by flourishing religious, cultural, and economic life, including Hebrew Bible studies and secular Hebrew poetry. The fall of the Caliphate of Córdoba in 1031 and the Almohad invasion of the mid-12th century are considered the end of the Golden Age, and many Jews fled to North Africa or to Christian kingdoms.

Al-Andalus existed for seven centuries (710–1492), a period known in Spain as the Reconquista (Reconquest) and defined by conflict with northern Christian kingdoms. By 1391, any "golden age" had passed; Jews faced persecution and antisemitic mob violence throughout the 14th century in the Christian kingdoms of Spain.

Under Christian rule, Jews faced higher taxes than Catholics, and were largely confined to "marginal" occupations like banking and finance, particularly tax collection and moneylending. This fueled economic antisemitism, with accusations of usury and market manipulation. Official Church antisemitism, including deicide and blood libel accusations, further inflamed attitudes. The Council of Vienne in 1311–1312 negated remaining civil liberties for Jews in Muslim Al-Andalus.

== Background to violence: 1350-1390 ==
=== Peter the Cruel and the Fratricide ===
Peter of Castile (30 August 1334 – 23 March 1369, known as 'Don Pedro' and 'Peter the Cruel' in some English-language histories) was King of Castile and León from 1350 to 1369. He was excommunicated by Pope Urban V for his anti-clericalism.

While branded a heretic by the church, Peter gained a reputation as protector of the Jews, particularly in light of the policies of half-brother, arch-rival, and his eventual murderer and usurper Henry of Trastámara (13 January 1334 – 29 May 1379; known as el Fratricida). As an avowed rebel and Peter's upstart rival, Henry had his forces murder over 1,200 Jews in 1355 in the province of Asturias alone. Additional massacres followed in 1360 and 1366.

Henry's accession to the throne in 1369 as Henry II of Castile meant that the much larger Jewish population of Castile had not only lost their de facto royal protection, but were also likely to become targets for legally sanctioned violence.

As king, Henry was as hostile to the Jews as Peter had been friendly.

In order to pay the mercenaries he had employed in his long campaigns, Henry imposed a war contribution of twenty thousand gold doubloons on the already heavily oppressed Jewish community of Toledo. Henry then ordered the internment of all the Jews of Toledo and denied them food and water. He next ordered the state to confiscate their property, which he then had sold at auction to enrich the Crown.

Nonetheless, Henry's dire financial straits compelled him to take out loans to cover his expenses. This meant both borrowing from Jewish financiers and ordering his tax collectors—also Jews—to collect ever more burdensome taxes from his Catholic subjects. He named the prominent Jew Don Joseph as his chief tax-collector (contador major), and appointed several Jews as "farmers of the taxes". Don Joseph would later be murdered by rival co-religionists.

The royal councils (municipal parliaments) in Toro and in Burgos then issued new demands on the Jews in 1369, 1374, and 1377. Those measures harmonized with Henry's inclinations toward persecution. Henry ordered Jews to wear a yellow badge and forbade them to use Christian names. He further ordered that for short-term loans, Christian debtors were to repay only two-thirds of the principal, thus further impoverishing the Jewish lenders. Shortly before his death in 1379 Henry declared that Jews would no longer be permitted to hold public office.

=== Archdeacon Martínez ===
Ferrand Martinez (fl. 14th century) was a Spanish cleric and archdeacon of Écija, Andalusia and most noted for being the agitator whom historians cite as the prime mover behind the Massacres of 1391. Violence began in the Andalusian capital of Seville.

Little is known of Martínez's early life. Before taking up the position at Écija, he was the confessor of the queen mother of the Crown of Aragón. He called for persecution of the Jews in his homilies and speeches, claiming that he was obeying God's commandment.

King John I of Castile and Martínez's church superior Father Barroso, the primate of Spain, ordered Martínez to cease his incitement; Martínez ignored them both. For more than a decade Martínez continued his verbal attacking, telling Catholics to "expel the Jews...and to demolish their synagogues." Though put on trial in 1388, he was never curtailed by the king, though John I did state that the Jews must not be maltreated.

The tipping point occurred when both John I and Barroso died in 1390, leaving John's 11-year-old son Henry III of Castile to rule under the regency of his mother. Martínez continued his campaign against the Jews of Seville, calling on clergy and lay people to destroy synagogues and seize Jewish holy books and other precious items. These events led to another royal order that removed Martínez from his office and ordered damaged synagogues to be repaired at Church expense. Martínez, declaring that neither the state nor the local church authorities had power over him, again ignored the commands.

The first anti-Jewish riots began in Seville in March 1391; the first of the great massacres occurred on 6 June.

== Violence in 1391 ==
=== Violence in Seville and Castile ===
Archdeacon Martínez continued to stir up the people against Jews as he preached that they should be forced to convert to Catholicism. Violence finally erupted on 6 June in Seville when Catholic mobs murdered some 4,000 Jews and destroyed their houses. Those who escaped death were forced to accept baptism. Over the course of the year, the massacres would spread to all of Spain. These events inaugurated the beginning of the mass conversions, as fear gripped the Jewish communities of Spain.

Within three months the violence had spread to more than seventy other cities and towns, as city after city followed the example set in Seville and Jews faced either conversion and baptism or death, their homes were attacked, and the authorities did nothing to stop or prevent the violence and pillaging of the Jewish people. As this fanaticism and persecution spread throughout the rest of the kingdom of Castile, there was no accountability held for the murders and sacking of the Jewish houses, and estimations say that there were 50,000 victims.

=== Violence in Valencia and Aragon ===
This religious mob spread to Aragon, as the authorities did not prevent the same pattern of plunder, murder, and fanaticism.

About 100,000 Jews in Aragon converted rather than face death or attempt to flee.

The violence next spread to Valencia, in the Crown of Aragon. On 28 June, Queen Violant of Bar ordered city officials to be especially protective of Jews. However, the situation continued to escalate and in July, Prince Martin (King John I's brother) was placed in charge of protecting Jews against persecution. Martin had gallows set up outside the Jewish area as a threat to those who would be inclined to attack Jews, extra surveillance for security, and criers proclaimed that Jews were under the crown's protection; on 6 July the Crown ordered the criers to cease.

Catholic mobs began to act on 9 July, commencing with crowds throwing stones at royal guards and, against Martin's explicit demands, began attacking Jews with improvised weapons. The mob then began to murder, mass rape, and loot. Prince Martin recorded that the mob murdered some 2,300 Jews out of a community of 2,500 and forced the 200 who survived to convert.

Archdeacon Martin declared the violence a divine judgement against the Jews; King John was present at the attack trying to prevent it. King John criticized his brother's minimal punishments for such brazen disobedience to the crown, and said that he would have had three to four hundred people killed, but now they must put the law on hold and serve punishment on their own.

Overall, around 11,000 Jews in Valencia converted rather than face death or expulsion.

== Aftermath ==
Prior to the Massacre of 1391, only isolated instances of voluntary Jewish conversion to Catholicism had occurred in the Iberian Peninsula. Some Jewish converts gained notoriety as Christian polemicists, however such cases were exceptional. The overall number of conversions remained insignificant.

After the Massacre, many more Jews began to convert to Catholicism, giving rise to a substantial Marrano population. Strong Jewish cultural, familial, and ideological ties persisted among the conversos. Rabbinic authorities, categorizing conversos as anusim or "forced ones", affirmed their continued Jewish identity despite the conversion. The prevalence of crypto-Judaism among conversos further complicated Catholic perceptions, fueling distrust and jealousy towards this group. Spaniards from traditionally Catholic families called themselves "Old Christians", further singling out conversos. The ensuing decades witnessed a crescendo of anti-converso measures and violent outbursts, culminating in the wholesale expulsion of Jews from Spain 100 years after the massacre, in 1492.

== Sephardic Jews ==
The term "Sephardic Jews" or "Sephardim" is the Jewish ethnonym for the Spanish and Portuguese Jews who were forced to convert to Catholicism or face expulsion from Spain after the Alhambra Decree. The name "Sephardic" comes from the Hebrew word for Spain: Sefarad. The vast majority of conversos remained in Spain and Portugal, and their descendants, who number in the millions, live in both of these countries. 100,000-300,000 Jews did leave Spain after 1492 (estimates vary) and settled in different parts of Europe and the Maghreb, while some migrated as far as the Indian subcontinent, the majority of whom reverted. Many settled in parts of the Ottoman Empire, including the Maghreb (where the community was known as Megorashim) and the Levant at the behest of Sultan Bayezid II. Factors both internal and external to the Sephardim culture resulted in a continuity of tradition and the presence of a substantial Sephardic population around the globe in the 21st century, including in the United States. Sephardic Jews are one of the major Jewish ethnic divisions, alongside their Ashkenazi and Mizrahi counterparts.

Historian Yoel Marciano has argued that the forced conversions contributed to the resurgence of Kabbalah studies among the Sephardim population of Spain in the early 15th century and in the diaspora following expulsion.

"Sephardic Bnei Anusim" is a modern term for the contemporary descendants of the original conversos.

== Selected sources ==
- Fotheringham, James Gainsborough (1889). "Felton, William (d.1367)" . In Stephen, Leslie (ed.). Dictionary of National Biography. Vol. 18. London: Smith, Elder & Co. p. 311.
- Freund, Scarlett; Ruiz (1994). "Jews, Conversos, and the Inquisition in Spain, 1391–1492: The Ambiguities of History". In Perry, Marvin; Schweitzer, Frederick M. (eds.). Jewish-Christian Encounters Over the Centuries: Symbiosis, Prejudice, Holocaust, Dialogue. P. Lang. pp. 169–195. ISBN 978-0-8204-2082-0.
- Gampel, Benjamin R. (2016). Anti-Jewish Riots in the Crown of Aragon and the Royal Response, 1391–1392. Cambridge: Cambridge University Press. pp. 271–314. ISBN 978-1-107-16451-2.
- Illescas Nájera, Francisco (2003). "De la convivencia al fracaso de la conversión: algunos aspectos que promovieron el racismo antijudío en la España de la Reconquista" (PDF). Revista de Humanidades: Tecnológico de Monterrey (14). Monterrey: Instituto Tecnológico y de Estudios Superiores de Monterrey: 243. ISSN 1405-4167.
- Lea, Henry Charles (1896). "Ferrand Martinez and the Massacres of 1391". The American Historical Review. 1 (2): 209–219. doi:10.1086/ahr/1.2.209. JSTOR 1833647.
- Marciano, Yoel (2019). Sages of Spain in the Eye of the Storm: Jewish Scholars of Late Medieval Spain (in Hebrew). Jerusalem: Bialik. p. 243. ISBN 978-965-536-266-4.
- Meyerson, Mark D. (2004). A Renaissance in Fifteenth-Century Spain. Princeton: Princeton University Press. pp. xx + 272. ISBN 0-691-11749-7.
- Miguel-Prendes, Sol; Sofier Irish, Maya; Wacks, David A. (2020-09-10), Miguel-Prendes, Sol; Soifer Irish, Maya; Wacks, David (eds.), Ferrán Martínez's speech at the Tribunal del Alcázar in Seville, 19 February, 1388 (English version), Humanities Commons, doi:10.17613/a5e1-cj38
- Nirenberg, David (2014). Neighboring Faiths: Christianity, Islam, and Judaism in the Middle Ages and Today. University of Chicago Press. doi:10.7208/chicago/9780226169095.001.0001. ISBN 978-0-226-16909-5. OCLC 1014217260.
- Pérez, Joseph; Hochroth, Lysa (2007). History of a tragedy: the expulsion of the Jews from Spain. Hispanisms. Urbana: University of Illinois Press. ISBN 978-0-252-03141-0. OCLC 74916076.
- Poliakov, Léon (2003-10-05). The History of Anti-Semitism, Volume 2: From Mohammed to the Marranos. University of Pennsylvania Press. pp. 156–57. ISBN 978-0-8122-1864-0.
- Prados García, Celia (2011). "La expulsión de los judíos y el retorno de los sefardíes como nacionales españoles. Un análisis histórico-jurídico". Actas del Primer Congreso Internacional sobre Migraciones en Andalucía. Nina Kressova. pp. 2119–2126. ISBN 978-84-921390-3-3.
- Ray, Jonathan Stewart (2013). After expulsion: 1492 and the making of Sephardic Jewry. New York: New York University Press. pp. 18–22. ISBN 978-0-8147-2911-3.
- Storer, Edward (1911). Peter the Cruel, the life of the notorious Don Pedro of Castile, together with an account of his relations with the famous Maria de Padlla. London: John Lane. pp. 64–86.
