= Yaron Avitov =

Israeli poet

Yaron Avitov ירון אביטוב
- Born: 1957 (age 68–69); Haifa, Israel
- Citizenship: Israeli
- Occupations: Writer, poet, anthologist, documentary filmmaker, literary critic and cultural researcher

Yaron Avitov (Hebrew: ירון אביטוב; was born in 1957 in Haifa, Israel) is a writer, poet, anthologist, documentary filmmaker, literary critic and cultural researcher. He lives now in Ecuador.

He has published novels, anthologies and collections of short stories in Hebrew, such as Observation, Note from my Mom and Homeless. His works edited in Spanish are The people of the book, Jerusalem in the Andes, One is Our God, Lights of Madrid, The Book of Peace and Birds do not sing in Auschwitz. He is a regular guest at book fairs in Latin America and his documentaries on Sephardic converts have been presented at international film festivals such as the International Jewish Film Festival in Miami. His new documentary, America Ladina tells the story of the Sephardic converts in Latin America. Among several literary awards he has received the Prime Minister of Literature Prize, the Jerusalem Fund Award, the Amos House of the Presidency Prize, the Social Sciences Award, the Misgav Jerusalem Prize granted by Hebrew University of Jerusalem, and the Hebrew Literature Ambassador in Latin America Award for his tireless work on the cultural rapprochement between Latin America and Israel.

Born in Haifa. Writer, editor, journalist and literary critic. In addition to his writing, he edited books for the book publishers Carmel, Tones and Bitan. Yaron Avitov won the A. Rupin Social Sciences Research Award in 1993 for his book 'Looking', in 1996 he won the Jerusalem Fund for Fine Literature for 'Adon Salihot' in 1998 he received a grant award from the Amos Foundation and in 2005 he won In the Prime Minister's Award for Fine Literature 5555. "Yron Avitov's writing deals with the Israeli human puzzle, and especially with the 'Zabers' who have been living in Israel for generations. He writes about the social fringes, about the rejected and outcasts, and about heroes struggling with themselves and their environment against the background of oppressive existence, and trying to survive in complicated situations. His writing deals with issues such as freedom, human dignity and the individual struggling for his identity, and it excels in great humanity and empathy for the 'other' while illuminating his mental complexity. This is the sensitive writing of a natural narrator with a sharp eye and the ability to describe situations in a clean and reliable style" (from the judges' reasons for awarding the Prime Minister's Award 2005, Prof. Yaffe Berlovitz, Eli Amir, Asher Reich)
