= Mizrahi Jews =

Jewish diaspora of Africa and Asia

יהודים מזרחים
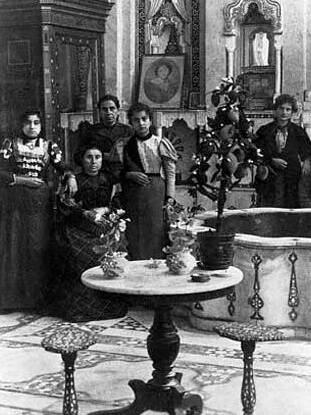
- A Jewish family from Damascus, c. 1901

Total population
- ~3 million (including 1.5 million Sephardic Jews from Morocco, Algeria, and Tunisia, who are sometimes grouped into broader 'Mizrahi' demographics)

Regions with significant populations
- Israel (incl. occupied territories): 3,200,000
- United States: 75,000

Languages
- Historic: Hebrew, Judeo-Aramaic (western, eastern varieties), Jewish Koine Greek; Traditional: Hebrew, Judaeo-Arabic, Judeo-Berber, Judaeo-Aramaic, Judaeo-Iranian (Judaeo-Persian), Syriac, Kurdish, Turkish; Modern: Israeli Hebrew, Mizrahi Hebrew (liturgical), French, English, Russian, Arabic, Georgian, Azerbaijani, Juhuri

Religion
- Judaism

Related ethnic groups
- Maghrebi Jews, Yemenite Jews, Iranian Jews, Bukharian Jews, Mountain Jews, Georgian Jews, and Samaritans; various Middle Eastern ethnic groups and Jewish groups

Mizrahi Jews (Hebrew: יהודי המִזְרָח), also known as Mizrahim (מִזְרָחִים) in plural and Mizrahi (מִזְרָחִי) in singular, and alternatively referred to as Oriental Jews or Edot HaMizrach (עֵדוֹת־הַמִּזְרָח, lit. 'Communities of the East'), are a grouping of Jewish communities that lived in the Muslim world. Mizrahi is a politico-sociological term that was coined with the creation of the State of Israel. It translates as "Easterner" in Hebrew.

The term Mizrahi is exclusively applied to descendants of Jewish communities throughout Asia, North Africa, and parts of the North Caucasus. This includes Iraqi Jews, Iranian Jews, Bukharian Jews, Kurdish Jews, Afghan Jews, Mountain Jews, Georgian Jews, and the small community of Bahraini Jews. The aforementioned groups are believed to derive their ancestry from the Babylonian captivity. Yemenite Jews are also Mizrahi Jews, although they differ from other Mizrahim, who have undergone a process of total or partial assimilation to Sephardic law and customs.

Syrian Jews, Egyptian Jews, Tunisian Jews, Moroccan Jews, Algerian Jews, and Libyan Jews (also known as Musta'arabi Jews or Maghrebi Jews) are sometimes labeled as Oriental Jews or Mizrahim, although these groups largely merged with the mass arrival of Sephardic Jews from the Iberian peninsula, following their late 15th-century expulsion from Spain and Portugal. The vast majority of Maghrebi Jews (Moroccan, Algerian, and Tunisian) are Sephardim of point of view of the religious rite. Maghrebi is an Arabic term which translates to "Westerners."

Indian Jews (specifically Cochin Jews and Bene Israel) are sometimes labeled as Mizrahi, although members of the community identify as a separate category, as South Asian.

These various Jewish communities were first officially grouped into a singular identifiable division during World War II, when they were distinctly outlined in the One Million Plan of the Jewish Agency for Israel, which detailed Jewish immigration schema to Palestine (then under the British Mandate for Palestine) after the Holocaust.

An earlier cultural community of Eastern Jewish peoples were the Sephardim. Before the establishment of the State of Israel in 1948, the ancestors of various communities now labelled "Mizrahi Jews" did not identify themselves as a distinctive Jewish subgroup, and many considered themselves Sephardim, as they largely followed the Sephardic rite of Judaism, with local variations in minhagim. The original Sephardi Jewish community was formed in Spain and Portugal, and after their expulsion in 1492, many Sephardim settled in areas where older Jewish communities already existed. This complicated ethnography has resulted in a conflation of terms, particularly in official Israeli ethnic and religious terminology, with Sephardi being used in a broad sense to include Mizrahi Jews, as well as Sephardim proper from the Levant, Italy, the Balkans, Romania, Western Europe, America, the Iberian peninsula, Turkey and northern Africa around the Mediterranean Basin. The Chief Rabbinate of Israel has placed rabbis of Mizrahi origin in Israel under the jurisdiction of the Sephardi chief rabbis, who were mostly of Oriental origin.

Following the First Arab–Israeli War, 850,000 Mizrahi and Sephardi Jews emigrated or were expelled from Central Asia, West Asia, the Caucasus, and North Africa between 1948 and the early 1980s. A 2018 statistic found that 45 percent of Jewish-Israelis self-identified as either Mizrahi or Sephardi.

== Terminology ==
Mizrahi is literally translated as 'Oriental', 'Eastern', מזרח Mizraḥ, Hebrew for 'east'. In the past, the word Mizrahim, corresponding to the Arabic word Mashriqiyyun (Arabic: مشرِقيون, 'Easterners'), referred to the natives of Turkey (partially), Iraq and other Asian countries, as distinct from those of North Africa Maghribiyyun (مغرِبيون, 'Westerners'). In medieval and early modern times, the corresponding Hebrew word ma'arav (מערב) was used for North Africa. In Talmudic and Geonic times, however, this word ma'arav referred to the land of Israel, as contrasted with Babylonia. For this reason, many object to the use of Mizrahi to include Moroccan and other North African Jews.

During the 1940s, before Israel's establishment, the demographer Roberto Bachi used the categories of "Mizrahim" and "Ashkenazim" in his ethnic classification of the Yishuv. In the 1950s, the Jews who came from the communities listed above were simply called and known as Jews (Yahud, يهود in Arabic). To distinguish them in the Jewish sub-ethnicities, Israeli officials, who themselves were mostly Eastern European Jews, transferred the name Mizrahi to them, though most of these immigrants arrived from lands located further westward than Central Europe. Mizrahi is subsequently among the surnames most often changed by Israelis, and many scholars, including Avshalom Kor, claim that the transferring of the name Mizrahim was a form of Orientalism towards the Oriental Jews, similar to the ways in which Westjuden had labeled Ostjuden as "second class" and excluded them from possible positions of power.

The usage of the term Mizrahim or Edot Hamizraḥ (עדות־המזרח), Oriental communities, grew in Israel as a result of the settlement of Jewish immigrants from Europe, North Africa, the Middle East, the Caucasus, and Central Asia, along with followers of Ashkenazi, Sephardi, and Temani (Yemenite) rites. In modern Israeli usage, it refers to all Jews from Central and West Asian countries, many of them Arabic-speaking Muslim-majority countries. The term came to be widely used by Mizrahi activists in the early 1990s. Since then in Israel it has become an accepted semi-official and media designation.

Before the establishment of the state of Israel, Mizrahi Jews did not identify themselves as a separate Jewish subgroup. Instead, they generally characterized themselves as Sephardi, as they follow the customs and traditions of Sephardi Judaism (but with some differences among the minhag "customs" of particular communities).

Sami Michael rejects the terms Mizrahim and Edot HaMizrach, claiming it is a fictitious identity advanced by Mapai to preserve a "rival" to the Ashkenazim and help them push the Mizrahim below in the social-economic ladder, so they will not ever be in line with the Israeli elites of European Jewish descent. He also speaks against the Mapai manner of labeling all the Oriental Jews as "one folk" and erasing their unique and individual history as separated communities. Instead, he wonders why the real Easterners of his time, who were the Eastern European Jewish peasants from the villages, were not labeled as "Mizrahi" in Israel, despite this term being more appropriate for them than for the Oriental Jews who were labeled that way. Michael also opposes the inclusion of Oriental Jewish communities who do not descend from Sepharadic Jews, as "Sepharadim" by Israeli politicians, calling it "historically inaccurate." He also claims that his work as an author is always referred to as "ethnic," while European Jews' work, even if historic in theme, is not, as a result of racism.

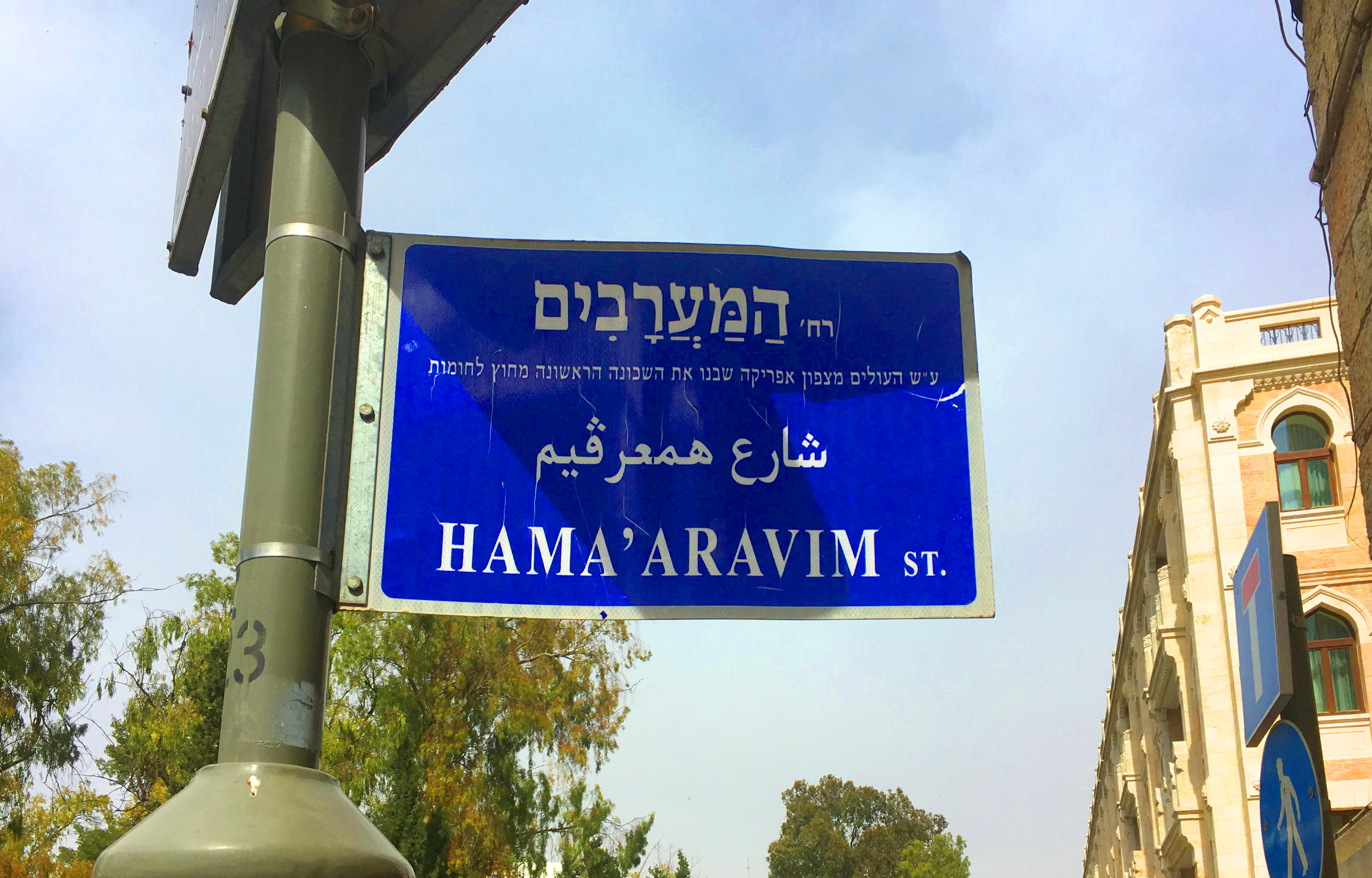
The Westerners street in Jerusalem, Israel; coined after the Maghrebi Jews

Most of the Mizrahi activists actually originated from North African Jewish communities, traditionally called "Westerners" (Maghrebi), rather than "Easterners" (Mashreqi). The Jews who emigrated to Palestine from North Africa in the 19th century and earlier started their own political and religious organization in 1860 which operated in Jerusalem and was called "The Western Jewish Diaspora Council" (Hebrew: ועד העדה המערבית בירושלים). Many Jews originating from Arab and Muslim countries today reject Mizrahi or any other umbrella description, and prefer to identify themselves by their particular country of origin, or that of their immediate ancestors, such as "Moroccan Jew," or prefer to use the old term Sephardi in its broader meaning.

== Religious rite designations ==
Today, many identify non-Ashkenazi rite Jews as Sephardi – in modern Hebrew Sfaradim – mixing ancestral origin and religious rite. This broader definition of "Sephardim" as including all, or most, Mizrahi Jews is also common in Jewish religious circles. During the past century^{[20th?]}, the Sephardi rite absorbed part of the unique rite of the Yemenite Jews, and lately Beta Israel religious leaders in Israel have also joined Sefardi rite collectivities, especially following rejection of their Jewishness by some Ashkenazi circles.

The reason for this classification of all Mizrahim under Sephardi rite is that most Mizrahi communities use much the same religious rituals as Sephardim proper for historical reasons. The prevalence of the Sephardi rite among Mizrahim is partially a result of Sephardim (in the narrow sense) joining some Mizrahi communities following the 1492 Alhambra Decree, which expelled Jews from Sepharad (Spain and Portugal). Over the last few centuries, the previously distinctive rites of the Mizrahi communities were influenced, superimposed upon, or altogether replaced by the rite of the Sephardim, which was perceived as more prestigious. Even before this assimilation, the original rite of many Jewish Oriental communities was already closer to the Sephardi rite than to the Ashkenazi one. For this reason, "Sephardim" has come to mean not only "Spanish Jews" proper but "Jews of the Spanish rite," just as "Ashkenazim" is used for "Jews of the German rite," whether or not their families originate in Germany.

Many of the Sephardi Jews exiled from Spain resettled in countries in the Arab world such as Syria and Morocco. In Syria, most eventually intermarried with, and assimilated into, the larger established communities of Musta'rabim and Mizrahim. In some North African countries, such as Morocco, Sephardi Jews came in greater numbers, and so largely contributed to the Jewish settlements that the pre-existing Jews were assimilated by the more recently arrived Sephardi Jews. Either way, this assimilation, combined with the use of the Sephardi rite, led to the popular designation and conflation of most non-Ashkenazi Jewish communities from Western Asia and North Africa as "Sephardi rite", whether or not they were descended from Spanish Jews, which is what the terms "Sephardi Jews" and "Sfaradim" properly implied when used in the ethnic as opposed to the religious sense.

In some Arabic countries, such as Egypt and Syria, Sephardi Jews arrived via the Ottoman Empire would distinguish themselves from the already established Musta'rabim, while in others, such as Morocco and Algeria, the two communities largely intermarried, with the latter embracing Sephardi customs and thus forming a single community.

== Language ==
=== Arabic ===
In the Arab world (such as Morocco, Algeria, Tunisia, Libya, Egypt, Yemen, Saudi Arabia, Jordan, Lebanon, and Syria and Iraqi Kurdistan), Mizrahim most often speak Arabic. Most of the many notable philosophical, religious, and literary works of the Jews in Spain, North Africa, and Asia were written in Arabic using a modified Hebrew alphabet.

=== Aramaic ===
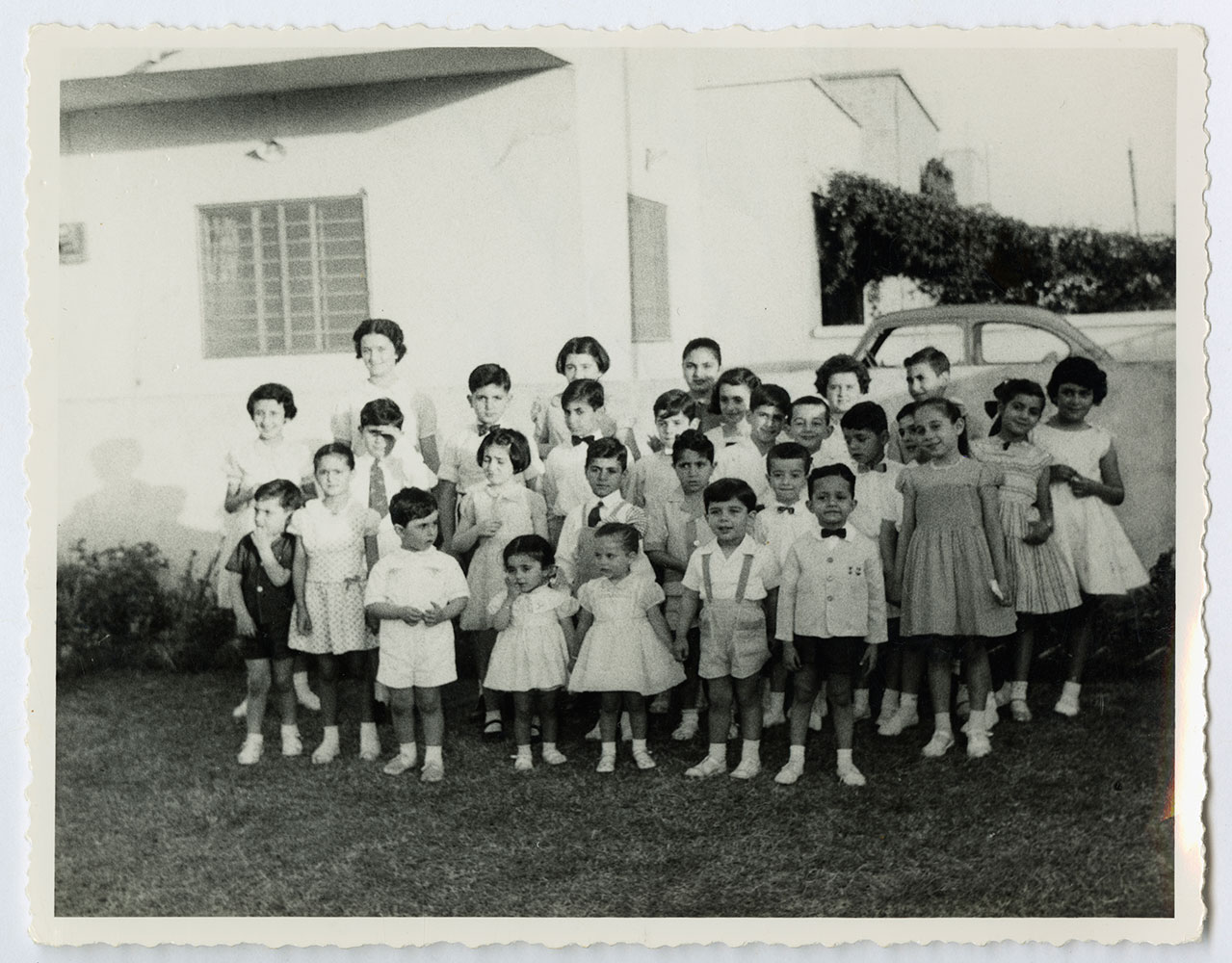
Children in a Jewish school in Baghdad, 1959

Aramaic is a Semitic language subfamily. Specific varieties of Aramaic are identified as "Jewish languages" since they are the languages of major Jewish texts such as the Talmud and Zohar, and many ritual recitations such as the Kaddish. Traditionally, Aramaic has been a language of Talmudic debate in yeshivot, as many rabbinic texts are written in a mixture of Hebrew and Aramaic. The current Hebrew alphabet, known as "Assyrian lettering" or "the square script," was in fact borrowed from Aramaic.

In Kurdistan, a region which includes parts of Turkey, Syria, Iraq and Iran, the language of the Mizrahim is a variant of Aramaic. As spoken by the Kurdish Jews, Judeo-Aramaic languages are Neo-Aramaic languages descended from Jewish Babylonian Aramaic. They are related to the Christian Aramaic dialects spoken by Assyrian people, which are Syriac Christians who claim descent from Assyria, one of the oldest civilizations in the world, dating back to 2500 BCE in ancient Mesopotamia.

=== Persian and other languages and dialects ===
Among other languages associated with Mizrahim are Judeo-Iranian languages such as Judeo-Persian, the Bukhori dialect, Judeo-Tat, and Kurdish languages; Georgian; Judeo-Marathi and Judeo-Malayalam. Bukharian Jews from various countries in Central Asia and the Mountain Jews living in Azerbaijan are also widely fluent in Russian due to several of those countries' former status as republics of the Soviet Union.

== History ==
The Jewish diaspora in West Asia outside the Land of Israel started in the 6th century BCE, during the Babylonian captivity, which also caused some Jews to flee to Egypt. Other early diaspora areas in West Asia and North Africa were Persia, Yemen and Cyrene.

As Islam started to spread in the 7th century CE, Jews who lived under Muslim rule became dhimmis. Because Jews were seen as "People of the Book", they were allowed to practice their own religion, but they had an inferior status in an Islamic society. Even though Jews in West Asia and North Africa formed strong attachments to the areas in which they lived, they were seen as a community which was clearly distinct from other communities. For example, while Musta'arabi Jews in the Arab world were influenced by the local culture, e.g. they started speaking variants of the Arabic language and ate their own versions of the same food, they did not adopt Arab identity. Instead, Jews in the Arab world saw themselves (including the ones with family background of converts) and were seen as fundamentally a part of the wider collective of the Jewish people, and they maintained their identity as the descendants of the ancient Israelite tribes.

Some Mizrahim migrated to India, Central Asia, and the Caucasus.

Israeli historian Benny Morris wrote that "the experience of discrimination and persecution in the Arab world, and the centuries of subjection and humiliation that preceded 1948 ... [left] a deep dislike, indeed hatred, of that world among [first generation Mizrahim] and their descendants."

=== Post-1948 dispersal ===
After the establishment of the State of Israel and subsequent 1948 Arab–Israeli War, most Mizrahim were either expelled by their Arab rulers or chose to leave and emigrated to Israel. According to the 2009 Statistical Abstract of Israel by Israel Central Bureau of Statistics; 2,043.8 thousand Israeli Jews were Israel-born (father born in Israel), 681.4 thousand were from other Asian countries (including 95.6 thousand from India and Pakistan), 859.1 thousand were from African countries (including 106.9 thousand from Ethiopia), and 1,939.4 thousand were from Europe, America or Oceania.

Anti-Jewish actions by Arab governments in the 1950s and 1960s, in the context of the founding of the State of Israel, led to the departure of large numbers of Mizrahi Jews from the Middle East and North Africa. The exodus of 25,000 Mizrahi Jews from Egypt after the 1956 Suez Crisis led to the overwhelming majority of Mizrahim leaving Arab countries. They became refugees. Most went to Israel. Many Moroccan and Algerian Jews went to France. Thousands of Lebanese, Syrian and Egyptian Jews emigrated to the United States, Brazil, Argentina, Mexico and other countries in the Americas.

Today, as many as 40,000 Mizrahim still remain in communities scattered throughout the non-Arab Muslim world, primarily in Iran, but also Uzbekistan, Azerbaijan, and Turkey. There are few Maghrebim remaining in the Arab world. About 3,000 remain in Morocco and 1,100 in Tunisia. Other countries with remnants of ancient Jewish communities with official recognition, such as Lebanon, have 100 or fewer Jews. A trickle of emigration continues, mainly to Israel and the United States.

== Absorption into Israeli society ==
Refuge in Israel was not without its tragedies: "In a generation or two, millennia of rooted Oriental civilization, unified even in its diversity", had been wiped out, writes Mizrahi scholar Ella Shohat. The trauma of rupture from their countries of origin was further complicated by the difficulty of the transition upon arrival in Israel; Mizrahi immigrants and refugees were placed in rudimentary and hastily erected tent cities (ma'abarot) often in development towns on the peripheries of Israel. Settlement in moshavim (cooperative farming villages) was only partially successful, because Mizrahim had historically filled a niche as craftsmen and merchants and most did not traditionally engage in farmwork. As the majority left their property behind in their home countries as they journeyed to Israel, many suffered a severe decrease in their socio-economic status aggravated by their cultural and political differences with the dominant Ashkenazi community. Furthermore, a policy of austerity was enforced at that time due to economic hardships.

Mizrahi immigrants arrived speaking many languages:

- many, especially those from North Africa and the Fertile Crescent, spoke Arabic dialects;
- those from Iran spoke Persian and various Judeo-Iranian languages;
- Mountain Jews from Azerbaijan and Dagestan spoke Judeo-Tat;
- Bukharian Jews from various countries in Central Asia (primarily Uzbekistan) spoke the Bukhori dialect.

Mizrahim from elsewhere brought Georgian, Judaeo-Georgian and various other languages with them. Hebrew had historically been a language only of prayer for most Jews not living in Israel, including the Mizrahim. Thus, with their arrival in Israel, the Mizrahim retained culture, customs and language distinct from their Ashkenazi counterparts. The collective estimate for Mizrahim (circa 2018) is at 4,000,000.

=== Disparities and integration ===
The cultural differences between Mizrahi and Ashkenazi Jews impacted the degree and rate of assimilation into Israeli society, and sometimes the divide between Eastern European and Middle Eastern Jews was quite sharp. Segregation, especially in the area of housing, limited integration possibilities over the years. Intermarriage between Ashkenazim and Mizrahim is increasingly common in Israel and by the late 1990s 28% of all Israeli children had multi-ethnic parents (up from 14% in the 1950s). It has been claimed that intermarriage does not tend to decrease ethnic differences in socio-economic status, however, that does not apply to the children of inter-ethnic marriages.

Although social integration has increased, disparities persist. According to a study conducted by the Israeli Central Bureau of Statistics (ICBS), Mizrahi Jews are less likely to pursue academic studies than Ashkenazi Jews. On the other side, Israeli-born Ashkenazim are up to twice as likely to study in a university as Israeli-born Mizrahim. Furthermore, the percentage of Mizrahim who seek a university education remains low compared to second-generation immigrant groups of Ashkenazi origin, such as Russians. According to a survey by the Adva Center, the average income of Ashkenazim was 36 percent higher than that of Mizrahim in 2004.

In 2023, journalist Shany Littman argued the dynamics of inequality had reversed, with most Israeli cabinet ministers and city mayors being Mizrahi Jews. She also stated that middle-class Mizrahi women earned more than their Ashkenazi counterparts.

The A-WA song "Hana Mash Hu Al Yaman" highlights the discrimination of Mizrahim, especially Yemenite Jews, faced in the 1940s, when they entered Israel as refugees. The song's lyrics depict a reality of cultural assimilation, low income jobs, and a pressure to leave their Yemeni traditions behind.

=== Memorial ===
In 2021, a memorial was erected in Jerusalem to commemorate the departure and expulsion of Sephardi and Mizrahi Jews from Arab countries and Iran, after a 2014 law passed by the Knesset marking November 30 the Day to Mark the Departure and Expulsion of Jews from the Arab Countries and Iran.

== Genetics ==
The Middle Eastern Jewish populations have a connection to the Jewish communities of Europe and North Africa in their paternal gene pool, suggesting a common Middle Eastern origin between them.

In autosomal analyses, the Iraqi Jews, Iranian Jews, Bukharian Jews, Kurdish Jews, Mountain Jews, and Georgian Jews form a close genetic cluster. When examined at a more detailed level, the groups can be separated from each other. This cluster plots between Levantine and Northern West Asian populations. Syrian and North African Jews are separate from it and closer to the Sephardi Jews. Yemenite Jews are distinct from other Jewish groups and cluster with the non-Jewish population of the Arabian Peninsula (although connection has been established between them and other Jewish diaspora communities).

== See also ==
- Adeni Jews
- Arab Jews
- Arab–Israeli conflict
- Berber Jews
- Eastern Sephardim
- Hebrews, a term which is used as a synonym for the terms "Israelites" and "Jews"
- Jewish culture
- Jewish ethnic divisions
- North African Sephardim
- Palestinian Jews
- Spanish and Portuguese Jews
- Gerim
