= New Christian =

Social and legal category in early modern Iberia

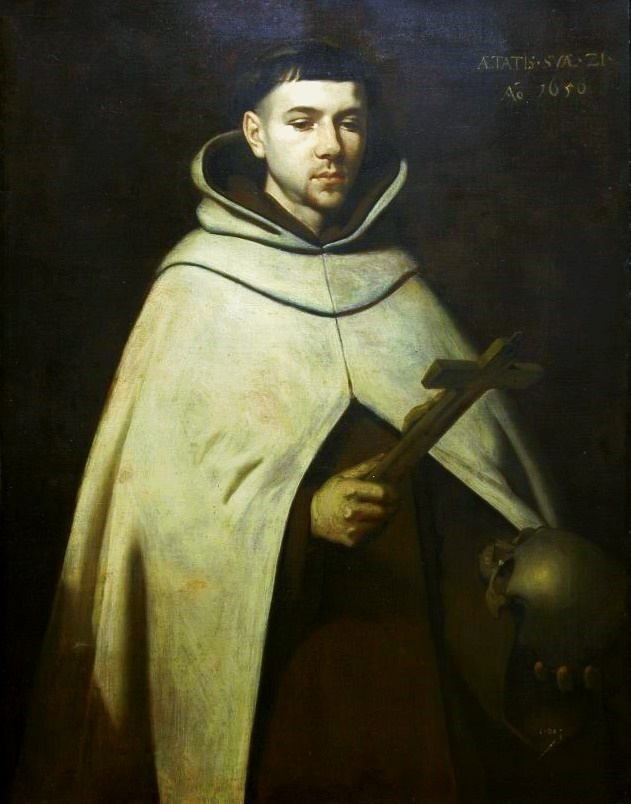
St. John of the Cross (1542–1591), a notable Carmelite friar, Christian mystic, and New Christian of Converso ancestry

New Christian (Latin: Novus Christianus; Spanish: Cristiano Nuevo; Portuguese: Cristão-Novo; Catalan: Cristià Nou; Ladino: Kristiano Muevo; Arabic: المسيحيون الجدد) was a socio-religious designation and legal distinction referring to the population of former Jewish and Muslim converts to Christianity in the Spanish and Portuguese empires, and their respective colonies in the New World. The term was used from the 15th century onwards primarily to describe the descendants of the Sephardic Jews and Andalusian Muslims that were baptized into the Catholic Church following the Alhambra Decree of 1492. The Alhambra Decree, also known as the Edict of Expulsion, was an anti-Jewish law made by the Catholic Monarchs upon the Christian Reconquista of the Iberian Peninsula. It required both Jews and Muslims to convert to Roman Catholicism or be expelled from Spain and Portugal. Most of the history of the "New Christians" refers to the Jewish converts, who were generally known as Conversos (or in a more derogatory fashion Marranos), while the Muslim converts were called Moriscos.

Because these conversions were achieved in part through coercion and also with the threat of expulsion, especially when it came to the Jews, the Catholic Inquisition and Iberian monarchs suspected a number of the "New Christians" of being crypto-Jews. Subsequently, the Spanish Inquisition first and then the Portuguese Inquisition was created to enforce Catholic orthodoxy and to investigate allegations of heresy. This became a political issue in the kingdoms of the Portuguese–Spanish Union itself, and their respective empires abroad, particularly in Spanish America, Portuguese America, and the Caribbean. Sometimes "New Christians" travelled to territories controlled by Protestant enemies of Spain, such as the Dutch Empire, the early English Empire, or Huguenot-influenced areas of the Kingdom of France such as Bordeaux, and openly practiced Judaism, which furthered suspicion of Jewish crypsis. Nevertheless, a significant number of those "New Christians" of Converso ancestry were deemed by Spanish society as sincerely Catholic and they still managed to attain prominence, whether religious (St. John of the Cross, St. Teresa of Ávila, St. John of Ávila, St. Joseph of Anchieta, Tomás Luis de Victoria, Tomás de Torquemada, Diego Laynez, Francisco de Vitoria, Francisco Suárez, and others) or political (Juan de Oñate, Luis de Carvajal y de la Cueva, Hernán Pérez de Quesada, Luis de Santángel, and others).

According to António José Saraiva, a Portuguese historian and professor of Portuguese literature, "When Ferdinand of Aragon (1452–1516) and Isabella of Castile (1451–1504) married in 1469 they ascended the throne of a united and almost wholly reconquered Spain. Among their roughly 7,000,000 subjects, some 150,000 were remote descendants of converted Jews, known as New Christians, Conversos or, pejoratively, Marranos; a still sizeable minority estimated at 90,000 were Jews and another estimated 150,000 Muslims. Between the New Christian bourgeoisie of recent vintage and the old Jewish bourgeoisie there was intense rivalry. In fact, the most energetic and relentless anti-Jewish propagandists were New Christians." By law, the category of New Christians included recent converts and their known baptized descendants with any fraction New Christian blood up to the third generation, the fourth generation being exempted. In Phillip II's reign, it included any person with any fraction of New Christian blood "from time immemorial". In Portugal, in 1772, Sebastião José de Carvalho e Melo, 1st Marquess of Pombal decreed an end to the legal distinction between New Christians and Old Christians.

== New Christian as a legal category ==
Although the category of New Christian is meaningless in Christian theology and ecclesiology, it was introduced by the Old Christians who claimed that "pure unmixed" Christian bloodlines (Limpieza de sangre) distinguish them as a unique group, separated from ethnic Jews and Iberian Muslims.

The Old Christians wanted to legally and socially distinguish themselves from the Conversos (new converts to Christianity), whom they considered being tainted by their non-Spanish bloodlines—even though the overwhelming majority of Spain's Muslims were also indigenous Iberians, descendants of native Iberians who earlier converted to Islam under Muslim rule.

In practice, for the New Christians of Jewish origins, the concept of New Christian was a legal mechanism and manifestation of racial antisemitism, rather than Judaism as a religion, while for those of Moorish origins it was a manifestation of racial anti-Berberism and/or anti-Arabism. Portuguese New Christians were alleged to have been partners with an English factor in Italy, as reported in a notable 17th-century marine insurance swindle.

=== Cleanliness of blood and related concepts ===
The related Spanish development of an ideology of limpieza de sangre ("cleanliness of blood") also excluded New Christians from society—universities, emigration to the New World, many professions—regardless of their sincerity as converts.

Other derogatory terms applied to each of the converting groups included marranos (i.e. "pigs") for New Christians of Jewish origin, and moriscos (a term which carried pejorative connotations) for New Christians of Andalusian origin.

== Discrimination and persecution ==
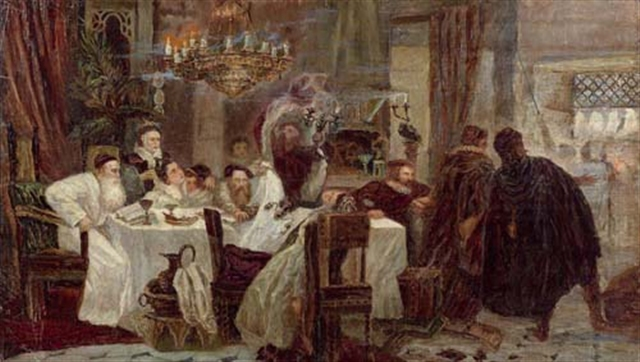
Marranos: A secret Passover Seder in Spain during the times of Inquisition, an 1893 painting by Moshe Maimon

Aside from social stigma and ostracism, the consequences of legal or social categorization as a New Christian included restrictions of civil and political rights, abuses of those already-limited civil rights, social and sometimes legal restrictions on whom one could marry (anti-miscegenation laws), social restrictions on where one could live, legal restrictions of entry into the professions and the clergy, legal restrictions and prohibition of immigration to and settlement in the newly colonized Spanish territories in the Americas, deportation from the colonies.

In addition to the above restrictions and discrimination endured by New Christians, the Spanish Crown and Church authorities also subjected New Christians to persecution, prosecution, and capital punishment for actual or alleged practice of the family's former religion. After the Alhambra Decree of the expulsion of the Jewish population from Spain in 1492 and a similar Portuguese decree in 1497, the remaining Jewish population in Iberia became officially Christian by default. The New Christians, especially those of Jewish origin, were always under suspicion of being judaizantes ("judaizers"); that is, apostatizing from the Christian religion and being active crypto-Jews.

== Emigration ==
=== Jewish "New Christian" emigration ===
Despite the discrimination and legal restrictions, many Jewish-origin New Christians found ways of circumventing these restrictions for emigration and settlement in the Iberian colonies of the New World by falsifying or buying limpieza de sangre ("cleanliness of blood") documentation or attaining perjured affidavit attesting to untainted Old Christian pedigrees. The descendants of these, who could not return to Judaism, became the modern-day Christian-professing Sephardic Bnei Anusim of Latin America.

Also as a result of the unceasing trials and persecutions by the Spanish and Portuguese Inquisition, other Jewish-origin New Christians opted to migrate out of the Iberian Peninsula in a continuous flow between the 1600s to 1800s towards Amsterdam, and also London, whereupon in their new tolerant environment of refuge outside the Iberian cultural sphere they eventually returned to Judaism. The descendants of these became the Spanish and Portuguese Jews.

=== Muslim "New Christian" emigration ===
Although Iberian Muslims were protected in the treaty signed at the fall of Granada, and the New Christian descendants of former Muslims weren't expelled until over a century later. Even so, in the meantime, different waves of Andalusian Muslims and New Christians of Moorish origin left the Iberian Peninsula and settled across North Africa and in the provinces of the Ottoman Empire.

== History of New Christian conversions ==
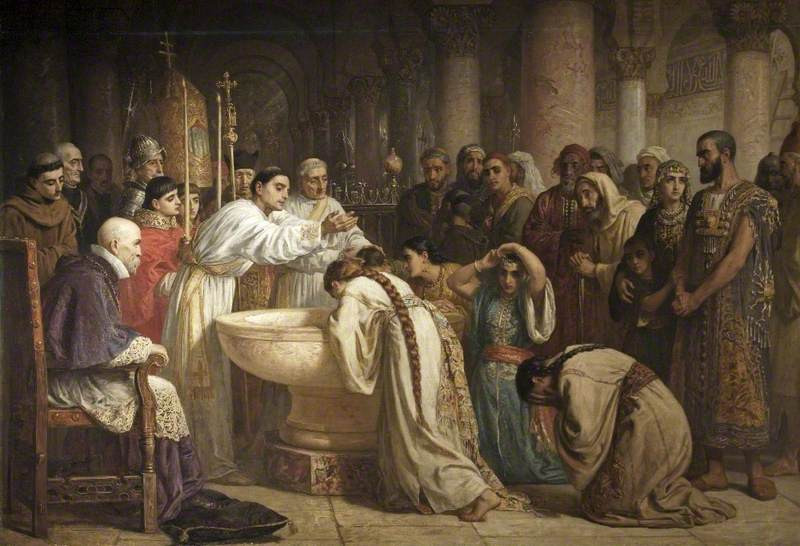
The Moorish Proselytes of Archbishop Ximenes, Granada, 1500, by Edwin Long (1829–1891), depicting a mass baptism of former Muslims in the city of Granada, Spain

Over a hundred thousand Iberian Jews converted to Catholicism in Spain as a result of pogroms in 1391. Those remaining practicing Jews were expelled by the Catholic monarchs Ferdinand and Isabella in the Alhambra Decree in 1492, following the Christian Reconquista of the Iberian Peninsula. As a result of the Alhambra Decree and persecution in prior years, over 200,000 Jews converted to Catholicism and between 40,000 and 100,000 were expelled. Following the Reconquista, 200,000 of the 500,000 Muslims had been converted to Christianity. There is no universally agreed figure of Moorish population, but Christiane Stallaert put the number at around one million Moriscos (New Christians and their descendants) at the beginning of the 16th century.

== Catholic Inquisition ==
The governments of Spain and Portugal created the Spanish Inquisition in 1478 and the Portuguese Inquisition, including the Goa Inquisition, in 1536 as a way of dealing with social tensions, supposedly justified by the need to fight heresy. Communities believed correctly that many New Christians were secretly practising their former religions to any extent possible, becoming crypto-Jews and crypto-Muslims.

== See also ==
- Apostasy in Christianity
- Apostasy in Islam
- Apostasy in Judaism
  - Baal teshuva
  - Jewish outreach
  - Jewish schisms
  - Proselytization and counter-proselytization of Jews
- Black Propaganda against Portugal and Spain
- Converso
- Crypto-Islam
  - Taqiyya
- Crypto-Judaism
  - Sabbateanism
    - Dönmeh
    - Frankism
  - Sephardic Bnei Anusim
- Heresy in Christianity
  - Limpieza de sangre
  - Marrano
  - Morisco
- Jewish assimilation
- Jewish emancipation
  - Aliyah
  - Homeland for the Jewish people
  - Napoleon and the Jews
  - Ottoman–Jewish millet
- Jewish identity
  - Israelites
  - Jewish peoplehood
  - Twelve Tribes of Israel
- Old Christian
- "Who is a Jew?"
  - Matrilineality in Judaism
  - Patrilineality in Judaism
