= Zera Yisrael =

Blood descendants of Jews

Zera Yisrael (Hebrew: זרע ישראל, lit. 'Seed [of] Israel') is a legal category in Halakha that denotes recent genetic descendants of Jews, who are not legally Jewish according to religious criteria. This is due to a break in matrilineal Jewish ancestry.

== Who is Zera Yisrael ==
=== Patrilineal Jews ===
Traditionally, Rabbinic Judaism has understood Jewishness to be passed down matrilineally. Although contemporary denominations have varying precedents regarding lineal descent, Orthodox and Conservative Judaism maintain that only those born from a Jewish mother are considered to be Jewish by birth. Because of this, those born to a Jewish father and a gentile mother are considered to be Zera Yisrael by religiously conservative sects of Judaism, though they may be considered Jewish by religiously liberal sects such as Reform Judaism if they were raised Jewish and identify as such.

Although Rabbinic Judaism follows matrilineal lines to determine an individual's Jewish legal status, evidence suggests that this shift occurred during the second century and that pre-diaspora Judaism was patrilineal. Some small and formerly isolated ethnic groups of Jews, such as the Kaifeng Jews and Beta Israel, have traditionally practiced a patrilineal form of Judaism. While many have assimilated into the mainstream matrilinealism of Rabbinic Judaism, the Karaite movement of Judaism continues to reject maternal lines in favor of paternal ones. Individuals from these circles may also be considered patrilineal Jews or Zera Yisrael if they fail to prove an unbroken maternal chain.

=== Bnei Anusim ===
Bnei Anusim (lit. 'children [of the] forced ones') is a Hebrew term referring to the descendants of Jews who were forced to conceal their Jewish identity or convert to a different religion. While broadly referring to anyone with such lineage, it specifically pertains to the Sephardic Bnei Anusim and has developed conceptually alongside a movement for the descendants of conversos and crypto-Jews to reconnect with their Jewish ancestry. Other groups, such those descended from the Jews of the Soviet Union, may be considered halakhically similar to the Bnei Anusim.

== Religious significance ==
=== Mysticism ===
Zera Yisrael have often been ascribed a distinct level of spiritual significance in Judaism, mostly within the realm of Kabbalistic thought. Rabbi Shmuly Yanklowitz, Rabbi Chaim Amsellem, and Rav Azriel Hildesheimer teach that those with undiscovered Jewish ancestry have a natural affinity for the religion, and that reconnecting with their Jewish heritage serves as a method of redeeming the holy Lurianic sparks that have fallen into the material world. They are said to have Jewish-adjacent souls already, and contribute to the fulfillment of the ingathering of the exiles.

Chassidic rabbi Zadok HaKohen wrote in his work Resisei Layla that "the root of the soul of the seed of Israel can never be upended". According to him, Isaiah was talking about Zera Yisrael when he spoke of the "lost ones" prophesized to join the Jewish people. This idea has been referenced frequently among contemporary Jewish theologians who tackle the topic of Zera Yisrael and descendants of Jews.

=== Conversion efforts ===
Because of the unique status of Zera Yisrael in Jewish theology, as well as their growing prominence in Israel, some rabbis (such as Isser Yehuda Unterman, Chaim Ozer Grodzinski, David Tzvi Hoffman, Benzion Uziel, and Chaim Amsalem) have suggested adopting more lenient policies that allow people descended from Jews to convert with only a basic understanding and acceptance of Jewish law. In addition to securing an unambiguous religious status as Jewish, a conversion accepted by the Israeli government would also serve the pragmatic purposes of allowing the converts protections under Israeli law, such as marriage rights.

Despite criticism from opponents, there have been cases of pro forma conversions for Zera Yisrael, as well as rabbinical authorities declaring groups of them halakhically Jewish. An alternative suggestion has been to convert gentile mothers of Zera Yisrael children, so as to "keep the children in the Jewish fold."

== See also ==
- Anusim
- Crypto-Judaism
- Ten Lost Tribes
- Who is a Jew?
- Jewish adjacent
- Law of Return
