= Sephardic Bnei Anusim =

Christian descendants of 15th-century Sephardi Jews

Sephardic Bnei Anusim (Hebrew: בני אנוסים ספרדיים, Hebrew pronunciation: [ˈbne anuˈsim sfaraˈdijim], lit. "Children [of the] coerced [converted] Spanish [Jews]) is a modern term which is used to define the contemporary Christian descendants of an estimated 250,000 Sephardic Jews who were coerced or forced to convert to Catholicism during the 14th and 15th centuries in Spain and Portugal. The majority of Conversos remained in Spain and Portugal, and their descendants, who today number in the millions, live in both countries. Conversos who emigrated chose destinations wherein Sephardic communities already existed, particularly in the Ottoman Empire and the Maghreb (Morocco, Algeria, and Tunisia). Some emigrated to cities in Europe, where many immediately reverted to Judaism. In theory, very few Conversos would have traveled to Latin America with colonial expeditions, because only those Spaniards who could certify that they had no recent Muslim or Jewish ancestry were allowed to travel to the New World. Recent genetic studies suggest that the arrival of the Sephardic ancestors of Latin American populations coincided with the initial colonization of Latin America, which suggests that significant numbers of recent converts were able to travel to the Americas and contribute to the gene pool of modern Latin American populations (despite an official prohibition). In addition, later arriving Iberian immigrants would have themselves contributed Converso ancestry in some parts of Latin America.

The Bnei Anusim concept has gained some popularity in the Hispanic community in the American South West as well as in countries in Latin America. Thousands of Hispanics have expressed the belief that they are the descendants of Conversos and some have expressed their desire to return to Judaism. Such a desire may probably be understood within the complex identity politics of both Latin and Anglo-America, and their interplay with social mobility. Belief in said identity is normally based on memories of family practices which may resemble perceptions or understandings of Jewish customs and religion. In addition, some have conducted internet genealogical research and have studied publicly available population genetics and atDNA analysis, leading them to their conclusions.

Since the early 21st century, a growing number "of [Sephardic] Bnei Anusim have been established in Brazil, Colombia, Costa Rica, Chile, Ecuador, Mexico, the Dominican Republic, Venezuela, and in Sefarad (Iberia) itself" as "organized groups." Some members of these communities have formally reverted to Judaism, and they have become functional communities of public Judaizers.

Although reversion to Judaism among these communities is largely a question of individual belief and interest because any knowledge of Jewish ancestry has generally been long lost over the past four centuries, two specific exceptions exist: The Xueta community of the island of Majorca in Spain and the Marrano community of Belmonte in Portugal. Both communities have practiced endogamy over generations, thus maintaining awareness of their Jewish heritage. In the case of the Xueta, they also suffered social stigma and discrimination well into the 20th century for their converso origin.

The Jewish Agency for Israel estimates the Sephardic Bnei Anusim population to number in the millions.

== Status ==
=== Halakha ===
Under Jewish religious law, also known as halakha, the Jewish status of Sephardic Bnei Anusim as a collective group is not automatically recognized by most religious authorities, for two reasons. Firstly, because of issues regarding generational distance, and secondly, because of issues relating to proving an unbroken direct maternal Jewish lineage, which is required for Orthodox recognition. However, there is a path of "return" for individuals, written about in a letter by HaRav Mordechau Eliahu in 1995, and an official "return certificate" he created that has been in use.

In regards to the first issue, many generations have passed since the coerced conversions of the anusim forebears of the Sephardic Bnei Anusim. Depending on Jewish legal rulings being followed, the maximum generational distance for acceptance as Jews (without the requirement of formal reversion/conversion) is between 3 and 5 generations from the anusim forebear/s who was/were forced to convert from Judaism to Catholicism.

In regards to the second issue, in Rabbinic Judaism, a person's Jewish status is determined in one of two ways:

- a Jew by conversion, if he/she has personally gone through a formal conversion to Judaism, or
- a natural-born Jew, if he/she was born from an unbroken direct maternal Jewish lineage which is
  - a Jewish lineage ab initio ("from the beginning", from time immemorial descending from an Israelite-era Hebrew woman), or
  - a Jewish lineage established by a female ancestor's formal conversion to Judaism whose unbroken direct Jewish maternal lineage descendants encompasses only the children born to her after her conversion (and the direct maternal-line descendants of only her post-conversion children).

Also lately, for returnees, appearing before a Beit Din to establish the evidences for the mother's female line of secretly Jewish ancestors.

Thus, natural-born Jewish status of a child (male or female) comes from its mother, via its maternal direct line of ancestry. As a consequence of the number of generations that have passed since the forced conversion of the Anusim ancestors of the Sephardic Bnei Anusim, the likelihood of a broken direct maternal Jewish lineage in that time (or the difficulty in producing documentary evidence proving otherwise) precludes the establishment of natural-born Jewishness for the majority of Bnei Anusim. If the direct maternal lineage of a Sephardic Ben Anusim is not Jewish or cannot be proven to be Jewish (due to a lack of documentary evidence to that effect), it is irrelevant whether some or all other lineages of that Sephardic Ben Anusim are confirmed Jewish lineages (be it the direct paternal lineage, all other paternal lineages, or all other maternal lineages). Therefore, a person who can *prove* their mother's Jewish lineage will be given by a Beit Din a letter simply stating that they were born Jewish. But for those who have strong evidences of the mother's female Jewish lineage (going back at least 4 generations) - and who have studied to learn the basics of Jewish Law - they can be given a "return certificate" (giyur l'chumra) like what was done for the Ethiopians and others not of the Bnei Anousim.

Halakhically non-Jewish status from the mother, however, does not preclude Sephardic Bnei Anusim from being classed as Zera Yisrael, since they are otherwise of Jewish ancestry. On that basis, some individual Sephardic Bnei Anusim have begun formally returning to Judaism by following a formal process of conversion, and thus "regaining" their status as individual Jews.

At least one Israeli Chief Rabbi has ruled that Sephardic Bnei Anusim should be considered Jewish for all purposes, but this is not the consensus. He says that a symbolic ceremony denoting reversion/conversion is necessary only in the event of a marriage in which a Sephardic Bnei Anusim origin is not shared by both spouses (i.e. a marriage between a spouse of Sephardic Bnei Anusim origin with a Jew of another community origin.). This pro-forma conversion for the purpose of marriage is solely to remove any doubt relating to any possibility of a broken maternal lineage (which religiously might affect the status of offspring borne to that marriage). It does not imply that the Sephardic Bnei Anusim are otherwise of Jewish ancestry.

=== Zera Yisrael ===
Although not halakhically Jewish as a collective group, Sephardic Bnei Anusim are broadly categorized as Zera Yisrael (זרע ישראל, literally "Seed of Israel"). Zera Yisrael are the Halakhically non-Jewish descendants of Jews who, for practical purposes, are neither completely Jewish nor completely gentile.

According to some of the most prominent medieval Jewish sages, the designation of Zera Yisrael means that although these persons are not halakhically Jewish, they nevertheless embody "the holiness of Israel."

== History ==
=== Relation to other Sephardi communities ===
The term Sephardi means "Spanish" or "Hispanic" and is derived from Sepharad, a biblical location. The location of the biblical Sepharad is disputed, but later Jews identified the Sepharad as Hispania, that is, the Iberian Peninsula, which includes Portugal. Sepharad still means "Spain" in modern Hebrew.

The common feature among Western Sephardim, Sephardic Bnei Anusim, and Neo-Western Sephardim is that all three are descended in part from conversos. "Western Sephardim" are descendants of ex-conversos from earlier centuries; "Sephardic Bnei Anusim" are nominally Christian descendants of conversos, or secret Jews; and "Neo-Western Sephardim" refers to individuals among the Sephardic Bnei Anusim population who are converting to Judaism in order to return to the origin of some of their ancestors.

The distinguishing factor between "Western Sephardim" and the nascent "Neo-Western Sephardim" is the time frame of the reversions to Judaism (in the present day, usually formal conversions, or reversions, are required because of the time from the original force conversion), the location of the reversions, and the religious and legal circumstances surrounding their reversions (including impediments and persecutions). The converso descendants who became the Western Sephardim had reverted to Judaism between the 16th and 18th centuries. They did so after migrating out of the Iberian cultural sphere and before the abolition of the Inquisition in the 19th century. Conversely, the converso descendants who are today becoming the Neo-Western Sephardim have been reverting to Judaism since the late 20th and early 21st centuries. Because the Inquisition had been abolished, these later converts did not have to leave the Iberian cultural sphere.

=== Differentiating Anusim and Bnei Anusim ===
The Sephardic Anusim ("forced [converts]") were the Jewish conversos to Catholicism and their second and third, fourth, and up to fifth generation converso descendants (the maximum acceptable generational distance depended on the particular Jewish responsa being followed by the receiving Jewish community).

The Sephardic Bnei Anusim ("[later] children [of the] coerced [converts]"), on the other hand, were any subsequent generations of descendants of the Sephardic Anusim, living anywhere in the world. These descendants, the Sephardic Bnei Ansuim, have remained hidden mainly in Iberia and Ibero-America - but they also live today all over European countries, Scandinavia, Italy, Sicily, Sardinia, Malta, the Balkans, the Middle East countries, North African Countries, Australia, New Zealand, Philippines and Indonesia. Their ancestors were subject to the Spanish and Portuguese Inquisitions in the Iberian Peninsula and its Inquisition franchises exported to the New World, and would have been persecuted as Jews. However, intermarriage and other generations of practice also meant that many descendants began to live as assimilated Christians in a Latin world. The converso descendants of Sephardic Anusim in the Hispanosphere became the Sephardic Bnei Anusim.

Conversely, those Sephardic Anusim who migrated to other countries (such as the Netherlands and Italy, among other places) tended to revert to Judaism. However, many still live as secret Jews to this day. They have since been classified as the Western Sephardim.

At least some Sephardic Anusim in the Hispanosphere (both in Iberia and their colonies in Ibero-America) had tried to maintain crypto-Jewish practices in privacy. Those who migrated to Ibero-America, especially, had initially also tried to revert to Judaism outright. Such choice was not feasible long-term in that Hispanic environment, as Judaizing conversos in Iberia and Ibero-America were subject to being persecuted, prosecuted, and liable to conviction and execution under the Inquisition. The Inquisition was not formally disbanded until the 19th century. The last known auto de fe (burning at the stake) was executed in Mexico City in 1820. But Crypto-Judaism (Secret Judaism) continued to survive into the present day. In the early 20th century, there was a move to encourage the secret Jews of Portugal to come out of hiding (by a man named Barros Basto, called the Portuguese Dreyfus). But then they saw what was happening to the Jews from the Nazis, so they continued to remain in hiding.

=== Past and present customs and practices ===
Among descendants of Sephardic Bnei Anusim, some maintained crypto-Judaism. Today, people in Spain, Portugal, and throughout Latin America (and other countries where they had migrated) have recognized that they retain familial customs of Jewish origins, and we know this because of publicity about research and DNA analysis showing Jewish ancestry.

The specifics and origin of these practices within families are sometimes no longer known, or were only passed down in portions of the family, and then, at times, the knowledge of the origin of the customs is vague. In some families, Jewish customs and traditions were passed down mainly by the women, but not the Jewish identity of the ancestors (to keep the children protected). The Jewish identity (knowledge of the Jewishness of ancestors) was passed down along the male line. And in practically all of these families, the children were taught a great fear of outsiders to the family. And that no one outside the family could be trusted. This is one of the most common themes of Crypto-Judaism. This has somewhat impaired those helping people with such fears, except when the helpers are from the same ancestry. Some of these communities in Iberia and throughout Latin America have only recently (in the late 20th century) begun to acknowledge their family's Jewish practices.

Groups of Bnei Anusim in Latin America and Iberia congregate and associate as functional communities of Judaizers. Such practice was particularly persecuted under the Spanish and Portuguese inquisitions, which were finally abolished in the 19th century. Under the Inquisition, the penalty for "Judaizing" by Jewish converts to Christianity (and their Christian-born descendants) was usually death by burning.

Members of modern-day organized groups of Sephardic Bnei Anusim who have openly and publicly come back to the faith and traditions of their ancestors have either formally converted or made a formal "return" through Beit Din. The Israeli government called these groups "emerging communities" in a report published in 2017 by the Ministry of Diaspora Affairs (based on research done by a committee, also under the Ministry of Diaspora Affairs between 2015 and 2017).

=== Old and New World inquisitions and migrations ===
The Spanish and Portuguese Inquisitions in the Iberian Peninsula, their persecution of New Christians of Jewish origin, and the virulent racial anti-Semitism are well known. The traditional Jewish holiday of Purim was celebrated disguised as the feast day of a fictional Christian saint, the "Festival of Santa Esterica"—based on the story of Queen Esther in Persia. Other Jewish festivals were also celebrated in hiding and disguised as something else.

However, the Spanish Inquisition branches in the Americas were established initially due to the complaints made by Spanish conquerors and settlers of Old Christian backgrounds to the Crown. They had noticed a significant illegal influx of New Christians of Sephardi origin into their colonies, many coming in via the Portuguese colony of Brazil.

Only Spaniards of Old Christian backgrounds were legally allowed passage into the Spanish colonies as conquistadors and settlers. Many Spanish "New Christians" (secret Jews) falsified their pedigree documents, or obtained perjured witness statements attesting pureza de sangre (purity of blood) from other New Christians who had entered the colonies and built up "Old Christian" identities. Others evaded the screening process through influence from family, friends, community connections, and acquaintances who were already passing as Old Christians. Some immigrants became members of ships' crews and assistants of conquistadors, lowly positions that did not require evidence of "pureza de sangre". (Later, even persons seeking these positions were more closely scrutinized.) There was a land grant given by the Spanish King for the areas in Mexico known as Nuevo Reino de Leon (the New Kingdom of Leon), which specified that the people did not have to have pure Christian blood. Today, the city of Monterrey, Mexico (in this region of Nuevo Leon) has many descendants of the Secret Jews living there.

On the other hand, Portuguese New Christians settled in the Portuguese colonies (like the Azores Islands, Madeira, and São Tomé) and later migrated to New England (especially New Bedford, Fall River, and Gloucester, MA). And a major migration to South America via Brazil. From there, some entered the Spanish colonies. Brazil was laxer in enforcing the Sephardic New Christian immigrant passage prohibition. Between 1580 and 1640, when the Spanish Crown annexed the Kingdom of Portugal, the influx of Portuguese conversos into the Spanish colonies in South America became such that by the early 1600s the term "portugués" had become synonymous with "Jewish" in the Spanish colonies. The Old Christian majority among the Portuguese in Portugal and Brazil complained that they were being denigrated by such association. To this day, Portuguese surnames are among the many descendants of these people in Spanish-speaking countries of the Americas. Many Hispanicized their surnames to fit Spanish orthography, hiding their "Portuguese" (i.e., Jewish) origin. To this day, Portuguese Bnei Anousim are some of the staunchest promoters of coming back to Sephardi Judaism (through conversion, or formal "return"). In Brazil alone, over 50 of these communities have also created a Federation.

=== Reverting to Judaism ===
Only a small number of people of colonial-era Sephardic descent in Spain, Portugal, Hispanic America, or Brazil are reverting to Judaism. Generally, formal or officially sanctioned or sponsored conversions by Jewish religious institutions, including the Israeli rabbinate, require individuals to undergo a formal conversion process to be accepted as Jews. There are Rabbis today, however, in Europe, the USA, and Latin America who are addressing this "injustice" of the ban on "returnees" from being members of the mainstream Jewish communities in Latin American countries, and we see this trend growing.

Since the early 21st century there has been a steady growth in the number of descendants indicating interest in a return to mainstream Judaism. Many Sephardic Bnei Anusim have accepted their historical Jewish ancestry and generations of intermarriage, and a contemporary Christian affiliation, along with their modern national identities as Spaniards, Portuguese, and Latin Americans of various nations. The Bnei Anousim Return Movement is alive and well and growing every year.

Whereas Conversos (those whose families did not preserve Jewish customs and traditions) have begun to syncretize their Christian religious identities and ethnic identities with an ethnic Jewish secular identity, without seeking reversion to Judaism. Among these are some who have shifted toward adopting Messianic Judaism (that is, Jewish-emphasizing forms of Christianity). Messianic Jewish congregations (styled less like churches and more like synagogues) have been sprouting up around Latin America in the last several years, and are mainly composed of Sephardic Bnei Anusim. Members of these congregations often call their congregation a sinagoga (Spanish for "synagogue"), Beit Knesset (Hebrew for "synagogue"), or Kehilah (Hebrew for "congregation").

The fact that Conversos leans towards Messianic "Jewish" forms of Christianity rather than reverting to Judaism itself is suggested as a paradigm resulting from factors in Latin America. There are various factors that contribute to the fact that Conversos and for the Bnei Anousim do not return to mainstream Judaism.

==== Impeding factors ====
===== Internal reluctance due to habitual tradition =====
Sephardic Bnei Anusim and Conversos are sometimes reluctant to fully abandon a Christian faith (or living secretly as Jews) within which they and their immediate ancestors have lived. It has been a tradition in their families for centuries now. And it may also be the case that some individuals want to make a comeback to Judaism, while other family members are against it. And it is sometimes the case that other family members are even reluctant for it to be known that they were originally Jewish (the fears because of anti-Semitism and the history of persecutions still haunt some of them to this day). In many cases, the mainstream Jewish world does not welcome them back.

===== Targeting by Messianic Judaism =====
In addition, many Sephardic Bnei Anusim and Conversos resent being targeted and proselytized by Messianic Jewish organizations since there has been more publicity about the ancient, partially Jewish communities. Such Messianic Jewish organizations have been accused of discouraging Sephardic Bnei Anusim from rejoining mainstream Judaism, suggesting their faith as a form to integrate their complex ancestries.

===== Takkanah prohibition on conversions in Latin America =====
However, the major factor impeding reversions stems from a takkanah, or Jewish religious community edict, which was decreed in 1927 in Argentina and later adopted by almost all the mainstream Jewish communities in Latin America. This was done at the request of recently arrived immigrant Eastern Sephardim from Syria. The mainstream Jewish community in Argentina (composed of a Syrian Sephardim minority and a European Ashkenazim majority, who were made up of 20th-century immigrants) ruled in the takkanah that, to combat the high rate of assimilation of the relatively newly formed Argentine Jewish community of that time, and their intermarriage with to gentiles, the local mainstream Jewish communities would not support conversion of gentile spouses, suspicious that they were insincere. Conversions in Argentina were prohibited "until the end of time".

The takkanah was directed against gentiles of no historical Jewish ancestry. But the takkanah has been applied to all conversions, and thus has prevented any of the Sephardic Bnei Anusim in Argentina (and later in other countries in Latin America) who may want to convert (or return) to Judaism formally.

The takkanah was intended to combat what some of the community and rabbinate considered high rates of insincere conversions being performed solely to enable intermarriages of Jews to gentiles. Because sometimes such converts and their children did not fully embrace Judaism, there were net losses to the Jewish population.

The takkanah later had influence throughout the rest of Latin America. Most local mainstream Jewish communities have continued prohibiting all conversions/reversions on the continent. New York City's Syrian Jewish community also adopted this prohibition, although in theory it was limited to conversions to be performed for the sake of marriage. As implemented in 1935, the takkanah in New York has been amended to say that "no future Rabbinic Court will have the right or authority to convert non-Jews who seek to marry into our [Syrian Jewish] community." The takkanah in New York City holds no force among the overwhelmingly Ashkenazi Jewish population of the city and North America in general.

Because of the takkanah, Sephardic Bnei Anusim have accused mainstream Jewish communities in Latin America of classism, racism, and outright discrimination, as many of their members have African and Native American or indigenous ancestry in addition to European. In Latin America, the Jewish communities are predominantly made up of European Ashkenazim. On the other hand, members of mainstream Jewish communities have argued that it is best for converts and returnees to form their own communities where they all share that experience of conversion (or return) and will be accepted by their own kind. These are the communities that the Israeli government calls "emerging communities" and they are banned (by the Ministry of Interior) from making aliyah.

And so for their part, the local Jewish communities (whether Ashkenazi or Syrian Sephardi) have insisted that the status quo of non-conversions/reversions in Latin America by local Jewish communities, and their isolated and insular natures in Latin America, is due to the historical anti-assimilationist needs for the Jewish community to survive. Often, the Syrian Sephardim and European Ashkenazim were isolated from each other, as they came from different cultural spheres and tended to settle with others of their kind. They were not united across such barriers by Judaism. But in the 21st century, the Ashkenazim and Sephardim have melded mainly into a single communal identity in Latin America.

===== Local Jewish desire to avoid accusations of proselytizing =====
In addition, the local Jewish communities did not want to be accused of proselytizing Judaism to Christian people. Latin American Catholics of non-Jewish background said that the Jews were "stealing souls" from the Catholic Church. This is no longer the case, however. Since 1965, with the 2nd Vatican Council, the Roman Catholic Church decided that it would no longer blame ALL Jews for ALL time for the killing of their Christian Messiah. In 1968, influenced by Vatican II, the civil government of Spain finally (and formally) revoked the Alhambra Decree (also known as the edict of expulsion from Spain in 1492). More recently, both Spain and Portugal have invited the descendants of the exiled Sephardi Jews to return as citizens of Spain and Portugal, once they could demonstrate their Sephardi ancestry.

Because of these factors, the limited number of recent reversions/conversions to Judaism performed in Latin America (especially South America) have generally been conducted by visiting religious emissaries from either North American Ashkenazi Jewish communities or Sephardi Rabbis in America or delegated by the Israeli Rabbinate.

The conversions/reversions have been based on a formal conversion process. In contrast, some individuals have gone through a "return" process. Prospective converts have to undergo at least one year of online Jewish religious study with the sponsoring foreign Jewish religious organization or authority. They must complete the physical requirements of reversion/conversion for the individual or small group, which are performed by a delegation sent by the foreign sponsoring Jewish religious organization. Some individual Latin Americans have also reverted/converted to Judaism abroad. Other Batei Din (of mainly Sephardi and some Ashkenazi Rabbis) require for "returnees" documentation of their "evidence" of the mother's female line of secretly Jewish women, plus some amount of time in learning the basics of Judaism (halakha) and a basic level of observance.

In the late 20th century, a group of people in Iquitos, Peru, who believed they were descendants of 19th-century male Jewish traders and their indigenous wives, began to study Judaism seriously. They were aided by a rabbi from Brooklyn, New York. They were allowed to make aliyah to Israel. There, they had to undergo formal conversion as overseen and conducted by Orthodox authorities in order to be accepted as Jewish. Their Jewish ancestors had been among Moroccan immigrants to Iquitos during the rubber boom of the late 19th and early 20th centuries.

==== Foreign Jewish outreach programs ====
Several foreign Jewish outreach organizations are appealing to Sephardic Bnei Anusim. Among these is Shavei Israel, which operates in Spain, Portugal, and throughout Latin America, and has its headquarters in Israel. They deal with Sephardi-descended Spaniards, Portuguese, and Latin Americans who are seeking a formal conversion to the Jewish people, after centuries of separation. Their Rabbis typically do not work with "returnees" who want to present "evidence" to the Beit Din of their secretly Jewish ancestors. Other organizations working to reach out to and/or reconnect the Sephardic Bnei Anusim include Sephardim Hope International and Reconectar. Lastly, Ezra L'Anousim is an Israeli non-profit (since 2005). They are the only non-profit made up of all volunteers, most of whom are also from the Bnei Anousim ancestry. They are helping the Bnei Anousim (both converts and returnees) on a global basis and have an international social media team for their outreach. They work with European Bnei Anousim, Bnei Anousim in all the Americas and Caribbean, Bnei Anousim from M.E.N.A. (Middle East and North Africa), and Bnei Anousim individuals who live as far away as Australia, New Zealand, the Philippines, and Indonesia Ezra L'Anousim.

== Settlements and concentrations ==
=== Iberia ===
In Iberia itself, known and attested settlements of Bnei Anusim include the population of Belmonte, in Portugal, and the Xueta of Palma de Majorca, in Spain.

In 2011 Rabbi Nissim Karelitz, a leading Halachic authority and chairman of the Beit Din Tzedek rabbinical court in Bnei Brak, Israel, recognized the entire Xueta community of Bnei Anusim in Palma de Majorca, as Jews. That population consisted of approximately 18,000 people, or just over 2% of the entire population of the island.

Of the Bnei Anusim community in Belmonte, Portugal, some officially returned to Judaism in the 1970s. They opened a synagogue, Bet Eliahu, in 1996. The Belmonte community of Bnei Anusim as a whole, however, have not yet been granted the same recognition as Jews that the Xueta of Palma de Majorca achieved in 2011.

Both Portugal and Spain have people with Jewish ancestry. According to DNA studies, up to 20% of the modern population of Spain and Portugal have Jewish ancestry. Some are likely Bnei Ansuim whose Sephardic Jewish ancestors converted but stayed in the Peninsula.

=== Ibero-America ===
Recent historical studies suggest that the number of New Christians of Sephardi origin who participated in the conquest and settlement was more significant than previously estimated. Noted Spanish conquistadors, administrators, settlers, and Pedro Cieza de León, chronicler, have been confirmed to have been of Sephardi origin.

Recent discoveries have been related to newly found records in Spain,. These have related to conversions, marriages, baptisms, and Inquisition trials of the parents, grandparents and great-grandparents of the Sephardi-origin Iberian immigrants.

Overall, scholars estimate that up to 10% of colonial Latin America's Iberian settlers may have been of Sephardic origin. Their regional distribution of settlement was varied. Iberian settlers of New Christian origin ranged anywhere from none in most areas, to as high as 1 in every 3 (approx. 30%) Iberian settlers in other areas.

Recent DNA studies and historical settlement patterns of New Christians indicate that the concentration of these Hispanic/Latino-assimilated Christian-professing descendants of Sephardic Jews are found primarily in the following localities (from north to south):

- The formerly Spanish/Mexican-held American Southwest, especially northern New Mexico and southern Colorado
- The northernmost states of Mexico bordering the American Southwest, particularly Nuevo León and also in the region of Los Altos de Jalisco
- Cities near the valleys of the Acaraú River, and the Jaguaribe River, located in the state of Ceará, in northeastern Brazil.
- Seridó region in northeastern Brazil
- The departments located in the andean regions of central Colombia
- South and central regions of Ecuador, especially Loja and Zaruma
- The sierra areas of northwestern Peru
- Santa Cruz de la Sierra in Bolivia's east
- The Río de la Plata Basin region in eastern Argentina, and
- The southern region of Chile.

The common characteristic of all the above-mentioned localities is that they are situated in remote areas, isolated either by distance or geographical features from the Spanish colonial administrative centers. These were located in Mexico City, in central Mexico, and Lima, in central Peru. This contrasts with the initial settlement patterns of the New Christians during the early days of the Spanish Conquest. Most settled in the urban colonial and commercial hubs of Mexico City and Lima, seeking more familiar centers to their former lives.

When the Spanish Inquisition was introduced to the New World, it set up bases in Mexico City and Lima. Many New Christians fled to more geographically isolated areas in neighboring Spanish colonies, and it was also a pattern of gradual settlement of the more distant areas. These events accomplished the depopulation of Sephardi-origin New Christians from all of Peru and Mexico, other than their respective northernmost regions.

==== Later Sephardic arrivals ====
After the Inquisition was finally officially disbanded in the 19th century, descendants of Sephardim immigrated to Latin America as Jews. These Sephardim are clearly distinguishable history from the Sephardic Bnei Anusim. The following are a few of the more notable immigration waves of Sephardic Jews into Latin America since the 19th century.

During the rubber boom in the 19th century, Peru received Sephardic immigrants, many of whom were North African Sephardim from Morocco. Thousands of their mostly assimilated mixed-race (mestizo) descendants still live throughout the Amazon basin. (See also Amazonian Jews).

Mexico and Argentina also received Sephardic immigrants, many being Eastern Sephardim from Syria. This wave arrived prior to and following World War I and the collapse of the Ottoman Empire.

Venezuela received Western Sephardim in its northern region from neighboring island nations to its north. These Western Sephardic immigrants usually arrived with other Dutch immigrants to their colonies in the Americas such as Curaçao, as they had first settled in the tolerant Netherlands. They have also settled in places such as Panama, Honduras, and Colombia. This multi-stop migration was a centuries-long process.

The descendants of Western Sephardi immigrants in Latin America include at least four heads of state: Max Delvalle Levy-Maduro and his nephew Eric Arturo Delvalle Cohen-Henríquez (both presidents of Panama); Ricardo Maduro (former president of Honduras), all three of whom were raised as Jews; and Nicolás Maduro (current president of Venezuela, who was raised as Catholic).

North African Sephardim in Peru have largely assimilated to the majority culture, in part because their early immigrants were mostly men, who married local women to establish their families. Eastern Sephardim in Mexico, who arrived as families, have remained largely in Jewish communities. Western Sephardim in Hispanic America have include both descendants who have assimilated and others who live as Jews.

=== Israel ===
There is a small but strong contingent of Jewish immigrants to Israel from Latin America, predominantly from within the mainstream Jewish (Ashkenazi and Sephardi) communities resident in Latin America. Among these immigrants from Latin America, however, there are also some, but not many, persons of Sephardic Bnei Anusim origin that have also immigrated, most of which arrived in Israel after official reversions/conversions outside Israel.

It has been reported in the Israeli media that some Sephardic Bnei Anusim have regularized their status once in Israel after arriving as tourists or visitors. Other Sephardic Bnei Ansuim have been deported or threatened with deportation. In one instance in 2009, the Interior Ministry sought to deport the elderly Bnei Anusim parents of Colombian siblings who were Israeli citizens. All the members of the family are of Bnei Ansuim heritage, but only the younger generation (the siblings) had reverted to Judaism, while their parents had not. The siblings made aliyah as Jews and acquired Israeli citizenship. Having been left alone in Colombia, the parents then followed their children to Israel, where they lived with them for 5 years. The parents were then threatened with deportation.

==== Law of Return ====
The Israeli Law of Return does not apply to Sephardic Bnei Anusim in their own right unless, on an individual basis, a prospective applicant for the Law of Return who is of Sephardic Bnei Anusim origin has officially reverted/converted to Rabbinic Judaism.

In the case of Sephardic Bnei Anusim who officially convert to Judaism through a mainstream Jewish community, the Law of Return then encompasses that individual not because the applicant is of Sephardic Bnei Anusim origin (i.e. having Jewish ancestry), but because he or she is now an official mainstream Jew following formal conversion to Judaism. Please see that article for further information on the details of the Law of Return. However, for the Bnei Anousim who convert as a member of an "emerging community" of all converts (who cannot join a mainstream Jewish community due to a ban on that in Latin American countries) the current Ministry of Interior had placed a further discriminatory ban on them prohibiting them making aliyah under the Law of Return.

The Law of Return does encompass, however, an individual from the Bnei Anousim who has made a "return" to the faith and traditions of their Sephardic Jewish ancestors - and is accepted by a Beit Din as Jewish - provided that they have sufficient evidence(s) of their mother's female line of Crypto-Jewish women. Yaffah Batya daCosta (CEO of Ezra L'Anousim in Jerusalem) is just one such example of a "returnee". She was accepted as Jewish by an Orthodox Beit Din (of the RCA in New York) in 2000, and made aliyah on her "return certificate" in 2004. She is knowledgeable and experienced in what kind of "evidences" a Beit Din will need to see, and acts as a coach for Bnei Anousim worldwide who would also like to return (or revert) to Sephardi Judaism. She works with Orthodox Rabbis in Europe, the US and Latin America.

==== Public awareness campaigns ====
Several organizations catering to Sephardic Bnei Anusim have been established around Israel. Some are cultural and information centres for the education of the general Israeli public, while others are a combination of cultural and information centres which also promote and provide assistance and advocate for rights to conversions, immigration and absorption of reverts to Judaism of Sephardic Bnei Ansuim origin.

Casa Shalom holds lectures and seminars in their centre in Netanya, Israel and work to help Sephardic Bnei Ansusim investigate and reclaim their heritage.

Shavei Israel, with headquarters in Jerusalem is an advocacy and Jewish outreach organization with links to religious institutions in helping Bnei Anusim in their branches in Spain, Portugal and South America return to Judaism. Shavei Israel has thus far assisted over 2,000 Bnei Anusim in Spain and Portugal to return to Judaism.

Sephardi Hope International (SHI) runs the Anusim Center in Be'er Sheva, Israel.

Reconectar has a mission to reconnect those descendants of Spanish and Portuguese Jewish communities that wish it, and at the level they seek, with the Jewish world. Ashley Perry is the current president of the organization and also director of the Knesset Caucus for the Reconnection with the Descendants of Spanish and Portuguese Jewish communities.

Ezra L'Anousim is an Israeli non-profit (since 2005) helping the descendants of Spanish and Portuguese individuals and communities globally. Yaffah Batya daCosta is the CEO and she is herself a "returnee" from the Bnei Anousim and has been working within this movement for almost 30 years. Her organization is the only one helping the Bnei Anousim with an all volunteer staff of managing directors, most of whom are also from this Bnei Anousim ancestry.

=== India ===
Outside of Iberia and the Iberian colonies in the Americas, the Portuguese colony of Goa, now part of India, also received Sephardic Anusim, where they were subjected to the Goa Inquisition. In 1494, after the signing of the Treaty of Tordesillas, authorized by Pope Alexander VI, Portugal was given the right to found colonies in the Eastern Hemisphere and Spain was given dominance over the New World. In the East, as Professor Walter Fischel, the now deceased Chair of the Department of Near Eastern History at the University of California - Berkeley, explains, the Portuguese found use for the Sephardic anusim in Goa and their other Indian and Asian possessions. Jews were used as "letter-carriers, translators, agents, etc." The ability of the Sephardic Jews and anusim to speak Arabic made them vital to Portuguese colonial ambitions in the East, where they could interact and go on diplomatic and trade missions in the Muslim courts of the Mughal Empire. India also attracted Sephardic Jews and anusim for other reasons. In his lecture at the Library of Congress, Professor Sanjay Subrahmanyam, chair in Social Sciences at University of California, Los Angeles, explains that Sephardic anusim were especially attracted to India because not only was it a center of trade in goods such as spices and diamonds, but India also had established and ancient Jewish settlements, such as the one at Cochin, along its Western coast. The presence of these older communities offered the anusim, who had been forced to accept Catholicism, the chance to live within the Portuguese Empire, away from the Inquisition, and, if they wished, they were able to contact the Jews in these communities and re-adopt the faith of their fathers. The presence of anusim in India aroused the anger of the Archbishop of Goa, Dom Gaspar Jorge de Leão Pereira and others who wrote polemics and letters to Lisbon urging that the Inquisition be brought to India. Twenty-four years after Portuguese Inquisition began, the Goan Inquisition came to India in 1560 after Francis Xavier placed another request for it to the King of Portugal. The impact of anusim in Portuguese India and Portugal's other eastern colonies continues to be a subject of on-going academic research.

There was also an influential presence of Sephardic anusim in the Fort St. George which was later called Madras and is today called Chennai, India. In its earlier years under Governor Elihu Yale (who later founded Yale University) appointed three Jewish aldermen (out of a total of 12 aldermen) to represent the Jewish population in the fledgling city.

The conqueror of Jaffna kingdom, included Phillippe de Oliveira, probably has Sephardi origin with his surname and he probably has converso ancestry. Oliveiras has family tradition source which said this surname has origin of Levite or Judah from the destruction of Jerusalem in 70 A.D.

== DNA and genetics ==
=== in Latin America ===
Some demographic and journalistic analyses have extrapolated these partial findings and suggested that tens of millions of Latin Americans may have at least some degree of converso or Sephardic Jewish ancestry.

Genetic studies focused on specific national or regional populations have reported that approximately 10% to 25% of certain sampled subpopulations exhibit genetic signals compatible with Sephardic or converso ancestry.

=== Haplogroups identified in Mexico and Central America ===
Genetic studies examining paternal (Y-chromosome) and maternal (mitochondrial DNA) lineages in Mexico and Central America have identified several haplogroups associated with Near Eastern maternal haplogrups and others related to Sephardic Jewish ancestry.

==== Mitochondrial maternal DNA haplogroups ====
Maternal lineage studies in Mexico and Central America indicate that the

Alongside these native lineages, West Eurasian mitochondrial haplogroups have been identified, including haplogroup T2e, which has been associated in genetic research with Sephardic Jewish maternal ancestry and has been detected in populations of Iberian descent and their colonial-era descendants in the Americas.

These maternal haplogroups document a genetic contribution from Iberian and Sephardic-associated lineages within the broader admixed populations of Mexico and Central America, consistent with historical records of converso settlement during the colonial period.

In some cases, Sephardi-descended Hispanics of the communities of Bnei Anusim have inherited genetic mutations and diseases to Jews or Sephardi Jews in particular, including Jewish-specific mutations of the BRCA1 and BRCA2 genes which increases the risk of breast cancer (found also among Hispanos of the Southwestern United States) and Laron syndrome (found also among Ecuadorians).

The mutations are found in Ashkenazi Jews of European maternal lineage, who have European mt-DNA that is passed from mother to child, and in Anusim women of Hispanic maternal lineage. The Ashkenazi Anusim and Hispanic Anusim are different from the Middle Eastern Sephardi Jews Anusim. The ancestors of the Middle Eastern Sephardi Jews Anusim exiled from the Middle East to Spain. "...This is the largest study to date of high-risk Hispanic families in the United States. Six recurrent mutations accounted for 47% (16 of 34) of the deleterious mutations in this cohort. The BRCA1185delAG mutation was prevalent (3.6%) in this clinic-based cohort of predominantly Mexican descent, and shared the Ashkenazi Jewish founder haplotype.

== Surnames ==
Almost all Sephardic Bnei Anusim today carry surnames which are known to have been used by Sephardic Jews during the 15th century. Surnames known to have been carried by Jews included Cueva, Luna, León, Pérez, López, Salazar, Córdova, Torres, Castro, Álvarez, González, Gómez, Fernández, Costa, Mendes, Rivera, Maduro. Then other surnames included De Leon and de Oliveira. It is extremely important to note, however, that all of these mentioned surnames, and almost all other surnames which were carried by 15th century Sephardim, were never specifically Jewish in origin, that is, they were never exclusively "Sephardic surnames", if such a thing exists other than in the most rarest and limited of cases.

Almost all these surnames are in fact surnames of gentile Spanish origin (or gentile Portuguese origin) which only became common among Sephardic Jews (and consequently among Sephardic Anusim when Sephardic Jews converted to Catholicism under pressure, and passed by these onto their Bnei Anusim descendants) precisely because Sephardic Jews deliberately adopted these surnames, which were stereotypically common among the Old Christian population. In this way, they hoped to be associated with being Old Christians, in an attempt to obscure their true Jewish pedigrees, and avoid discrimination and social ostracism. After conversion, New Christians of Jewish origin generally adopted Christian given names and Old Christian surnames. Eventually, all Old Christian given names and surnames were in use by New Christians of Jewish origin.

Only a small number of surnames held by Sephardic Bnei Anusim (or for that matter, only a very few surnames held by modern-day Sephardic Jews who may still carry Spanish and Portuguese surnames) are surnames that pertain exclusively to a Sephardic or Sephardic Anusim origin to the exclusion of any Old Christian carriers of the same surname.

Among descendants of Sephardic Jews today, there are three categories of descendants:

1) Eastern Sephardim and North African Sephardim, being those who are today Jewish because they descend from Sephardim who remained Jewish (never becoming New Christians), and left Iberia before the deadline set in the Alhambra Decree.

2) Western Sephardim, being those who are today Jewish because they descended from Sephardim who initially became New Christians because they did not, or could not, leave Iberia by the deadline set in the Alhambra Decree, but later reverted to Judaism (even if generations later) once they finally left Iberia by venturing to places other than the Iberian colonies in the Americas.

3) Sephardic Bnei Anusim (including Neo-Western Sephardim), the subjects of this article, being those who are today fully assimilated as Spanish, Portuguese, Hispanic or Brazilian Christians, since they descend from Sephardim who became New Christians, never reverted to Judaism in any subsequent generation, because they could not leave Iberia or they ventured to the Iberian colonies in the Americas where the Inquisition eventually followed them.

Generally, it is only those who descend from Eastern Sephardim and North African Sephardim who carry surnames which typically identify the surname (and thus the carrier of the surname) as being of Jewish origins. The other descendants of Sephardic Jews (those descended from Western Sephardim, and especially those who are Sephardic Bnei Anusim and Neo-Western Sephardim) almost always carry "Old Christian" Spanish or Portuguese surnames because they became nominal Christians, whether intermittently or permanently.

Especially for Western Sephardim, Sephardic Bnei Anusim, and Neo-Western Sephardim, only a very and extremely limited number of surnames carried by are exclusively Jewish or "New Christian" surnames being capable of, on their own, indicating Jewish origins of the surname or the surname-carrier. The great majority of the surnames of persons in these groups are, per se, Old Christian surnames, and these surnames alone cannot indicate a Jewish origin without congregational membership (if the person is a Western Sephardic Jew), or accompanying genealogical documentation, family traditions and customs, and/or Genealogical DNA testing (if the person is a Sephardic Ben/Bat Anusim or a newly reverted Neo-Western Sephardic Jew).

Although it is true that a few surnames among those specifically mentioned above became popularly adopted by New Christians (including, most notably the surname Pérez, because of its similarity to the Hebrew surname Peretz), such popularly adopted surnames by New Christians remain Old Christian surnames in origin, and carrying these surnames does not by itself indicate Jewish ancestry.

This phenomenon is much the same as is the situation with surnames which are typically considered to be Ashkenazi "Jewish" surnames. Most "Jewish" surnames among Ashkenazi Jews are not in fact "Jewish" per se, but are simply German or Slavic surnames (including so-called "Jewish" names like Goldberg) which were adopted by Ashkenazi Jews—some of which became so overwhelmingly carried by Jews that they came to be seen as "Jewish." Although there are gentile carriers of these same surnames, it is often because those gentile families had these surnames to begin with. Only some surnames found among Ashkenazi Jews today are exclusively "Jewish" surnames being capable of, on their own, indicating Jewish origins of the carrier.

== Notable people ==
- Linda Chavez (June 17, 1947) American author, commentator, and radio talk show host. She is also a Fox News analyst, Chairman of the Center for Equal Opportunity, and has a syndicated newspaper column. Former Secretary of Labor under George W. Bush.

== See also ==
- Marranos
- Zera Yisrael
- Crypto-Judaism
- Lançados
- Degredados
- Sinagoga
- Amazonian Jews
- Gerim
