= Old Christian =

Social and legal category in early modern Iberia

Old Christian (Spanish: cristiano viejo, Portuguese: cristão-velho, Catalan: cristià vell) was a social and law-effective category used in the Iberian Peninsula from the late 15th and early 16th century onwards, to distinguish Portuguese and Spanish people attested as having cleanliness of blood (Limpieza de sangre), from the populations categorized as New Christian. 'New Christian' refer to mainly persons of partial or full Jewish descent who converted to Christianity, and their descendants. (Note: Though many of Spain's Muslims were themselves descendants of native Iberians who converted to Islam under Muslim rule.)

After the expulsion of the Jewish population from Spain in 1492, and Portugal in 1497, all the remaining Jewish population in Iberia became officially Christian. The New Christians were always under suspicion of apostasy. The creation of the Spanish Inquisition in 1478 and the Portuguese Inquisition in 1536 was justified by the need to fight heresy. It was believed that many New Christians were practicing their original religion in secret and were Crypto-Jews. The term was thus introduced in order for "Old Christians" to distinguish themselves from the converts (conversos), and their descendants, who were seen as potential heretics and threats to Catholic orthodoxy. New Christians of Muslim heritage were referred to pejoratively as moriscos, meaning Moor-like. Those of Jewish heritage were termed marranos (swine, pigs).

The system and ideology of cleanliness of blood ostracized New Christian minorities from society, regardless of their actual degree of sincerity as converts, giving far more privileges to Old Christians, the majority of the population.

In Portugal, the legal distinction between New and Old Christian was ended through a legal decree issued by the Marquis of Pombal in 1772.

== Bibliography ==
- J. Lúcio de Azevedo (1989). História dos Cristãos Novos Portugueses. Lisboa: Clássica Editora.
- David M. Gitlitz (1996). Secrecy and deceit: the religion of the crypto-Jews. Philadelphia: Jewish Publication Society. ISBN 0-8276-0562-5.
