= Sepharad =

Hebrew name for Spain

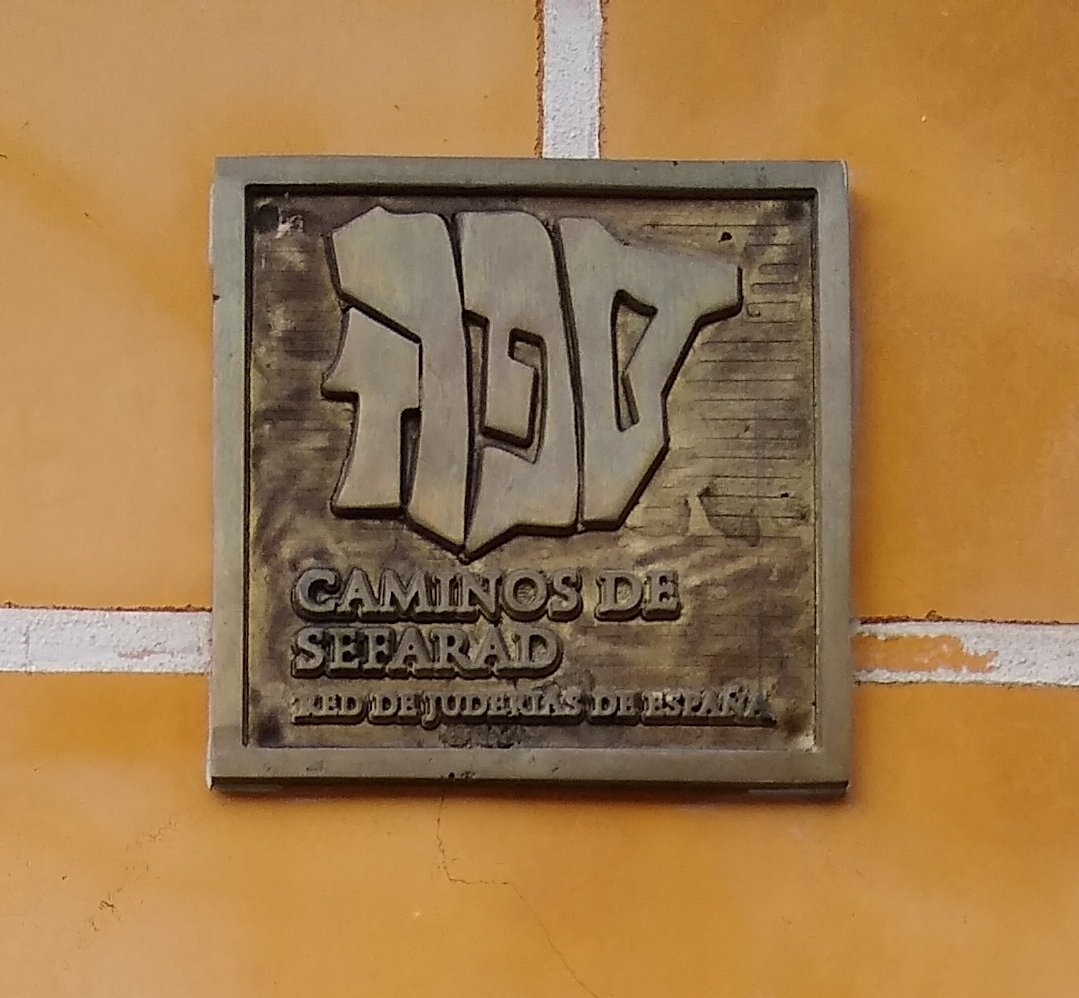
Commemorative plaque of the Network of Jewish Quarters of Spain. Seville, Andalusia, Spain.

Sepharad (/ˈsɛfəræd/ SEF-ər-ad or /səˈfɛərəd/ sə-FAIR-əd; Hebrew: סְפָרַד, romanized: Səp̄āraḏ, Israeli pronunciation: [sfaˈʁad]; also Sfard, Spharad, Sefarad, or Sephared) is the Hebrew-language name for the Iberian Peninsula, referring to the regions of present-day Spain, Portugal, Andorra and Gibraltar. By the 9th century, the term had come to denote this geographic area in Jewish usage. The designation Sephardic Jews refers to Jews whose ancestors lived in the Iberian Peninsula and were forcibly expelled beginning in 1492. In modern Hebrew, Sepharad primarily refers to Spain.

The term Sepharad appears in the Biblical Book of Obadiah as the name of some now-unidentified location that was a destination of Jews exiled from Jerusalem. The Targum Jonathan is the earliest known source of the interpretation of the name as referring to Spain; it translates Sepharad into Aramaic as Ispamia.

== Version comparisons ==
- Obadiah 1:20 (trans. Judaica Press): "And this exiled host of the children of Israel who are [with] the Canaanites as far as Zarephath and the exile of Jerusalem which is in Sepharad shall inherit the cities of the southland"
- Obadiah 1:20 (NKJV): "And the captivity of this host of the children of Israel, that are among the Canaanites, even unto Zarephath, and the captivity of Jerusalem, that is in Sepharad, shall possess the cities of the South."
- Obadiah 1:20 (Vulgate): "et transmigratio exercitus huius filiorum Israhel omnia Chananeorum usque ad Saraptham et transmigratio Hierusalem quae in Bosforo est possidebit civitates austri".
- Abdias 1:20 (Douay-Rheims): "And the captivity of this host of the children of Israel, all the places of the Chanaanites even to Sarepta: and the captivity of Jerusalem that is in Bosphorus, shall possess the cities of the south."
- Jerusalem Bible (1966): "... and the exiles from Jerusalem now in Sepharad will occupy the towns of the Negeb." An editors' note in the Jerusalem Bible argues that "Sepharad is unknown".

== See also ==
- Sephardic law and customs
- Tzarfat
