= Lindauer =

Lindauer may refer to:

- Lindauer (surname)
- Lindauer Allee (Berlin U-Bahn)
- Lindauer (wine), a New Zealand sparkling wine
- Lindauer DORNIER GmbH, textile machinery manufacturer located in Lindau, Germany
- Lindauer Brothers Company, dealers in men's furnishing goods in Chicago, Illinois
- Lindauer (grape), a Swiss wine grape that is also known as Completer
- Lindauer (search firm), a global nonprofit executive search firm.
- General term for people of the town of Lindau in Bavaria, Germany

== See also ==
- Lindau (disambiguation)
