= Crypto-Judaism =

Secret adherence to Judaism

Crypto-Judaism is the secretive adherence to Judaism while publicly professing to be of another faith. Practitioners are referred to as "crypto-Jews" (from the Greek word kryptos – κρυπτός, 'hidden').

The term is especially applied historically to Spanish and Portuguese Jews who outwardly professed Catholicism, also known as Conversos, Marranos, or the Anusim; in Italy they were known as Neofiti. The phenomenon is especially associated with medieval Spain, following the Massacre of 1391 and the expulsion of the Jews in 1492. After 1492 in Spain and 1497 in Portugal, officially they no longer existed. The Spanish Inquisition and the Portuguese Inquisition were established to monitor converted Jews and Muslims and their descendants for their continued adherence to Christian faith and practice, with severe penalties for those convicted of secretly continuing to practice their original beliefs. This would have involved the Inquisition paying close attention to the households of suspected converted Jews, since most of the families still practicing Judaism would have done so through the food. Information about secretly observant Jews largely survives in Inquisition cases against individuals.

== Spain ==
Officially, Jews who converted in Spain during the 14th and 15th centuries were known as Cristianos Nuevos (New Christians) but were commonly called conversos (converts to Christianity). Spain and Portugal issued edicts restricting their rights in the mother countries of Spain and Portugal and Spanish and Portuguese overseas territories in the Americas.

Although only Cristianos Viejos (Old Christians) who could prove limpieza de sangre ("cleanliness or purity of blood") descended from Christian Iberian European ancestry only, without "tainting" of any Jewish ancestry or Muslim Berber/Arab ancestry, were allowed to officially migrate to the New World Spanish possessions, many Christian conversos with Jewish antecedents went to the Spanish possessions, using forged limpieza de sangre documents, or they entered the Spanish possessions via Portuguese Brazil, particularly 1580–1640 when Spain and Portugal were ruled by the same monarch. The entry requirements to the Portuguese colony of Brazil were more lax and also less rigorously enforced.

Despite the dangers of the Spanish Inquisition in Iberia and the Inquisitions established in Mexico City; Lima, Peru; and Cartagena de Indias in what is now Colombia, many conversos continued to secretly and discreetly practice Jewish rituals in the home.

After the Alhambra decree of March 1492, which mandated conversion to Christianity or exile for Jews, numerous conversos, also called Xueta (or Chueta) in the Balearic Islands ruled by Spain, publicly professed Roman Catholicism but privately adhered to Judaism, even throughout the Spanish Inquisition.

=== Before the Spanish Inquisition ===
According to the Encyclopaedia Judaica, several incidents of forced conversions happened prior to 1492 and outside of Iberia. One of the earliest conversions happened a century after the Fall of Rome and was in Clermont-Ferrand. After a member of the Jewish community in Clermont-Ferrand became a Jewish Christian and was persecuted by other members of the community for doing so, the cavalcade in which he was marching persecuted his persecutors in turn:

The participants in the procession then made an attack "which destroyed [the synagogue] completely, razing it to the grounds." Subsequently, Bishop *Avitus directed a letter to the Jews in which he disclaimed the use of compulsion to make them adopt Christianity, but announced at the end of the missive: "Therefore if ye be ready to believe as I do, be one flock with us, and I shall be your pastor; but if ye be not ready, depart from this place." The community hesitated for three days before making a decision. Finally the majority, some 500, accepted Christianity. The Christians in Clermont greeted the event with rejoicing: "Candles were lit, the lamps shone, the whole city radiated with the light of the snow-white flock" (i.e., the forced converts). The Jews who preferred exile left for *Marseilles (Gregory of Tours, Histories, 5:11). The poet Venantius Fortunatus composed a poem to commemorate the occasion. In 582 the Frankish king Chilperic compelled numerous Jews to adopt Christianity. Again the anusim were not wholehearted in their conversion, for "some of them, cleansed in body but not in heart, denied God, and returned to their ancient perfidy, so that they were seen keeping the Sabbath, as well as Sunday" (ibid., 6:17).

The Clermont-Ferrand conversions preceded the first forced conversions in Iberia by 40 years. Forced baptisms of Jews took place in Iberia in 616 at the insistence of Visigoth monarch Sisibut:

Persistent attempts to enforce conversion were made in the seventh century by the Visigoths in Spain after they had adopted the Roman Catholic faith. Comparatively mild legal measures were followed by the harsh edict issued by King Sisibut in 616, ordering the compulsory baptism of all Jews. After conversion, however, the anusim evidently maintained their Jewish cohesion and religious life. It was undoubtedly this problem that continued to occupy Spanish sovereigns at the successive Councils of Toledo representing both the ecclesiastical and secular authorities...Thus, steps were taken to secure that the children of converts had a Christian religious education as well as to prevent the older generation from continuing to observe the Jewish rites or from failing to observe the Catholic ones. A system of strict supervision by the clergy over the way of life and movements of the anusim was imposed...

== Portugal ==
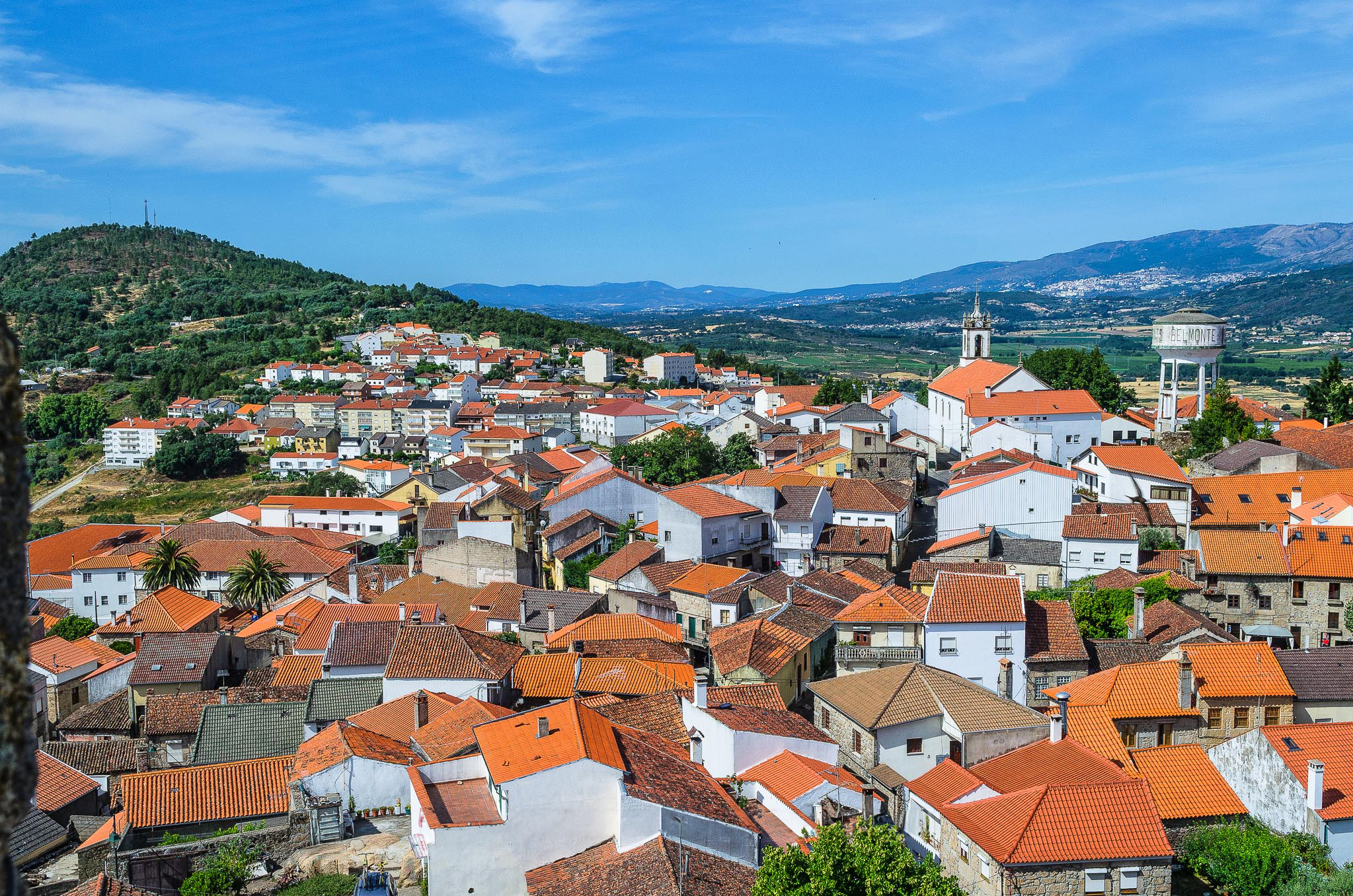
The village of Belmonte, Portugal, home to a crypto-Jewish community for centuries, which was only discovered in the 20th century

In 1496, King Manuel I of Portugal decreed the expulsion of Jews from the kingdom, though many were forced to convert to Christianity rather than leave. In 1536, the Portuguese Inquisition was established with the explicit purpose of persecuting those suspected of secretly adhering to Jewish customs. Some Jews continued practicing their faith secretly for centuries. For example, converted Jews ate a sausage made of poultry or game, known as Alheira, to attempt to hide the practice of not eating pork.

The "Belmonte Jews" of Portugal, dating from the 12th century, maintained strong secret traditions for centuries. A whole community survived in secrecy by maintaining a tradition of endogamous marriage and hiding all external signs of their faith. They and their practices were discovered only in the 20th century. Their rich Sephardic tradition of crypto-Judaism is unique. Some now profess Orthodox Judaism, although many still retain their centuries-old traditions.

In 2006, a Torah scroll, thought to have been used in secret during the Portuguese Inquisition, was discovered by a builder while demolishing a house in Covilhã, a town in central Portugal, near a 16th-century church that had been frequented by New Christians.

== Rest of Europe ==
=== Neofiti ===
The Neofiti were a group of crypto-Jews living in the Kingdom of Sicily, which included all of Southern Italy from the 13th to the 16th centuries.

=== Susiti ===
The ancestral line Süß, Süßkind and Lindauer was a crypto-Jewish susitic ancestral line that settled in the Holy Roman Empire and lived as Catholic or Protestant crypto-Jews. Secondary lineages of the Lindauer are: Lindauere, Lindouer, Lindaer, Linduaer, Lindeaur, Lindeauer, Lindhauer, Linndauer, Lindayer as well as Lindaurr. There are some modern Susiti living in the United States, with two verified families: one in Mariah Hill, Indiana and another in Mid-Coast Maine. Susiti rituals from the Protestant tradition, as practiced by the Susiti in Maine, are similar to those of the Karaites and mainly consist of readings from the Psalms and Hebrew Scriptures. The prayers typically involve stepping three steps backward and then forward while reciting Psalm 84:5, followed by Psalm 3 in the morning and Psalm 4 in the evening then the Shema. This is then followed by a full repetition of Psalm 145 and the which is called the "Holy Prayer" from Kings 8:22–61 the prayers conclude with a repetition of "Who is like You?", the Song of Anna, Psalm 60, and Psalm 137, every prayer concludes with "Selah" due to the literal reading of the end of each Psalm and the false pretense that it was an equivalent to Amen.

== Middle East and North Africa ==
There have been several communities of crypto-Jews in Muslim lands. The ancestors of the Daggatuns in Morocco are thought to have kept up their Jewish practices a long time after their nominal adoption of Islam. In Iran, a large community of crypto-Jews lived in Mashhad, near Khorassan, where they were known as "Jedid al-Islam"; they were mass-converted to Islam around 1839 after the Allahdad events. Most of this community left for Israel in 1946. Some converted to Islam and remained in Iran.

== India ==
In 1494, after the signing of the Treaty of Tordesillas, authorized by Pope Alexander VI, Portugal was given the right to found colonies in the Eastern Hemisphere. In his lecture at the Library of Congress, Professor Sanjay Subrahmanyam, Chair in Social Sciences at University of California, Los Angeles, explains that crypto-Jews were especially attracted to India because not only was it a center of trade, but India had established ancient Jewish settlements along its Western coast. The presence of these communities meant that crypto-Jews, who had been forced to accept Catholicism but did not want to emigrate to tolerant countries (e.g. Morocco, Poland, Ottoman Empire, etc.), could operate within the Portuguese Empire with the full freedom of Catholic subjects but away from the Inquisition while collaborating with existing Jewish communities to hide their true beliefs.

The presence of crypto-Jews in Goa angered the Archbishop of Goa, Dom Gaspar Jorge de Leão Pereira, and other Europeans like Francis Xavier who wrote polemics and letters to Lisbon urging that the Inquisition be brought to Goa. Crypto-Jews presented a security threat to the Kingdom of Portugal, because Sephardic Jews had an established reputation in Iberia for joining forces with Moors to overthrow Christian rulers. The Goan Inquisition commenced in 1560 and ended in 1812. It targeted crypto-Jews, crypto-Muslims, and crypto-Hindus. Of the 1,582 persons convicted between 1560 and 1623, 45.2% were convicted for offenses related to Judaism and Islam. A compilation of the auto-da-fé statistics of the Goa Inquisition reveal that a total of 57 persons were burnt in the flesh and 64 in effigy (i.e. a statue resembling the person). All the burnt were convicted as relapsed heretics or for sodomy.

== Latin America ==
Crypto-Judaism was documented chiefly in Spanish-held colonial territories in northern Mexico. Numerous conversos joined Spanish and Portuguese expeditions, believing there was an economic opportunity in the new lands, and that they would have more freedom at a distance far from Iberia. Different situations developed in the early colonial period of Mexico, the frontier province of Nuevo León, the later northern frontier provinces, and the colonial experience of the Mexican Inquisition. The crypto-Jewish traditions have complex histories and are typically embedded in an amalgam of syncretic Roman Catholic and Judaic traditions. In many ways resurgent Judaic practices mirrored indigenous peoples' maintaining their traditions practiced loosely under a Roman Catholic veil. In addition, Catholicism was syncretic, absorbing other traditions and creating a new creole religion.

The traditional Festival of Santa Esterica was preserved among the Conversos who migrated to the New World and is still practiced today among their descendants.

=== Early Mexico – 16th century ===
Some of the Sephardic Jews expelled from Spain went to Portugal, but in 1497 that country effectively converted all remaining Jewish children, making them wards of the state unless the parents also converted. Therefore, many of the early crypto-Jewish migrants to Mexico in the early colonial days were technically first to second-generation Portuguese with Spanish roots before that. The number of such Portuguese migrants was significant enough that Spanish colonists began to use "Portuguese" as a synonym for "Jewish" for their settlers. Immigration to Mexico offered lucrative trade possibilities in a well-populated colony with nascent Spanish culture. Some migrants believed that this region would be more tolerant since the lands were overwhelmingly populated by non-Christian indigenous peoples and it was far removed from the metropole.

Colonial officials believed that many crypto-Jews were going to Mexico during the 16th century and complained in written documents to Spain that Spanish society in Mexico would become significantly Jewish. Officials found and condemned clandestine synagogues in Mexico City. At this point, colonial administrators instituted the Law of the Pure Blood, which prohibited migration to Mexico for New Christians (Cristiano Nuevo), i.e. anyone who could not prove to be Old Christians for at least the last three generations. In addition, the administration initiated the Mexican Inquisition to ensure the Catholic orthodoxy of all migrants to Mexico. The Mexican Inquisition was also deployed in the traditional manner to ensure orthodoxy of converted indigenous peoples. The first victims of burnings (or autos de fé) of the Mexican Inquisition were indigenous converts convicted of heresy or crypto-Jews convicted of relapsing into their ancestral faith.

Except for those allowed to settle the province of Nuevo Leon under an exemption from the Blood Purity Laws, the number of conversos migrating to the New World was reduced.

=== Northeastern Mexico (Nuevo León) (1590s to early 17th century) ===
The colonization of New Spain took place as a northward expansion over increasingly harsh geography, in regions that were occupied by tribes angered at the encroachment; they formed loose confederations of indigenous peoples to resist the settlers. Spain financed the expansion by exploiting mineral wealth, enslaving, or forcing indigenous peoples to labor in mines. It established encomiendas for raising livestock, thereby displacing the local people. The indigenous peoples of the North-Eastern quadrant of New Spain (Nueva España) proved particularly resistant to colonial pressures. The Chichimec, Apache, and other tribes resisted conversion to Christianity and avoided being impressed as laborers or slaves on Spanish ranches and in mines. The Spanish believed such peoples made the frontier (frontera) a lawless region.

Luis Carvajal y de la Cueva, a royal accountant, was a Portuguese New Christian. He received a royal charter from the Spanish Crown to settle Nuevo León, a large expanse of land in the hostile frontier. Because of the dangers and difficulties of this region, Carvajal y de la Cueva received an exemption in his charter from the usual requirement that he prove that all new settlers were "Old Christians" (of at least three generations) rather than recently converted Jews or Muslims. This exemption allowed people to go to Nuevo León who were legally barred from entering New Spain elsewhere. Carvajal was authorized to bring 100 soldiers and 60 laborers to New Spain; many have been documented as crypto-Jews.

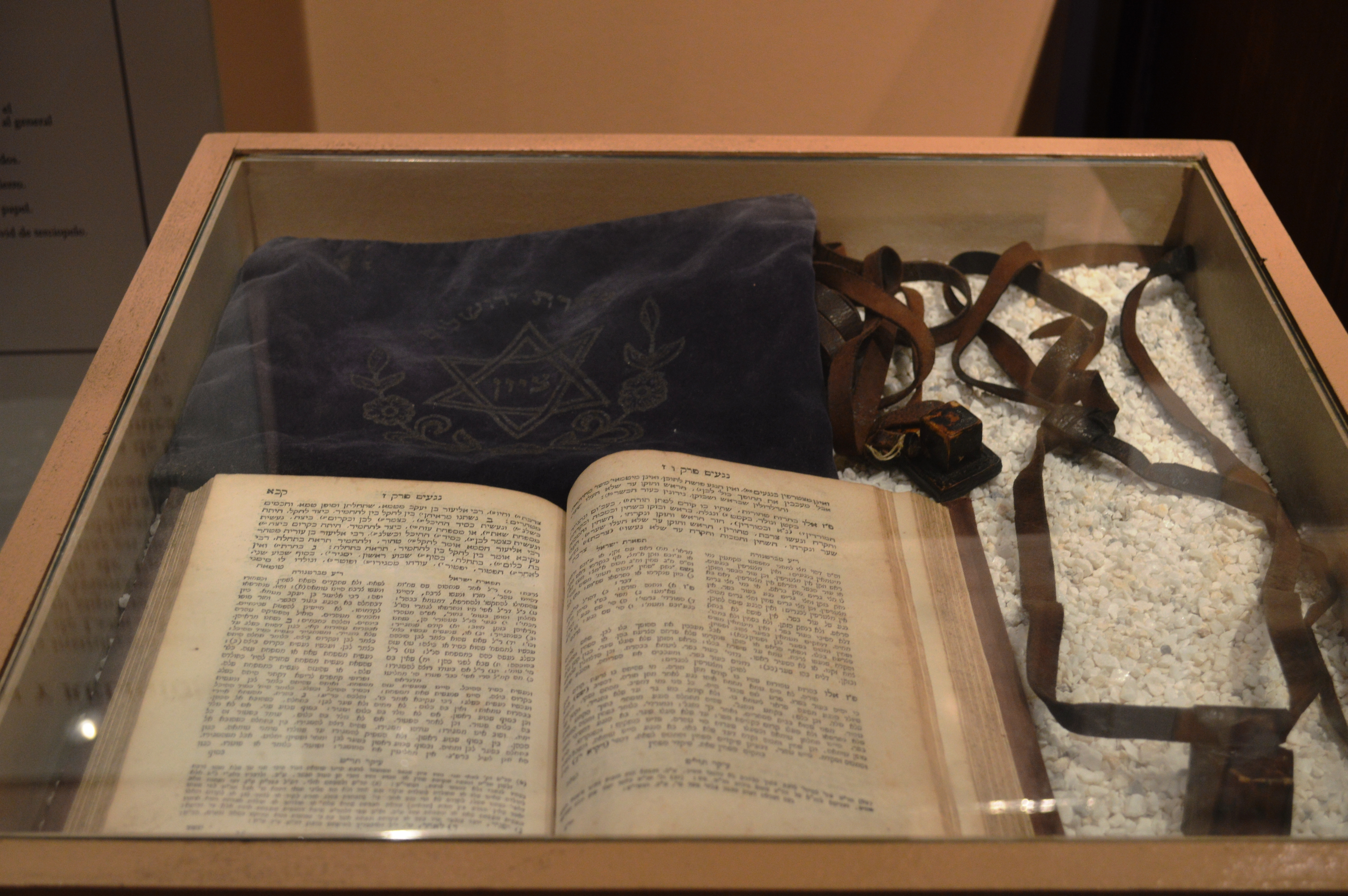
Jewish religious items at the Metropolitan Museum of Monterrey.

With Carvajal as governor, Monterrey was established as the center (now in the state of Nuevo León). Within a few years, some people reported to authorities in Mexico City that Jewish rites were being performed in the Northern Province and efforts to convert heathen indigenous peoples were lax. The principal economic activity of Carvajal and his associates seems to have been capturing Indians and selling them into slavery. Carvajal's Lieutenant Governor, Gaspar Castaño de Sosa, led a large expedition to New Mexico in 1591 in an effort to establish a colony. Castaño was arrested for this unauthorized expedition and sentenced to exile in the Philippines. The sentence was later reversed, but he had already been killed in the Molucca Islands when the Chinese slaves on his ship mutinied.

Governor Carvajal, his immediate family members, and others of his entourage were called to appear before the Inquisition in Mexico City. They were arrested and jailed. The governor subsequently died in jail, prior to a sentence of exile. The rest of the family ended up being implicated for relapsing into Judaism, so they were all executed by burning at the stake, except for one nephew who escaped arrest by fleeing to Italy, and one nephew who was a Dominican friar. His nephew, also named Luis, wrote the earliest-known writings by a Jew in the Americas.

When Carvajal was in office, the city of Monterrey became a destination for other crypto-Jews who wanted to escape the Mexican Inquisition in the south of the territory. Thus, Nuevo León and the founding of Monterrey are significant as they attracted crypto-Jewish migrants from all parts of New Spain. They created one of the earliest Jewish-related communities in Mexico. (The Jewish communities in modern Mexico, which practice their Judaism openly, were not established until the late 19th and early 20th centuries, after considerable immigration of Ashkenazi Jews from eastern Europe, and Mizrahi Jews from Turkey and Syria.)

Isabel de Carvajal was another member of the Carvajal family. Women were important in preserving such practices as "bodily inscriptions", how they ate and dressed, and how to configuring the home to put on a Catholic persona. This created a new idea of matriarchy in the household of crypto-Jewish families in New Spain.

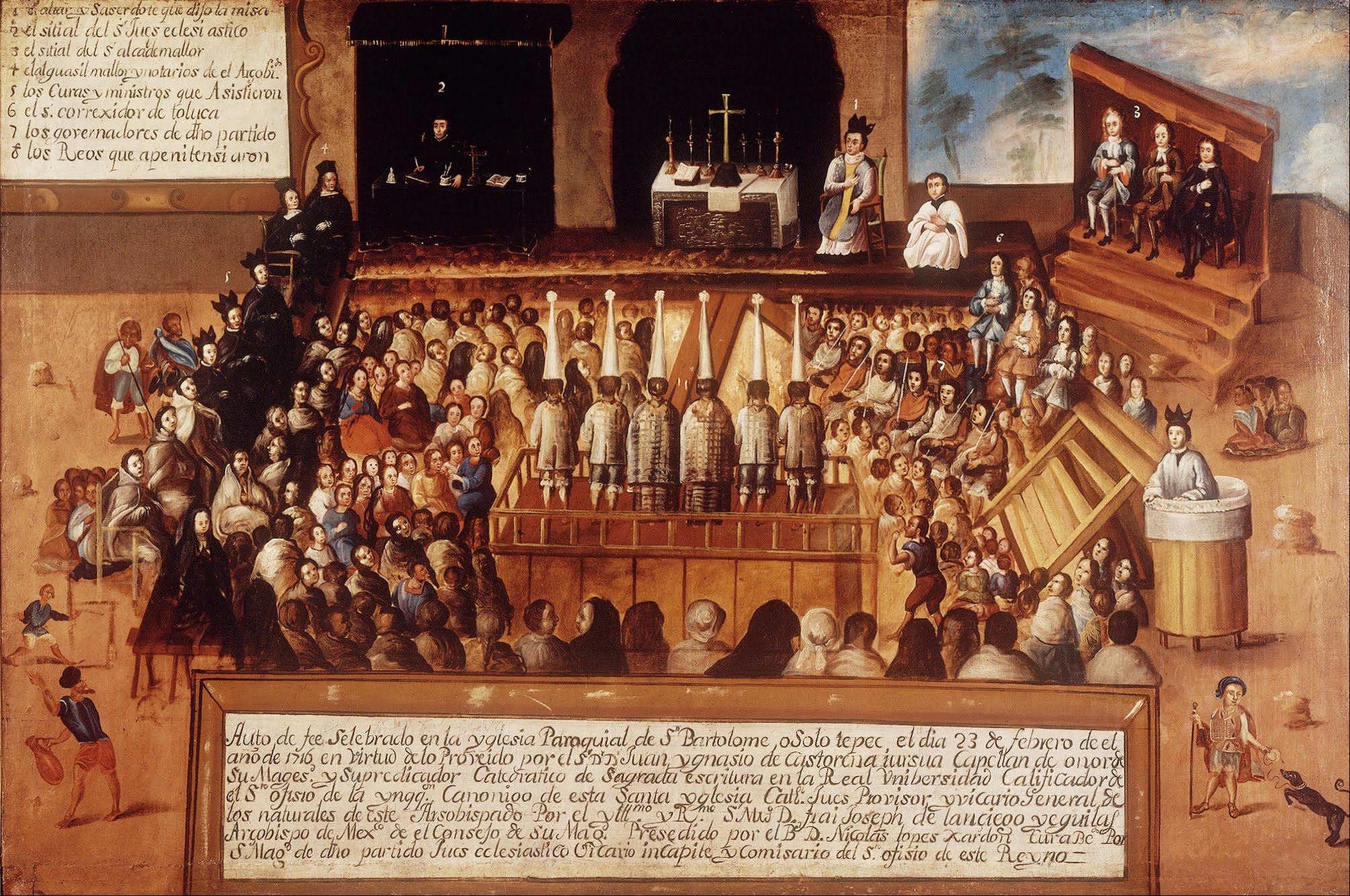
An auto-da-fé in New Spain, 18th century

=== Former New Spain territories in the U.S. Southwest, 17th–18th centuries ===
Due to the Inquisition activities in Nuevo León, many crypto-Jewish descendants migrated to frontier colonies further west, using the trade routes passing through the towns of the Sierra Madre Occidental and Chihuahua, Hermosillo and Cananea, and to the north on the trade route to Paso del Norte and Santa Fe (both cities in the colonial Santa Fe de Nuevo Mexico). Some even traveled to Alta California on the Pacific Coast.

In the late 20th century, in modern-day Southwestern United States specifically New Mexico, which was a former territory of New Spain, several Hispanos of New Mexico have stated a belief that they are descended from crypto-Jews of the colonial period. While most maintain their Roman Catholic and Christian faiths, they often cite as evidence memories of older relatives practicing Jewish traditions. Since the 1990s, the crypto-Jews of New Mexico have been extensively studied and documented by several research scholars, including Stanley M. Hordes, Janet Liebman Jacobs, Schulamith Halevy, and Seth D. Kunin, who calls them Hispanos. Kunin noted that most of this group in New Mexico has not formally embraced Judaism nor joined the organized Jewish community. Though some have been sceptical, such as Folklorist Judith Neulander arguing that people could be referring to traditions of modern Ashkenazi Jews migrants and Evangelical Protestant Christians who purposely acquired and employed Jewish traditions. More recently, Evangelical Protestant Christians have opened missionary groups aimed at cultivating evangelical doctrine in Southwestern American communities where crypto-Judaism had survived. The highly influential Hordes has been charged with "single-minded speculation based on largely ephemeral or highly ambiguous evidence" for his conclusion that modern-day Hispanos who claim crypto-Jewish roots are heirs to an unbroken chain of transmission. Kunin responded to some of this criticism in his book Juggling Identities: Identity and Authenticity Among the Crypto-Jews, in the response Kunin iterated that these scholars were misunderstanding New Mexican identity which, while authentically tied to Christian and Pueblo historicity, is in line with other Spanish converso histories.

=== Colombia ===
In the department of Antioquia, Colombia, as well as in the greater Paisa region, some families also hold traditions and oral accounts of Jewish descent. In this population, Y-DNA genetic analysis has shown an origin of male founders predominantly from "southern Spain but also suggest that a fraction came from northern Iberia and that some possibly had a Sephardic origin". Medellín has a tradition of the marranada, where a pig is slaughtered, butchered and consumed on the streets of every neighborhood each Christmas. This custom has been interpreted as an annual affirmation of the rejection of Jewish law.

=== Bolivia ===
A safe haven destination for Sephardic Conversos during the Spanish colonial era was Santa Cruz de la Sierra. In 1557 many crypto-Jews joined Ñuflo de Chávez and were among the pioneers who founded the city. During the 16th century more crypto-Jews that faced persecution from the Inquisition and local authorities in nearby Potosí, La Paz and La Plata moved to Santa Cruz, as it was the most isolated urban settlement and because the Inquisition did not bother the Conversos there; Some settled in the city of Santa Cruz and its adjacent towns, including Vallegrande, Postrervalle, Portachuelo, Terevinto, Pucará, and Cotoca.

Several of the oldest Catholic families in Santa Cruz are of Jewish ancestry; some families still practice certain traditions of Judaism. As recently as the 1920s, several families preserved seven-branched candlesticks and served dishes cooked with kosher practices. It is still customary among certain old families to light candles on Friday at sunset and to mourn the deaths of close relatives by sitting on the floor. After almost five centuries, some of the descendants of these families acknowledge having some Jewish ancestry, but practice Catholicism.

=== Elsewhere in Latin America ===
In addition to these communities, Roman Catholic-professing communities descended from crypto-Jews are said to exist in the Dominican Republic, Cuba, Jamaica, Puerto Rico and in various other countries of South America, such as Brazil (see Synagogue Kahal Zur Israel in Recife), Argentina, Uruguay, Venezuela, Chile, Peru and Ecuador. From these communities comes the proverb, "Catholic by faith, Jewish by blood".

== In Jewish rabbinical law ==
=== Maimonides ===
As one of the towering figures in Judaism and the author of the Mishneh Torah commentary on the Talmud, Maimonides also issued a landmark doctrinal response to the forced conversions of Jews in the Iberian peninsula by the Almohads:

In his Epistle on Martyrdom, however, Maimonides suggested that the persecuted Jew should publicly adopt Islam while maintaining crypto-Judaism and not seek martyrdom unless forced to transgress Jewish commandments in public. He also excoriated one writer, who advocated martyrdom, for "long-winded foolish babbling and nonsense" and for misleading and hurting the Jews. In a sweeping view of the Jewish past, Maimonides marshals examples of heretics and sinners from the Bible to show that even oppressors of Israel were rewarded by God for a single act of piety or respect. How much greater then, he argues, will be the reward of the Jews "who despite the exigencies of forced conversion perform commandments secretly."

Maimonides championed rationalism over the then-accepted practice of martyrdom when facing religious adversity. This consequently legitimized crypto-Judaism by the religion's standards and provided doctrinal backing for Jews during the centuries of the Spanish Inquisition (1478–1834).

== Notable crypto-Jews ==
- Antonio Fernandez Carvajal was a Portuguese merchant in London; "like other Marranos in London, Carvajal prayed at the Catholic chapel of the Spanish ambassador, while simultaneously playing a leading role in the secret Jewish community, which met at the clandestine synagogue at Creechurch Lane."
- Isabel de Carvajal was a prominent member of the Carvajal family, a notable converted Jewish family. By looking more into her and her story, it can be seen that she was vital for showcasing women's roles of maintaining Jewish identity and practices. This would have involved putting a Catholic front on the home for everyone to see, while practicing Jewish beliefs through food or meeting with other converted women in private to keep their religion alive.
- Isaac Cardoso was a Jewish physician, philosopher, and polemic writer, who was born in Portugal but ultimately settled in Italy. For a time, he went by the name Fernando to evade the Inquisition. After finding safe haven in Verona, he openly embraced Judaism, becoming a leading scholar in Italy.

== See also ==
- Allahdad
- Anusim
- Beta Abraham
- Chala
- Conversos
- Crypto-Christianity
  - Kakure Kirishitan
- Crypto-Islam
- Crypto-paganism
- Crypto-Hinduism
- Doctrine of mental reservation
- Domus Conversorum
- Dönmeh
- Hidden Armenians
- Jewish history
- Jewish visibility
- Judaizers
- Limpieza de sangre
- Marrano
- Morisco
- New Christian
- Relapso
- Sephardic Jews in India
- Who Is A Jew?
- Messianic Judaism
