= Crypto-Christianity =

Secret practice of Christianity

Crypto-Christianity is the secret adherence to Christianity, while publicly professing to be another faith; people who practice crypto-Christianity are referred to as "crypto-Christians". In places and time periods where Christians were persecuted or Christianity was outlawed, instances of crypto-Christianity have surfaced.

== History ==
Various time periods and places have seen large crypto-Christian groups and underground movements. This was usually the reaction to either threats of violence or legal action.

=== Roman Empire ===
Secrecy is a motif which is found in the New Testament, particularly in Mark's Gospel. According to the Gospels, Jesus was concealing his mission or his messianic identity until a certain time, and he ordered his disciples to do the same, for e.g. in Mark 9:9, after the Transfiguration "Jesus gave them orders not to tell anyone what they had seen". This motif has been called "the messianic secret" and it has been interpreted in different ways. According to one interpretation, the historical Jesus wanted to avoid the immediate occurrence of a confrontation with Rome, because the Roman governor Pontius Pilate would not have tolerated the existence of a popular leader who would have referred to himself as the Messiah. There are also theological interpretations, of mixed historical and theological value. The New Testament scholar Bart Ehrman argues that Jesus was executed based on the claim that he was the "King of the Jews" a claim which also signalled the status of "Messiah" (A title of Hebrew origin, given to a promised man who would carry both kingly and religious authority as the anointed leader of Israel). Theologically and politically, the meaning of this title was possibly misunderstood by the Roman authorities.

During the initial development of the Christian Church in the Roman Empire, its members were frequently forced to practice their faith in secrecy. The official policy under Trajan forced Christians to make a choice: they could choose to recant their faith, which meant that they would be allowed to live, or they could choose not to recant their faith, which meant that they would be executed as martyrs. The term crypto-Christianity can be applied to that segment of the church population which concealed its Christian beliefs as a means to avoid persecution. In contrast, many Christians, including Polycarp, chose to retain their beliefs and suffer persecution, due to the fact that Christian doctrine did not allow Christians to publicly profess another religion, even if they held a mental reservation against it, which made it stricter than the Muslim practice of taqiyya and Jewish opinions on the matter, but many did so out of weakness:

All the inhabitants of the empire were required to sacrifice before the magistrates of their community 'for the safety of the empire' by a certain day (the date would vary from place to place and the order may have been that the sacrifice had to be completed within a specified period after a community received the edict). When they sacrificed they would obtain a certificate (libellus) recording the fact that they had complied with the order.

=== Japan ===
Christianity was introduced to Japan during its feudal era by Saint Francis Xavier in 1550. Christianity was banned in 1643 by the Tokugawa bakufu government, which viewed Christianity as disloyal and a threat to their power. Churches were destroyed, known Christians faced forced conversion to Buddhism and all signs of Christian influence were systematically eliminated. The ban was not lifted until 1858.

During this period, converts moved underground into a crypto-Christian group called kakure kirishitan or "hidden Christians". Crypto-Christian crosses and graves, camouflaged to resemble Buddhist imagery, can still be seen in the Shimabara Peninsula, Amakusa islands and far south in Kagoshima. Shūsaku Endō's acclaimed novel Silence draws from the oral history of Japanese Catholic communities pertaining to the time of the suppression of the Church.

=== Ottoman Empire (Balkans and Asia Minor) ===
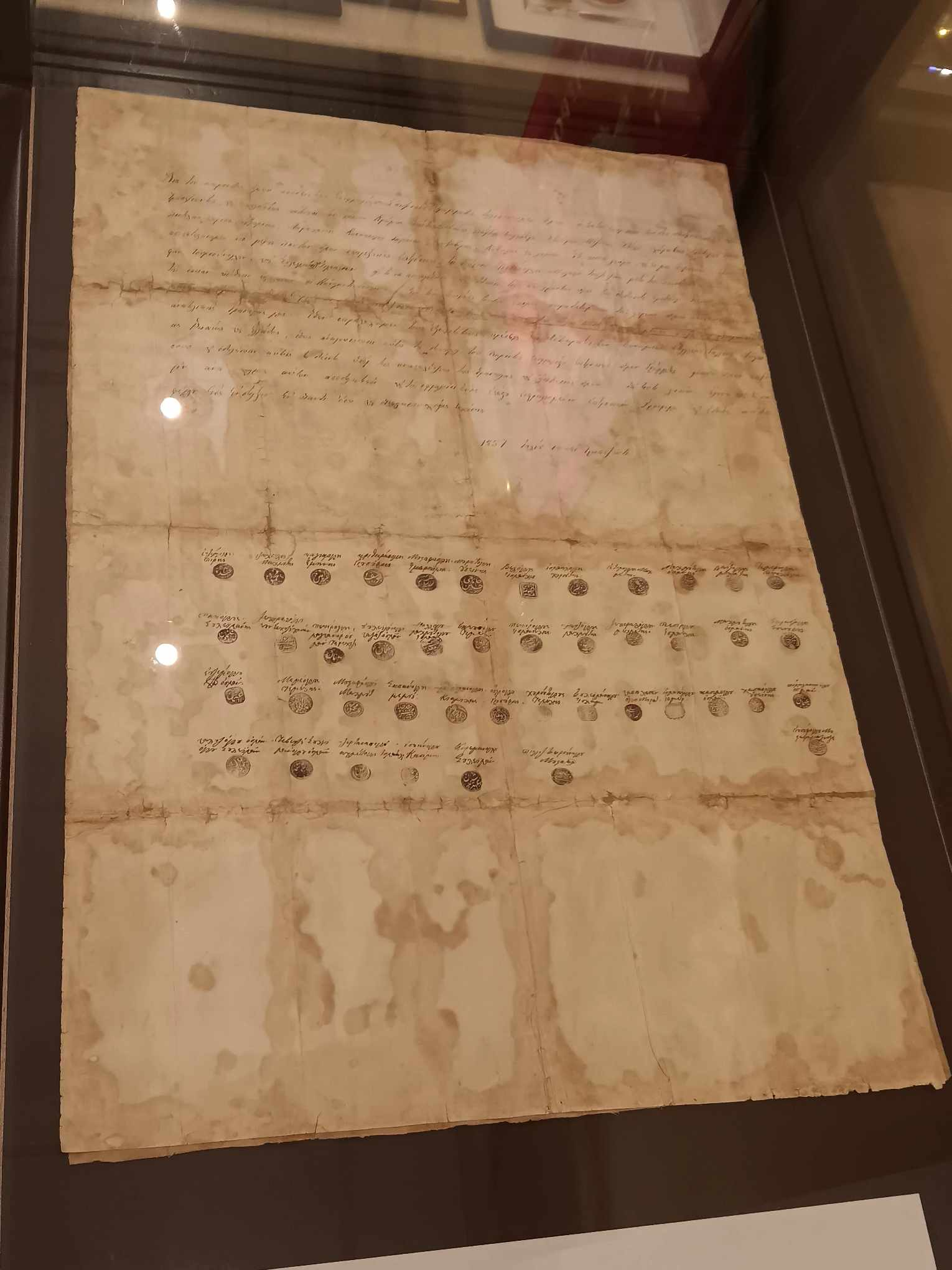
Letter written by a committee of Crypto-Christians, Trabzon, 1857

An early attestation and justification of crypto-Christianism is found in an epistle of Patriarch John XIV (Ιωάννης ΙΔ') (1334-1347) of Constantinople to the Christians of Bithynia (Asia Minor). He says that "those [Christians] who by the fear of punishment [by the Muslims] want to believe and practice Christianity secretly, they will be also saved, provided they study god's orders as far as possible".

Due to the religious strife that has existed in the Balkan Peninsula and Anatolia, instances of crypto-Christian behavior are reported to this day in Muslim-dominated areas of the former Yugoslavia, Albania, and Turkey. (Note: These groups names are: Droverstvo (Serbia), Patsaloi or Linovamvakoi (Cyprus), Laramanoi (Albania), Kouroumlides, Stavriotai, Santaoi, Klostoi (Pontus, Anatolia), Kourmoulides (Crete), Crypto Copts (Egypt), Crypto Maronites (Lebanon)) With the threat of retribution for the religious and ethnic conflicts, many Christian minority groups keep their religion private to protect themselves. Crypto-Christianity was mostly practiced following the Ottoman Turkish conquests of the Balkans, but the earliest scholarly record of the phenomenon dates back to 1829. Linobamvaki in Cyprus traced their ancestry to both Catholics, Maronites and Greek Orthodox Christians who converted under Ottoman oppression. The Laramans in southeastern Kosovo hailed from the northern Albania highlands and converted after settling in the 18th century. Accounts of Crypto-Christian Serbs were documented as early as the 19th century and persisted into the 20th century.

Crypto-Greek Orthodox reportedly lived in many parts of the Ottoman Balkans and Anatolia. A good description of the Crypto-Christians among Pontic Greeks from northeastern Anatolia and the Pontic Alps region (often referred to as Stavriotes), including a bibliography about other parts of the Ottoman Empire, is provided by F. W. Hasluck.

Further information is contained in "The Crypto-Christians of the Pontos and Consul William Gifford Palgrave of Trebizond," London: Valiorum Reprints, 1988, from Peoples and Settlement in Anatolia and the Caucasus 800–1900, by Anthony Bryer.

Crypto-Armenians are believed to represent at least two groups of Armenians which are living in modern-day Turkey. One group has been Islamized under the threat of physical extermination, particularly during the Armenian pogroms of the mid-1890s and the Armenian genocide of 1915. Representatives of a different, much smaller crypto-Armenian group live in separate villages which are inhabited by Turks and Kurds in Eastern Turkey (on the territories of the traditional Armenian homeland). This group differs from the above-mentioned "Islamized" group due to the process and depth of its Islamization.

=== Middle East ===
In the first few centuries the Christian religion spread rapidly around the Mediterranean region with Egypt and Syria becoming especially important centers of the religion. Even as the Roman Empire disintegrated between the 5th and 7th centuries, the Christian faith only deepened in the Eastern Mediterranean. During the 7th century, the Rashidun Caliphate took over what is now called the Middle East. Initially Christianity was well tolerated as Christians were classified as People of the Book, though preferential treatment was given to Muslims. However, often the only actual requirement for being considered a Muslim was to profess a belief in God and proclaim Mohammed as his prophet. As a result, many Egyptians, Syrians, and others in the region officially converted to Islam while still adhering to Christian practices.

As oppression of Christians arose under the Fatimid Caliph Al-Hakim, Christian (and Jewish) practices became more hidden. Secretive communities appeared in Egypt during the 11th century and in Morocco in the 12th century under the Almohads' rule. Many Crypto-Christian communities existed in Middle-East till the 19th century, as Muslim authorities continued to tolerate minimal requirements of obedience by converts. From late 19th century onward, most of crypto-religious groups disappeared as a result of the rise of Muslim nationalism in the new Middle Eastern states.

=== Soviet Russia and the Warsaw Pact ===
Many Christian communities in the Soviet sphere of influence during the Cold War had to go underground in so-called Catacomb Churches. After the break-up of the Warsaw Pact and the end of the Soviet era in the 1990s, some of these groups re-joined the official above-ground churches, but others continued their independent existence, believing the official churches had been irreconcilably tainted by their cooperation with the previous Soviet-supported regimes.

=== People's Republic of China ===
Chinese house churches are unregistered Christian churches in the People's Republic of China which operate independently of the official government-run religious institutions: the Three-Self Patriotic Movement (TSPM) and China Christian Council (CCC) for Protestants, and the Chinese Patriotic Catholic Association for Catholics.

=== Intra-Christian cases ===
In addition to Christians practising their faith secretly in a non-Christian society, there have been instances of crypto-Catholics in majority Protestant, or Protestant-dominated territories and Eastern Orthodox countries. For example, Catholicism was banned and individual Catholics were legally persecuted in England from 1558 onwards. This inspired Recusancy, especially in Ireland. Likewise, Catholicism was suppressed in the Russian Empire, in favour of Eastern Orthodoxy, and in Scandinavia, in favour of Lutheranism.

Crypto-Protestants have sometimes practised in Catholic territories. During the early modern era, this was the case for French Huguenots following revocation of the Edict of Nantes. More recently, Protestants in Eritrea, an Eritrean Orthodox Tewahedo Church-majority country, number about 2% of the population and often practice in secret to avoid persecution and torture from the authorities.

Additionally, historically Eastern Orthodox populations in the Balkans and Eastern Europe that had come under the dominion of various Roman Catholic polities (the Republic of Venice, the Austro-Hungarian Empire, and the Polish-Lithuanian Commonwealth) from the Middle Ages through the Early Modern era were often violently persecuted for not adopting the Catholic faith. Compromises were enacted whereby these formerly Orthodox peoples (such as those in western Ukraine) were permitted to retain their ritual peculiarities on condition of recognizing Papal jurisdiction over their ecclesial affairs (see Uniatism), yet in many cases the faithful maintained their Orthodox identities despite the superficial concessions made by their hierarchs.

== See also ==
- Linobambaki
- Vallahades
- Cretan Turks
- Molla Kabiz
- Crypto-Calvinism
- Crypto-Judaism
- Crypto-Islam
- Crypto-Paganism
- Crypto-Hinduism
- Nicodemite
- Doctrine of mental reservation
- Live and Become
- San Manuel Bueno, Mártir
- Taqiyya
