= Linobambaki =

Crypto-Christian Community in Cyprus

The Linobambaki or Linovamvaki were a Crypto-Christian community in Cyprus, predominantly of Catholic and Greek Orthodox descent who were persecuted for their religion during Ottoman rule. They assimilated into the Turkish Cypriot community during British rule.

== Etymology ==
The word Linobambaki comes from Greek Λινοβάμβακοι, which derives from the combination of the words λινό (lino) "linen" and βαμβάκι (vamvaki) "cotton". The term was used as a metaphor in order to demonstrate that even though they had Latin Catholic origins, they chose to appear outwardly Muslim.

== History ==
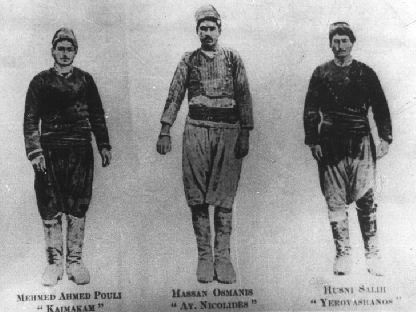
Hassan Pouli (Hasan Bulli), a historical figure in Cypriot folklore

The Ottoman–Venetian War (1570–73) concluded with the remainder of Cyprus under Ottoman rule, and immediately after the war, sanctions were put in place for the Latin population of the island. With Ottoman-Venetian rivalry at its peak, the Ottomans feared the security risk posed by the Latin Catholics of Cyprus, and in particular that they would entice the Venetians to return. As a result, Ottoman tolerance towards the Catholic community was much less than towards the Greek Orthodox community. In addition to political and religious pressure, there was an economic oppression that included removing their rights to own property. The Catholic inhabitants affected by these measures consisted of Latins, Venetians, Genoese, Maronites and Armenians who had converted to Islam in order to circumvent these Ottoman legal precepts. Their artificial and self-serving embrace of the religion led them to eventually earn the name of Linobambaki.

The Linobambaki did not outwardly practice or demonstrate their religious beliefs, due to their faux conversion to curry favour with the Ottomans and the Orthodox communities. Thus in their daily life, they chose to have either one Christian and one Muslim name, or a common name found in both faiths like Ibrahim (Abraham), Yusuf (Joseph) or Musa (Moses). At annual conscription they were often drafted into the Ottoman army, and they avoided paying taxes for non-Muslims. The Linobambaki did not entirely convert to a traditional Muslim life, and only demonstrated religious practices and beliefs that would gain them advantages only afforded to Muslims. For example, they frequently consumed alcohol and pork, and didn't attend religious services; traditions similar to continuing Turkish Cypriot culture today. Many of the Linobambaki villages have Christian saint names that begin with άγιος (ayios), or "saint" to attribute their Latin Catholic origins. Linobambaki's cultural roots and history can be found throughout Turkish Cypriot life and literature. For example, two of the most prominent main characters from Cypriot folklore are "Gavur Imam" and "Hasan Bulli". Linobambaki became a part of the majority of all uprisings and revolts against Ottoman rule, and other local government bodies on the island.

Linobambaki are mentioned by foreign travellers who visited Cyprus before the 20th century. The English historian and traveller William Hepworth Dixon who visited Cyprus in 1878 describes the Linobambaki as a "troublesome but comic element", changing religion from day to day. Fathers pretend that they circumcise their children, and give them names that sound both Muslim and Christian, such as Yacoub, Jousouf and Mousa. He notes that whole villages of "white" Cypriots use these tricks.

=== Settlements ===
Many of the villages and neighbouring areas accepted as Turkish Cypriot estates, were formerly Linobambaki activity centers. These include:

- Agios Andronikos (Yeşilköy)
- Agios Ioannis (Ayyanni)
- Agios Sozomenos (Arpalık)
- Agios Theodoros (Boğaziçi)
- Armenochori (Esenköy)
- Ayios Iakovos (Altınova)
- Ayios Khariton (Ergenekon)
- Dali (Dali)
- Frodisia (Yağmuralan)
- Galinoporni (Kaleburnu)
- Kato Arodes (Aşağı Kalkanlı)
- Tylliria (Dillirga)
- Kritou Marottou (Grit-Marut)
- Limnitis (Yeşilırmak)
- Louroujina (Luricina/Akincilar)
- Melounta (Mallıdağ)
- Potamia (Bodamya)
- Vretsia (Vretça)

== Today ==
The Ottoman Empire's millet system was abolished during British administration. In this period, the people of Cyprus were split into two main groups in censuses and administrative records. Because of the divide and rule policies of the British administration, Linobambaki were integrated into the Turkish Cypriot community. There were still Greek speaking settlements that identified themselves as Turkish Cypriots during the 1950s; settlements such as Lapithos, Platanissos, Agios Symeon and Galinoporni.

== See also ==
- Karamanlides
- Urums
- Vallahades
- Hemshin peoples
- Crypto-Christianity
- Crypto-Christian Serbs
