= Crypto-Christian Serbs =

After Ottoman conquests of Serbian lands in the late 14th century, conversion of Orthodox Christian Serbs began. Konstantin Mihailović (fl. 1455–63), an Ottoman janissary of Serb origin, spoke of Crypto-Christian Serbs in the janissary corps, having been converted as boys through the Devşirme. The first documented evidence of Crypto-Christianity in Serbs comes from an Ottoman Serbian deli (warrior) confessing to a French ambassador at the Ottoman court in 1568. He confesses that he belongs to the Serb nation and faith, that he lives with Turks and simulates himself (as a Muslim), but that he was born as, and in his heart is, a Christian. Religious syncretism in Serb families is documented in Ottoman documents. An 1848 census of Ottoman Novi Pazar shows instances of "one brother believes in Christ, the other in Muhammed", and several ones where the father is Christian and his sons Muslims. In the Sandžak area (historical Raška), even after World War I, some Christian widows remarried Muslims and stayed secret Christians, while being "real Muslims" in society.

Anthropological studies attest Muslim families recalling their slava (patron saint tradition), while some Muslim families in the 19th and 20th century were recorded as still venerating their patron saint and Christmas.

Serbian nationalist historiography have used the existence of religious syncretism and Crypto-Christianity in Bosnia and Herzegovina as proof of the Serb origin of Bosnian Muslims.

In Serbian and South Slavic, the term dvoverstvo (двоверство, "double belief, dual faith") is also used.

== See also ==
- Serb Muslims
- Laramans, Kosovo Albanian Catholics
- Linobambaki, Crypto-Christian Cypriots
