= Crypto-Islam =

Secret adherence to Islam while publicly professing to be of another faith

Crypto-Islam is the secret adherence to Islam while publicly professing to be of another faith; people who practice crypto-Islam are referred to as "crypto-Muslims." The word has mainly been used in reference to Spanish Muslims and Sicilian Muslims during the Inquisition (i.e., the Moriscos and Saraceni and their usage of Aljamiado). With the Portuguese Empire's expansion to the Far East and the Spanish Empire's spread to the Philippines from Latin America, Filipino Muslims and Portuguese Muslims were also subject to the Inquisition, one famous case being Alexo de Castro of the Spanish-occupied Moluccas, who was tried for crypto-Islam a continent away before the Mexican Inquisition.

== Historic examples ==
=== Spain ===
Ahmad ibn Qasim Al-Hajarī, 16th-century crypto-Muslim from Spain who authored a book recounting how he organized his escape from Spain to Morocco, and including a refutation of Catholic opinions about Jesus. The books also included details on crypto-Muslim life in Spain. He later became Ambassador of Morocco to Spain.

The Oran fatwa issued in the context of the persecution of Muslims in Spain gave guidance to crypto-Muslims on how to balance religious obligations with concealing their faith, allowing relaxation of sharia obligations in certain situations.

=== Russia ===
In 16th- to late 18th-century Russia, the native Muslims of the region faced frequent persecution by the authorities, which saw many episodes of forced conversions to Christianity. During these times, the newly converted continued to secretly practice Islam. Once Russia allowed Muslims to practice their faith, many of the converted reverted to Islam.

=== Cham genocide ===
Throughout the Cambodian genocide, the Cham Muslims were religiously persecuted, requiring women to cut their hair short, uncover their heads, desecrate all Qurans and other Islamic prayer items, raise pigs and eat pork, end canonical prayer, and for both men and women to marry non-Muslim spouses.

The Cham people resisted the genocidal measures of the Khmer Rouge by concealing their names, identities, and languages. Women resisted oppression by secretly raising their children and practicing Islam, although many of them were still killed, especially men. They found means to practice rituals despite surveillance, and avoided eating pork while dealing with food scarcity.

== See also ==
- Crypto-Christianity
- Crypto-Judaism
- Crypto-paganism
- Crypto-Hinduism
- Allahdad Massacre
- Chala (Jews)
- Orphans' Decree
- Mashhadi Jews
- Limpieza de sangre
- Oran fatwa
- Taqiya

== Bibliography ==
- Harvey, L. P. (16 May 2005). Muslims in Spain, 1500 to 1614. University of Chicago Press. ISBN 978-0-226-31963-6.
- Rustam Shukurov, "The Crypto-Muslims of Anatolia," in Anthropology, Archeology and Heritage in the Balkans and Anatolia or The Life and Times of F.W. Hasluck (1878-1920), ed. David Shankland, Istanbul: Isis, 2004, volume 2, pages 135–158.
