= Marital conversion =

Religious conversion to facilitate marriage

Marital conversion is religious conversion upon marriage, either as a conciliatory act, or a mandated requirement according to a particular religious belief. Endogamous religious cultures may have certain opposition to interfaith marriage and ethnic assimilation, and may assert prohibitions against the conversion ("marrying out") of one their own claimed adherents. Conversely, they may require the marital conversion of those who wish to marry one of their adherents.

== Christianity ==
=== Catholicism ===
Historically, in the case of the Catholic Church, Catholics were obligated to marry only other Catholics (including those of the Eastern Rite), and marital conversion of the non-Catholic party was considered almost obligatory. However, it was permissible for a Catholic to marry an Independent/Old Catholic (who is not in communion with Rome) or non-Catholic baptized in a manner recognized by the Catholic Church as valid (i.e., mainline Christians such as Episcopalians or Lutherans, and Eastern Orthodox), but a dispensation had to be granted by a bishop and the non-Catholic party had to agree to raise the children as Catholics. Marriage to unbaptized persons, meaning all non-Christians and members of some Christian denominations (such as Unitarians or Mormons), was forbidden. Civil marriage can be the only alternative if a religious wedding is not possible under these circumstances.

=== Iglesia ni Cristo ===
The Iglesia ni Cristo, a non-trinitarian church that is the largest indigenous Christian denomination in the Philippines, requires non-adherents marrying members to convert to the religion prior to the wedding. Conversely, members found to have married outside of the religion are automatically expelled from the church. A church wedding is required after the civil one.

== Islam ==
Islamic law generally permits Muslim men to marry women from the Abrahamic religions without requiring conversion. The rules for women, however, are more restrictive, as many interpretations prohibit Muslim women from marrying non-Muslim men. This restriction is rooted in understandings of male guardianship (Wali), and religious inheritance laws, which prioritize the transmission of Islamic identity through the father. Nevertheless, legal approaches to marital conversion may vary across sects, and their respective legal systems. For instance, the Ja’fari jurisprudence (Shia), allows for a temporary contractual marriage under specific conditions, whereas such unions are not permitted according to Sunni schools. As there are no official conversion rules, Islamic marriage laws are generally guided by traditional interpretations. The only requirement in marriage and conversion is that the children from that marriage be raised as "believers," a common Islamic term for Muslims. The Qur'anic verses generally quoted are:

"And do not marry polytheistic women until they believe. And a believing slave woman is better than a polytheist, even though she might please you. And do not marry polytheistic men [to your women] until they believe. And a believing slave is better than a polytheist, even though he might please you. Those invite [you] to the Fire, but Allah invites to Heaven and to forgiveness, by His permission. And He makes clear His verses to the people that perhaps they may remember." (Qur'an 2:221).

"This day [all] good foods have been made lawful, and the food of those who were given the Scripture is lawful for you and your food is lawful for them. And [lawful in marriage are] chaste (virgin, innocent, clean) women from among the believers and chaste women from among those who were given the Scripture before you, when you have given them their due compensation, desiring chastity, not unlawful sexual intercourse or taking [secret] lovers. And whoever denies the faith - his work has become worthless, and he, in the Hereafter, will be among the losers." (Qur'an 5:5).

Beyond religious doctrine, marital conversion is often a bureaucratic process undertaken for practical reasons rather than purely religious, as it affects personal status rights related to divorce, child custody, and inheritance. In sectarian legal systems, such as Lebanon, individuals may convert strategically to navigate legal constraints. Therefore, some Christians in Lebanon may temporarily convert to Islam to facilitate divorce. Additionally, followers the Ja’fari school within Islam may also convert to other sects, since in the Ja’afari law only the men can finalize a divorce. Conversely, followers of Sunni sects may convert to Shi’ism, as its inheritance laws can be more advantageous for women, granting them a bigger share of inheritance than in Sunni jurisprudence.

== Judaism ==
Jewish views on religious conversion due to intermarriage are largely in opposition to such marriage even if such marriages are tolerated. If a non-Jew wishes to become a Jew, in the sense that they practice Judaism and thus are accepted as a Jew, they are, depending on the Jewish religious tradition, typically welcome. On the other hand, if a Jew desires to leave Judaism, they are regarded as apostates or "assimilators" into a non-Jewish religion or culture. Non-Jewish cultures, tend to be regarded and portrayed as negative; being idolatrous, or rejecting of God (as Jews conceive God).

Some Jewish leaders have controversially referred to Jewish intermarriage as being a "Silent Holocaust," particularly in 20th-21st century America where as many as 47% of American Jews have intermarried with non-Jews in past two decades. Such cultural and religious assimilation is said to represent a slow destruction of the Jewish people. Others have expressed a different view, accepting or tolerating such marriages, instead focusing their attention towards the concept that the children of a Jewish parent be raised Jewish, with some sense of their identity rooted in Judaism and in Jewish culture. However, some children of a Jewish parent were raised in the non-Jewish parent's religion while maintaining a sense of Jewish ethnicity and identity.

== See also ==
- Interfaith marriage
- Interdenominational marriage
- Matrimonial dispensation
- Disparity of cult
- Love jihad
