= Endogamy =

Marrying within a specific ethnic group, class, or social group

Endogamy is the cultural practice of only marrying within a specific social group, religious denomination, caste, or ethnic group, rejecting any from outside of the group or belief structure as unsuitable for marriage or other close personal relationships. Its opposite, exogamy, describes the cultural practice of marriage outside of the group.

Endogamy is common in many cultures and ethnic groups. Several religious and ethnic religious groups are traditionally more endogamous, although sometimes relationships outside of the group occur with the added dimension of requiring marital religious conversion. This permits an exogamous marriage, as the convert, by accepting the partner's religion, becomes accepted within the endogamous group. Endogamy may result in a higher rate of recessive gene–linked genetic disorders.

== Adherence ==
Endogamy can encourage sectarianism and serves as a form of self-segregation. For instance, a community resists integration or completely merging with the surrounding population. Minorities can use it to stay ethnically homogeneous over a long time as distinct communities within societies that have other practices and beliefs.

The isolationist practices of endogamy may lead to a group's extinction, as genetic diseases may develop that can affect an increasing percentage of the population. However, this disease effect would tend to be small unless there is a high degree of close inbreeding, or if the endogamous population becomes very small in size.

== Social dynamics ==
The Urapmin, a small tribe in Papua New Guinea, practice strict endogamy. The Urapmin also have a system of kinship classes known as tanum miit. Since the classes are inherited cognatically, most Urapmin belong to all of the major classes, creating great fluidity and doing little to differentiate individuals.

The small community on the South Atlantic island of Tristan da Cunha are, because of their geographical isolation, an almost endogamic society. There are instances of health problems attributed to endogamy on the island, including glaucoma and asthma as research by the University of Toronto has demonstrated.

== Genealogy ==
Endogamic marriage patterns may increase the frequency of various levels of cousin marriage in a population, and may cause high probability of children of first, second, third cousins, etcetera.

If a cousin marriage has accrued in a known ancestral tree of a person, in historical time, it is referred to as pedigree collapse. This may cause relations along multiple paths between a person's autosomal-DNA matches. It creates stronger DNA matches between the DNA matches than expected from the nearest path.

Cousin marriage should not be confused with double cousins, which do not cause a pedigree collapse. Certain levels of sibling marriage and cousin marriage is prevented by law in some countries, and referred to as consanguinity.

A long term pattern of endogamy in a region may increase the risk of repeated cousin marriage during a long period of time, referred to as inbreeding. It may cause additional noise in the DNA autosomal data, giving the impressions that DNA matches with roots in that region are more closely related than they are.

== Examples ==
Examples of ethnic and religious groups that have typically practiced endogamy include:

- Aari - An Ethiopian highland group with three castes who at 4500 years show the longest known continuous practice of endogamy
- Alawites
- The Amish of North America
- Various Arab tribes
- Assyrians, indigenous Christian people of upper Mesopotamia
- Armenians have a history of endogamy due to being almost entirely surrounded by Islamic neighbours while being a strongly Christian nation.
- Pamiris (Badakhshanis) of Tajikistan prefer endogamy due to being a Badakhshani-speaking (Pamiri languages considered to be endangered) and Ismaili Muslim minority surrounded by Sunni Tajik/Dari speaking majority, as well as by Kyrgyz and Chinese.
- Békés
- Ceylon Moors up to the British era.
- Coptic Christians
- Daylamites, an ethnic group living south of the Caspian Sea in ancient and medieval Persia
- Druze
- European royalty of Spain (namely Habsburgs and Borbón)
- Fulani
- Galinoporni, a village in Northern Cyprus, where it is said that everybody is related
- Gitanos typically practice endogamy within their raza, or patrigroup.
- Greek Cypriots usually practice endogamy in order to maintain their status as the majority ethnic group on the island of Cyprus.
- Irish Travellers
- Judaism traditionally mandates religious endogamy, requiring that both marriage partners be Jewish, while allowing for marriage to converts. Orthodox Judaism maintains the traditional requirement for endogamy in Judaism as a binding, inherent part of Judaism's religious beliefs and traditions.
- Kalash
- Lepcha, an ethnic group in India, Nepal, and Bhutan.
- Mandaeans
- Members of the Church of Jesus Christ of Latter-day Saints or other religious and/or cultural groups relating to Mormonism
- Parsis
- Jats
- Rajputs
- Samaritans
- Sardinians, especially in the Province of Ogliastra
- Sayyids
- Sentinelese, an uncontacted indigenous tribe inhabiting North Sentinel Island in the Andaman and Nicobar Islands.
- Syrian Christians of Kerala, India – but marital conversion is allowed.
- The Serer people of the Senegambia region (Senegal, Gambia, Guinea-Bissau, and Mauritania), who are an ethnoreligious group and nation, practice endogamy as mandated by A ƭat Roog (Serer spirituality) and Serer culture. They usually marry among themselves or within other Serer sub-groups. This is particularly true for the Serer-Noon who do not marry out. Anthropologist and senior lecturer in Social and Cultural Anthropology, Dr Pauline Aligwekwe writes:

"Endogamy of cast had more of a peculiar character. It was normally practiced in order to satisfy what was described as the "pride and the safety" of the purity of blood of the group. Endogamy within kinship group or even within a lineage was also given similar reasons. The Peuhl and the Serer of Senegal are typical examples of where kinship endogamy was practiced."

- The Vaqueiros de alzada of Spain
- Yazidis

== See also ==
- Anti-miscegenation laws
- Arranged marriage
- Assortative mating
- Consanguinity
- Ethnic nationalism
- Ethnoreligious group
- Founder effect
- Genealogical DNA test
- Interfaith marriage
- Jāti
- Miscegenation

Cousin marriage:

- Cousin marriage
- Marriages and gotras
- List of coupled cousins

Marriage systems:

- Exogamy
- Homogamy
- Hypergamy
