= Crypto-Hinduism =

Secret adherence to Hinduism while publicly professing to be of another religion

Crypto-Hinduism is the secret adherence to Hinduism while publicly professing to be of another faith; practitioners are referred to as "crypto-Hindus" (from Greek kryptos - κρυπτός, 'hidden'). Crypto-Hinduism was observed during a period of forced religious conversions in South Asia, as well as suspected against Hindus who were forcibly converted to the religion of the invaders or colonizers. Many crypto-Hindus were arrested for practicing Hinduism after professing to have converted to Christianity, some sentenced to death for being a crypto-Hindu such as in colonial Portuguese Goa.

== Islamic sultanates ==
Some Hindus who joined official positions in Delhi Sultanate were accused of following Hinduism in secret. For example, states Bardwell Smith, Khusru Khan, a convert from Hinduism to Islam and an army commander who led plunder raids against Deccan kingdoms, was towards the end of his life "accused by Turkish nobles of harboring crypto-Hindu tendencies, a false charge but one which reflected genuine factional divisions and prejudices within the Muslim ruling class". According to Aziz Ahmad, Arabic Islamic scholars have considered the form of Islam followed in Bengal (Bangladesh, West Bengal) to have elements of crypto-Hinduism and have attempted to reform it to more strict adherence to the version found in the Arabian peninsula.

== Goa Inquisition ==
Crypto-Hinduism by Goan Catholic converts was a criminal offence in Portuguese Goa from 1560 to 1821. Some native Goans were accused, arrested and tried for being crypto-Hindus. Those accused of it were imprisoned and depending on the criminal charge, could even be sentenced to death if convicted.

Like the Spanish Inquisition and the Portuguese Inquisition before it, the original targets behind the creation of the Goa Inquisition were falsely-converted Sephardic Jews and North African Muslims who had emigrated to Goa from the Iberian peninsula, while lying about being Catholic. These two communities were perceived as a security threat due to their established reputation for joining forces to overthrow Christian rulers in the Iberian peninsula. Of the 1,582 persons convicted between 1560 and 1623, 45.2% were convicted for offenses related to Judaism and Islam.

A compilation of the auto-da-fé statistics of the Goa Inquisition reveal that a total of 57 persons were burnt in the flesh and 64 in effigy (i.e. a statue resembling the person). All the burnt were convicted as relapsed heretics or for sodomy.

== Pakistan ==
During the partition of India, many Punjabi Hindus and Mazhabi Sikhs converted to Christianity in order to escape anti-Hindu and Sikh violence. These communities still maintain many of their original religious beliefs and practices despite the change in religion. Despite partition, religious syncretism remains present in the country, with some Muslim devotees continuing to visit shrines dedicated to Hindu and Sikh saints. The Christian portion of the population is highest in areas of Pakistan near to Sikh-settled areas across the border in India, an indication of converted Mazhabi Sikhs. According to a report, the practice of Hindus hiding their religion by having an Islamic name to be used in public and a Hindu name to be used privately is practiced in Islamabad. During his stay in Pakistan, Ajit Doval recollected his encounter with a Hindu who was publicly living the life of a maulvi.

== Indonesia ==
Many followers of Kejawèn, a syncretic tradition that contains animistic, Buddhist, Hindu and Sufi traditions, had officially identified as followers of Islam on government issued ID cards prior to the recognition of the faith in 2018. The faith maintains some characteristics of Esoteric Buddhist and Hindu traditions.

== See also ==
- Crypto-Christianity
- Crypto-Judaism
- Crypto-Islam
