= Laramans =

Term for Albanian crypto-Christians

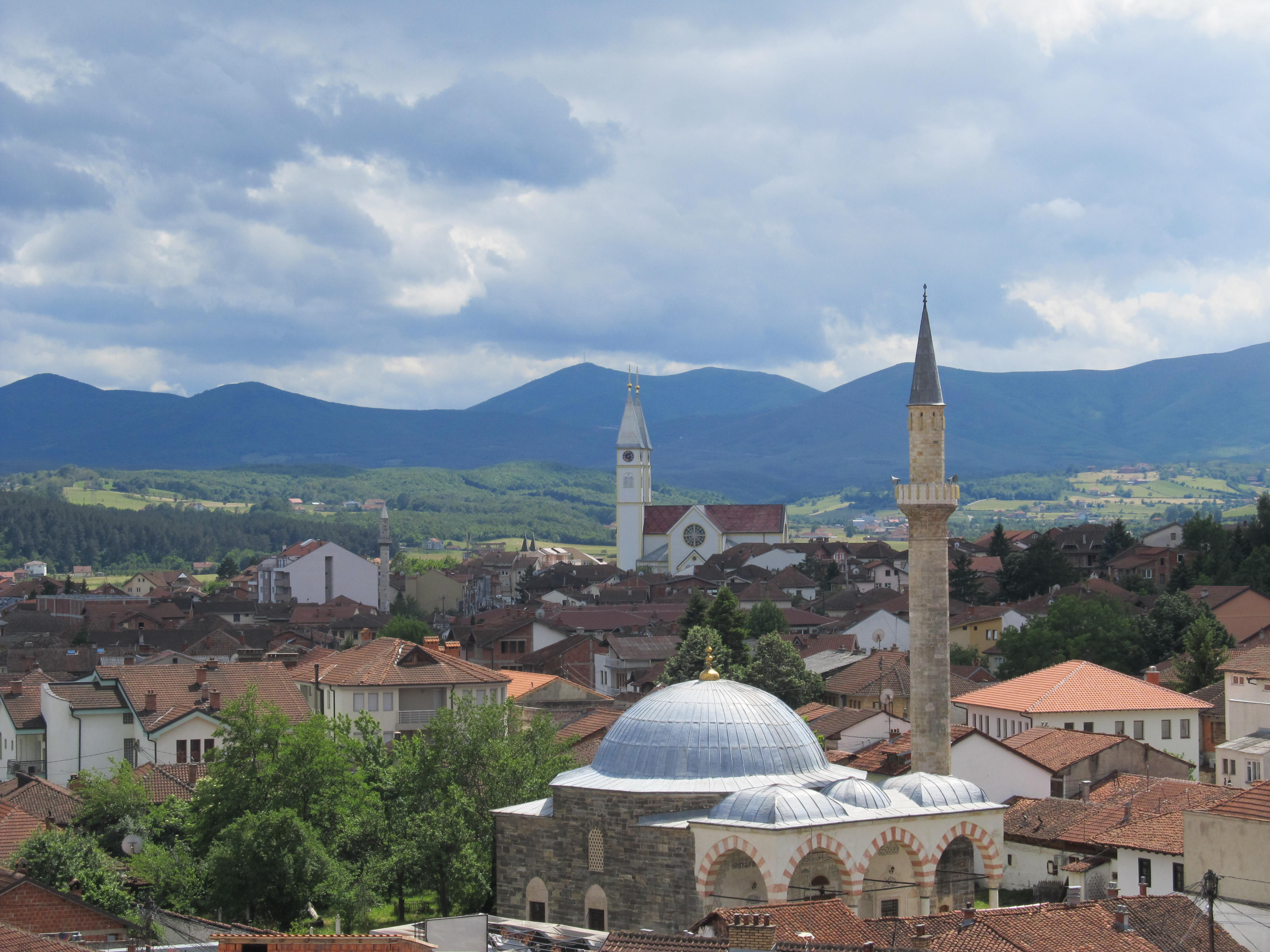
Church and mosque in Gjakova, where many laramans lived

The term Laraman in Albanian refers to crypto-Christians who adhered to Islam officially but continued to practice Christianity within the household during the Ottoman era. It was derived from the Albanian adjective i larmë, meaning "variegated, motley, two-faced", a metaphor of "two-faithed" (l'arë), a reference to the Laramans following both Christianity (in secret) and Islam (nominally).

The phenomenon was widespread in the mid to late Ottoman era among both northern and southern Albanians, and arose after half-hearted conversions in the contexts of anti-Christian persecution, to avoid payment of poll taxes, and to obtain worldly advantages such as government employment. While the Orthodox church typically tolerated crypto-Christians among its flocks, Catholic policy varied by place and time between having priests travel to laraman houses in secret, and categorically refusing anyone who called themselves Muslim in public sacraments. Legally, laraman individuals were considered as Muslims by the Ottoman state with regards to the millet system whereby citizens of different confessions existed in different legal categories. Laraman individuals often bore two names, one Muslim and Christian, and observed a mix of Christian and Muslim rituals.

Over time, many laraman communities became entirely Muslim. In the nineteenth centuries, various laraman communities, especially crypto-Catholics in Kosovo, openly declared their Christianity, and demanded to be legally once again recognized as Christians by the Ottoman state. While in some cases this request was granted, the laramans of Stublla were persecuted when they refused to "return" to Islam, and deported to Anatolia, until Ottoman authorities allowed their return while under Great Power pressure. In some regions of Kosovo and Central Albania, there were communities that remained laraman in the twentieth century, and in the 21st century, there are some cases in Kosovo where individuals claiming a laraman background have formally joined (or "returned to") the Catholic community.

Today, the laraman phenomenon remains incompletely understood. While some experts as well as some church officials regard the laramans as remaining entirely Christian in beliefs while professing Islam due to necessity, and others have pointed to practical considerations underpinning the phenomenon. Others have noted the existence of individuals who believed equally in both Christianity and Islam. The laraman heritage has come to symbolize in Kosovo the perception of having a "Western" identity despite integration into the "Eastern" Ottoman system.

== History ==
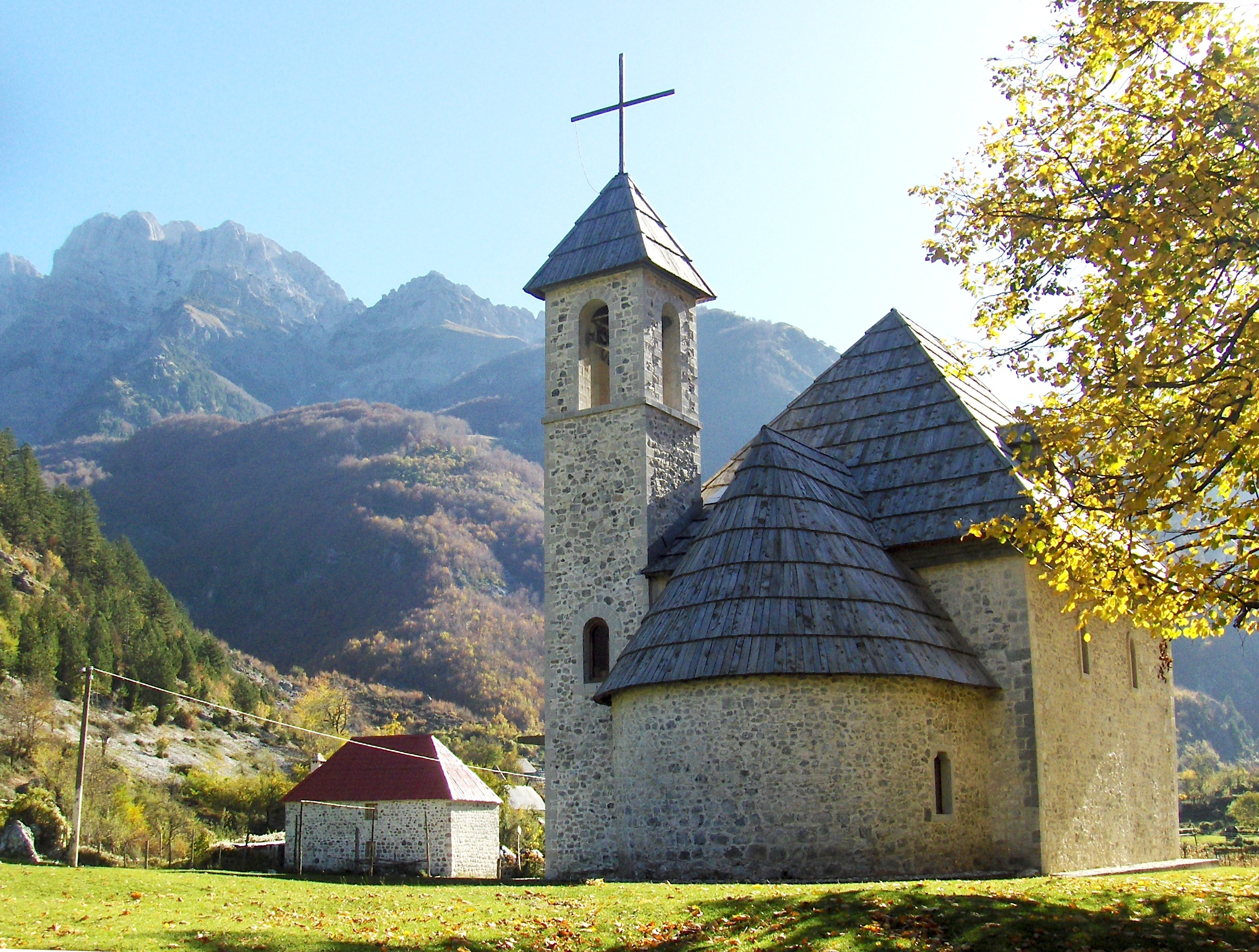
Highland church in Theth, a town founded by Catholics to preserve their faith during a time of pressures

In the 1600s, the Ottomans organized a concerted campaign of Islamization that was not typically applied elsewhere in the Balkans, in order to ensure the loyalty of the rebellious Albanian population. Although there were certain instances of violently forced conversion, usually this was achieved through economic incentives – in particular, the head tax on Christians was drastically increased. While the tax levied on Albanian Christians in the 1500s amounted to about 45 akçes, in the mid-1600s, it was 780 akçes.

Conversion to Islam was also aided by the dire state of the Catholic church in the period, which was understaffed with often illiterate priests. While in the first decade of the 17th century, Central and Northern Albania remained firmly Catholic (according to Vatican reports, Muslims were no more than 10% in Northern Albania), by the middle of the 17th century, 30–50% of Northern Albania had converted to Islam, while by 1634 most of Kosovo had also converted. The failed 1645 plot by Venice to seize Shkodër with the aid of local Catholics was followed by a wave of anti-Catholic persecution which saw increased conversion as well as flight of the Albanian population into Venetian-controlled Dalmatia. After another pro-Venetian insurrection in 1649 was crushed by the Ottoman army, another wave of persecution and apostasy followed, and Catholic missionaries were forced to leave Albania.

=== Crypto-Catholicism ===
During this rapid decrease in the Catholic population of Albania due to conversions to Islam, Crypto-Catholicism emerged. The first concrete evidence of Crypto-Christianity among Albanians dates to 1610, although it certainly existed before this. It was attested by Marino Bizzi, the Catholic Archbishop of Antivari, who had jurisdiction over Albania, who traveled to a village called Kalevaç, near Durrës, and reported that the village's sixteen houses were "Moslem" but nevertheless had a priest because all the wives were Christian. Bizzi was approached by a man who professed Islam, but told him that in his heart he still held the Christian faith, and wanted to live and die in it. Bizzi noted that this was one of many such cases, and within Ottoman territories, this was above all widespread in Albania, where entire villages had apostatized to avoid paying the poll tax.

Malcolm notes one early 1637 report from Fra Cherubino, working as part of a Franciscan mission, which notes a household where Catholicism, Islam, and Orthodox Christianity were all practiced, and that clan (fis) and other familial relationships were more socially important than religious differences, with various clans including Krasniqi, Thaçi, and Berisha. (Note: As reported to Cherubino, the Thaçi had three branches: one Catholic, one Muslim, and one consisting of Catholics who did not eat pork. and Berisha being divided between Catholicism and Islam without any internal tension at all.) In the 1930s and 1940s, there continued to be significant numbers of Albanian extended households in Kosovo of mixed Catholic and Muslim faiths; at feast days, Catholics traditionally refrained from consuming pork or wine out of consideration for their Muslim brethren, but both drank raki.

==== Catholic policy ====
Skendi notes that for a while, the issue of whether sacraments should be administered to laramans caused an "acute controversy" within the church hierarchy. He notes that for a while, successive archbishops of Skopje had held that priests should be allowed to administer sacraments to the laramans, and give them "all the assistance they needed".

===== Kuvendi i Arbënit =====
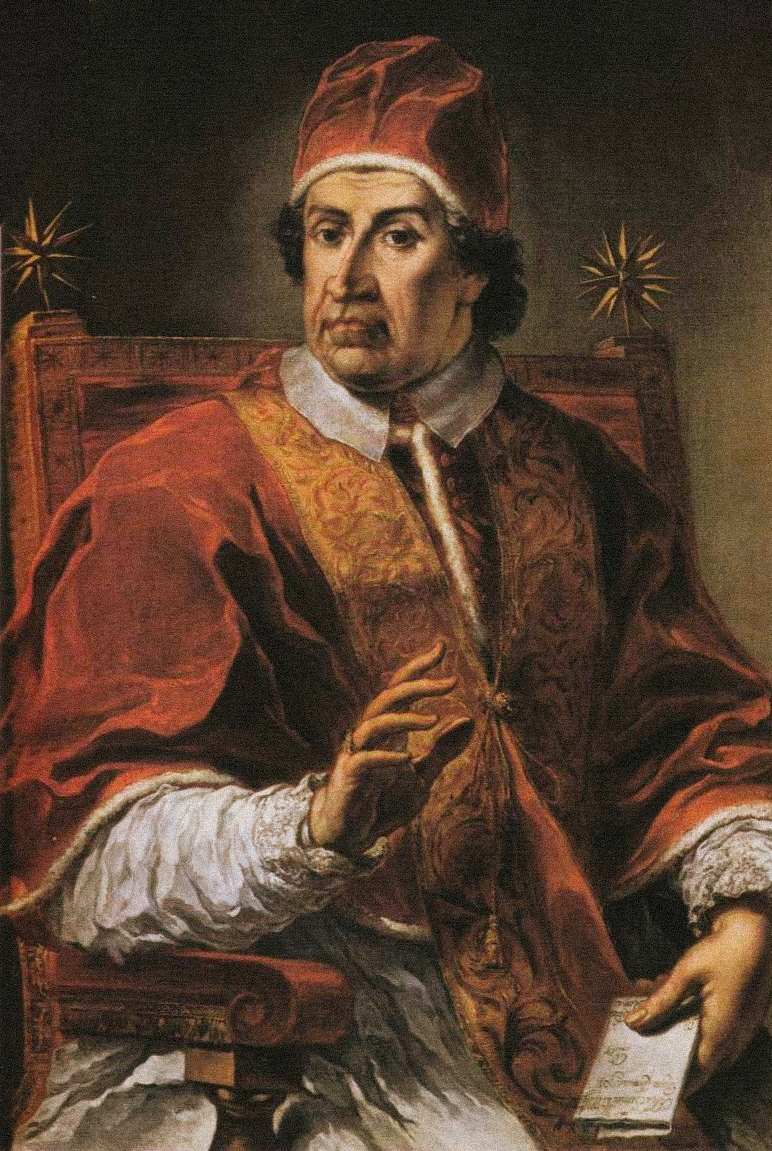
Pope Clement XI was the Pope from 1700 to 1721. He was born to the noble family of Albani of Italian and Albanian origin, and convened the Kuvendi i Arbënit to halt the wave of conversions to Islam and Eastern Orthodoxy.

In 1700, the Papacy passed to Pope Clement XI, who was himself of Albanian-Italian origins and held great interest in the welfare of his Catholic Albanian kinsmen, and would become known for composing the Illyricum sacrum. Fearing that before long there would be no more Christians left in his Albanian ancestral homeland, in 1703 he convened the Albanian Council (Kuvendi i Arbënit) in order to find ways to prevent further apostasy in Albania, and preserve the existence of Catholicism in the land. The Provincial Church Council met in the city of Lezha in northern Albania, in 1703, in order to put an end to the controversy about sacraments to laramans. The council, or Kuvend ("convention") as it became known in Albanian, ordered that those who outwardly acted as Muslims but were privately Christians—especially those who publicly ate meat on fast days and bore obviously Muslim names—would need to publicly abjure Islam and declare their Christianity, or else they would be barred from receiving sacraments.

===== Benedict XIV =====
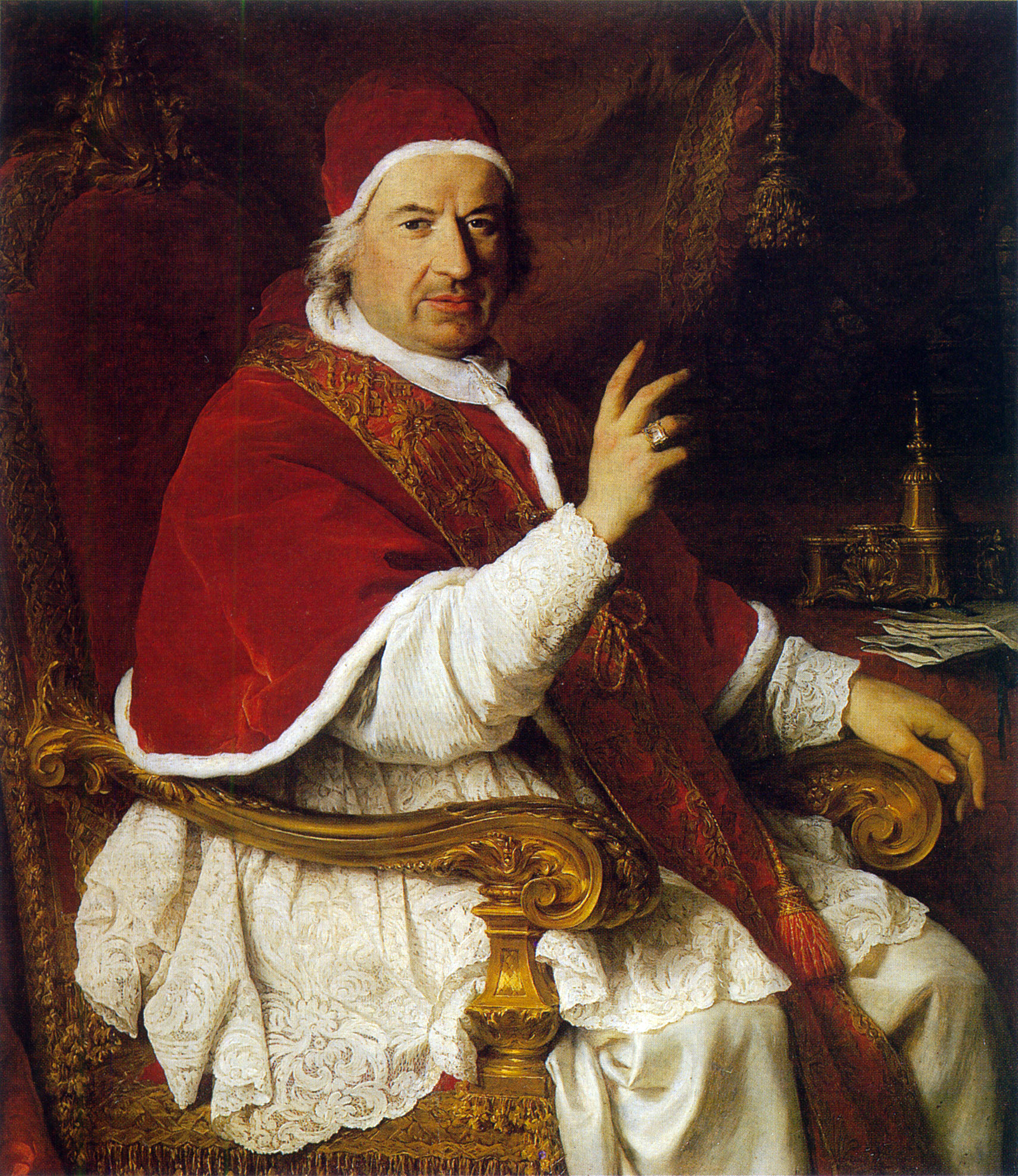
Pope Benedict XIV decreed that sacraments were to be restricted to Catholics who publicly declared their faith, but his decree may have had the unintended effect of turning many Crypto-Catholics into true Muslims

In 1743, Apostolic Visitor Nikolic reported to Pope Benedict XIV on the situation of the "church of Serbia", which Skendi notes was the diocese territory of Prizren and Skopje, and "in various ways linked to Albania proper", especially since the population was mostly Albanian and had been under the jurisdiction of Antivari". Nikolic noted that there were thousands of "secret Catholics" in "Serbia and Albania", and that although provincial synods and the Propaganda Fide agreed that such Catholics could not partake in sacraments, bishops and missionaries were still allowing them to. Nikolic feared that the situation would ultimately turn them "heart and soul" over to Islam, and he requested that the Pope issue an order "chiaro e chiarissimo" that the sacraments would be withheld from such Christians; Benedict XIV did just that on 2 February 1744. Nonetheless, the Pope's decree did allow priests to baptize the children of Crypto-Christians specifically when they were about to die.

Skendi notes that Benedict XIV's decree did not bring about its intended effects. Far from returning to Christianity, the Crypto-Christians became furious, and became bitter opponents of those who were still publicly Catholic, "whom they persecuted more than did the Moslems themselves".

==== Western Macedonia ====
In 1568, a fatwa was made stipulating harsh punishments for those who outwardly professed Islam but secretly continued to be Christian.

==== Suhareka ====
In 1650, Gregorius Massarechius (Gregor Mazrreku) of the Catholic mission in the area of Prizren reported that the 160 Christian houses of Suhareka had all become Muslim while some 36-37 women had remained Christian, with locals telling him that "in our hearts we are Christians; we have only changed names [i.e. adopted Muslim names] in order not to pay taxes imposed by the Turks". The locals told Massarechius that they wanted him to come to them in secret for confessions and for communion. Reportedly, the Islamized Catholics only married Christian girls, because they did not want "the name Christian" to vanish from their houses.

==== Great Turkish War ====
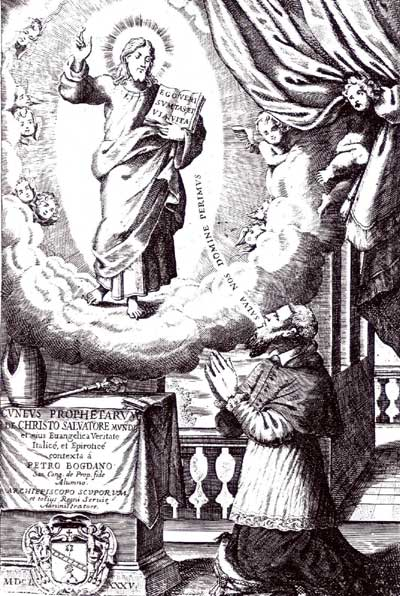
Pjeter Bogdani, depicted, was a Catholic Albanian intellectual who led an ill-fated pro-Austrian Albanian uprising in the late 17th century, after which large scale deportation and forced conversion, a side effect of which was the growth of the laraman population

During the Great Austro-Turkish War, Albanian Catholic leaders Pjetër Bogdani and Toma Raspasani rallied Kosovo Albanian Catholics and Muslims to the pro-Austrian cause, and they aided the Venetian general Daniele Delfino. Harsh reprisals followed the retreat of the Austrian and Venetian armies. Large numbers of Catholics fled north where many "died, some of hunger, others of disease" around Budapest. After the flight of Serbs, in 1690, the Pasha of Ipek (Albanian Peja, Serbian Pec) forced Catholic Albanians in the North to move to the newly depopulated plains of Southern Serbia, and forced them to convert to Islam there.

==== Vitina ====
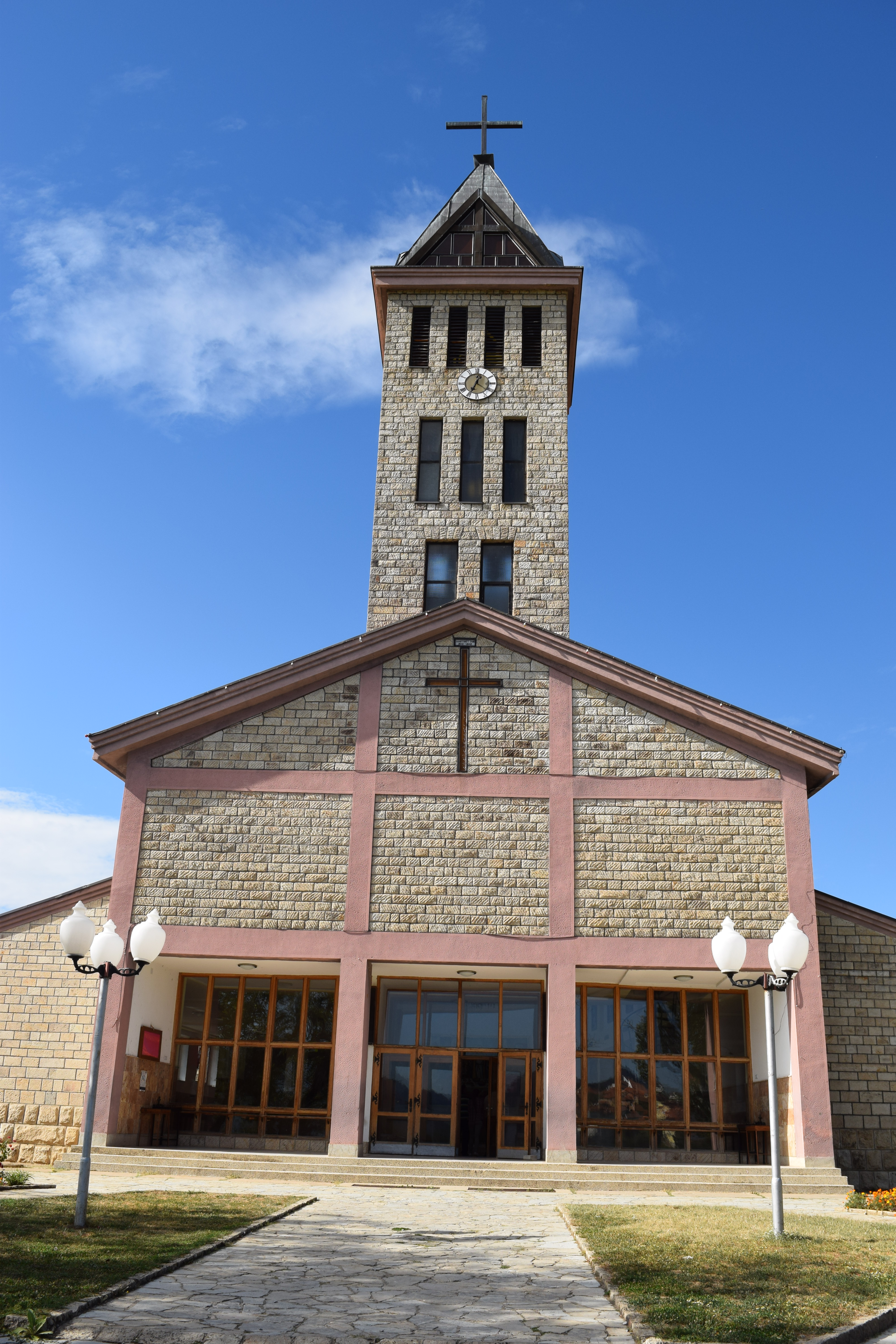
Roman Catholic church in Stublla.

An ethnic Albanian crypto-Catholic community of laramans existed in Ottoman-era southern Kosovo, inhabiting the historical parish of Letnica, centered in Stublla (Vitina municipality). The community originated from Roman Catholic Albanian migrants from the northern Albania highlands who had settled in Kosovo in the beginning of the 18th century, who converted into Islam in order to secure supreme position in relation to the local Serbs. According to Albanian Catholic priests and church historians, they were only nominal Muslims, having converted in order to escape repression or avoid paying Christian taxes (jizya, etc.).

Efforts to convert the community back to Catholicism began in 1837; however, the effort was violently suppressed – the local Ottoman governor put laramans in jail. After crypto-Catholics in Prizren, Peja and Gjakova were recognized as Catholics by the Ottoman Grand Vizier in 1845, twenty-five laramans in the parish of Letnica went to Gjilan (which was the district capital) to persuade the governor and sharia court judge to recognize them as Catholics; the governor refused, and tried to persuade them to change their minds. When they said they were in fact Catholics, he imprisoned them in Skopje and Constantinople.

A few months later, they returned with an official ferman recognizing them as Catholics, but they were instead imprisoned again. Because the Muslim elite in Kosovo feared their shift to Catholicism could have a domino effect, as a deterrent, they were deported in the winter and spring of 1845 and 1846 to Anatolia, where many of them died.

They were brought home in November 1848 following diplomatic intervention by the Great Powers. In 1856, Tanzimat reforms improved the situation, and no further serious abuse was reported. The bulk of reversion of Laramans back to open Catholicism took place between 1872 and 1924. The Slovenian bishop Ivan Franjo Gnidovec (bishop of Skopje 1924–1939) invested energy into the area and built a church in Dunav, a crypto-Catholic center in the Karadag; furthermore, the local Catholics tried to help the remaining laramans in their formal conversion to Catholicism. Difficulties arose due to the opposition of both the local Muslims and the Yugoslav authorities.

Today, there are Catholic descendants of those laramans who survived the episode in Anatolia living in and around Stublla. Many of them are recognizable by their Islamic surnames. As part of the laraman legacy, Catholic Albanians in Stublla still wear the dimije, harem trousers that are typically worn only by Muslim women, among other "Muslim-like" habits.

==== Dukagjin ====
In the late Ottoman period, the town of İpek (modern Pejë/Peć) had crypto-Christians who were of the Catholic faith.

In the mid 18th century, Crypto-Catholics were widespread especially around Peja, Gjakova, and Prizren. A number of crypto-Catholics in Peja, Gjakova, and Prizren were granted official recognition as Catholics in 1845 by the Ottoman Grand Vizier.

=== Crypto-Orthodoxy ===
In the late 17th and 18th centuries, especially after numerous rebellions including during the Great Turkish War and subsequent clashes with Orthodox Russia, Ottoman rulers also made concerted efforts to convert the Orthodox Albanians of Southern and Central Albania (as well as neighboring regions of Greece and Macedonia). Like in the North, conversion was achieved through a diverse motley of violent, coercive and non-coercive means, but raised taxes were the main factor.

==== Sulova ====
Crypto-Orthodoxy existed in and around Dragot within Sulova (in Elbasan district) until the early 18th century, after which the inhabitants became Muslims in practice as well as in name. The village of Dragot itself converted completely to Islam in the beginning of the 18th century.

==== Tropoja ====
In Tropoja, a crypto-Christian population that was not Catholic but Orthodox existed until the end of the 18th century. A large Catholic minority remains in Tropoja still today.

==== Shpati ====
In the region of Shpati in Elbasan district, Crypto-Orthodoxy was established, and survived. The presence of crypto-Christians can be detected by the discrepancy between the statistics of the Ottoman government and the Patriarchate: the Patriarchate counted thirty eight Christian villages and five Muslim villages, but the Ottomans counted twenty Muslim villages. Crypto-Orthodox individuals would often go by two names, as was the case with the Crypto-Christian Shpatarak Albanian patriot Josif Qosja (an Orthodox forename) also known as Isuf Qosja (a Muslim forename). The last traces of Crypto-Christianity were noticed in the aftermath of World War I, and were gone by World War II.

==== Chamëria ====
The process of Islamization of the Chams (the population of Chameria) started in the 16th century, but it reached major proportions only in the 18th and 19th centuries. According to the population census (defter) of 1538, the population of the region was almost entirely Orthodox, with only a minority, estimated less than five per cent, having converted to Islam. The main instigator for the beginning of mass conversions in the region were the draconian measures adopted by the Ottomans after the two failed local revolts, in which both Christians and the Muslim (then) minority participated. In their wake, the Ottoman pashas tripled the taxes owed by the non-Muslim population, as they regarded the Orthodox element as a continuous threat. Another reason for conversion was the absence of liturgical ceremonies. The first wave of conversions began in the 18th century, among a poor farmers. The wars of the eighteenth and early nineteenth centuries between Russia and the Ottoman Empire negatively impacted upon the region. Increased conversions followed, often forced. During the entire 18th century, Muslims were still a minority among the Albanian population of the region, and became the majority only in the second half of the 19th century. Estimates based on the defter of 1875 show that Muslim Chams had surpassed Orthodox Chams in numbers.

In a number of cases however, only one person, usually the oldest male member of the family, converted into Islam, in order not to pay taxes, while all other members remained Christians. As a result, historians argue that the Cham Albanians were either Christian or Crypto-Christian as late as the first half of the 19th century. During the second half though the majority of Chams became fully Islamized and Crypto-Christianity ceased to exist.

== Reports of modern day Laramans ==
=== Stublla and Karadak ===
There continued to be laramans living in the mountainous hinterland (Karadak, also known as Skopska Crna Gora) around Stubell, in Kosovo's Vitina municipality. There are still laramanë in this area today in "remote and almost deserted hamlets", as Duijzings notes. They opted not to openly revert to Catholicism in this area, because of traditional marriage ties to Muslim clans. Most of the laramanë that originally lived in these remote areas ultimately moved onto the plains and became either entirely Catholic or entirely Muslim, more often choosing the dominant religion of the place they moved to.

=== 21st century "conversions" ===
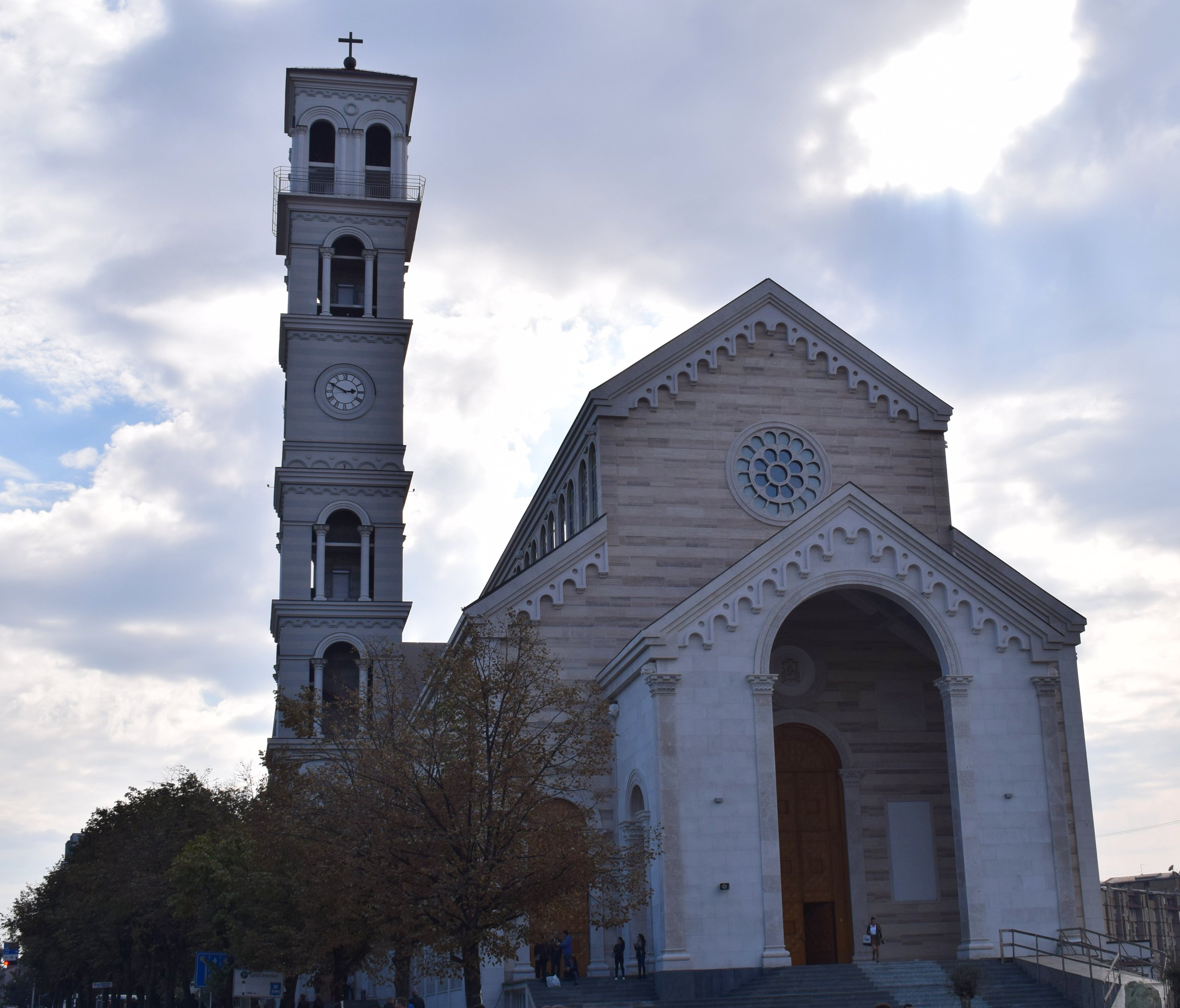
The new Mother Teresa Cathedral in Prishtina

There have been reports of Albanians in Klina and the surrounding regions, as well as Rugova and Drenica and southern Kosovo, converting to Catholicism, and asserting a laraman heritage, in which the Catholic faith was maintained and transmitted by mothers, daughters and sisters, and Ramadan was celebrated alongside Christmas and Easter. The town of Kravoserije saw a new church built in 2005, and is a center where many who have "reverted" live. The Muslim community protested proposals to build a new church in Llapushnik, in the Drenica region, to serve the converts. As of 2008, a new church was being built in Klina as well to serve the "converts" (who do not identify as "converts", asserting to have had a Catholic heritage that was simply hidden). The local Catholic cleric, Don Shan Zefi, says the Catholic church has not been seeking converts, but that instead Kosovar Albanians are contacting him and he asserted in 2008 that there were "tens of villages" looking to convert.

Discourse on the trend has been mixed. Converts frequently cite a laraman heritage, or at least an ancestral link to Catholicism, as do some Albanian academics and clergy on the topic, such as Don Shan Zefi and Father Lush Gjergji. Albertini notes that converts also noted that "Western countries do not like Muslims", while at the same time they were seeking support and protection from the West. Albertini argues that "the 'crypto-Catholic' route is partly an 'invented tradition' -- good for justifying the need of an 'identity baptism' more than a 'cultural baptism'", while also noting the role of the efficiency of the "social-humanitarian Catholic machine". Naim Ternava, the head of the Kosovo Islamic community, has opposed the new churches as well as the new cathedral in Prishtina. The historian Jahja Drancolli attributes the phenomenon to the combination of the desire to return to one's roots, as well as the desire to demonstrate a "Euro-Atlantic" orientation.

== Modern discourse ==
A number of scholarly works when discussing laramans have largely held the narrative upheld by the laramans and the priesthood that there was a "continuity" of crypto-Catholic practice in Kosovo, in which laraman communities simulated Muslim identity while retaining an uncorrupted Catholic identity at home, involving not going to mosque, going to church, inviting priests to their homes, and celebrating important Christian feasts, and baptising their children. Laramanism, in this sense, was a response to Ottoman persecution of Christians and pressure for conversion to Islam. Duijzings, meanwhile, suspects that the Crypto-Christian tradition is in part a "re-invented" identity. He suspects that laramanism had become "obsolete" in Karadag (Letnica) due to the early 19th century lack of priests and churches in the area, and wonders how Catholic the identities of inhabitants of Stublla really were before their "martyrdom". He suggests that for many of them, the declaration of Catholicism had more to do with avoiding military service, and "crypto-Christian" practice became more tenable after the Catholic church re-established a stable presence in the area in the late nineteenth century. Skendi meanwhile notes that "there is a possible confusion between Crypto-Christianity and an imperfect Moslem conversion in which the converts retain at least traces of their previous religion", noting prior remarks by R. M. Dawkins in analogous cases concerning the Vallahades of Greece, in which there was "a mixed religion... there is no evidence that they did not believe equally in both elements."

Malcolm likely notes the separate phenomenon of religious amphibianism, especially noteworthy in Kosovo, where families of mixed religious affiliations practiced both religions. Such situations often arose through conversion of one family member but not others, or through interfaith marriages. Nevertheless, such cases often gave rise to situational crypto-Christianity, where Catholic family members often had both Catholic and Muslim names, and used their intimate knowledge of Islam to pretend to be Muslim when away from home so as to benefit from the higher social position and privileges afforded to Muslims in the Ottoman system. Such practices were especially common in Malësia e Madhe. Malcolm also notes cases where families of crypto-Christians in Kosovo actually became biconfessional, sincerely practicing both faiths.

A number of scholars explain the spread of Bektashi Sufi order among Albanians in part because it allowed itself to be a vehicle for the expression of Crypto-Christian beliefs and rituals. Bektashism is a Muslim pantheistic dervish order (tariqat) thought to have originated in the 13th century in a frontier region of Anatolia, where Christianity, Islam and paganism coexisted, allowing the incorporation of comparable pagan and local non-Muslim beliefs into popular Islam, which facilitated the conversion process to the new Muslims. It was the official order of the Ottoman troops of Janissaries, who seem to have introduced it in Albania, where it became a sect for the local population and spread as nowhere else in the Balkans. The great expansion of Bektashism in southern Albania is considered to have occurred from the beginning of the 19th century under the influence of Ali Pasha Tepelena who ruled a region where Christians and Muslims coexisted.

Ger Duijzings notes the usage of laramans, especially the "martyrs of Stublla" in Albanian nationalism to enforce a sense of defiance and a sense of "defending Albania" under Turkish occupation. In modern times, Kosovar Albanians have shown interest in and referred to Albanian Christian origins and heritage, in particular the laraman heritage, which is recruited to present Albanians as European despite being Muslim.

== Sources ==
=== Bibliography ===
- Bartl, Peter (1967). "Kryptochristentum und Formen des religiösen Synkretismus in Albanien". Grazer und Münchener balkanologische Studien (in German). pp. 117–127.
- Bellé, Aleksandar (1972). Јужнословенски филолог. Vol. 29.
- Bieber, Florian (19 August 2010). "Muslim identity in the Balkans before the establishment of nation states". Nationalities Papers: The Journal of Nationalism and Ethnicity.
- Çarçani, Leonard (2007). Besimet Fetare ne Prefekturën e Elbasanit 1920-1939. Tirana: Tirana University.
- Cordignano, Fulvio (1943). Geografia ecclesiastica dell'Albania dagli ultimi decenni del secolo XVI alla metà del secolo XVII.
- Duijzings, Ger (2000). Religion and the Politics of Identity in Kosovo. C. Hurst & Co. Publishers. pp. 86–. ISBN 978-1-85065-431-5.
- Elsie, Robert (2010). Historical Dictionary of Albania. Historical Dictionaries of Europe. Vol. 75 (2 ed.). Scarecrow Press. ISBN 978-0810861886.
- Elsie, Robert (2019). The Albanian Bektashi: History and Culture of a Dervish Order in the Balkans. Bloomsbury Publishing. ISBN 9781788315715.
- Fleming, K. E. (2014). The Muslim Bonaparte: Diplomacy and Orientalism in Ali Pasha's Greece. Princeton University Press. ISBN 978-1400864973.
- Gawrych, George (2006). The Crescent and the Eagle: Ottoman rule, Islam and the Albanians, 1874–1913. London: IB Tauris. ISBN 9781845112875.
- Giakoumis, Kosta (2010). "The Orthodox Church in Albania Under the Ottoman Rule, 15th- 19th Century". In Oliver Jens Schmitt (ed.). Religion und Kultur im albanischschprachen sudosteuropen. Peter Lang. ISBN 978-3631602959.
- Gjini, Gasper (1986). Skopsko-prizrenska biskupija kroz stoljeća (in Croatian). Zagreb: Krscanska Sadasnjost.
- Isufi, Hajredin (2004). "Aspects of Islamization in Çamëri". Historical Studies (in Albanian). 3 (4). Tirana, Albania: Institute of History.
- Jelavich, Barbara (1983). History of the Balkans. Cambridge: Cambridge University Press.
- Malcolm, Noel (1998). Kosovo: a short history. Macmillan. ISBN 978-0-333-66612-8.
- Malcolm, Noel (2020), Rebels, Believers, Survivors: Studies in the History of the Albanians, Oxford University Press, ISBN 978-0198857297
- Marmullaku, Ramadan (1975). Albania and the Albanians. London: C. Hurst & co. ISBN 0903983133.
- Martucci, Donato (2010). I Kanun delle montagne albanesi: Fonti, fondamenti e mutazioni del diritto tradizionale albanese. Edizioni di Pagina. ISBN 9788874701223.
- Matkovski, Aleksandar (1973). Islamizacijata kako metod na pacifikacija na Debarsiot kraj, Bigorski naučno-kulturni sobiri, 1971. Skopje.
- Minkov, Anton (2004). Conversion to Islam in the Balkans: Kisve Bahas ̧petitions and Ottoman Social Life, 1670-1730. Brill. ISBN 9004135766.
- Pahumi, Nevila (2007), The Consolidation of Albanian Nationalism: The League of Prizren 1878-1881, University of Michigan
- Radonić, Jovan (1950). Rimska Kurija i juznoslovenske zemlje od XVI do XIX veka.
- Skendi, Stavro (1967). "Crypto-Christianity in the Balkan Area under the Ottomans". Slavic Review. 26 (2): 227–246. doi:10.2307/2492452. JSTOR 2492452. S2CID 163987636.
- Skendi, Stavro (1967b). The Albanian national awakening. Princeton: Princeton University Press. ISBN 9781400847761.
- Schmitt, Oliver Jens, ed. (2010). Religion und Kultur im albanischschprachen sudosteuropen. Peter Lang. ISBN 978-3631602959.
- Sopi, Mark (1972). "Fenomen ljaramanstva u skopsko-prizrenskoj biskupiji". Crkva U Svijetu. 7 (3): 271–273.
- Takeyh, Ray; Gvosdev, Nikolas K. (2004). The receding shadow of the prophet: The rise and fall of radical political Islam. Westport: Greenwood Publishing Group. ISBN 9780275976286.
- Zhelyazkova, Antonia (2000). "Albanian identities". In Antonia Zhelyazkova (ed.). Albania and the Albanian identities. Sofia: International Center for Minority Studies and Intercultural Relations.
