= Lindau (disambiguation) =

Lindau is a town and island in Bavaria, Germany.

Lindau may also refer to:

== Places ==
=== Germany ===
- Lindau (Anhalt), a town in the district Anhalt-Zerbst, Saxony-Anhalt
- Lindau (Katlenburg-Lindau), a village in the municipality of Katlenburg-Lindau in Lower Saxony
- Lindau, Schleswig-Holstein, part of Amt Dänischer Wohld, district Rendsburg-Eckernförde, Schleswig-Holstein
- Lindau (district), Swabia
- Lindau (island), the Altstadt of the town of Lindau
- Lindau, a district of Trebgast, Kulmbach

=== Switzerland ===
- Lindau, Switzerland, Zurich, a municipality

== People ==
- Lindau (surname), a list of people

== Other uses ==
- SpVgg Lindau, a football club from Lindau, Bavaria
- Lindau-class minehunter, a class of German coastal minehunters
  - Lindau, lead ship of the class, later given to the Estonian Navy and renamed EML Sulev (M312)

== See also ==
- Lindau Abbey, Lindau, Bavaria
