= Lindauer Brothers Company =

- Type: Private
- Industry: Men's clothing and furnishings retail
- Defunct: 1888
- Fate: Bankruptcy
- Headquarters: Chicago, Illinois, United States
- Area served: Chicago
- Products: Men's furnishing goods

Lindauer Brothers Company was a Chicago dealer in men's goods that went bankrupt in 1888.
