= Molla Kabiz =

Islamic cleric (died 1527)

Molla Kabiz was an Islamic cleric who was executed in Istanbul in 4 November 1527 for teaching the heresy that Jesus was spiritually superior to the prophet Muhammad. Little is known of his early life, other than that he was originally from Iran and had been educated in Islamic scholarship. Having been found guilty of heresy, the court urged him to renounce his doctrines and return to Sunni orthodoxy; he refused, resulting in his execution by beheading on 4 November 1527. The primary historical source for his trial and execution is the works of the Ottoman historian Celâlzâde Mustafa Çelebi, who was Reis ül-Küttab (chief of the Imperial Council bureaucracy) at the time, and hence was personally aware of the case.
