= Protestantism in Eritrea =

The World Religion Database noted that in 2020, 47% of the population of Eritrea were Christian; almost 4% are Protestant (mainly P'ent'ay Evangelicalists).

The Evangelical Lutheran Church of Eritrea is one of the four officially recognized religious institutions in Eritrea.

== History ==
Protestantism has had a presence in Eritrea for over 150 years. The Swedish Evangelical Mission (SEM) first sent missionaries to preach to the Kunama people in 1866. Between the late-19th and late-20th centuries, the SEM undertook the task of translating the Bible into various Eritrean languages.

Jehovah's Witnesses have been a target of government persecution since Eritrea's independence, as they opposed the referendum for independence and have refused to participate in compulsory military service. They have been stripped of their rights and subjected to imprisonment; the United States Department of State reported in 2021 that 24 Jehovah's Witnesses are currently detained.

In 2002, the Eritrean government closed down places of worship of all unrecognized religious groups, including Jehovah's Witnesses and Protestant churches separate from the Evangelical Lutheran Church of Eritrea. The USDoS reported in 2021 that 345 church leaders and between 800 and 1,000 laypeople are currently detained.

== Denominations ==
Amnesty International reports that the following evangelical denominations are present in Eritrea:

- Seventh-day Adventists
- Mullu Wongel (Full Gospel) Church
- Kale Hiwot (Word of Life) Church
- Meseret Kristos Church
- Rema Church
- Hallelujah Church
- Faith Mission
- Faith Church of Christ
- Philadelphia Church
- Presbyterian Evangelical Church
- Trinity Fellowship Church
- Dubre Bethel Church
- Church of the Living God
- New Covenant Church

== Freedom of religion ==
In 2021, the United States Department of State (USDoS) named it a Country of Particular Concern due to its violation of religious liberty, noting that other denominations (particularly Jehovah's Witnesses) face persecution from the Eritrean government. In the same year, the Barnabas Fund reported that Christians (regardless of denomination) in Eritrea had been subjected to torture, including being held in shipping containers.

In 2023, the country was scored 1 out of 4 for religious freedom. This was seen as an improvement, as several religious prisoners had been released in the previous months. In the same year, the country was rated as the 4th worst place in the world to be a Christian.

== See also ==
- Religion in Eritrea
- Christianity in Eritrea
- Eritrean Catholic Church
