= Lindau (surname) =

Lindau is a surname. Notable people with the surname include:

- Arvid Lindau (1892–1958), Swedish pathologist
- Baruch Lindau (1759–1849), German-Jewish writer
- Bill Lindau (1903–1989), American race car driver
- Gustav Lindau (1866–1923), German botanist
- Ingolf Lindau (born 1942), Swedish physicist
- James H. Lindau, American politician, mayor of Bloomington, Minnesota, from 1977 to 1987
- Karl Lindau, pen and stage name of Karl Gemperle (1853–1934), Austrian actor, writer and librettist
- Märta Boman (1902–1986), née Lindau, Swedish politician
- Paul Lindau (1839–1919), German writer, brother of the writer Rudolf Lindau
- Peter Lindau (born 1972), Swedish footballer
- Peeter Lindau (1886–?), Estonian politician
- Rudolf Lindau (diplomat) (1829–1910), German writer
- Rudolf Lindau (politician) (1888–1977), German politician and historian
