= Galinoporni =

Galinoporni: Γαληνόπορνη (Greek); Kaleburnu (Turkish)
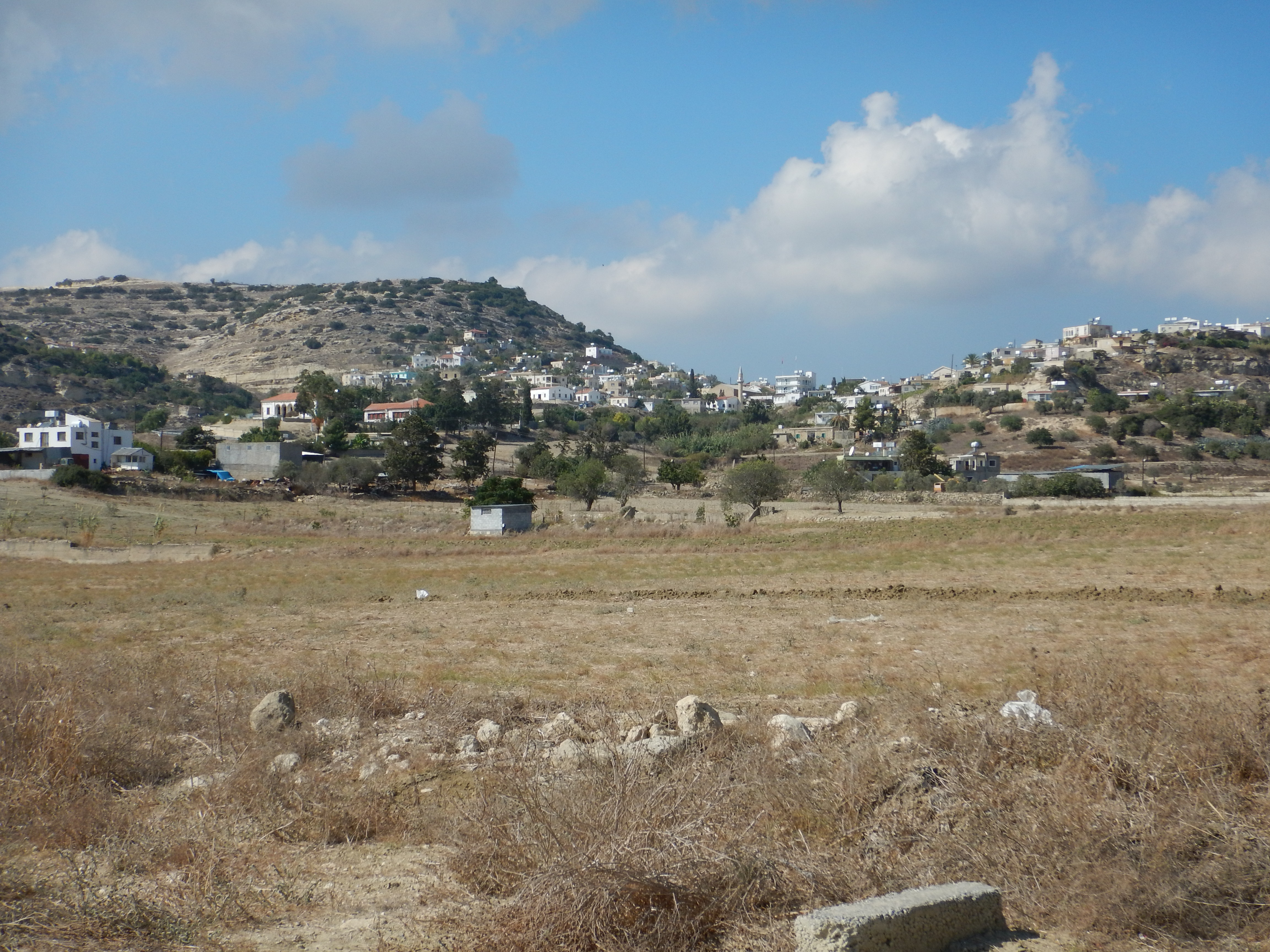
- View of the village of Galinoporni in 2016

- Location within Cyprus
- Coordinates: 35°31′21″N 34°18′07″E
- Country (de jure): Cyprus
  - District: Famagusta District
- Country (de facto): Northern Cyprus
  - District: İskele District

Population (2011)
  - Total: 333

Galinoporni (Greek: Γαληνόπορνη; Turkish: Kaleburnu) is a village in Cyprus, located on the southern side of the Karpas Peninsula. Galinoporni is under the de facto control of Northern Cyprus. As of 2011, it had a population of 333.

The village has always been exclusively populated by Turkish Cypriots. It has a permanent population but is also inhabited in the summer months by villagers who emigrated to the United Kingdom as a result of the Cyprus problem. Cypriot Turkish is the most commonly spoken dialect, though most elderly inhabitants can speak and understand both Turkish and Greek, with some speaking Greek as a first language.

The surroundings of the village host two Bronze Age sites: in Kraltepe the remains of a palace have been excavated, whose dwellers had trade contacts with the eastern coast of the Mediterranean sea around 1200 BC. In Nitovikla there is a fortress dating back to 1500 BC, whose citadel has been erected in the style of the Hittitian fortress of Hattusa in Anatolia. Moreover, in Avtepe there is an important group of caves.
