= Lindauer (surname) =

Lindauer is a German surname. Notable people with the surname include:

- Charles Frederick Lindauer (c. 1836–1921), American businessman and criminal
- Gottfried Lindauer (1839–1926), Czech-New Zealand artist
- Janez Lindauer, 16th-century Slovene politician
- John Howard Lindauer (born 1937), American economist, media businessman and politician, former chancellor of the University of Alaska Anchorage
- Martin Lindauer (1918–2008), German behavioral scientist
- Susan Lindauer (born 1963), American journalist and peace activist, daughter of John Lindauer
- Victor Wilhelm Lindauer (1888–1964), New Zealand phycologist
