= Sephardic Jews =

Jewish diaspora of Spain and Portugal

Sefaradís ספרדיס Sefaradim ספרדים (formal)
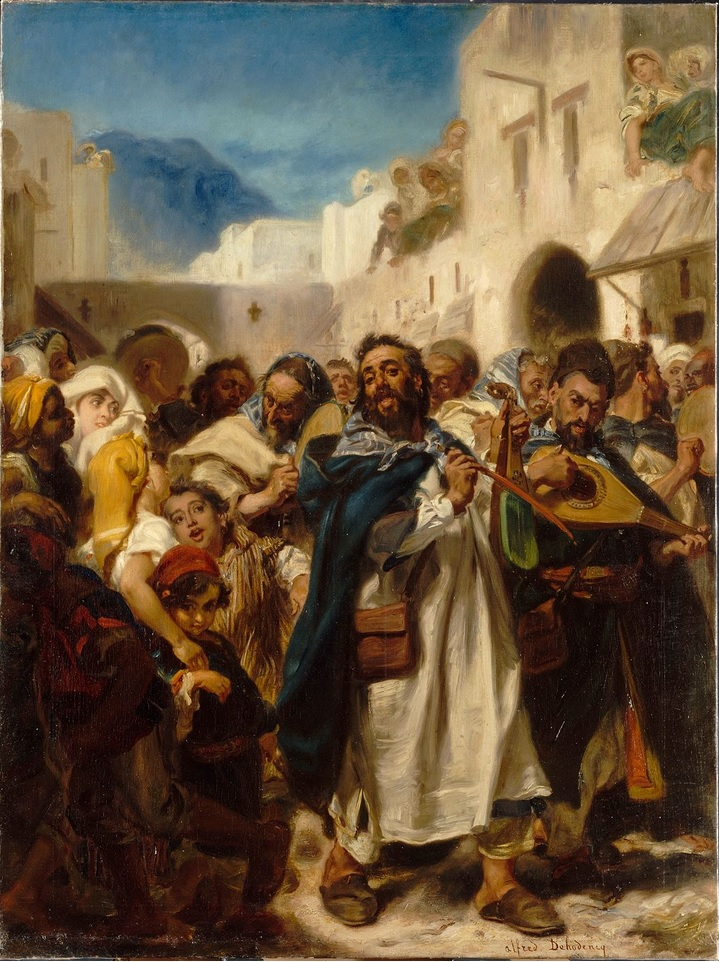
- Sephardic Jewish festival in Tétouan, Morocco, Alfred Dehodencq, 1865, Paris Museum of Jewish Art and History

Languages
- Traditional: Judaeo-Spanish, Judaeo-Catalan, Judaeo-Portuguese, Hebrew (Sephardi, Mishnaic, Medieval; liturgical), Andalusian Arabic, Haketia, Arabic, Judaeo-Occitan, Judeo-Berber, Judeo-Arabic, Judaeo-Papiamento (in Curaçao); Modern: Modern Hebrew, Sephardi Hebrew (liturgical), Catalan, Spanish, Portuguese, French, Dutch, Italian, Macedonian, Bulgarian, Greek, Turkish, Persian, other local languages, Arabic

Religion
- Judaism

Related ethnic groups
- Mizrahi Jews, Maghrebi Jews, Ashkenazi Jews, Hispanic Jews, other Jewish ethnic divisions, Spaniards, Castilians, Andalusians, and Samaritans

Sephardic Jews, (Note: Hebrew: יְהוּדֵי סְפָרַד, romanized: Yehudei Sfarad, lit. 'Jews of Iberia'; Ladino: djudios sefaradis) also known as Sephardi Jews or Sephardim, (Note: Plural: Hebrew: סְפָרַדִּים, Modern Hebrew: Sfaradim, Tiberian Hebrew: Səp̄āraddîm, also Hebrew: יְהדוּת סְפָרַד, romanized: Yehadut Spharad, lit. 'Iberian Jewry'; Spanish: judíos sefardíes (or sefarditas); Portuguese: judeus sefarditas) and rarely as Iberian Peninsula Jews, are a Jewish diaspora population associated with the historic Jewish communities of the Iberian Peninsula and their descendants.

The term "Sephardic" comes from Sepharad, the Hebrew word for Iberia. These communities flourished for centuries in Iberia until they were expelled in the late 15th century. Over time, Sephardic has also come to refer more broadly to the diverse Jewish peoples, particularly in the Middle East and North Africa, who adopted Sephardic religious customs and legal traditions (often due to the influences of exiles). Sephardic Jews form a major component of the global Jewish population, with a high percentage of the Sephardic-Jewish population now living in Israel.

The earliest documented Jewish presence in the Iberian Peninsula dates to the Roman period, beginning in the first centuries CE. After facing persecution under the pagan and later Christian Visigothic Kingdom, Jewish communities flourished for centuries under Muslim rule in Al-Andalus following the Umayyad conquest (711–720s), a period often seen as a golden age. Their status declined under the Almoravid and Almohad dynasties and during the Christian Reconquista. In 1391, anti-Jewish riots in Castile and Aragon led to massacres and mass forced conversions. In 1492, the Alhambra Decree by the Catholic Monarchs expelled Jews from Spain, and in 1496, King Manuel I of Portugal issued a similar edict. These events led to migrations, forced conversions, and executions.

Sephardic Jews widely dispersed throughout the Mediterranean basin. Many found refuge throughout the Ottoman Empire, settling in such cities as Istanbul, Salonica, and İzmir; even more Sephardic Jews found refuge in the Mediterranean Maghreb — settling in Tétouan, Fez, Algiers, and Tunis, forming a major Sephardic population: the Maghrebi Jews.

Some Sephardim also settled in Italian ports including Venice and Livorno, as well as in parts of the Balkans, and the Levant (notably Safed). Small communities settled in the Netherlands (notably Amsterdam) and the coast of Germany (especially Hamburg). Smaller communities also emerged in France, England, and the Americas, where Sephardim often played key roles in commerce and diplomacy.

Historically, the vernacular languages of the Sephardic Jews and their descendants have been variants of either Spanish, Catalan or Portuguese, although they have also adopted and adapted other languages. These variants are academically called Judaeo-Spanish (or ladino), Judaeo-Catalan (or katalaní) and Judaeo-Portuguese (aljamiado português). The variant called ladino is a Romance language derived from Old Spanish and Old Portuguese that was spoken by the eastern Sephardic Jews who settled in the Eastern Mediterranean after their expulsion from Spain in 1492. In the former provinces of the Ottoman Empire, Ladino is also referred to as djudezmo. The gestation and development of Ladino can be compared to that of Yiddish in Germany, among Ashkenazi Jews of central and eastern European origin. However, Ladino must not be confused with the Ladin language that is spoken in the Austrian and Italian Alps. The Sephardic linguistic repertoire is dovetailed with Haketia (also known as "Tetuani Ladino"), an Arabic-influenced variety of Judaeo-Spanish, which was spoken by North African Sephardic Jews who settled in the region after the 1492 Spanish expulsion.

== Spanish and Portuguese nationalities ==
In 2015, more than five centuries after the expulsion, both Spain and Portugal enacted laws allowing Sephardic Jews who could prove their ancestral origins in those countries to apply for citizenship. By allowing dual nationalities, the purpose of such statutes was to offer a collective form of historical reparation for the harm inflicted on the Jewish forebears of the distant past, to their descendants of the present day. The preamble to the Spanish legislation expressly recognized the Sephardic fidelity and indelible sense of belonging to Sepharad, while commending their preservation of language, memories and cultural traditions across the many generations that lived in exile.

The Spanish law that offered citizenship to descendants of Sephardic Jews expired in 2019, although subsequent extensions were granted by the Spanish government —due to the COVID-19 pandemic— in order to file pending documents and sign delayed declarations before a notary in Spain. The last opportunity to complete existing Sephardic applications for Spanish nationality was on September 1, 2021. After that date, new Sephardic applicants may still try to petition the Spanish government directly for carta de naturaleza —in the hope of obtaining a discretionary decision by the Council of Ministers— or resort to the alternative 2-year legal residency pathway to citizenship.

In the case of Portugal, the nationality law was modified in 2022 and again in 2024 with very stringent requirements for new Sephardic applicants, effectively ending the possibility of successful applications without evidence of a personal travel history to Portugal —which is tantamount to prior permanent residency— or ownership of inherited property or concerns on Portuguese soil. In May 2026, the Assembly of the Republic (Portuguese Parliament) further amended the nationality law by enforcing the 3-year legal permanent residency requirement on previous Sephardic applicants, ultimately closing the distinct Sephardic pathway to Portuguese citizenship altogether.

== Etymology ==
The name Sephardi means "Iberian" or "Hispanic," derived from Sepharad (Hebrew: סְפָרַד, Modern: Sfarád, Tiberian: Səp̄āráḏ), a Biblical location. The location of the Biblical Sepharad points to the Iberian peninsula, then the westernmost outpost of Phoenician maritime trade. Jewish presence in Iberia is believed to have started during the reign of King Solomon, whose excise imposed taxes on Iberian exiles. Although the first date of arrival of Jews in Iberia is the subject of ongoing archaeological research, there is evidence of established Jewish communities as early as the 1st century CE.

Modern transliteration of Hebrew romanizes the consonant פ (pe without a dagesh dot placed in its center) as the digraph ph, in order to represent fe or the single phoneme /f/, the English sound that is voiceless labiodental fricative. In other languages and scripts, "Sephardi" may be translated as plural Hebrew: סְפָרַדִּים, Modern: Sfaraddim, Tiberian: Səp̄āraddîm; Spanish: sefardíes; Portuguese: sefarditas; Catalan: sefardites; Aragonese: safardís; Basque: Sefardiak; French: Séfarades; Galician: sefardís; Italian: sefarditi; Greek: Σεφαρδίτες, romanized: Sephardites; Serbo-Croatian: Сефарди, Sefardi; Ladino: sefaradies, sefaradim; and Arabic: سفارديون, romanized: Safārdiyyūn.

== Definition ==
=== Narrow ethnic definition ===
In the narrower ethnic definition, a Sephardic Jew is one descended from the Jews who lived in the Iberian Peninsula in the late 15th century, immediately prior to the issuance of the Alhambra Decree of 1492 by order of the Catholic Monarchs in Spain, and the decree of 1496 in Portugal by order of King Manuel I.

In Hebrew, the term "Sephardim Tehorim" (ספרדים טהורים, literally "Pure Sephardim"), derived from a misunderstanding of the initials ס"ט "Samekh Tet" traditionally used with some proper names (which stand for sofo tov, "may his end be good" or "sin v'tin", "mire and mud" has in recent times been used in some quarters to distinguish Sephardim proper, "who trace their lineage back to the Iberian/Spanish population", from Sephardim in the broader religious sense. This distinction has also been made in reference to 21st-century genetic findings in research on 'Pure Sephardim', in contrast to other communities of Jews today who are part of the broad classification of Sephardi.

Ethnic Sephardic Jews have had a presence in North Africa and various parts of the Mediterranean and Western Asia due to their expulsion from Spain. There have also been Sephardic communities in South America and India.

==== Katalanim ====
Originally, Jews spoke of Sefarad referring to Al-Andalus and not the entire peninsula, nor as it is understood today, in which the term Sefarad is used in modern Hebrew to refer to Iberia. This has caused a long misunderstanding, since traditionally the entire Iberian Diaspora has been included in a single group. But the historiographical research reveals that that word, seen as homogeneous, was actually divided into distinct groups: the Sephardim, coming from the countries of the Castilian crown, Castilian language speakers, and the Katalanim / Katalaní, originally from the Crown of Aragon, Judeo-Catalan speakers.

=== Broad religious definition ===
The modern Israeli Hebrew definition of Sephardi is a much broader, religious based, definition that generally excludes ethnic considerations. In its most basic form, this broad religious definition of a Sephardi refers to any Jew, of any ethnic background, who follows the customs and traditions of Sepharad. For religious purposes, and in modern Israel, "Sephardim" is most often used in this wider sense. It encompasses most non-Ashkenazi Jews who are not ethnically Sephardi, but are in most instances of West Asian or North African origin. They are classified as Sephardi because they commonly use a Sephardic style of liturgy; this constitutes a majority of Mizrahi Jews in the 21st century.

The term Sephardi in the broad sense, describes the nusach (Hebrew language, "liturgical tradition") used by Sephardic Jews in their Siddur (prayer book). A nusach is defined by a liturgical tradition's choice of prayers, order of prayers, text of prayers and melodies used in the singing of prayers. Sephardim traditionally pray using Minhag Sefarad.

The term Nusach Sefard or Nusach Sfarad does not refer to the liturgy generally recited by Sephardim proper or even Sephardi in a broader sense, but rather to an alternative Eastern European liturgy used by many Hasidim, who are Ashkenazi.

Additionally, Ethiopian Jews, whose branch of practiced Judaism is known as Haymanot, have been included under the oversight of Israel's already broad Sephardic Chief Rabbinate.

== History in Spain and Portugal ==
=== Arrival and early history ===
The earliest significant Jewish presence in the Iberian Peninsula is typically traced back to the Roman period, during the first centuries CE. Evidence includes an amphora discovered in Ibiza, stamped with two Hebrew letters in relief, indicating possible trade between Judaea and the Balearics in the first century. Additionally, the Epistle to the Romans records Paul's intent to visit Spain, hinting at a Jewish community in the region during the mid-first century CE. Josephus writes that Herod Antipas was deposed and exiled to Spain, possibly to Lugdunum Convenarum, in 39 CE.

Archaeological evidence of a Jewish presence in Spain prior to the third century CE is limited. However, from the third to sixth centuries, inscriptions confirm the existence of Jewish communities, particularly in the more Romanized regions of the south and east, such as Toledo, Mérida, Seville, and Tarragona. Additionally, these inscriptions suggest a Jewish presence in other locations, including Elche, Tortosa, Adra, and the Balearic Islands. Rabbinic literature from the Amoraic era references Spain as a distant land with a Jewish presence. For example, a tradition passed down by Rabbi Berekiah and Rabbi Shimon bar Yochai, quoting second-century tanna Rabbi Meir, states: "Do not fear, O Israel, for I help you from remote lands, and your seed from the land of their captivity, from Gaul, from Spain, and from their neighbors."

Medieval legends often traced the arrival of Jews in Spain to the First Temple period, with some associating the biblical Tarshish with Tartessus and suggesting Jewish traders were active in Spain during the Phoenician and Carthaginian eras. One such legend from the 16th century claimed that a funeral inscription in Murviedro belonged to Adoniram, a commander of King Solomon, who had supposedly died in Spain while collecting tribute. Another legend spoke of a letter allegedly sent by the Jews of Toledo to Judaea in 30 CE, asking to prevent the crucifixion of Jesus. These legends aimed to establish that Jews had settled in Spain well before the Roman period and to absolve them of any responsibility for the death of Jesus, a charge often leveled at them in later centuries.

Rabbi and scholar Abraham ibn Daud wrote in 1161: "A tradition exists with the [Jewish] community of Granada that they are from the inhabitants of Jerusalem, of the descendants of Judah and Benjamin, rather than from the villages, the towns in the outlying districts [of Israel]." Elsewhere, he writes about his maternal grandfather's family and how they came to Spain after Jerusalem's destruction in 70 CE: "When Titus prevailed over Jerusalem, his officer who was appointed over Hispania appeased him, requesting that he send to him captives made-up of the nobles of Jerusalem, and so he sent a few of them to him, and there were amongst them those who made curtains and who were knowledgeable in the work of silk, and [one] whose name was Baruch, and they remained in Mérida."

=== Under Late Roman and Visigothic rule (4th–7th century) ===
Around 300 CE, the Synod of Elvira, an ecclesiastical council convened in southern Spain, and enacted several decrees to restrict interactions between Christians and Jews. Among the measures were prohibitions on intermarriage between Jews and Christians, communal dining, and the participation of Jews in blessing fields. Despite these efforts, aimed to diminish Jewish influence on Christian communities, evidence indicates that everyday social relations between Jews and Christians continued to be prevalent in various locales.

By the mid-5th century, Spain came under the control of the Visigothic Kingdom, following a period of significant instability caused by Barbarian invasions that led to the collapse of the Western Roman Empire. Initially, the Christian Visigoths practiced Arianism and, while they generally did not engage in the persecution of Jews, they did not extend particular favor to them either. It was not until the reign of Alaric II (484–507) that a Visigothic king concerned himself with the Jews, as evidenced by the publication of the Breviary of Alaric in 506, which incorporated Roman legal precedents into Visigothic law.

The situation for Jews in Spain shifted dramatically after the conversion of the Visigothic monarchs to Catholicism under King Reccared in 587. As the Visigoths sought to unify the realm under their new religion, their policies towards Jews evolved from initial marginalization to increasingly aggressive measures aimed at their complete eradication from the kingdom. Under successive Visigothic kings and under ecclesiastical authority, many orders of expulsion, forced conversion, isolation, enslavement, execution, and other punitive measures were made. By 612–621, the situation for Jews became intolerable and many left Spain for nearby northern Africa. In 711, thousands of Jews from North Africa accompanied the Muslims who invaded Spain, subsuming Catholic Spain and turning much of it into an Arab state, Al-Andalus.

=== Jewish Life in al-Andalus (711–1085) ===
In 711, Muslim forces crossed the Strait of Gibraltar from North Africa and launched a successful military campaign in the Iberian Peninsula. This conquest resulted in the establishment of Muslim rule over much of the region, which they referred to as "Al-Andalus". The territory would remain under varying degrees of Muslim control for several centuries. The Jewish community, having faced persecution under Visigothic rule, largely welcomed the new Muslim rulers who offered greater religious tolerance. Under Islamic rule, Jews, like Christians, were designated as dhimmis—protected but second-class monotheists—permitted to practice their religion with relative autonomy in exchange for paying a special tax.

Within half a century of the Islamic conquest, the Umayyad dynasty—overthrown by the Abbasids in 750—established an independent emirate in al-Andalus, with Córdoba as its capital. In 929, the Umayyad emir 'Abd al-Raḥmān III declared himself caliph, asserting full political and religious independence from eastern Islamic authority and initiating a new era of prosperity that increasingly attracted Jewish migrants from the less stable east. During this period of rising stability and cultural exchange, Ḥasdai ibn Shaprūṭ, a Jewish physician, scholar, and court official, emerged as a trusted advisor to the caliph. He played a key role in the Jewish cultural renaissance of the period, fostering the work of Hebrew poets and scholars such as Menaḥem ben Saruq and Dunash ben Labraṭ. He benefitted world Jewry not only indirectly by creating a favorable environment for scholarly pursuits within Iberia, but also by using his influence to intervene on behalf of foreign Jews: in his letter to Byzantine Princess Helena, he requested protection for the Jews under Byzantine rule, attesting to the fair treatment of the Christians of al-Andalus, and perhaps indicating that such was contingent on the treatment of Jews abroad. During this period, the Jews served as merchants, artisans and craftsmen, and were hired by the government for those services.

By the 9th century, some members of the Sephardic community felt confident enough to take part in proselytizing amongst Christians. This included the heated correspondences sent between Bodo Eleazar, a former Christian deacon who had converted to Judaism in 838, and the Bishop of Córdoba Paulus Albarus, who had converted from Judaism to Christianity. Each man, using such epithets as "wretched compiler", tried to convince the other to return to his former faith, to no avail.

In 1031, the Umayyad Caliphate of Córdoba disintegrated into smaller Muslim principalities known as taifas. Some were ruled by Berber military leaders, and Jewish courtiers often held influential roles. Jewish intellectual life flourished in Spain's major urban centers. Commentaries on the Bible and Talmud were developed, and a vibrant poetic tradition emerged. One of its most prominent figures was Samuel ha-Nagid (Samuel ibn Naghrillah), who served as vizier and military commander of the Muslim principality of Granada between 993 and 1056. A prolific poet and halakhic scholar, Samuel emphasized his Jewish identity and role as a representative of the Jewish community in official correspondence.

The cultural Golden Age of Jewish life in Muslim Spain produced major Hebrew poets whose works spanned from secular themes—such as love, friendship, and nature—to sacred hymns and religious reflection. Among the most prominent were Solomon ibn Gabirol, Moses ibn Ezra, and Judah ha-Levi (c. 1075–1141). Born in Tudela, ha-Levi became renowned for both his secular and liturgical poetry, particularly his celebrated "Zion poems" that express deep yearning for the Land of Israel. He also authored The Kuzari, a philosophical dialogue defending Judaism and critiquing rationalist philosophy and other faiths; in it, he ultimately affirms the centrality of the Land of Israel and reflects that remaining in the diaspora is a form of hypocrisy. One notable contribution to Christian intellectualism from this period is Ibn Gabirol's neo-Platonic Fons Vitae ("The Source of Life;" "Mekor Hayyim"). Thought by many to have been written by a Christian, this work was admired by Christians and studied in monasteries throughout the Middle Ages, though the work of Solomon Munk in the 19th century proved that the author of Fons Vitae was the Jewish ibn Gabirol.

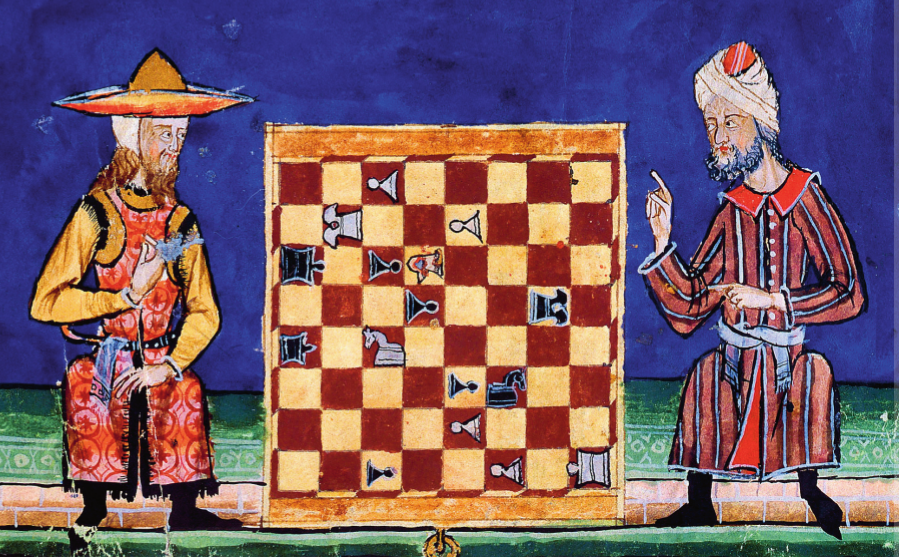
13th-century depiction of a Jew and Muslim playing chess in Al-Andalus

Arabic culture, of course, also made a lasting impact on Sephardic cultural development. General re-evaluation of scripture was prompted by Muslim anti-Jewish polemics and the spread of rationalism, as well as the anti-Rabbanite polemics of Karaites. The cultural and intellectual achievements of the Arabs, and much of the scientific and philosophical speculation of Ancient Greek culture, which had been best preserved by Arab scholars, was made available to the educated Jew. The meticulous regard the Arabs had for grammar and style also had the effect of stimulating an interest in philological matters in general among Jews. Arabic became the main language of Sephardic science, philosophy, and everyday business, as had been the case with Babylonian geonim. This thorough adoption of the Arabic language also greatly facilitated the assimilation of Jews into Moorish culture, and Jewish activity in a variety of professions, including medicine, commerce, finance, and agriculture increased.

The first major and most violent persecution in Islamic Spain was the 1066 Granada massacre, which occurred on 30 December, when a Muslim mob stormed the royal palace in Granada, crucified Jewish vizier Joseph ibn Naghrela and massacred most of the Jewish population of the city after rumors spread that the powerful vizier was plotting to kill the weak-minded and drunk King Badis ibn Habus. An estimated 4,000 Jews were reportedly killed during the Granada riots, though some historians question this figure, viewing it as a possible exaggeration typical of historical number reporting.

=== Under Christian and Berber rule (1085–1215) ===
In the late 11th century, Christian kingdoms in northern Iberia intensified their campaign to reconquer Muslim-held territories, known as the "Reconquista". The conquest of Toledo by King Alfonso VI of Castile in 1085 marked a turning point. Facing mounting external pressure, Muslim rulers invited the Almoravids—a fundamentalist Berber group—to defend their lands. The Almoravids established an empire spanning parts of Iberia and West Africa and expelled Jews from administrative positions in Granada and Seville.

Despite relatively better conditions, Jews in Christian Spain also faced restrictions. In 1081, Pope Gregory VII forbade the Castilian king from appointing Jews to positions of power. In 1108, the Jewish advisor Solomon ibn Farusal was murdered, and by 1118, Alfonso VII banned both Jews and recent Jewish converts to Christianity from holding authority in Toledo. Nevertheless, Jewish scholarship persisted. The historian Abraham ibn Daud, active in Toledo during this time, authored the Sefer ha-Qabbalah and translated key works across disciplines.

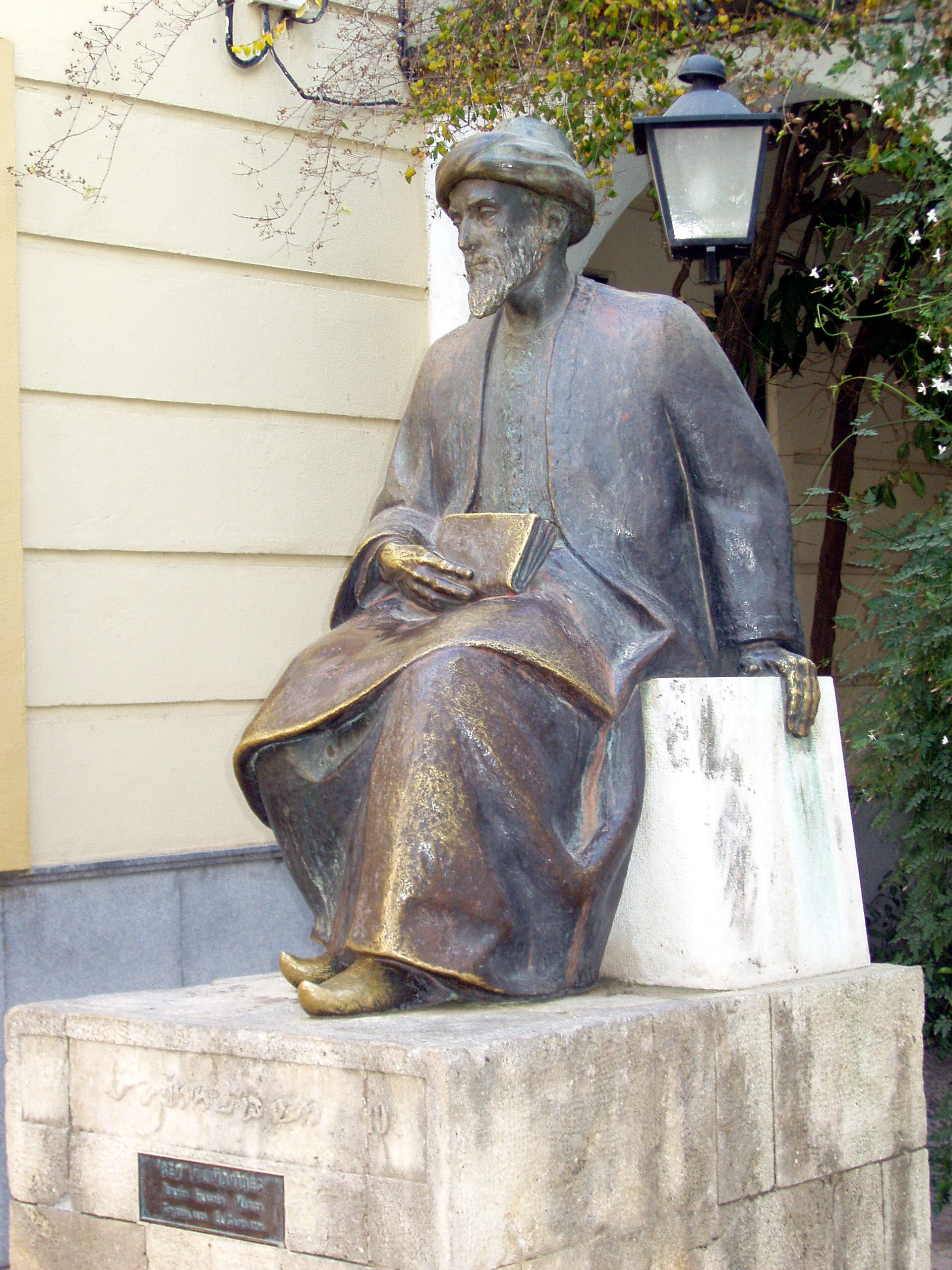
Statue of Maimonides in Córdoba

In 1147–1148, much of Islamic Spain fell to the Almohads, another Berber dynasty, even more intolerant than the Almoravids. They abolished the protected status for Jews and Christians, imposing forced conversions. As a result, many Jews fled to other parts of the Muslim world or sought refuge in Christian Iberia and southern France. Among them were members of the Ibn Tibbon family, who became renowned translators of Jewish and philosophical texts. One of the most significant Jewish figures of this era was Moses ben Maimon, known as Maimonides (or the Rambam). Born in Córdoba, he was forced to flee persecution multiple times—first to Fez, Morocco, later to the Land of Israel, and finally to Egypt, where he settled in Fustat. A towering figure in Jewish thought, Maimonides was a physician, legal codifier, philosopher, and religious leader. His Mishneh Torah systematized Jewish law, earning widespread authority, while his Guide for the Perplexed sought to reconcile Jewish theology with Aristotelian philosophy. His writings influenced both Jewish and broader intellectual traditions across the medieval world.

Meanwhile, Jewish cultural life continued in Christian Spain. Authors such as Yehuda Alharizi, Meshullam da Piera, and Todros Abulafia contributed to a growing body of Hebrew prose and poetry. In Portugal, the Sephardim were given important roles in the sociopolitical sphere and enjoyed a certain amount of protection from the Crown (e.g. Yahia Ben Yahia, first "Rabino Maior" of Portugal and supervisor of the public revenue of the first King of Portugal, D. Afonso Henriques). Even with the increasing pressure from the Catholic Church, this state of affairs remained more or less constant and the number of Jews in Portugal grew with those fleeing from Spain.

=== Rising pressures (1215–1391) ===
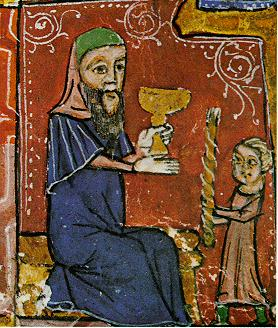
Observing the Havdalah ritual, 14th-century Spain

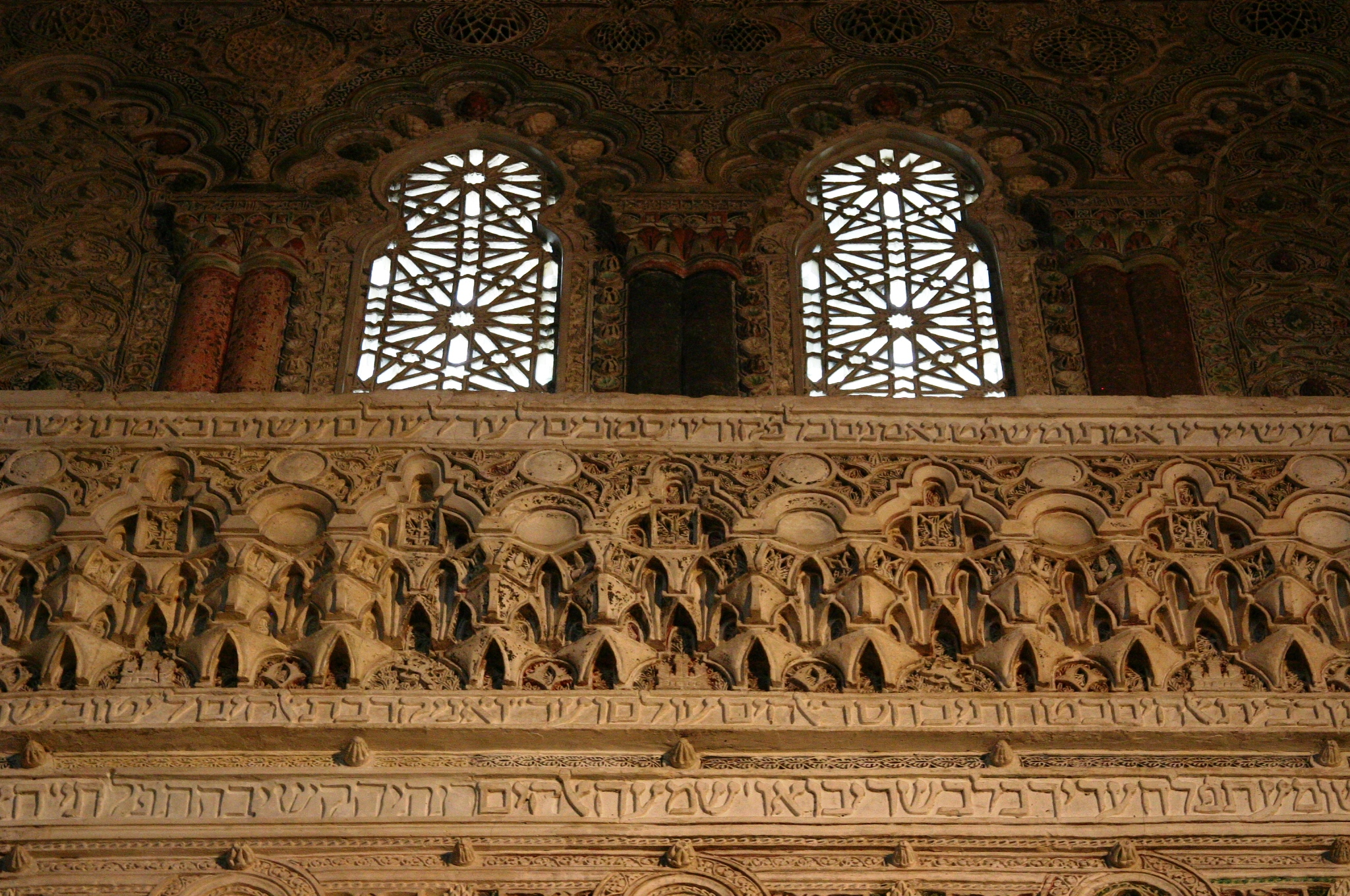
Windows and decorative reliefs of the Synagogue of El Tránsito, Toledo, constructed circa 1350.

By the 13th century, Jewish life in Spain had largely shifted to Christian territories, following a decline under Almoravid rule and the harsh repression of the Almohads, with only small communities remaining under Muslim control. Alfonso X of Castile, nicknamed The Wise, ruled from 1252 to 1284 and was noted for his patronage of literature, science, and translation. Alfonso surrounded himself with scholars of diverse backgrounds, including Jews, and promoted the School of Translators of Toledo. This institution became a major intellectual hub, facilitating the translation of works from Arabic and Hebrew, thus contributing to the transmission of classical and scientific knowledge in medieval Europe. Under Alfonso's reign, the Siete Partidas, a comprehensive legal code, was compiled and promulgated, imposing significant restrictions on Jews. These included regulations inspired by the Fourth Council of the Lateran (1215), such as the mandatory wearing of distinguishing clothing, prohibitions on the construction of new houses of worship, residential segregation, bans on interfaith marriages and nursing arrangements, and other forms of social and legal marginalization. Additionally, Alfonso's Cantigas de Santa Maria, a celebrated collection of devotional songs, contains several compositions that reflect negative views toward Jews.

A pivotal moment in Jewish–Christian relations during this period was the Barcelona Disputation of 1263, a formal debate convened by royal order between Jewish and Christian scholars. Representing the Jewish side was Nachmanides, a prominent philosopher, kabbalist, and commentator from Girona. The debate, while framed as a theological exchange, was part of broader Church efforts to challenge Jewish beliefs and promote conversion.

Around 1280, Moses de León, a Jewish mystic and writer in Castile, composed or disseminated the Zohar, a foundational work of Kabbalah. Written in Aramaic and attributed pseudepigraphically to the 2nd-century sage Rabbi Shimon bar Yochai, the Zohar became one of the most influential texts in Jewish mystical tradition.

The 14th century witnessed increasing hostility toward Jews, partly fueled by the activities of Dominican preachers, who traveled across the Iberian Peninsula delivering sermons against Judaism and inciting anti-Jewish sentiment among Christian populations. One of the most prominent figures was Vicent Ferrer, a Dominican friar active in the latter half of the century. His preaching played a significant role in the social atmosphere that culminated in the pogroms of 1391, a wave of violent anti-Jewish riots that devastated Jewish communities across Spain.

=== Waves of violence, forced conversions, and expulsion (1391–1492/1497) ===
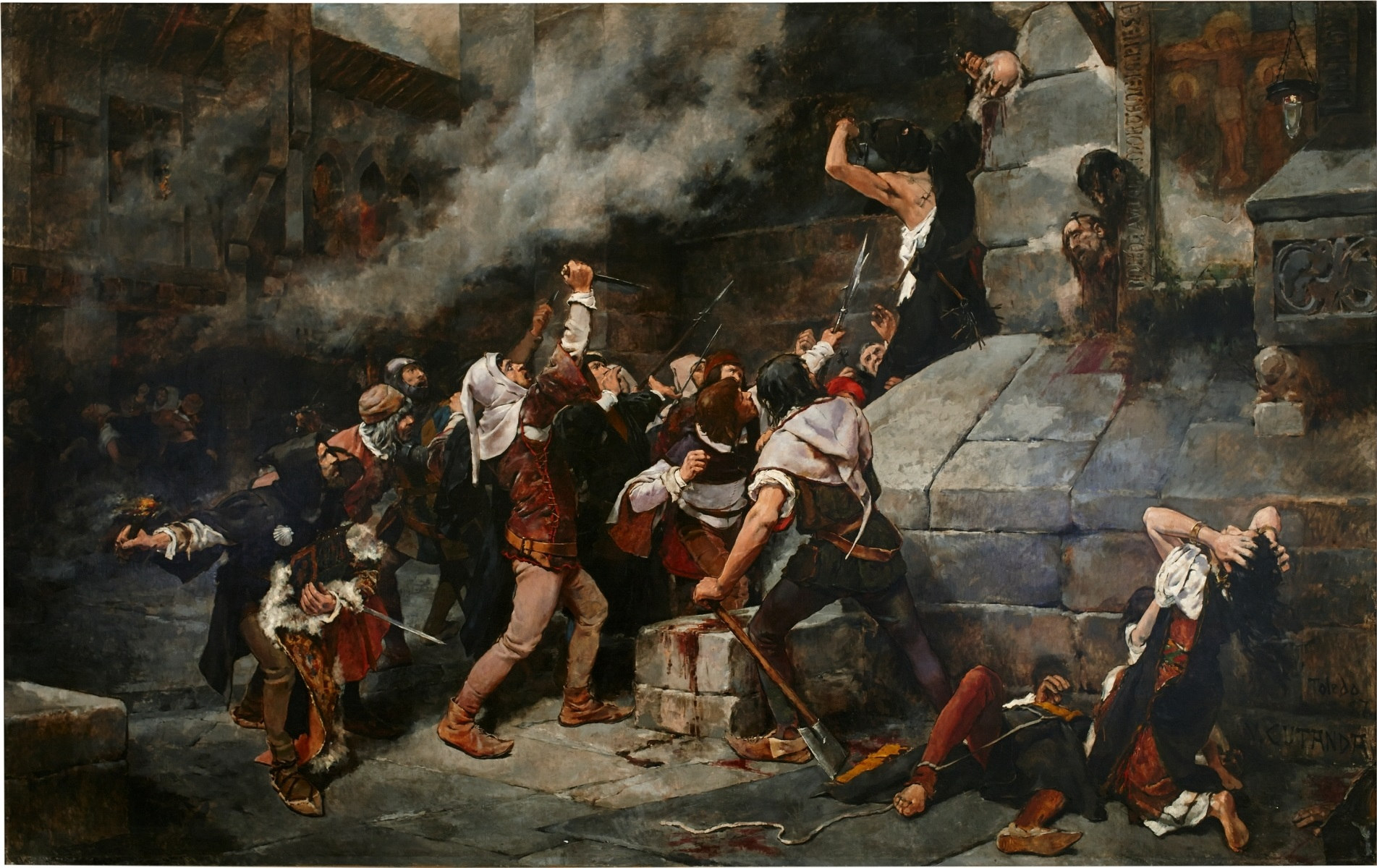
"At the Feet of the Saviour" (1887), a painting by Vicente Cutanda depicting the massacre of Jews in Toledo

In the summer of 1391, a wave of violent anti-Jewish riots swept across the Iberian Peninsula and the Balearic Islands. The unrest began in Seville and rapidly spread to other parts of Castile and Aragon, affecting towns such as Córdoba, Toledo, Cuenca, Burgos, Palma de Mallorca, Barcelona, and Girona. Only the Jews of Portugal and Navarre were spared. During the riots, Jewish quarters were attacked and looted, synagogues were destroyed, thousands of Jews were murdered, and thousands more were forcibly baptized into Christianity. While many Jews fled or resisted, others accepted conversion under extreme duress; some chose martyrdom, and a few prominent figures converted voluntarily. One of those was Solomon ha-Levi, a leading rabbi from Burgos who converted and later became known as Pablo de Santa María, a bishop and vocal opponent of Judaism. The Jewish communities of Valencia and Barcelona were wiped out entirely, while others were severely diminished, prompting many survivors to relocate to rural regions.

The 15th century saw the intensification in the persecution of Jews across the Iberian Peninsula. Beginning in 1411, the Dominican friar Vincent Ferrer led preaching campaigns, prompting both forced conversions and harsh segregation measures. In the 1410s, a new wave of violence and restrictive legislation targeted Jewish communities. The same decade saw the Disputation of Tortosa (1413–1414), a prolonged public spectacle initiated by Pope Benedict XIII and led by the convert Gerónimo de Santa Fe. Though framed as a religious debate, it forced Jewish scholars to defend their faith under duress. The event, lasting nearly two years, led to widespread despair, numerous conversions, and harsh new laws. During this period, the first Limpieza de sangre (Purity of Blood) laws emerged, barring conversos from certain positions based on ancestry. The earliest known case arose in Toledo in 1449, amid a tax revolt that also targeted conversos. Though Pope Nicholas V condemned these laws, certain religious orders, such as the Hieronymites, later received papal permission to enforce them as criteria for entry into monastic life.

In 1478, the Catholic Monarchs, Ferdinand II of Aragon and Isabella I of Castile, received papal authorization to establish the Spanish Inquisition as a permanent tribunal under royal control. Its purpose was to identify and punish conversos suspected of secretly practicing Judaism. The first tribunal was established in Seville in 1480, and additional ones were gradually established throughout Spain. At the Inquisition's helm stood Tomás de Torquemada, a Dominican friar who led a powerful faction at court advocating for the expulsion of the Jews. In January 1483, likely with royal approval, the Inquisition ordered the expulsion of Jews from Andalusia. In the following years, several murder accusations were leveled against Jews. In 1485, the inquisitor Pedro de Arbués was assassinated at the cathedral of Zaragoza in a plot attributed primarily to conversos; although contemporary sources noted the involvement of some old Christians, only conversos were prosecuted, with many tortured, executed, or having their property confiscated, suggesting that the trials were also used to remove influential converso officials. In 1491, the infamous 'Holy Child of La Guardia' blood libel involved the false accusation of Jews and conversos for the ritual murder of a Christian child; confessions were extracted under torture, and all defendants were burned at the stake, despite no evidence that a child had disappeared.

With the fall of the Emirate of Granada, the last Muslim stronghold in Iberia, in January 1492, Ferdinand and Isabella quickly moved to expel the Jewish population from their kingdoms. On March 31, 1492, they issued the Alhambra Decree, mandating that all Jews in Castile and Aragon either convert to Christianity or leave the country within four months. Although Jews were technically allowed to sell their property and take portable goods (excluding gold, silver, and currency), the short timeframe, restrictions, and widespread exploitation made fair transactions nearly impossible. Several thousand chose baptism and remained, and some of them continued to practice Judaism in secret. Others chose exile, but the exact number is unknown. Estimates range from a few tens of thousands to approximately 200,000 expelled. Abraham Senior, the elderly court rabbi of Castile, converted to Christianity under royal sponsorship. In contrast, Don Isaac Abravanel, a leading financier, biblical commentator, and statesman, joined his fellow Jews in leaving Spain. Many Jews fled to the nearby kingdoms of Portugal and Navarre, where they were temporarily welcomed, while others sailed to more distant lands across the Mediterranean and beyond.

In 1497, just five years after the expulsion from Spain, King Manuel I of Portugal issued a decree mandating the forced conversion of all Jews in his realm. Although initially welcoming Jewish refugees from Spain, Manuel reversed course under pressure from the Catholic Monarchs, whose daughter Isabella of Aragon he sought to marry. Rather than permitting Jews to leave the country, as many had planned, Manuel banned emigration and orchestrated mass baptisms. Jewish families were told to bring their children to public squares under the pretense of official registration or medical inspection, only for the children to be taken and baptized without parental consent. In other cases, entire communities were herded into churches and forcibly converted en masse. These coerced converts, known as New Christians (Cristãos-Novos), were legally forbidden from practicing Judaism, yet many continued to observe Jewish customs in secret.

== Expulsion and dispersion ==
=== In the Ottoman Empire ===
Following the eradication of Jewish life in Spain and Portugal in the late 15th century, many Jews found refuge in the lands of the Ottoman Empire, where they established vibrant communities. Over the course of a few generations, these communities emerged as the heart of the Sephardic world. Census data confirm a dramatic demographic shift: Istanbul's Jewish population quintupled to around 40,000 people between 1477 and 1535, while Thessaloniki's Jewish community, nonexistent in 1478, grew to over 16,500 by 1519, accounting for more than 60% of the city's population by 1567–68. Similar growth occurred in cities such as Edirne and Bursa.

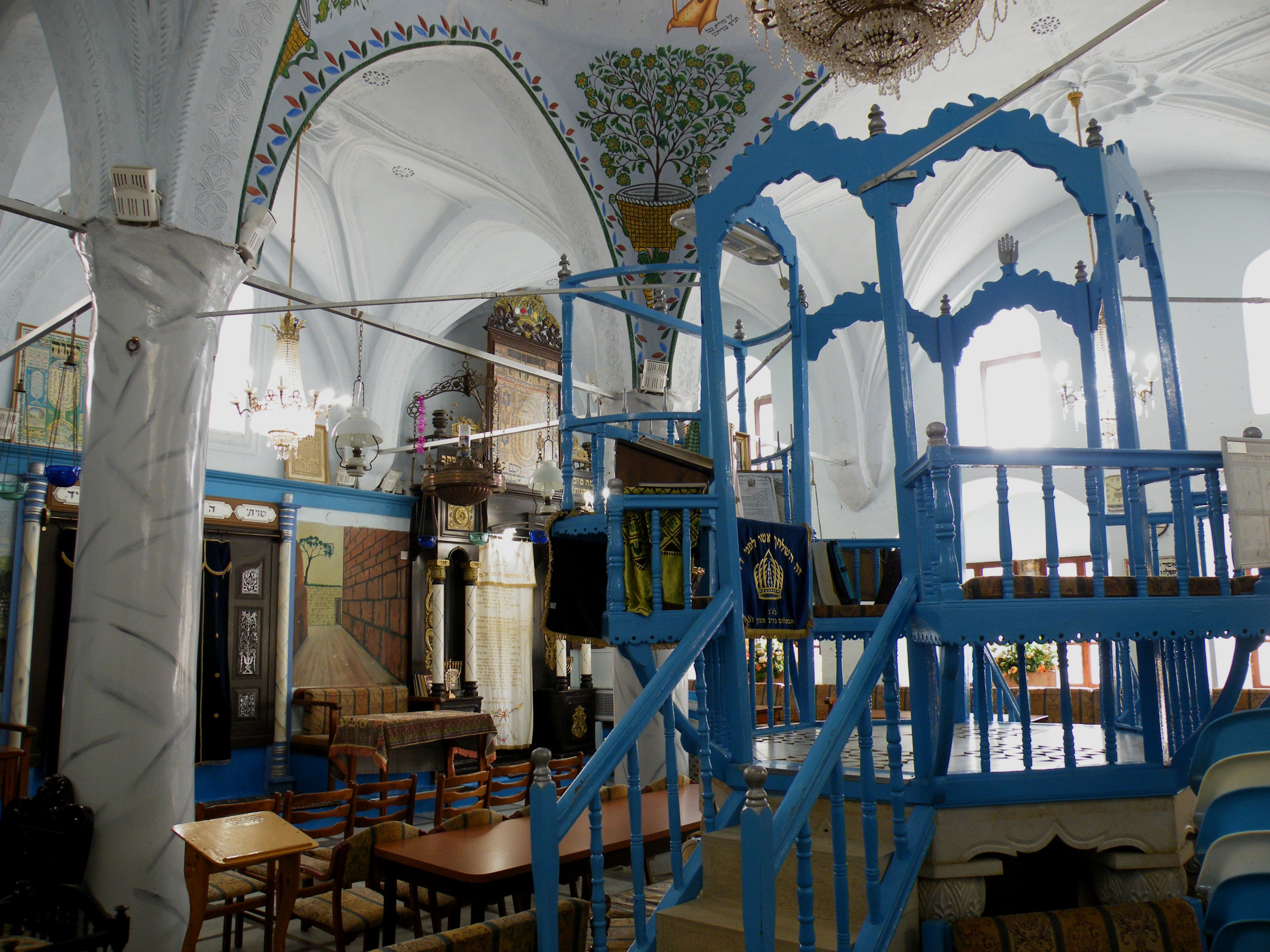
Abuhav Synagogue, Safed

Similarly, Safed expanded rapidly in the 16th century, emerging as a major spiritual and scholarly center that drew scholars from across the Ottoman Empire, Italy, and North Africa. Under the leadership of figures such as Solomon Alkabetz, Moses Cordovero, and Isaac Luria, the town produced influential works of Jewish liturgy and mysticism. The halakhic codification by Joseph Karo in his Beit Yosef and Shulchan Aruch established normative standards across the Jewish world.

=== In North Africa ===
In Algiers, Sephardic figures such as Simon ben Zemah Duran, who fled Mallorca after 1391, and his son Solomon became prominent leaders in both rabbinic and scientific thought. Meanwhile, Abraham Zacuto, who fled Portugal in 1497, continued his astronomical work in Tunis.

A sizable Sephardic community had settled in Morocco and other Northern African countries, which were colonized by France in the 19th century. Jews in Algeria were given French citizenship in 1870 by the décret Crémieux (previously Jews and Muslims could apply for French citizenship, but had to renounce the use of traditional religious courts and laws, which many did not want to do). When France withdrew from Algeria in 1962, the local Jewish communities largely relocated to France. There are some tensions between some of those communities and the earlier French Jewish population (who were mostly Ashkenazi Jews), and with Arabic-Muslim communities.

The Sephardim distinguished themselves as physicians and statesmen, and won the favor of rulers and princes, in both the Christian and the Islamic world. That the Sephardim were selected for prominent positions in every country where they settled was only in part due to the fact that Spanish had become a world-language through the expansion of Spain into the world-spanning Spanish Empire—the cosmopolitan cultural background after long associations with Islamic scholars of the Sephardic families also made them extremely well educated for the times, even well into the European Enlightenment.

=== Conversos and crypto-Jews in Spain and Portugal ===
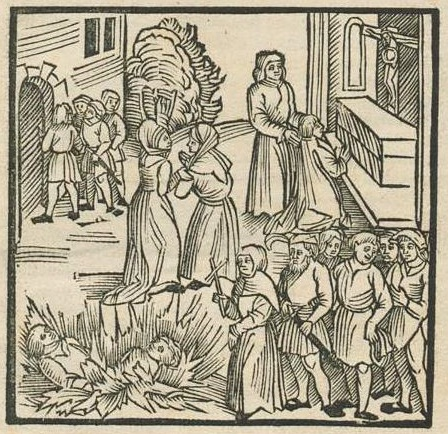
A representation of the Lisbon massacre in 1506

Following the expulsions of Jews from Spain and Portugal, substantial populations of conversos (or New Christians) remained in both kingdoms. While many assimilated over time, others secretly preserved aspects of Jewish life, a phenomenon now known as crypto-Judaism. These individuals were often referred to pejoratively as marranos in Iberian sources. Suspicions of "Judaizing" led to episodes of violence, most notably the 1506 Lisbon Massacre, in which a mob, incited by Dominican friars, murdered up to 2,000 New Christians over three days. Joining the Spanish Inquisition was the Portuguese Inquisition, established in 1536; both branches of the Holy Office targeted conversos for investigation and punishment for centuries to come. As Spain and Portugal expanded their empires, many converso families migrated to colonial territories, where local inquisitorial tribunals continued to investigate and prosecute suspected crypto-Jews.

Inquisition records reveal widespread surveillance and prosecution of conversos for suspected "Judaizing." Individuals were denounced for actions such as lighting candles on Friday evenings, fasting on Yom Kippur, wearing clean white garments before the Sabbath, or preparing traditional Jewish foods on holidays. Suspects were frequently subjected to torture during interrogations. As ecclesiastical courts lacked the authority to impose capital punishment, those found guilty were transferred to secular authorities, who carried out sentences such as execution by burning—a penalty justified within Church doctrine as the purification of the soul through suffering. The inquisitions staged autos-de-fé—ritualized public ceremonies that included processions, sermons, confessions, and executions—sometimes in the presence of monarchs. Those who confessed were forced to wear sanbenitos, humiliating garments bearing their alleged offenses, with their names publicly displayed in churches for generations. Even the deceased or those who had fled could be condemned in absentia, with effigies burned or graves exhumed and desecrated as symbolic acts of punishment.

Despite these persecutions, many conversos continued to observe aspects of Judaism in secret. In Portugal, emigration of converso families to more tolerant regions continued for centuries. Upon reaching relative safety, such as in parts of the Ottoman Empire, North Africa, or the Netherlands, some families openly returned to Judaism. Others remained in Iberia and preserved their traditions covertly. A notable example is the community of Belmonte in central Portugal, where crypto-Jewish practices were maintained in isolation for generations and only came to light in the early 20th century, after external contact revealed to them the broader Jewish world.

In contrast to Ashkenazi jews, Sephardic jews associated freely with their social equals, without regard to religion and more likely with regard to equivalent or comparative education, for they were generally well-read —which became a Sephardic educational tradition and an expectation for generations to come. They were received at the courts of sultans, kings, and princes, and were often employed as ambassadors, envoys, or official agents. The number of Sephardim who have rendered important services to different countries is considerable as Samuel Abravanel (or "Abrabanel"—financial counselor to the viceroy of Naples) or Moses Curiel (or "Jeromino Nunes da Costa" —serving as Agent to the Crown of Portugal in the Dutch United Provinces). Among other names mentioned are those of Belmonte, Nasi, Francisco Pacheco, Blas, Pedro de Herrera, Palache, Pimentel, Azevedo, Sagaste, Salvador, Sasportas, Costa, Curiel, Cansino, Schönenberg, Sapoznik (Zapatero), Toledo, Miranda, Toledano, Pereira, and Teixeira.

=== England ===
Sephardic Jews came to England in the mid-17th century. Initially arriving from France and Portugal, often passing through Holland, they were the first Jewish group to settle in England in significant numbers after the Jews had been expelled in 1290. By 1680, there were about 2,000 Sephardic Jews in London.

=== The Netherlands ===
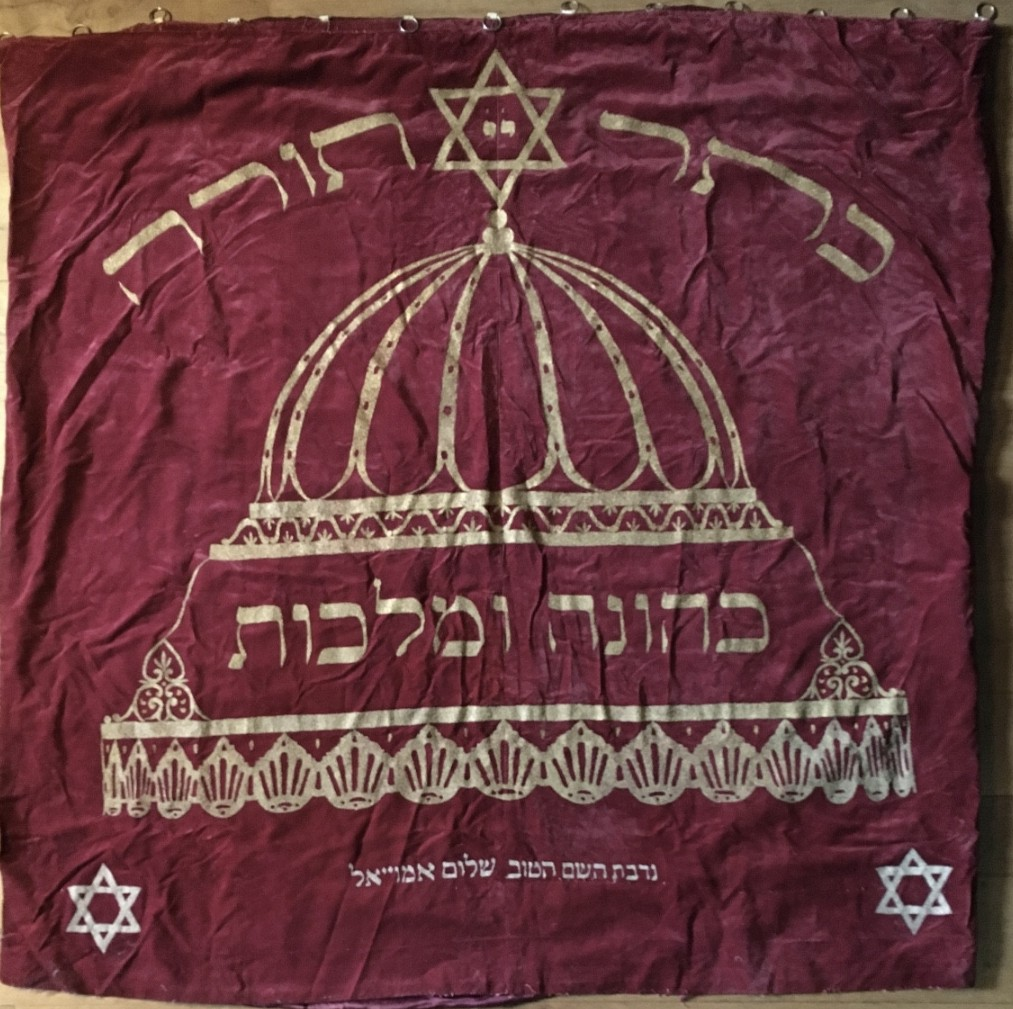
Portuguese Sephardic parochet, silk and metallic embroidery, c. 1760–1770, reflecting the synagogue traditions of Sephardic communities in Amsterdam and the Iberian diaspora.

In Amsterdam, where Jews were especially prominent in the 17th century on account of their number, wealth, education, and influence, they established poetical academies after Spanish models; two of these were the Academia de Los Sitibundos and the Academia de Los Floridos. In the same city they also organized the first Jewish educational institution, with graduate classes in which, in addition to Talmudic studies, the instruction was given in the Hebrew language. The most important synagogue, or Esnoga, as it is usually called amongst Spanish and Portuguese Jews, is the Amsterdam Esnoga—usually considered the "mother synagogue", and the historical center of the Amsterdam minhag.

In a letter dated 25 November 1622, King Christian IV of Denmark invites Jews of Amsterdam to settle in Glückstadt, where, among other privileges, the free exercise of their religion would be assured to them.

Besides merchants, a great number of physicians were among the Spanish Jews in Amsterdam: Samuel Abravanel, David Nieto, Elijah Montalto, and the Bueno family; Joseph Bueno was consulted in the illness of Prince Maurice (April 1623). Jews were admitted as students at the university, where they studied medicine as the only branch of the science of practical use to them, for they were not permitted to practice law, and the oath they would be compelled to take excluded them from the professorships. Neither were Jews taken into the trade-guilds: a resolution passed by the city of Amsterdam in 1632 (the cities being autonomous) excluded them. Exceptions, however, were made in the case of trades that related to their religion: printing, bookselling, and the selling of meat, poultry, groceries, and drugs. In 1655, a Jew was, exceptionally, permitted to establish a sugar-refinery.

=== Eastern Europe ===
The Sephardic kehilla in Zamość in the 16th and 17th centuries was one of its kind in all of Poland at that time. It was an autonomous institution, and until the mid-17th century it was not under the authority of the highest organ of the Jewish self-government in the Republic of Poland - the Council of Four Lands.

=== In the New World ===
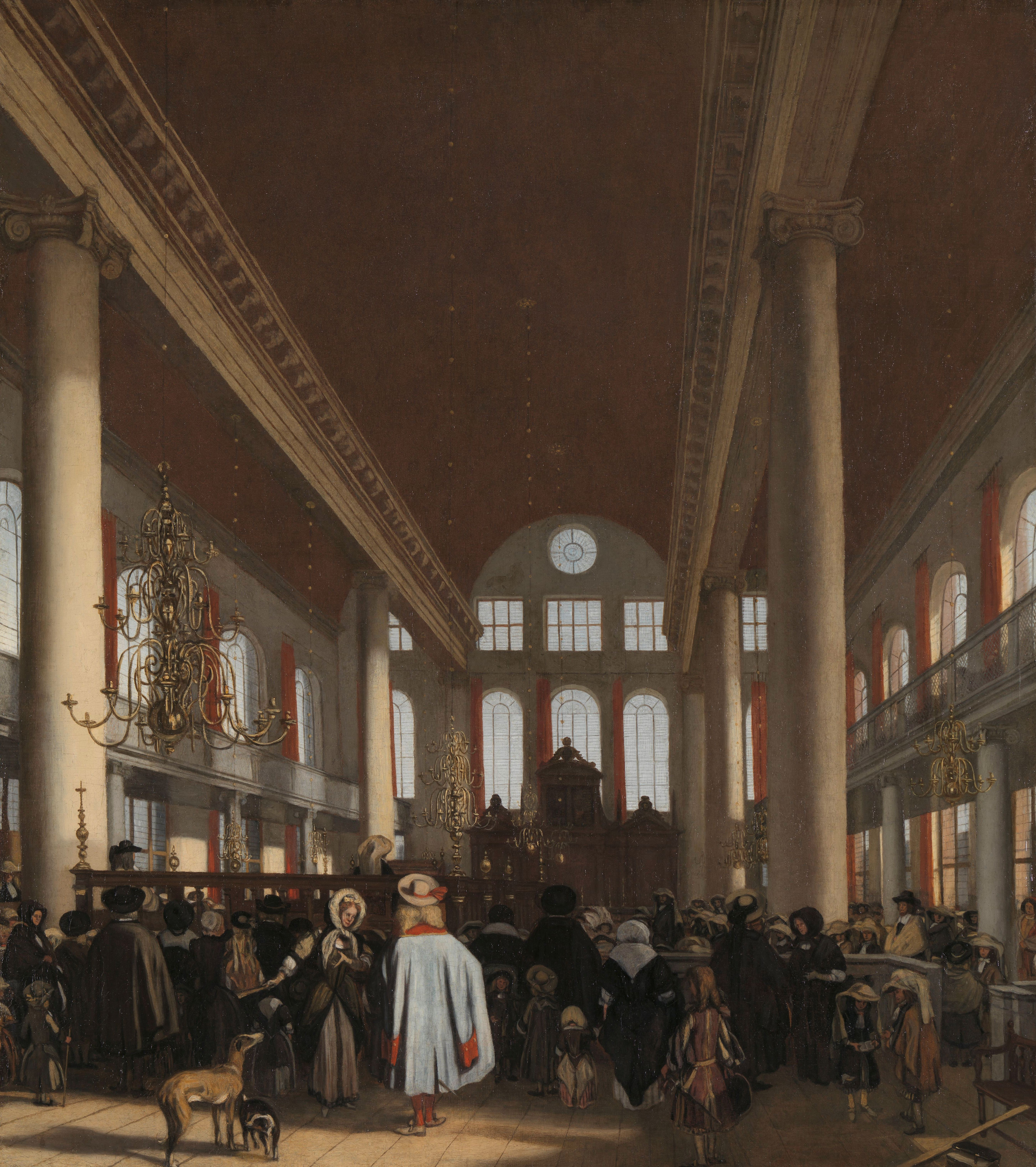
Interior of the Portuguese synagogue in Amsterdam, c. 1680

The largest part of Spanish Jews expelled in 1492 fled to Portugal, where they eluded persecution for a few years. The Jewish community in Portugal was perhaps then some 15% of that country's population. They were declared Christians by Royal decree unless they left, but the King hindered their departure, needing their artisanship and working population for Portugal's overseas enterprises and territories. Later Sephardic Jews settled in many trade areas controlled by the Empire of Philip II and others. With various countries in Europe also the Sephardic Jews established commercial relations.

Álvaro Caminha, in Cape Verde islands, who received the land as a grant from the crown, established a colony with Jews forced to stay on the island of São Tomé. Príncipe island was settled in 1500 under a similar arrangement. Attracting settlers proved difficult, however, the Jewish settlement was a success and their descendants settled many parts of Brazil. In 1579 Luis de Carvajal y de la Cueva a Portuguese-born Converso, Spanish-Crown officer, was awarded a large swath of territory in New Spain, known as Nuevo Reino de León. He founded settlements with other conversos that would later become Monterrey.

In particular, Jews established relations between the Dutch and South America. They contributed to the establishment of the Dutch West Indies Company in 1621, and some were members of the directorate. The ambitious schemes of the Dutch for the conquest of Brazil were carried into effect through Francisco Ribeiro, a Portuguese captain, who is said to have had Jewish relations in the Netherlands. Some years afterward, when the Dutch in Brazil appealed to the Netherlands for craftsmen of all kinds, many Jews went to Brazil. About 600 Jews left Amsterdam in 1642, accompanied by two distinguished scholars—Isaac Aboab da Fonseca and Moses Raphael de Aguilar. Jews supported the Dutch in the struggle between the Netherlands and Portugal for possession of Brazil.

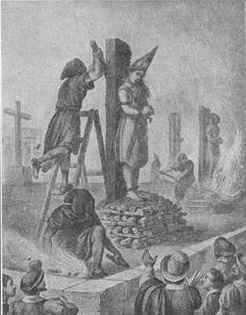
Execution of Mariana de Carabajal in Mexico City, daughter of Francisca Nuñez de Carabajal, in 1601 by the Santo Oficio.

In 1642, Aboab da Fonseca was appointed rabbi at Kahal Zur Israel Synagogue in the Dutch colony of Pernambuco (Recife), Brazil. Most of the white inhabitants of the town were Sephardic Jews from Portugal who had been banned by the Portuguese Inquisition to this town at the other side of the Atlantic Ocean. In 1624, the colony had been occupied by the Dutch. By becoming the rabbi of the community, Aboab da Fonseca was the first appointed rabbi of the Americas. The name of his congregation was Kahal Zur Israel Synagogue and the community had a synagogue, a mikveh and a yeshiva as well. However, during the time he was a rabbi in Pernambuco, the Portuguese re-occupied the place again in 1654, after a struggle of nine years. Aboab da Fonseca managed to return to Amsterdam after the occupation of the Portuguese. Members of his community immigrated to North America and were among the founders of New York City, but some Jews took refuge in Seridó.

As Sephardic Jews continued to travel westward, they eventually landed in North America in 1654 by chance. Sephardic Jews arrived in New Amsterdam with French merchants who saved them after they were robbed at sea. Once in the Dutch colony they connected with the Sephardic Jews in the Dutch East India Company who helped them establish businesses in the Americas involving skilled labor. Because of this Sephardic Jews developed into an elite class, but were still persecuted for their religion.

The Sephardic Jews made active efforts to integrate into society while keeping their Sephardic practices. In New York, Jews began contributing to the city's population by donating to church construction and taking official positions. Figures such as Joseph Salvador immigrated to the colonies and began actively participating in society with wealth to gain more rights. Sephardic Jews were leading taxpayers, meaning the town would suffer without them, allowing for Jews to slowly gain more rights until the British took over the colony in 1740. As both taxpayers and active members of the community, Jews were slowly less restricted by the law, so that by the time Britain took the Dutch colonies, the only rights they lacked were to work in retail trade and worship in public spaces.

Jonathan Ray, a professor of Jewish theological studies, has argued that the community of Sephardim was formed more during the 1600s than the medieval period. He explains that prior to expulsion Spanish Jewish communities did not have a shared identity in the sense that developed in diaspora. They did not carry any particular Hispano-Jewish identity into exile with them, but certain shared cultural traits contributed to the formation of the diaspora community from what had historically been independent communities.

== Modern history ==
=== The Holocaust ===
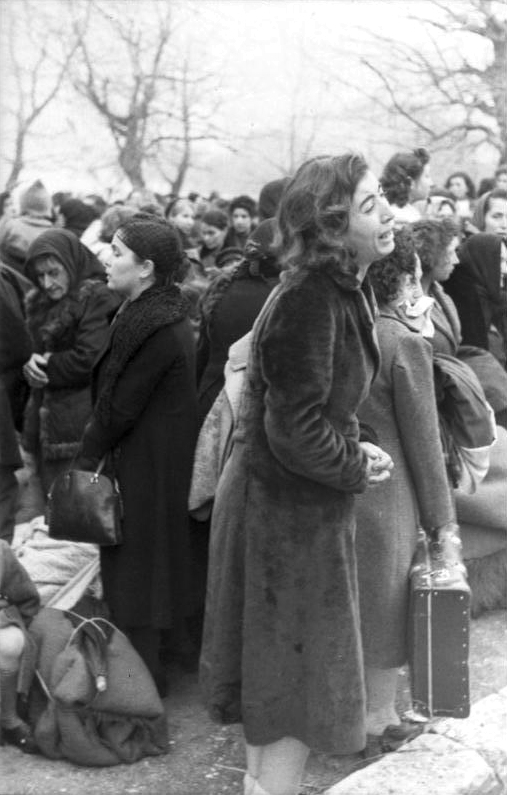
A young woman weeps during the deportation of Jews of Ioannina (Greece) on 25 March 1944.

The Holocaust that devastated European Jewry and virtually destroyed its centuries-old culture also wiped out the great European population centers of Sephardic Jewry and led to the almost complete destruction of its unique language and traditions. Sephardi Jewish communities from France and the Netherlands in the northwest to Yugoslavia and Greece in the southeast almost disappeared.

On the eve of World War II, the European Sephardi community was concentrated in Southeastern Europe countries of Greece, Yugoslavia, and Bulgaria. Its leading centers were in Salonika, Sarajevo, Belgrade, and Sofia. The experience of Jewish communities in those countries during the war varied greatly and depended on the type of regime under which they fell.

The Jewish communities of Yugoslavia and northern Greece, including the 50,000 Jews of Salonika, fell under direct German occupation in April 1941 and bore the full weight and intensity of Nazi repressive measures from dispossession, humiliation, and forced labor to hostage-taking, and finally deportation to the Auschwitz concentration camp and extermination.

The Jewish population of southern Greece fell under the jurisdiction of the Italians who eschewed the enactment of anti-Jewish legislation and resisted whenever possible German efforts to transfer them to occupied Poland, until the surrender of Italy on 8 September 1943 brought the Jews under German control.

Sephardi Jews in Bosnia and Croatia were ruled by a German-created Independent State of Croatia state from April 1941, which subjected them to pogrom-like actions before herding them into local camps where they were murdered side by side with Serbs and Roma (see Porajmos). The Jews of Macedonia and Thrace were controlled by Bulgarian occupation forces, which after rendering them stateless, rounded them up and turned them over to the Germans for deportation.

Finally, the Jews of Bulgaria proper were under the rule of a Nazi ally that subjected them to ruinous anti-Jewish legislation, but ultimately yielded to pressure from Bulgarian parliamentarians, clerics, and intellectuals not to deport them. More than 50,000 Bulgarian Jews were thus saved.

The Jews in North Africa identified themselves only as Jews or European Jews, having been westernized by French and Italian colonization. During World War II and until Operation Torch, the Jews of Morocco, Algeria, and Tunisia, governed by pro-Nazi Vichy France, suffered the same antisemitic legislation that Jews suffered in France mainland. They did not, however, directly suffer the more extreme Nazi Germany antisemitic policies, and nor did the Jews in Italian Libya. The Jewish communities in those European North Africa countries, in Bulgaria, and in Denmark were the only ones who were spared the mass deportation and mass murder that afflicted other Jewish communities. Operation Torch therefore saved more than 400,000 Jews in European North Africa.

=== Later history and culture ===
The Jews in French Algeria were awarded French citizenship by 1870 Crémieux Decree. They were therefore considered part of the European pieds noirs community in spite of having been established in North Africa for many centuries, rather than subject to the Indigénat status imposed on their Muslim former neighbors. Most consequently moved to France in the late 1950s and early 1960s after Tunisia, Morocco and Algeria became independent, and they now make up a majority of the French Jewish community.

Today, the Sephardim have preserved the romances and the ancient melodies and songs of Spain and Portugal, as well as a large number of old Portuguese and Spanish proverbs. A number of children's plays, like, for example, El Castillo, are still popular among them, and they still manifest a fondness for the dishes peculiar to Iberia, such as the pastel, or pastelico, a sort of meat-pie, and the pan de España, or pan de León. At their festivals, they follow the Spanish custom of distributing dulces, or dolces, a confection wrapped in paper bearing a picture of the magen David (six-pointed star).

In Mexico, the Sephardic community originates mainly from Syria, Turkey, Greece, and Bulgaria. In 1942 the Colegio Hebreo Tarbut was founded in collaboration with the Ashkenazi family and instruction was in Yiddish. In 1944, the Sephardim community established a separate "Colegio Hebreo Sefaradí" with 90 students where instruction was in Hebrew and complemented with classes on Jewish customs. By 1950, there were 500 students. In 1968, a group of young Sephardim created the group Tnuat Noar Jinujit Dor Jadash in support of the creation of the state of Israel. In 1972 the Majazike Tora institute is created aiming to prepare young male Jews for their Bar Mitzvah.

While the majority of American Jews today are Ashkenazim, in colonial times Sephardim made up the majority of the Jewish population. For example, the 1654 Jews who arrived in New Amsterdam fled from the colony of Recife, Brazil after the Portuguese seized it from the Dutch. Through most of the 18th century, American synagogues conducted and recorded their business in Portuguese, even if their daily language was English. It was not until widespread German immigration to the United States in the 19th century that the tables turned and Ashkenazim (initially from Germany but by the 20th century from Eastern Europe) began to dominate the American Jewish landscape.

=== Citizenship laws in Spain and Portugal ===
Since April 2013, Sephardim who are descendants of those expelled in the inquisition are entitled to claim Portuguese citizenship provided that they "belong to a Sephardic community of Portuguese origin with ties to Portugal". The amendment to Portugal's "Law on Nationality" was approved unanimously on 11 April 2013, and remains open to applications as of March 2023.

A similar law was approved in Spain in 2014 and passed in 2015. By the expiry date on 30 September 2019, Spain had received 127,000 applications, mostly from Latin America.

=== Sephardim in modern Iberia ===
Today, around 50,000 recognized Jews live in Spain, according to the Federation of Jewish Communities of Spain. The tiny Jewish community in Portugal is estimated between 1,740 and 3,000 people. Although some are of Ashkenazi origin, the majority are Sephardic Jews who returned to Spain after the end of the protectorate over northern Morocco. A community of 600 Sephardic Jews live in Gibraltar.

In 2011 Rabbi Nissim Karelitz, a leading rabbi and Halachic authority and chairman of the Beit Din Tzedek rabbinical court in Bnei Brak, Israel, recognized the entire community of Sephardi descendants in Palma de Mallorca, the Chuetas, as Jewish. They number approximately 18,000 people or just over 2% of the entire population of the island.

Of the Bnei Anusim community in Belmonte, Portugal, some officially returned to Judaism in the 1970s. They opened a synagogue, Bet Eliahu, in 1996. The Belmonte community of Bnei Anusim as a whole, however, have not yet been granted the same recognition as Jews that the Chuetas of Palma de Mallorca achieved in 2011.

== Citizenship laws by descent ==
=== Spanish citizenship by Iberian Sephardic descent ===
In 1924, the Dictatorship of Primo de Rivera approved a decree to enable Sephardi Jews to obtain Spanish nationality. Although the deadline was originally the end of 1930, diplomat Ángel Sanz Briz used this decree as the basis for giving Spanish citizenship papers to Hungarian Jews in the Second World War to try to save them from the Nazis.

Today, Spanish nationality law generally requires a period of residency in Spain before citizenship can be applied for. This had long been relaxed from ten to two years for Sephardi Jews, Hispanic Americans, and others with historical ties to Spain. In that context, Sephardi Jews were considered to be the descendants of Spanish Jews who were expelled or fled from the country five centuries ago following the expulsion of the Jews from Spain in 1492.

In 2015, the government of Spain passed Law 12/2015 of 24 June, whereby Sephardi Jews with a connection to Spain could obtain Spanish nationality by naturalization, without the usual residency requirement. Applicants must provide evidence of their Sephardi origin and some connection with Spain, and pass examinations on the language, government, and culture of Spain.

The Law establishes the right to Spanish nationality of Sephardi Jews with a connection to Spain who apply within three years from 1 October 2015. The law defines Sephardic as Jews who lived in the Iberian Peninsula until their expulsion in the late fifteenth century, and their descendants. The law provides for the deadline to be extended by one year, to 1 October 2019; it was extended in March 2018. It was modified in 2015 to remove a provision that required persons acquiring Spanish nationality by law 12/2015 must renounce any other nationality held. Most applicants must pass tests of knowledge of the Spanish language and Spanish culture, but those who are under 18, or handicapped, are exempted. A Resolution in May 2017 also exempted those aged over 70.

The Sephardic citizenship law was set to expire in October 2018 but was extended for an additional year by the Spanish government.

The law states that Spanish citizenship will be granted to "those Sephardic foreign nationals who prove that [Sephardic] condition and their special relationship with our country, even if they do not have legal residence in Spain, whatever their [current] ideology, religion or beliefs."

Eligibility criteria for proving Sephardic descent include: a certificate issued by the Federation of Jewish Communities of Spain, or the production of a certificate from the competent rabbinic authority, legally recognized in the country of habitual residence of the applicant, or other documentation which might be considered appropriate for this purpose; or by justifying one's inclusion as a Sephardic descendant, or a direct descendant of persons included in the list of protected Sephardic families in Spain referred to in the Decree-Law of 29 December 1948, or descendants of those who obtained naturalization by way of the Royal Decree of 20 December 1924; or by the combination of other factors including surnames of the applicant, spoken family language (Spanish, Ladino, Haketia), and other evidence attesting descent from Sephardic Jews and a relationship to Spain. Surnames alone, language alone, or other evidence alone will not be determinative in the granting of Spanish nationality.

The connection with Spain can be established, if kinship with a family on a list of Sephardic families in Spain is not available, by proving that Spanish history or culture have been studied, proof of charitable, cultural, or economic activities associated with Spanish people, or organizations, or Sephardic culture.

The path to Spanish citizenship for Sephardic applicants remained costly and arduous. The Spanish government took about 8–10 months to decide on each case. By March 2018, some 6,432 people had been granted Spanish citizenship under the law. A total of about 132,000 applications were received, 67,000 of them in the month before the 30 September 2019 deadline. Applications for Portuguese citizenship for Sephardis remained open. The deadline for completing the requirements was extended until September 2021 due to delays due to the COVID-19 pandemic, but only for those who had made a preliminary application by 1 October 2019.

In what appeared to be a reciprocal gesture, Natan Sharansky, chairman of the quasi-governmental Jewish Agency for Israel, said "the state of Israel must ease the way for their return", referring to the millions of descendants of conversos around Latin America and Iberia. Some hundreds of thousands maybe exploring ways to return to the Jewish people.

=== Portuguese citizenship by Portuguese Sephardic descent ===
In April 2013, Portugal amended its Law on Nationality to confer citizenship to descendants of Portuguese Sephardic Jews who were expelled from the country five centuries ago following the Portuguese Inquisition.

The amended law gave descendants of Portuguese Sephardic Jews the right to become Portuguese citizens, wherever they lived, if they "belong to a Sephardic community of Portuguese origin with ties to Portugal." Portugal thus became the first country after Israel to enact a Jewish Law of Return.

On 29 January 2015, the Portuguese Parliament ratified the legislation offering dual citizenship to descendants of Portuguese Sephardic Jews. Like the law later passed in Spain, the newly established legal rights in Portugal apply to all descendants of Portugal's Sephardic Jews, regardless of the current religion of the descendant, so long as the descendant can demonstrate "a traditional connection" to Portuguese Sephardic Jews. This may be through "family names, family language, and direct or collateral ancestry." Portuguese nationality law was amended to this effect by Decree-Law n.º 43/2013, and further amended by Decree-Law n.º 30-A/2015, which came into effect on 1 March 2015. «Applicants for Portuguese citizenship via this route are assessed by experts at one of Portugal's Jewish communities in either Lisbon or Porto».

In a reciprocal response to the Portuguese legislation, Michael Freund, Chairman of Shavei Israel told news agencies in 2015 that he "call[s] on the Israeli government to embark on a new strategic approach and to reach out to the [Sephardic] Bnei Anousim, people whose Spanish and Portuguese Jewish ancestors were compelled to convert to Catholicism more than five centuries ago."

By July 2017 the Portuguese government had received about 5,000 applications, mostly from Brazil, Israel, and Turkey. 400 had been granted, with a period between application and resolution of about two years. In 2017 a total of 1,800 applicants had been granted Portuguese citizenship. By February 2018, 12,000 applications were in process.

== Divisions ==
The divisions among Sephardim and their descendants today are largely a result of the consequences of the royal edicts of expulsion. Both the Spanish and Portuguese crowns ordered their respective Jewish subjects to choose one of two options:

1. to convert to Catholicism and be allowed to remain within the kingdom, or
2. to remain Jewish and leave or be expelled by the stipulated deadline.

In the case of the Alhambra Decree of 1492, the primary purpose was to eliminate Jewish influence on Spain's large converso population, and ensure they did not revert to Judaism. Over half of Spain's Jews had converted in the 14th century as a result of the religious persecution and pogroms which occurred in 1391. They and their Catholic descendants were not subject to the decree or to expulsion, yet were surveilled by the Spanish Inquisition. British scholar Henry Kamen has said that

"the real purpose of the 1492 edict likely was not expulsion, but compulsory conversion and assimilation of all Spanish Jews, a process which had been underway for a number of centuries. Indeed, a further number of those Jews who had not yet joined the converso community finally chose to convert and avoid expulsion as a result of the edict. As a result of the Alhambra decree and persecution during the prior century, between 200,000 and 250,000 Jews converted to Catholicism and between one third and one half of Spain's remaining 100,000 non-converted Jews chose exile, with an indeterminate number returning to Spain in the years following the expulsion."

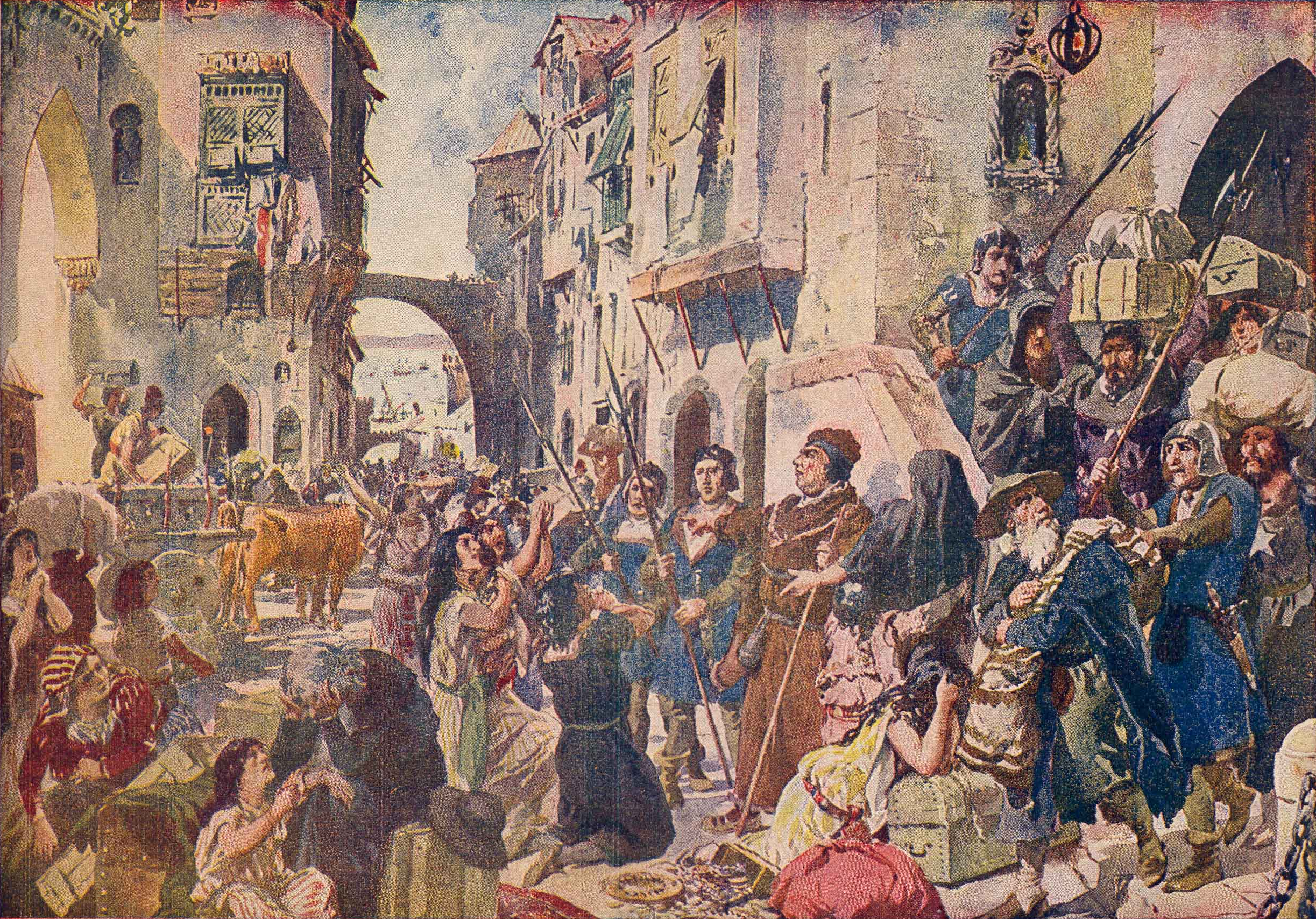
"The Banishment of the Jews", by Roque Gameiro, in Quadros da História de Portugal ("Pictures of the History of Portugal", 1917).

The Portuguese king John II welcomed the Jewish refugees from Spain with the purpose of obtaining specialized artisans, which the Portuguese population lacked, imposing over them, however, a hefty fee for the right to stay in the country. His successor King Manuel I proved, at first, to also tolerate the Jewish population. However, King Manuel I issued his own expulsion decree four years later, presumably to satisfy a precondition that the Spanish monarchs had set for him in order to allow him to marry their daughter Isabella. While the stipulations were similar in the Portuguese decree, King Manuel largely prevented Portugal's Jews from leaving, by blocking Portugal's ports of exit, foreseeing a negative economic effect of a similar Jewish flight from Portugal. He decided that the Jews who stayed accepted Catholicism by default, proclaiming them New Christians by royal decree. Physical forced conversions, however, were also suffered by Jews throughout Portugal. These persecutions led to several recently converted families to flee Portugal, such as the family of Francisco Sanches who fled to Bordeaux.

Sephardi Jews encompass Jews descended from those Jews who left the Iberian Peninsula as Jews by the expiration of the respective decreed deadlines. This group is further divided between those who fled south to North Africa, as opposed to those who fled eastwards to the Balkans, West Asia and beyond. Others fled east into Europe, with many settling in northern Italy and the Low Countries. Also included among Sephardi Jews are those who descend from "New Christian" conversos, but returned to Judaism after leaving Iberia, largely after reaching Southern and Western Europe.

From these regions, many migrated again later on, this time to the non-Iberian territories of the Americas. Additional to all these Sephardic Jewish groups are the descendants of those New Christian conversos who either remained in Iberia, or moved from Iberia directly to the Iberian colonial possessions in what are today the various Latin American countries. For historical reasons and circumstances, most of the descendants of this group of conversos never formally returned to the Jewish religion.

All these sub-groups are defined by a combination of geography, identity, religious evolution, language evolution, and the timeframe of their reversion (for those who had in the interim undergone a temporary nominal conversion to Catholicism) or non-reversion back to Judaism.

These Sephardic sub-groups are separate from any pre-existing local Jewish communities they encountered in their new areas of settlement. From the perspective of the present day, the first three sub-groups appeared to have developed as separate branches, each with its own traditions.

In earlier centuries, and as late as the editing of the Jewish Encyclopedia at the beginning of the 20th century, the Sephardim were usually regarded as together forming a continuum. The Jewish community of Livorno, Italy acted as the clearing-house of personnel and traditions among the first three sub-groups; it also developed as the chief publishing centre.

=== Eastern Sephardim ===
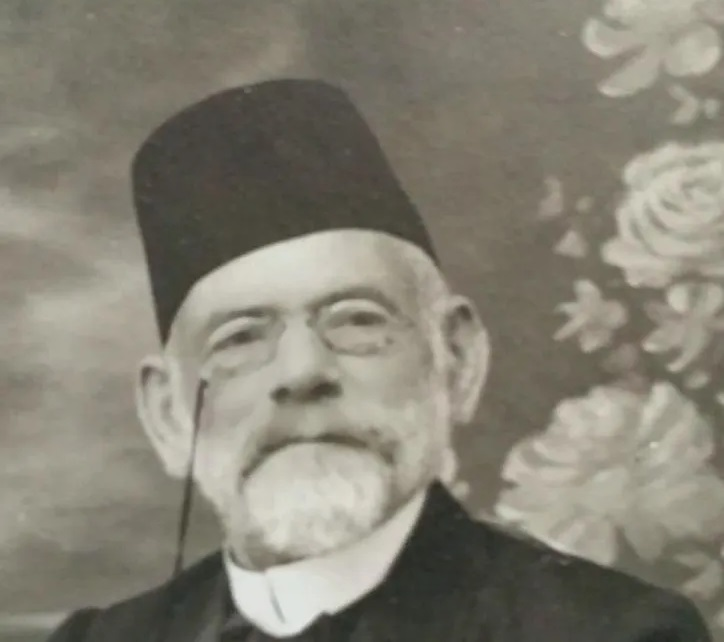
Zeki Effendi, a prominent personality from the history of Bosnian Jews

Eastern Sephardim consist of the descendants of the expellees from Spain who left as Jews in 1492 or earlier. This sub-group of Sephardim settled mostly in various parts of the Ottoman Empire, which then included areas in West Asia's Near East such as Anatolia, the Levant and Egypt; in Southeastern Europe, some of the Dodecanese islands and the Balkans. They settled particularly in European cities ruled by the Ottoman Empire, including Salonica in present-day Greece; Constantinople, which today is known as Istanbul on the European portion of modern Turkey; and Sarajevo, in what is today Bosnia and Herzegovina. Sephardic Jews also lived in Bulgaria, where they absorbed into their community the Romaniote Jews they found already living there. They had a presence as well in Walachia in what is today southern Romania, where there is still a functioning Sephardic Synagogue. Their traditional language is referred to as Judezmo ("Jewish [language]"). It is Judaeo-Spanish, also known as Ladino, which consisted of the medieval Spanish and Portuguese they spoke in Iberia, with admixtures of Hebrew, and the languages around them, especially Turkish. It was often written in Rashi script.

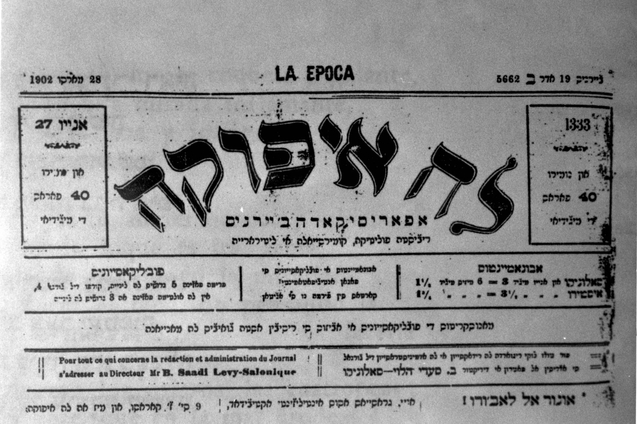
A 1902 issue of La Epoca, a Ladino newspaper from Salonica (Thessaloniki)

Regarding the Middle East, some Sephardim went further east into the West Asian territories of the Ottoman Empire, settling among the long-established Arabic-speaking Jewish communities in Damascus and Aleppo in Syria, as well as in the Land of Israel, and as far as Baghdad in Iraq. Although technically Egypt was a North African Ottoman region, those Jews who settled in Alexandria are included in this group, due to Egypt's cultural proximity to the other West Asian provinces under Ottoman rule.

For the most part, Eastern Sephardim did not maintain their own separate Sephardic religious and cultural institutions from pre-existing Jews. Instead the local Jews came to adopt the liturgical customs of the recent Sephardic arrivals. Eastern Sephardim in European areas of the Ottoman Empire, as well as in Palestine, retained their culture and language, but those in the other parts of the West Asian portion gave up their language and adopted the local Judeo-Arabic dialect. This latter phenomenon is just one of the factors which have today led to the broader and eclectic religious definition of Sephardi Jews.

Thus, the Jewish communities in Palestine, Lebanon, Syria, and Egypt are partly of Spanish Jewish origin and they are counted as Sephardim proper. The great majority of the Jewish communities in Iraq, and all of those in Iran, Eastern Syria, Yemen, and Eastern Turkey, are descendants of pre-existing indigenous Jewish populations. They adopted the Sephardic rites and traditions through cultural diffusion, and are properly termed Mizrahi Jews.

Going even further into South Asia, a few of the Eastern Sephardim followed the spice trade routes as far as the Malabar coast of southern India, where they settled among the established Cochin Jewish community. Their culture and customs were absorbed by the local Jews.. Additionally, there was a large community of Jews and crypto-Jews of Portuguese origin in the Portuguese colony of Goa. Gaspar Jorge de Leão Pereira, the first archbishop of Goa, wanted to suppress or expel that community, calling for the initiation of the Goa Inquisition against the Sephardic Jews in India.

In recent times, principally after 1948, most Eastern Sephardim have since relocated to Israel, and others to the US and Latin America.

Among Eastern Sephardim, many still carry common Spanish surnames, as well as other specifically Sephardic surnames from 15th-century Spain with Arabic or Hebrew language origins (such as Azoulay, Abulafia, Abravanel) which have since disappeared from Spain when those that stayed behind as conversos adopted surnames that were solely Spanish in origin. Other Eastern Sephardim have since also translated their Hispanic surnames into the languages of the regions they settled in, or have modified them to make them sound more local.

=== North African Sephardim ===
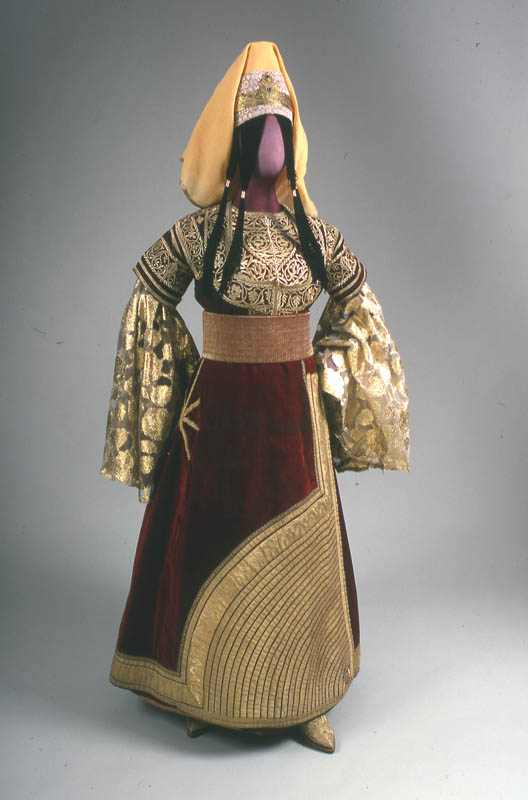
19th-century Moroccan Sephardic wedding dress

North African Sephardim — Maghrebi Jews — are the descendants of the expelled refugees from Spain who also left as Jews in 1492. This branch settled in North Africa (except Egypt, see Eastern Sephardim above). Settling mostly in Morocco and Algeria, they spoke a variant of Judaeo-Spanish known as Haketia. They also spoke Judeo-Arabic in a majority of cases.

North African Sephardim primarily settled in northern Morocco, in Tangier, Fez, and Tétouan. Sephardic Moroccan Jews form a major subgroup of the global Sephardic Jewish population.

Smaller communities also settled in the coastal cities of the Mediterranean Maghreb, and in other areas with already-established Arabic-speaking Jewish communities throughout the region — eventually merging with local Jewish populations to form new communities based solely on Sephardic customs.

Some Moroccan Jews later returned to the Iberian Peninsula to form the core of Gibraltar Jews.

In the 19th century, Spanish and French gradually began to replace Haketia and Judeo-Arabic as the languages of most Moroccan Sephardim and other North African Sephardim.

After Algeria’s independence, the majority of Sephardic Algerian Jews (who were granted French citizenship in 1870 by decree) relocated to France.

During the 1960s until the 1980s, many Sephardic Moroccan Jews and Sephardic Tunisian Jews began emigrating to France, Canada, the United States, and Israel.

The Sephardic Jewish population (mainly Maghrebi Jews) is estimated at 1.4 million in Israel (2015). France and the Americas also have significant Sephardic Jewish populations (approximately 360,000 and approximately 300,000, respectively)

As of 2015, there was a significant community still in Morocco (10,000). In 2021, among Arab countries, the largest Jewish communities now exist in Morocco with about 2,500 Jews and in Tunisia with about 1,000.

North African Sephardim often continue to carry common Spanish surnames, as well as other specifically Sephardic surnames from 15th century Spain with Arabic or Hebrew language origins (such as Azoulay, Abulafia, Abravanel) which have since disappeared from Spain (when those who stayed behind as Conversos adopted surnames of solely Spanish origin. Other North African Sephardim have since translated their Spanish surnames into local languages or have modified them to sound local.

=== Western Sephardim ===
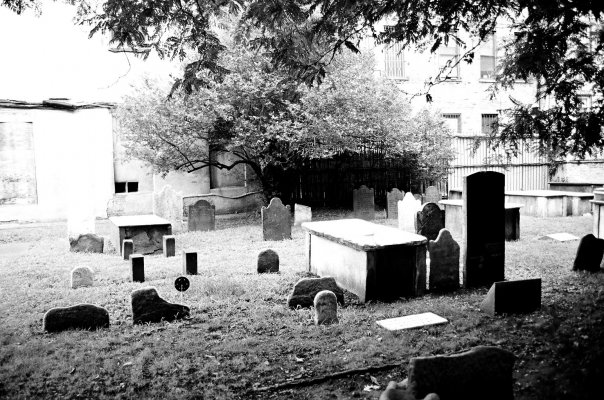
First Cemetery of the Spanish and Portuguese Synagogue, Shearith Israel (1656–1833) in Manhattan, New York City

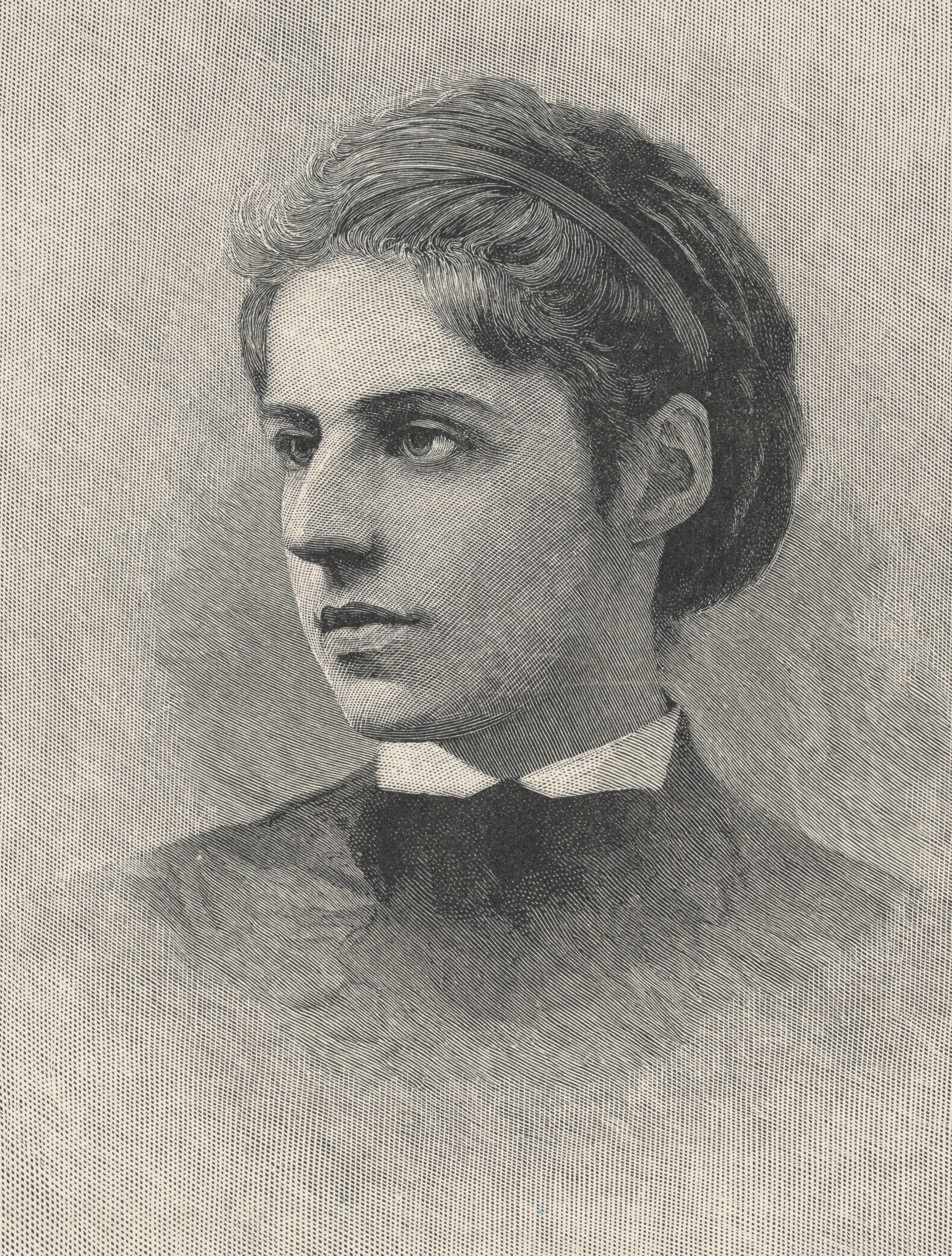
Emma Lazarus, American poet, born into a large New York Sephardi family.

Western Sephardim (also known more ambiguously as "Spanish and Portuguese Jews", "Spanish Jews", "Portuguese Jews" and "Jews of the Portuguese Nation") are the community of Jewish ex-conversos whose families initially remained in Spain and Portugal as ostensible New Christians, that is, as Anusim or "forced [converts]". Western Sephardim are further sub-divided into an Old World branch and a New World branch.

Henry Kamen and Joseph Perez estimate that of the total Jewish origin population of Spain at the time of the issuance of the Alhambra Decree, those who chose to remain in Spain represented the majority, up to 300,000 of a total Jewish origin population of 350,000. Furthermore, a significant number returned to Spain in the years following the expulsion, on condition of converting to Catholicism, the Crown guaranteeing they could recover their property at the same price at which it was sold.

Discrimination against this large community of conversos nevertheless remained, and those who secretly practiced the Jewish faith specifically suffered severe episodes of persecution by the Inquisition. The last such episode of persecution occurred in the mid-18th century. External migrations out of the Iberian peninsula coincided with these episodes of increased persecution by the Inquisition.

As a result of this discrimination and persecution, a small number of marranos (conversos who secretly still practiced Judaism) later emigrated to more religiously tolerant Old World countries outside the Iberian cultural sphere, such as the Netherlands, Belgium, France, Italy, Germany and England. In these lands conversos reverted to Judaism, rejoining the Jewish community sometimes up to the third or even fourth generations after the initial decrees stipulating conversion, expulsion, or death. It is these returnees to Judaism that represent Old World Western Sephardim. Among this branch of Sephardic Jews, the philosopher Baruch de Spinoza was born in a Jewish family of Portuguese origin that settled in Holland. He was also, famously, expelled from the Portuguese community of Amsterdam over his religious and philosophical views.

New World Western Sephardim, on the other hand, are the descendants of those Jewish-origin New Christian conversos who accompanied the millions of Old Christian Spaniards and Portuguese that emigrated to the Americas. More specifically, New World Western Sephardim are those Western Sephardim whose converso ancestors migrated to various of the non-Iberian colonies in the Americas in whose jurisdictions they could return to Judaism.

New World Western Sephardim are juxtaposed to yet another group of descendants of conversos who settled in the Iberian colonies of the Americas who could not revert to Judaism. These form the related but distinct group known as Sephardic Bnei Anusim (see the section below).

Due to the presence of the Spanish and Portuguese Inquisition in the Iberian American territories, initially, converso immigration was barred throughout much of Ibero-America. Because of this, very few converso immigrants in Iberian American colonies ever reverted to Judaism. Of those conversos in the New World who did return to Judaism, it was principally those who had come via an initial respite of refuge in the Netherlands or who were settling the New World Dutch colonies such as Curaçao and the area then known as New Holland, also called Dutch Brazil. Dutch Brazil was the northern portion of the colony of Brazil ruled by the Dutch for under a quarter of a century, before it also fell to the Portuguese armed forces that ruled the remainder of Brazil. Jews who had only recently reverted to Judaism in Dutch Brazil then again had to flee to other Dutch-ruled colonies in the Americas, including joining brethren in Curaçao, but also migrating to New Amsterdam, in what is today Lower Manhattan in New York City.

The oldest congregations in the non-Iberian colonial possessions in the Americas were founded by Western Sephardim, who arrived in the then Dutch-ruled New Amsterdam, with their synagogues being established in the tradition of "Spanish and Portuguese Jews". This is why the Portuguese Synagogue of Amsterdam, referred to as the Esnoga, is considered the "mother synagogue" of all the Western Sephardic temples in the New World.

In the United States in particular, Congregation Shearith Israel, established in 1654 in what is now New York City, is the oldest Jewish congregation in the United States. Its present building dates from 1897. Congregation Jeshuat Israel in Newport, Rhode Island, is dated to sometime after the arrival of Western Sephardim there in 1658 and prior to the 1677 purchase of a communal cemetery, now known as Touro Cemetery. See also List of the oldest synagogues in the United States.

For the ancestors of many Western Sephardim —whether Old World or New World—, the intermittent period of residence in Portugal after the expulsion from Spain, as well as the fear of being singled out as Spaniards in the Dutch rebel provinces, are among the reasons why the Christian surnames of many Sephardic families tend to be Portuguese variations of common Spanish surnames, although some are still Spanish in spelling. Such is the case of the Portuguese variations of some Spanish patronymic surnames, in which the Portuguese -es suffix was substituted for the original Spanish suffix -ez. For instance, "Gomes de Castro" or "Lopes da Costa", whereas the original Spanish family names are written "Gómez" and "López".

Among a few notable figures with roots in Western Sephardim are former Associate Justice of the Supreme Court of the United States, Benjamin N. Cardozo, and the captured president of Venezuela, Nicolás Maduro. Both descend from Western Sephardim who left Portugal for the Netherlands, and in the case of Maduro, from the Netherlands to Curaçao, and ultimately Venezuela.

=== Sephardic Bnei Anusim ===
The Sephardic Bnei Anusim consists of the contemporary and largely nominal Christian descendants of assimilated 15th-century Sephardic anusim. These descendants of Spanish and Portuguese Jews forced or coerced to convert to Catholicism remained, as conversos, in Iberia or moved to the Iberian colonial possessions across various Latin American countries during the Spanish colonization of the Americas.

Due to historical reasons and circumstances, Sephardic Bnei Anusim had not been able to return to the Jewish faith over the last five centuries, although increasing numbers have begun emerging publicly in modern times, especially over the last two decades. Except for varying degrees of putatively rudimentary Jewish customs and traditions which had been retained as family traditions among individual families, Sephardic Bnei Anusim became a fully assimilated sub-group within the Iberian-descended Christian populations of Spain, Portugal, Hispanic America and Brazil. In the last 5 to 10 years, however, "organized groups of [Sephardic] Benei Anusim in Brazil, Colombia, Costa Rica, Chile, Ecuador, Mexico, Puerto Rico, Venezuela, Dominican Republic and in Sefarad [Iberia] itself" have now been established, some of whose members have formally reverted to Judaism, leading to the emergence of Neo-Western Sephardim (see group below).

The Jewish Agency for Israel estimates the Sephardic Bnei Anusim population to number in the millions. Their population size is several times larger than the three Jewish-integrated Sephardi descendant sub-groups combined, consisting of Eastern Sephardim, North African Sephardim, and the ex-converso Western Sephardim (both New World and Old World branches).

Although numerically superior, Sephardic Bnei Anusim is, however, the least prominent or known sub-group of Sephardi descendants. Sephardic Bnei Anusim are also more than twice the size of the total world Jewish population as a whole, which itself also encompasses Ashkenazi Jews, Mizrahi Jews and various other smaller groups.

Unlike the Anusim ("forced [converts]") who were the conversos up to the third, fourth or fifth generation (depending on the Jewish responsa) who later reverted to Judaism, the Bnei Anusim ("[later] sons/children/descendants [of the] forced [converts]") were the subsequent generations of descendants of the Anusim who remained hidden ever since the Inquisition in the Iberian Peninsula and its New World franchises. At least some Sephardic Anusim in the Hispanosphere (in Iberia, but especially in their colonies in Ibero-America) had also initially tried to revert to Judaism, or at least maintain crypto-Jewish practices in privacy. This, however, was not feasible long-term in that environment, as Judaizing conversos in Iberia and Ibero-America remained persecuted, prosecuted, and liable to conviction and execution. The Inquisition itself was only finally formally disbanded in the 19th century.

Historical documentation shedding new light on the diversity in the ethnic composition of the Iberian immigrants to the Spanish colonies of the Americas during the conquest era suggests that the number of New Christians of Sephardi origin that actively participated in the conquest and settlement was more significant than previously estimated. A number of Spanish conquerors, administrators, settlers, have now been confirmed to have been of Sephardi origin. Recent revelations have only come about as a result of modern DNA evidence and newly discovered records in Spain, which had been either lost or hidden, relating to conversions, marriages, baptisms, and Inquisition trials of the parents, grandparents and great-grandparents of the Sephardi-origin Iberian immigrants.

Overall, it is now estimated that up to 20% of modern-day Spaniards and 10% of colonial Latin America's Iberian settlers may have been of Sephardic origin, although the regional distribution of their settlement was uneven throughout the colonies. Thus, Iberian settlers of New Christian Sephardi-origin ranged anywhere from none in most areas to as high as 1 in every 3 (approx. 30%) Iberian settlers in other areas. With Latin America's current population standing at close to 590 million people, the bulk of which consists of persons of full or partial Iberian ancestry (both New World Hispanics and Brazilians, whether they're criollos, mestizos or mulattos), it is estimated that up to 50 million of these possess Sephardic Jewish ancestry to some degree.

In Iberia, settlements of known and attested populations of Bnei Anusim include those in Belmonte, in Portugal, and the Xuetes of Palma de Mallorca, in Spain. In 2011 Rabbi Nissim Karelitz, a leading rabbi and Halachic authority and chairman of the Beit Din Tzedek rabbinical court in Bnei Brak, Israel, recognized the entire Xuete community of Bnei Anusim in Palma de Mallorca, as Jews. That population alone represented approximately 18,000 to 20,000 people, or just over 2% of the entire population of the island. The proclamation of the Jews' default acceptance of Catholicism by the Portuguese king actually resulted in a high percentage being assimilated into the Portuguese population. Besides the Xuetas, the same is true of Spain. Many of their descendants observe a syncretist form of Christian worship known as Xueta Christianity.

Almost all Sephardic Bnei Anusim carry surnames which are known to have been used by Sephardim during the 15th century. However, almost all of these surnames are not specifically Sephardic per se, and most are in fact surnames of gentile Spanish or gentile Portuguese origin which only became common among Bnei Anusim because they deliberately adopted them during their conversions to Catholicism, in an attempt to obscure their Jewish heritage. Given that conversion made New Christians subject to Inquisitorial prosecution as Catholics, crypto-Jews formally recorded Christian names and gentile surnames to be publicly used as their aliases in notarial documents, government relations and commercial activities, while keeping their given Hebrew names and Jewish surnames secret. As a result, very few Sephardic Bnei Anusim carry surnames that are specifically Sephardic in origin, or that are exclusively found among Bnei Anusim.

== Distribution ==
=== Pre-1492 ===
Prior to 1492, substantial Jewish populations existed in most Spanish and Portuguese provinces. Among the larger Jewish populations were the Jewish communities in cities like Lisbon, Toledo, Córdoba, Seville, Málaga, and Granada. In these cities, however, Jews constituted only substantial minorities of the overall population. An exception may have been Medieval Lucena, reputedly home to an entirely Jewish population, and Granada, where Jews may have been the majority; the city was popularly known as Gharnāṭat al-Yahūd—"Granada of the Jews."

In several smaller towns, however, Jews composed majorities or pluralities, as the towns were founded or inhabited principally by Jews. Among these towns were Ocaña, Guadalajara, Buitrago del Lozoya, Lucena, Ribadavia, Hervás, Llerena, and Almazán.

In Castile, Aranda de Duero, Ávila, Alba de Tormes, Arévalo, Burgos, Calahorra, Carrión de los Condes, Cuéllar, Herrera del Duque, León, Medina del Campo, Ourense, Salamanca, Segovia, Soria, and Villalón were home to large Jewish communities or aljamas. Aragon had substantial Jewish communities in the Calls of Girona, Barcelona, Tarragona, Valencia and Palma (Mallorca), with the Girona Synagogue serving as the centre of Catalonian Jewry

The first Jews to leave Spain settled in what is today Algeria after the various persecutions that took place in 1391.

=== Post-1492 ===
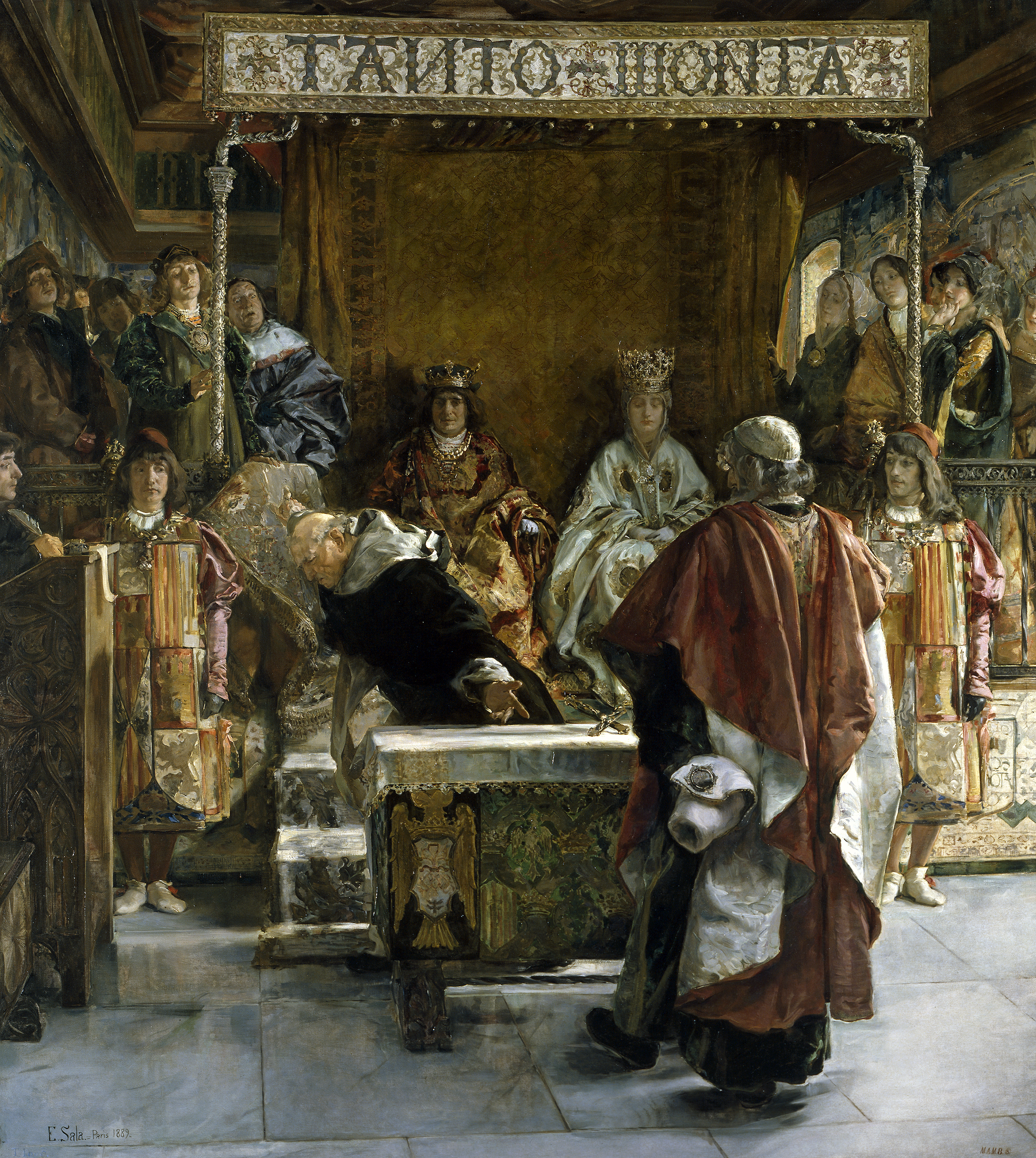
The Expulsion of the Jews from Spain (in the year 1492) by Emilio Sala Francés

The Alhambra Decree (also known as the Edict of Expulsion) was an edict issued on 31 March 1492, by the joint Catholic Monarchs of Spain (Isabella I of Castile and Ferdinand II of Aragon) ordering the expulsion of practicing Jews from the Kingdoms of Castile and Aragon and its territories and possessions by 31 July, of that year. The primary purpose was to eliminate their influence on Spain's large converso population and ensure they did not revert to Judaism. Over half of Spain's Jews had converted as a result of the religious persecution and pogroms which occurred in 1391, and as such were not subject to the Decree or to expulsion. A further number of those remaining chose to avoid expulsion as a result of the edict. As a result of the Alhambra decree and persecution in prior years, over 200,000 Jews converted to Catholicism, and between 40,000 and 100,000 were expelled, an indeterminate number returning to Spain in the years following the expulsion.

The Spanish Jews who chose to leave Spain instead of converting dispersed throughout the region of North Africa known as the Maghreb. In those regions, they often intermingled with the already existing Mizrahi Arabic-speaking communities, becoming the ancestors of the Moroccan, Algerian, Tunisian, and Libyan Jewish communities.

Many Spanish Jews fled to the Ottoman Empire where they had been given refuge. Sultan Bayezid II of the Ottoman Empire, learning about the expulsion of Jews from Spain, dispatched the Ottoman Navy to bring the Jews safely to Ottoman lands, mainly to the cities of Salonika (currently Thessaloniki, now in Greece) and Smyrna (now known in English as İzmir, currently in Turkey). Some believe that Persian Jewry (Iranian Jews), as the only community of Jews living under the Shiites, probably suffered more than any Sephardic community (Persian Jews are not Sephardic in descent). Many of these Jews also settled in other parts of the Balkans ruled by the Ottomans such as the areas that are now Bulgaria, Serbia, and Bosnia.

Throughout history, scholars have given widely differing numbers of Jews expelled from Spain. However, the figure is likely preferred by minimalist scholars to be below the 100,000 Jews - while others suggest larger numbers - who had not yet converted to Christianity by 1492, possibly as low as 40,000 and as high as 200,000 (while Don Isaac Abarbanel stated he led 300,000 Jews out of Spain) dubbed "Megorashim" ("Expelled Ones", in contrast to the local Jews they met whom they called "Toshavim" - "Citizens") in the Hebrew they had spoken. Many went to Portugal, gaining only a few years of respite from persecution. The Jewish community in Portugal (perhaps then some 10% of that country's population) were then declared Christians by Royal decree unless they left.

Such figures exclude the significant number of Jews who returned to Spain due to the hostile reception they received in their countries of refuge, notably Fez. The situation of returnees was legalized with the Ordinance of 10 November 1492 which established that civil and church authorities should be witness to baptism and, in the case that they were baptized before arrival, proof and witnesses of baptism were required. Furthermore, all property could be recovered by returnees at the same price at which it was sold. Returnees are documented as late as 1499. On the other hand, the Provision of the Royal Council of 24 October 1493 set harsh sanctions for those who slandered these New Christians with insulting terms such as tornados.

As a result of the more recent Jewish exodus from Arab lands, many of the Sephardim Tehorim from Western Asia and North Africa relocated to either Israel or France, where they form a significant portion of the Jewish communities today. Other significant communities of Sephardim Tehorim also migrated in more recent times from the Near East to New York City, Argentina, Costa Rica, Mexico, Montreal, Gibraltar, Puerto Rico, Uruguay and Dominican Republic. Because of poverty and turmoil in Latin America, another wave of Sephardic Jews joined other Latin Americans who migrated to the United States, Canada, Spain, and other countries of Europe.

==== Permanence of Sephardim in Spain ====
According to the genetic study "The Genetic Legacy of Religious Diversity and Intolerance: Paternal Lineages of Christians, Jews, and Muslims in the Iberian Peninsula" at the University Pompeu Fabra of Barcelona and the University of Leicester, led by Briton Mark Jobling, Francesc Calafell, and Elena Bosch, published by the American Journal of Human Genetics, genetic markers show that nearly 20% of Spaniards have Sephardic Jewish markers (direct male descent male for Y, equivalent weight for female mitochondria); residents of Catalonia have approximately 6%. This shows that there was historic intermarriage between ethnic Jews and other Spaniards, and essentially, that some Jews remained in Spain. Similarly, the study showed that some 11% of the population has DNA associated with the Moors.

=== Relations with Ashkenazim ===
During the medieval period, a considerable number of Ashkenazi Jews from historic "Ashkenaz" (Germany and France) had moved to study Kabbalah and Torah under the guidance of Sephardic Jewish Rabbis in Iberia. These Ashkenazi Jews who assimilated into the Sephardic society eventually gained the surnames "Ashkenazi" if they came from Germany and "Zarfati" if they came from France.

Sephardi-Ashkenazi relations have at times been strained by racial tension, with both sides claiming the inferiority of the other, based upon such features as physical traits and culture.

In some instances, Sephardi Jews have joined Ashkenazi communities, and have intermarried.

== Language and literature ==
=== Language ===
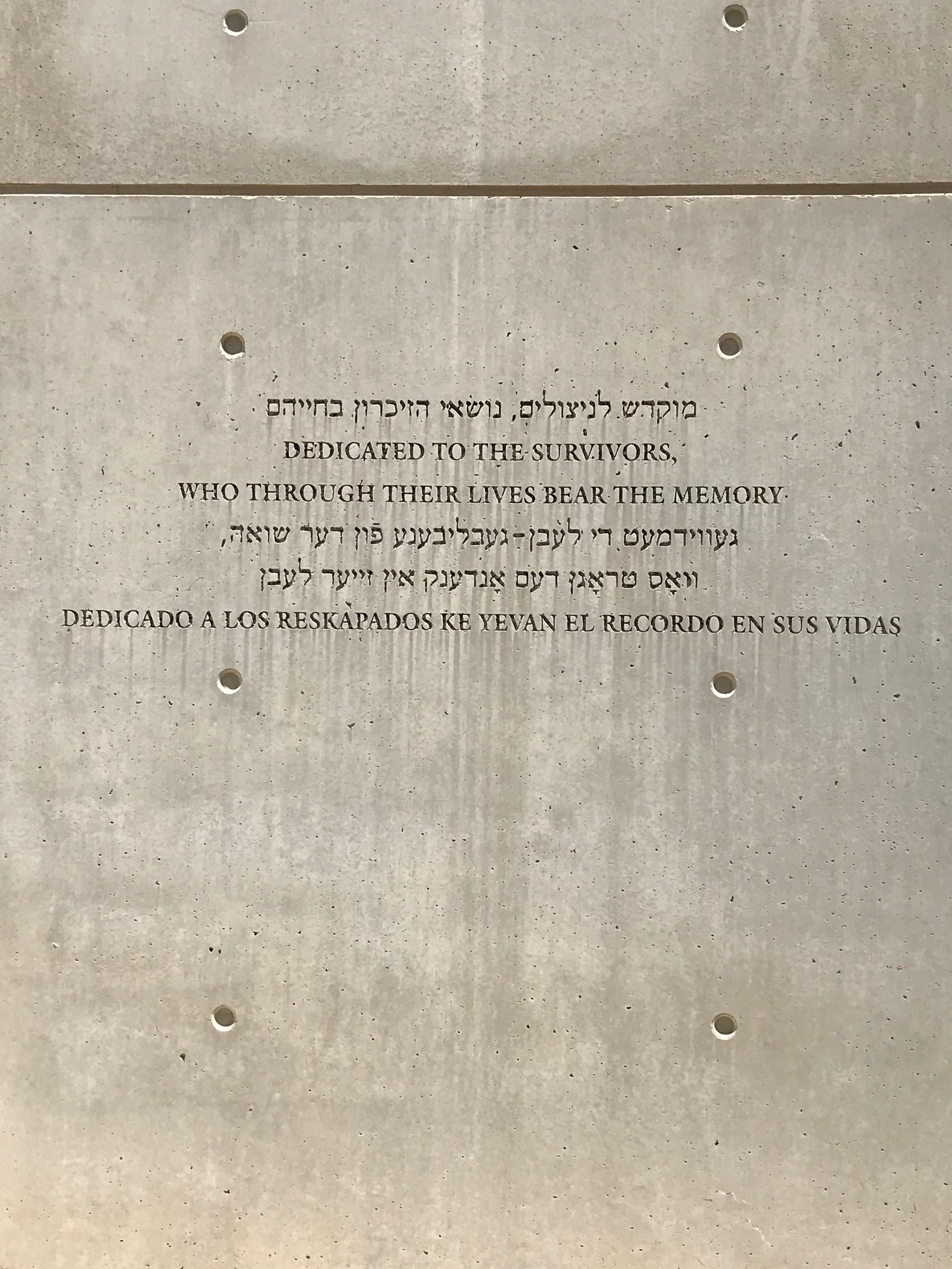
Dedication at Yad Vashem in Jerusalem written in Hebrew, English, Yiddish, and Judeo-Spanish

Sephardic Hebrew is the distinctive variety of Hebrew pronunciation used by the Sephardim.

The most typical traditional language of Sephardim is Judaeo-Spanish, also called Judezmo or Ladino. It is a Romance language derived mainly from Old Spanish, with many borrowings from Turkish, and to a lesser extent from Greek, Arabic, Hebrew, and French. Until recently, two different dialects of Judaeo-Spanish were spoken in the Mediterranean region: Eastern Judeo-Spanish (in various distinctive regional variations) and Western or North African Judaeo-Spanish (also known as Ḥakitía). The latter was once spoken, with little regional distinction, in six towns in Northern Morocco. Because of later emigration, it was also spoken by Sephardim in Ceuta and Melilla (Spanish cities in North Africa), Gibraltar, Casablanca (Morocco), and Oran (Algeria).

The Eastern Sephardic dialect is typified by its greater conservatism, its retention of numerous Old Spanish features in phonology, morphology, and lexicon, and its numerous borrowings from Turkish and, to a lesser extent, also from Greek and South Slavic. Both dialects have (or had) numerous borrowings from Hebrew, especially in religious contexts. But the number of Hebraisms in everyday speech or writing is in no way comparable to that found in Yiddish, the first language for some time among Ashkenazi Jews in Europe.

On the other hand, the North African Sephardic dialect was, until the early 20th century, also highly conservative; its abundant Colloquial Arabic loan words retained most of the Arabic phonemes as functional components of a new, enriched Hispano-Semitic phonological system. During the Spanish colonial occupation of Northern Morocco (1912–1956), Ḥakitía was subjected to pervasive, massive influence from Modern Standard Spanish. Most Moroccan Jews now speak Andalusian Spanish, with only occasional use of the old language as a sign of in-group solidarity. Similarly, American Jews may now use an occasional Yiddishism in colloquial speech. Except for certain younger individuals, who continue to practice Ḥakitía mars a matter of cultural pride, this dialect, probably the most Arabized of the Romance languages aside from medieval Andalusi Romance, has essentially ceased to exist.

By contrast, Eastern Judeo-Spanish has fared somewhat better, especially in Israel, where newspapers, radio broadcasts, and elementary school and university programs strive to keep the language alive. But the old regional variations (i.e. Bosnia, Macedonia, Bulgaria, Romania, Greece, and Turkey for instance) are already either extinct or doomed to extinction. Only time will tell whether Judeo-Spanish koiné, now evolving in Israel—similar to that which developed among Sephardic immigrants to the United States early in the 20th century- will prevail and survive into the next generation.

Judæo-Portuguese was used by Sephardim —especially among the Spanish and Portuguese Jews. The pidgin forms of Portuguese spoken among slaves and their Sephardic owners were an influence in the development of Papiamento and the Creole languages of Suriname. Judaeo-Papiamento, documented in the work of the author May Henriquez, once developed in Curaçao. Judaeo-Papiamento has largely disappeared; very few speakers (mostly elderly) are still aware of its existence.

Judeo-Catalan has also been proposed as the main language used by the Jewish communities in Catalonia, Balearic Isles and Valencia, although its nature or even existence is debated.

Other languages associated with Sephardic Jews are mostly extinct, e. g. Corfiot Italkian, formerly spoken by some Sephardic communities in Italy. Judeo-Arabic and its modern varieties have been important vernaculars for Sephardim who settled in North African kingdoms and Arabic-speaking parts of the Ottoman Empire. Low German (Low Saxon), formerly used as the vernacular by Sephardim around Hamburg and Altona in Northern Germany, is no longer in use as a specifically Jewish vernacular.

Through their diaspora, Sephardim have been a polyglot population, often learning or exchanging words with the language of their host population, most commonly Italian, Arabic languages, modern Greek, Turkish, and Dutch. They were easily integrated with the societies that hosted them. Within the last centuries and, more particularly the 19th and 20th centuries, two languages have become dominant in the Sephardic diaspora: French, introduced first by the Alliance Israélite Universelle, and then by absorption of new immigrants to France after Tunisia, Morocco and Algeria became independent, and Hebrew in the state of Israel.

=== Literature ===
For a long time, the Sephardim took an active part in Spanish literature; they wrote in prose and in rhyme, and were the authors of theological, philosophical, belletristic (aesthetic rather than content-based writing), pedagogic (teaching), and mathematical works. The rabbis, who, in common with all the Sephardim, emphasized a pure and euphonious pronunciation of Hebrew, delivered their sermons in Spanish or in Portuguese. Several of these sermons have appeared in print. Their thirst for knowledge, together with the fact that they associated freely with the outer world, led the Sephardim to establish new educational systems. Wherever they settled, they founded schools that used Spanish as the medium of instruction. Theatre in Constantinople was in Judæo-Spanish since it was forbidden to Muslims.

The doctrine of galut is considered by scholars to be one of the most important concepts in Jewish history, if not the most important. In Jewish literature glut, the Hebrew word for diaspora, invoked common motifs of oppression, martyrdom, and suffering in discussing the collective experience of exile in diaspora that has been uniquely formative in Jewish culture. This literature was shaped for centuries by the expulsions from Spain and Portugal and thus featured prominently in a wide range of medieval Jewish literature from rabbinic writings to profane poetry. Even so, the treatment of glut diverges in Sephardic sources, which scholar David A. Wacks says "occasionally belie the relatively comfortable circumstances of the Jewish community of Sefarad."

== Sephardic surnames and pedigrees ==
Sephardic Jews have a diverse repertoire of surnames, with some originating in the Iberian Peninsula before the 1492 expulsion. Others were adopted afterward, either by Marrano families during forced conversions or by those returning to Judaism in their new centers of migration. Additionally, many Sephardic surnames were created or adapted in the countries where they resettled. Sephardic surnames are generally older than Ashkenazi surnames, as many originated in the Middle Ages, while Ashkenazi surnames were largely adopted in the 18th and 19th centuries due to legal mandates.

Place names are a significant category, with many surnames originating from specific locations in Spain and Portugal. For example, surnames like Algranati, Almanzi, Bejerano, Carvajal, Castro, Leon, Navarro, Robles, Saragoti, Valero and Toledano come from places in Spain, while Portuguese surnames include Almeida, Carvallo, Miranda, and Pieba. Patronymic surnames, derived from a father's name, are also common among Sephardic Jews. These surnames often include prefixes meaning "son of," such as the Hebrew "ben" (already attested in the Bible), the Aramaic "bar" (from the Talmudic/Gaonite eras), and the Arabic "ibn." Initially used as titles connecting father to son, these prefixes eventually evolved into surnames. For example, "Ibn Dana" became Abendana, and "Benelisha" (son of Elisha) transformed into Belish. Another example is the surname Behar, which originated as a Hebrew acronym for "ben kavod rabbi" (son of the honorable rabbi), initially followed by the rabbi's name, but later becoming a family name.

The third type of Sephardic surnames consists of patronymic names borrowed from Christians, which in Jewish usage often became artificial and lost their patronymic function. Examples include Rodriguez, Perez, and Mendez. These were likely chosen by Jews due to its common use in Spanish society, not tied to a specific ancestor. Similarly, Sephardic surnames in North Africa, like Bencassem, Benjamil, and Boukhris, originate from Arabic names commonly used by Muslims, suggesting they were likely borrowed from Muslim neighbors.

Notable Sephardic pedigrees include:

- Abravanel family
- Aboab family
- Alfandari family
- Al-Tarās family
- Astruc family
- Benveniste family
- Bezerra family
- Cansino family
- Carabajal family
- Carasso family
- Carvajal family
- Castellazzo family
- Cicurel family
- Curiel family
- De Castro family
- Espadero family
- Galante family
- Henriques family
- Ibn Tibbon family
- Laguna family
- Lindo family
- Lopes Suasso family
- Mocatta family
- Monsanto family
- Najara family
- Pallache family
- Paredes family
- Sanchez family
- Sassoon family
- Senigaglia family
- Soncino family
- Sosa family
- Taitazak family
- Taroç family
- Vaez family

=== Converso surnames ===
After 1492, many Marranos changed their names to hide their Jewish origins and avoid persecution, adopting professions and even translating such patronyms to local languages like Arabic and even German. It was common to choose the name of the Parish Church where they have been baptized into the Christian faith, such as Santa Cruz or the common name of the word "Messiah" (Savior/Salvador) or adopted the name of their Christian godparents. Dr. Mark Hilton's research demonstrated in IPS DNA testing that the last name of Marranos linked with the location of the local parish was correlated 89.3%

=== First names ===
In contrast to Ashkenazi Jews, who do not name newborn children after living relatives, Sephardic Jews often name their children after the children's grandparents, even if they are still alive. According to Sephardic tradition, the first son is named after the paternal grandfather, and the second son is named after the maternal grandfather. After that, additional children's names are "free", so to speak, meaning that one can choose whatever name, without any more "naming obligations." The only instance in which Sephardic Jews will not name after their own parents is when one of the spouses shares a common first name with a mother/father-in-law (since Jews will not name their children after themselves.) There are times though when the "free" names are used to honor the memory of a deceased relative who died young or childless. These conflicting naming conventions can be troublesome when children are born into mixed Ashkenazic-Sephardic households.

A notable exception to the distinct Ashkenazi and Sephardi naming traditions is found among Dutch Jews, where Ashkenazim have for centuries followed the tradition otherwise attributed to Sephardim. See Chuts.

== Genetics ==
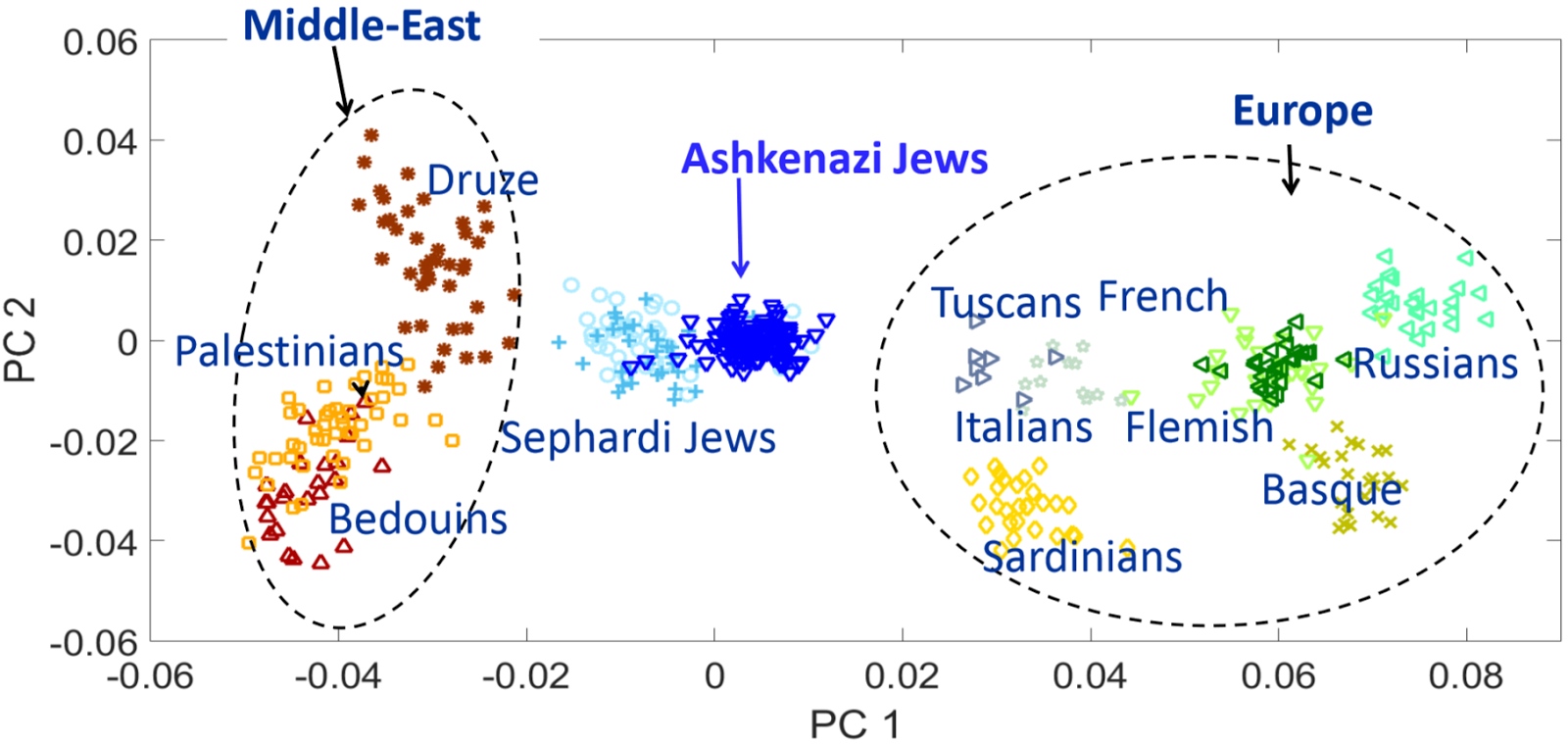
A PCA plot of samples from Ashkenazi and other Jewish populations, as well as HGDP's Middle-Eastern and European populations.

Genetically, Sephardic Jews are closely related to their Ashkenazi Jewish counterparts and studies have revealed that they mainly have a mixed Middle Eastern (Levantine) and Southern European ancestry. Due to their origin in the Mediterranean basin and strict practice of endogamy, there is a higher incidence of certain hereditary diseases and inherited disorders in Sephardi Jews. However, there are no specifically Sephardic genetic diseases, since the diseases in this group are not necessarily common to Sephardic Jews specifically, but are instead common in the particular country of birth, and sometimes among many other Jewish groups generally. The most important ones are:

- Beta-thalassemia
- Familial Mediterranean fever
- Glucose-6-phosphate dehydrogenase deficiency and Gilbert's syndrome
- Glycogen storage disease type III
- Machado-Joseph disease

A 2026 study of 14th-century Catalonian Jews from Tàrrega, Spain found that they possessed Middle Eastern Y-chromosome haplogroups such as J-Y31564, E-CTS9507, and G-PH1944 and that some of their autosomal DNA was of Levantine origin. Tàrrega's Jews also had some evidence of genetic admixture with Europeans. Citing a 2022 study by Brook, the authors observed that these Jews shared many mitochondrial DNA haplogroups with modern Ashkenazi Jews and modern Eastern Sephardic Jews, including K1a1b1a, H1bo, M1a1b1c, and R0a4. Citing a 2022 study by Waldman et al., they mention that K1a1b1a had also been found in multiple Jews in medieval Erfurt, Germany. They also state that in autosomal analyses, Tàrrega's Jews "clustered closely with present-day Ashkenazi Jews and Sephardic Jews from Turkey, as well as with the medieval Ashkenazi individuals from Erfurt (Germany)".

== Prominent Sephardic Jews ==
=== Media, culture and politics ===
- Alain de Botton (1969-), Swiss writer and philosopher
- Neve Campbell (1973-), Canadian film and television actress
- Jacques Derrida (1930-2004), Algerian-born French philosopher
- Benjamin Disraeli (1804-1881), Prime Minister of the United Kingdom
- Eva Green (1980-), French actress and model
- David Guetta (1967-), French DJ
- Bernard-Henri Lévy (1948-), French philosopher
- Eugene Levy (1946-), Canadian actor
- Amedeo Modigliani (1884-1920), Italian painter
- Jacob Levy Moreno (1889-1974), Romanian physician and social scientist
- Jerry Orbach (1935-2004), American actor
- Jerry Seinfeld (1954-), American stand-up comedian
- Peter Sellers (1925-1980), British comedian and actor
- Baruch Spinoza (1632-1677), Dutch philosopher
- Dominique Strauss-Kahn (1949-), French politician, president of the International Monetary Fund
- Len Wein (1948-2017), American comic book writer

=== Nobel laureates ===
- 1906 – Henri Moissan, Chemistry
- 1911 – Tobias Asser, Peace
- 1959 – Emilio G. Segrè, Physics
- 1968 – René Cassin, Peace
- 1969 – Salvador Luria, Medicine
- 1980 – Baruj Benacerraf, Medicine
- 1981 – Elias Canetti, Literature
- 1985 – Franco Modigliani, Economics
- 1997 – Claude Cohen-Tannoudji, Physics
- 2012 – Serge Haroche, Physics
- 2014 – Patrick Modiano, Literature
- 2025 – Philippe Aghion, Economics

=== Prominent rabbis ===
Islamic Iberia

- Isaac Alfasi
- Joseph ibn Migash
- Judah al-Bargeloni
- Solomon ibn Gabirol
- Abraham ibn Ezra
- Moses ibn Ezra
- Yehuda Halevi
- Samuel ibn Naghrela
- Bahya ibn Paquda
- Maimonides
- Isaac ibn Ghiyyat

Christian Iberia

- Nahmanides
- Shlomo ben Aderet
- Yom Tob of Seville (the Ritba)
- Nissim of Gerona
- Asher ben Jehiel (Ashkenazi by birth, became Chief Rabbi of Toledo)
- Jacob ben Asher
- Moses de Leon
- Abraham Senior
- Abraham Saba
- David Abudirham
- Isaac Campanton
- Isaac Aboab I
- Isaac Aboab of Castile
- Don Isaac Abravanel
- Profiat Duran
- Menachem Meiri
- Vidal of Tolosa

After the expulsion

- David ben Solomon ibn Abi Zimra
- Jacob Berab
- Levi ibn Ḥabib
- Yosef Karo
- Yaakov de Castro
- Bezalel Ashkenazi
- Moses ben Jacob Cordovero
- Ḥayim Vital
- Moses Alshech
- Abraham Cohen Pimentel
- Solomon Nissim Algazi
- Yaakov Culi
- Hayim Palaggi
- Chaim Yosef David Azulai
- David Pardo
- Azaria Piccio
- Jacob Rakkah
- Mas'ud Hai Rakkah

Recent Sephardi rabbis

- Israel Abuhatzeira
- Amram Aburbeh
- Shlomo Amar
- Elijah Benamozegh
- David de Sola Pool
- Mordechai Eliyahu
- Shem Tob Gaguine
- Solomon Gaon
- Yosef Hayyim
- Yitzhak Kaduri
- Ovadiah Yosef
- Pinchas Toledano

== See also ==
- Jewish ethnic divisions
- Jewish diaspora
- Jewish history
- Jews of Catalonia
- List of Sephardic Jews
- History of Sephardic Jews in the Pacific Northwest
- Ma'amad, a Council of Elders of Sephardic communities
- Sephardic law and customs
- Gerim

== Bibliography ==
- Argenter, Joan (2013). "Iberian language ecology: notes on history and current situation". In Jahr, Ernst Håkon; Trudgill, Peter; Vandenbussche, Wim (eds.). Language Ecology of the 21st Century: Social Conflicts in their Linguistic Environment. Oslo: Novus Forlag. pp. 137–164.
- Beider, Alexander (2014). "Perspectives of Jewish Onomastics". International Institute for Jewish Geneogology. 8.
- Demsky, Aaron (2010). Pleasant Are Their Names: Jewish Names in the Sephardic Diaspora. Bethesda, Maryland: University Press of Maryland.
- Ferrario, Gabriele; Kozodoy, Maud (2021). "Science and Medicine". In Lieberman, Phillip I. (ed.). Jews in the Medieval Islamic World. The Cambridge History of Judaism. Vol. 5. Cambridge: Cambridge University Press. pp. 825–863. doi:10.1017/9781139048873. ISBN 978-1-139-04887-3.
- Gabba, Emilio (1999). "The Social, Economic and Political history of Palestine 63 BCE–CE 70". In Horbury, William; Davies, W. D.; Sturdy, John (eds.). The Early Roman Period. The Cambridge History of Judaism. Vol. 3. Cambridge: Cambridge University Press. pp. 94–167. doi:10.1017/CHOL9780521243773. ISBN 978-1-139-05366-2.
- Gerber, Jane S. (2021). "The Jews of Muslim Spain". In Lieberman, Phillip I. (ed.). Jews in the Medieval Islamic World. The Cambridge History of Judaism. Vol. 5. Cambridge: Cambridge University Press. pp. 164–198. doi:10.1017/9781139048873. ISBN 978-1-139-04887-3.
- Hacker, Joseph R. (2017). "The Rise of Ottoman Jewry". In Karp, Jonathan; Sutcliffe, Adam (eds.). The Early Modern World, 1500-1815. The Cambridge History of Judaism. Vol. 7. Cambridge: Cambridge University Press. pp. 77–112. doi:10.1017/9781139017169.005. ISBN 978-1-139-01716-9.
- Meyerson, Mark (2018). "The Iberian Peninsula under Christian Rule". In Chazan, Roberts (ed.). The Middle Ages: The Christian World. The Cambridge History of Judaism. Vol. 6. Cambridge: Cambridge University Press. pp. 146–184. doi:10.1017/9781139048880. ISBN 978-0-521-51724-9.
- Ray, Jonathan Stewart (2013). After Expulsion: 1492 and the Making of Sephardic Jewry. New York: New York University Press. pp. 33–34. ISBN 978-0-8147-2911-3.
- Roth, Norman (1995). Conversos, Inquisition, and the Expulsion of the Jews from Spain. Madison, Wisconsin: University of Wisconsin Press. ISBN 0-299-14230-2. OCLC 32132420.
- Roth, Norman, ed. (2003). Medieval Jewish Civilization: An Encyclopedia. Routledge Revivals. Routledge. pp. 380–384. ISBN 978-1-315-16539-4.
- Rottenberg, Dan (1986). Finding Our Fathers: A Guidebook to Jewish Genealogy (Reprint ed.). Genealogical Publishing Co. ISBN 0-8063-1151-7.
- Rutgers, Leonard V.; Bradbury, Scott (2006). "The Diaspora, c. 235–638". In Katz, Steven T. (ed.). The Late Roman-Rabbinic Period. The Cambridge History of Judaism. Vol. 4. Cambridge University Press. ISBN 978-0-521-77248-8.
- Ashtor, Eliyahu, The Jews of Moslem Spain, Vol. 2, Philadelphia: Jewish Publication Society of America (1979)
- Assis, Yom Tov, The Jews of Spain: From Settlement to Expulsion, Jerusalem: Hebrew University of Jerusalem|The Hebrew University of Jerusalem (1988)
- Baer, Yitzhak. A History of the Jews of Christian Spain. 2 vols. Jewish Publication Society of America (1966).
- Benbassa, Esther; Rodrigue, Aron (2000). Sephardi Jewry: A History of the Judeo-Spanish Community, 14th-20th Centuries. University of California Press.
- Bowers, W. P. "Jewish Communities in Spain in the Time of Paul the Apostle" in Journal of Theological Studies Vol. 26 Part 2, October 1975, pp. 395–402
- Carasso, Lucienne. "Growing Up Jewish in Alexandria: The Story of a Sephardic Family's Exodus from Egypt". New York, 2014. ISBN 978-1-5004-4635-2.
- Dan, Joseph, "The Epic of a Millennium: Judeo-Spanish Culture's Confrontation" in Judaism Vol. 41, No. 2, Spring 1992.
- Deshen, Shlomo; Liebman, Charles S.; Shokeid, Moshe, eds. (2017) [1995]. "Part 5. The Sephardic Pattern". Israeli Judaism: The Sociology of Religion in Israel. Studies of Israeli Society, 7 (Reprint ed.). London; New York: Routledge. ISBN 978-1-56000-178-2.
- Gampel, Benjamin R., "Jews, Christians, and Muslims in Medieval Iberia: Convivencia through the Eyes of Sephardic Jews," in Convivencia: Jews, Muslims, and Christians in Medieval Spain, ed. Vivian B. Mann, Thomas F. Glick, and Jerrilynn D. Dodds, New York: George Braziller, Inc. (1992)
- Groh, Arnold A. "Searching for Sephardic History in Berlin", in Semana Sepharad: The Lectures. Studies on Sephardic History, ed. Serels, M. Mitchell, New York: Jacob E. Safra Institute of Sephardic Studies (2001).
- Kaplan, Yosef, An Alternative Path to Modernity: The Sephardi Diaspora in Western Europe. Brill Publishers (2000). ISBN 978-90-04-11742-6
- Katz, Solomon, Monographs of the Mediaeval Academy of America No. 12: The Jews in the Visigothic and Frankish Kingdoms of Spain and Gaul, Cambridge, Massachusetts: The Mediaeval Society of America (1937)
- Kedourie, Elie, editor. Spain and the Jews: The Sephardi Experience 1492 and After. Thames & Hudson (1992).
- Levie, Tirtsah, Poverty and Welfare Among the Portuguese Jews in Early Modern Amsterdam, Liverpool: Liverpool University Press, 2012.
- Raphael, Chaim, The Sephardi Story: A Celebration of Jewish History London: Valentine Mitchell & Co. Ltd. (1991)
- Rauschenbach, Sina, The Sephardic Atlantic. Colonial Histories and Postcolonial Perspectives. New York: Palgrave Macmillan, 2019.
- Rauschenbach, Sina, Sephardim and Ashkenazim. Jewish-Jewish Encounters in History and Literature. Berlin: De Gruyter, 2020 (forthcoming).
- Sarna, Nahum M., "Hebrew and Bible Studies in Medieval Spain" in Sephardi Heritage, Vol. 1 ed. R. D. Barnett, New York: Ktav Publishing House, Inc. (1971)
- Sassoon, Solomon David, "The Spiritual Heritage of the Sephardim," in The Sephardi Heritage, Vol. 1 ed. R. D. Barnett, New York: Ktav Publishing House Inc. (1971)
- Segrè, Emilio (1993). A Mind Always in Motion: the Autobiography of Emilio Segrè. Berkeley, California: University of California Press. ISBN 978-0-520-07627-3. OCLC 25629433. Free Online – UC Press E-Books Collection
- Stein, Gloria Sananes, Marguerite: Journey of a Sephardic Woman, Morgantown, PA : Masthof Press, 1997.
- Stillman, Norman, "Aspects of Jewish Life in Islamic Spain" in Aspects of Jewish Culture in the Middle Ages ed. Paul E. Szarmach, Albany: State University of New York Press (1979)
- Swetschinski, Daniel. Reluctant Cosmopolitans: The Portuguese Jews of Seventeenth-Century Amsterdam. Litmann Library of Jewish Civilization, (2000)
- Wexler, Paul. The Non-Jewish Origins of the Sephardic Jews. Albany: SUNY Press, 1996.
- Zolitor, Jeff, "The Jews of Sepharad" Philadelphia: Congress of Secular Jewish Organizations (CSJO) (1997) ("The Jews of Sepharad" reprinted with permission on CSJO website.)
- "The Kahal Zur Israel Synagogue, Recife, Brazil". Database of Jewish communities. Archived from the original on 24 November 2007. Retrieved 2008-06-28.
- "History of the Jewish community of Recife". Database of Jewish communities. Archived from the original on 2008-01-04. Retrieved 2008-06-28.
- "Synagogue in Brazilian town Recife considered oldest in the Americas". Reuters. 2008-11-12. Archived from the original on 30 May 2012. Retrieved 2008-06-29. Oldest synagogue in Americas draws tourists to Brazil
