= Gueni =

Gueni may refer to:

- Anonychium, a plant of the pea family.
- Guene language, a secret language among the slaves of West Curaçao, which may have influenced Papiamento
