= Judaeo-Portuguese =

Extinct language spoken by Sephardi Jews in Portugal before the 16th century

- Judeu-Português יהודי-פורטוגזית
- Native to: Portugal, Netherlands, Germany (Hamburg), England, Japan, North America, Brazil
- Extinct: estimated early 19th century fewer than 2,000 users in a limited liturgical context
- Language family: Indo-European: Italic; Latino-Faliscan; Latin; Romance; Italo-Western; Western; Ibero-Romance; West Iberian; Galician-Portuguese; Judaeo-Portuguese
- Dialects: Peninsular Judeo-Portuguese; Emigre Judeo-Portuguese
- Writing system: Latin (Portuguese alphabet), Hebrew alphabet Arabic script

Language codes
- ISO 639-3: –
- Glottolog: None

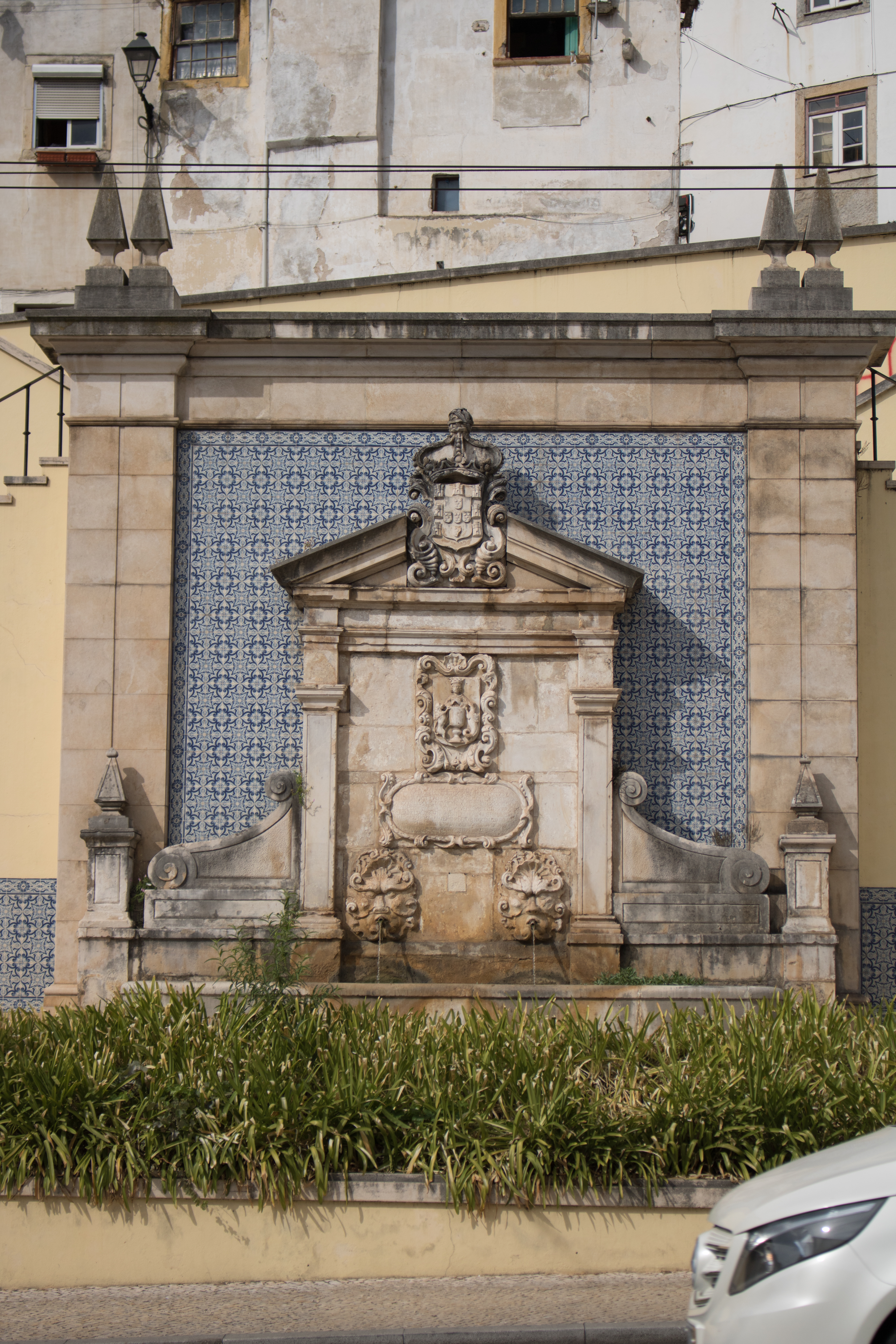
“Fountain of the Jews” in Coimbra, Portugal

Judaeo-Portuguese, Jewish-Portuguese or Judaeo-Lusitanic, is an extinct Jewish language or a dialect of Galician-Portuguese written in the Hebrew alphabet that was used by the Jews of Portugal.

== Description ==
It was the vernacular of Sephardi Jews in Portugal before the 16th century and also in many places of the Portuguese Jewish diaspora. Its texts were written in the Hebrew script (aljamiado português) or the Latin alphabet.

As Portuguese Jews intermarried with other expelled Sephardim, the language influenced the nearby Judeo-Spanish. Close similarity to Standard Portuguese made Judeo-Portuguese go extinct in Portugal, having survived in everyday usage in the diaspora until the late 18th/early 19th century. Judeo-Portuguese influenced the Papiamento and Saramaccan languages.

== History ==
One of the most well-known documents containing Judaeo-Portuguese text is a manuscript about the preparation of inks and dyes and how to use them in the printing of manuscripts called O livro de como se fazem as cores, "The book on how to make colors." It possibly dates to 1262, which would make it the earliest attestation of Judaeo-Portuguese; however, the extant copy dates to later than the 13th century. After the Jewish exodus from Portugal in 1497 many Portuguese Jews would flee to the Dutch Republic and Judeo-Portuguese would intake much Dutch influence. This same exodus would cause the language to spread to the Turkish Jewish community. Portuguese was still used by some Sephardic communities until the 19th century, after which it was replaced in use entirely by Spanish, English and Dutch.

== Literature ==
Besides O livro de como se fazem as cores, several texts in Judaeo-Portuguese are known to exist. The longest one, O libro de maḡika, is 800 pages long and a translation of a 14th-century text believed to be written by an Aragonese court official named João Gil de Casti- ello. Additionally, several texts, including one about medical astrology and a prayer book dating from the 15th century, have been found.

== Decline ==
The decline of Judeo-Portuguese would begin with the introduction of public schooling. Eventually declining to home use before finally only being used liturgically.

== Characteristics ==
There existed several dialects of Judeo-Portuguese divided into 2 categories referred to as Peninsular Judeo-Portuguese and Emigre Judeo-Portuguese, though the differences between them are unclear.

=== Portuguese archaisms ===
Judaeo-Portuguese	Modern Portuguese	English meaning
algũa/אלגומה	alguma	any
angora/אנגורהا	agora	now
dous/דוס	dois	two
hũa/הוא	uma	a, an, one

=== Influences from Hebrew ===
Judeo-Portuguese	Hebrew	English meaning
קדוש/kadoš	קדוש/kadosh	holy
ישיבה/ješiva	ישיבה/yeshiva	Religious School
מַצָּה/macá	מַצָּה/matzah	ritual bread
מִצְוָה/micvá	מִצְוָה/mitzvah	commandments
ראש/roš	ראש/rosh	head
ראשים/rašim	ראשים/rashim	heads
ראש השנה/roš hašaná	ראש השנה/rosh hashanah	Jewish New Year
שבת/šabá	שבת/Shabbat	Saturday
צדקה/cedaká	צדקה/tzedakah	charity
קְהִלָה/kejlá	קְהִלָה/qehila	congregation
קידוש/kiduš	קידוש/kiddush	blessing over the wine
טבה/tevá	טבה/tevah	central platform in the synagogue

=== Influences from Judaeo-Spanish/Ladino ===
Judaeo-Portuguese	Portuguese	Judaeo-Spanish (Ladino)	English meaning
aj	há	ay	there is
Dio	Deus (arch. Deo)	Dio	God
manim	mãos	manos	hands

=== Influences from Greek ===
Judeo-Portuguese	Greek	English meaning
esnoga	συναγωγη/synagogē	synagogue

== Influence on other languages ==
Judeo-Portuguese has influenced several languages. These include Balkan dialects of Ladino, and Portuguese.

== Sample text ==
Judeo Portuguese	Judeo Portuguese (transliterated)	English
או ליברו די מג׳יקה	O Livro De Magica	The Book of Magic
N/A	A todos nossos Irmãos, prezos pela Inquisição	To all our brethren confined by the Inquisition

== See also ==
- History of the Jews in Portugal
- Spanish and Portuguese Jews
- Lusophone
- Lusitanic
- Pallache family
- Judeo-Spanish
- Judaeo-Papiamento
