= Papiamento grammar =

The grammar of Papiamento, a creole language of the Dutch Caribbean

Papiamento grammar is the set of structural rules of the Papiamento language.

Papiamento is a creole language and its grammar shows many traits typical of creoles. These include the use of aspect markers instead of verb tenses, the lack of inversion in questions and the invariability of object, subject and possessive pronouns. However, it also demonstrates features that are untypical of creoles, such as the use of past participles and gerunds as well as a passive voice.

Scholars have long argued over the origin of Papiamento, but recent studies have identified extensive similarities between the grammar of Papiamento and that of Upper Guinea Portuguese creoles, especially Cape Verdean Creole.

== Origin of Papiamento grammar ==
Papiamento is usually described by linguists as an Iberian-based creole language, as it is clear that it is a creole (a language which has developed from a pidgin) of an Ibero-Romance language, but the precise roles which Spanish, Portuguese and other creole languages played in its formation are a subject of debate. For this reason, its grammatical features have been analysed in depth, in hope that they will shed light on the language's origin.

Papiamento had developed on Curuçao by 1740, when it is first mentioned in historical documents, and spread to Aruba in the second half of the 18th century, then to Bonaire in around 1800. The key factor in its creation was the Dutch importation of West African slaves to Curuçao, who acquired, either in West Africa or the Caribbean, a pidginised form of Portuguese or Spanish.

Scholars have long disputed which Afro-Portuguese creole varieties contributed to Papiamento grammar or whether it developed independently as a Spanish creole on Curuçao. The discussion is complicated by the possibility that relexification may have occurred, with an original Afro-Portuguese creole having its vocabulary and, to a certain degree, its grammar, replaced by forms closer to Spanish.

=== Creole contribution to Papiamento grammar ===
Papiamento's grammar displays many features typical of creole languages. For example, it has a near complete absence of inflection of verbs, instead using particles to indicate time and mood of verbs. It also lacks grammatical gender, a common creole feature. In addition, like many other Atlantic creoles, it uses the same particle as the third person plural pronoun and as a plural marker. In Papiamento this marker/pronoun is nan, whereas in Jamaican creole, for example, it is dem.

==== Upper Guinea creoles ====
There are extensive similarities between the grammars of Upper Guinea Creoles, spoken in Guinea-Bissau and Cape Verde, and that of Papiamento.

The system of pronouns in Papiamento, Guinea-Bissau Creole and Santiago Creole are near identical with the exception of the third person plural "they". This leads Bart Jacobs to conclude that all three derive from an early Upper Guinea creole that lacked a third person plural pronoun, with each language filling the gap by borrowing a pronoun from a different source. Cape-Verdean and Guinea-Bissau creoles also share Papiamento's distinction between emphatic and oblique pronouns.

Oblique personal pronouns in Papiamento, Guinea-Bissau Creole and Santiago Cape-Verdean Creole
	Papiamento	Guinea-Bissau Creole	Santiago Cape-Verdean Creole	English
1sg	mi	mi	mi	"I/me"
2sg	bo	bo	bo	"you"
3sg	e-el	el	el	"he/him", "she/ her", "it"
1pl	nos	nos	nos	"we/us"
2pl	boso	bos	nhos	"youse"
3pl	nan	elis	es	"they/them"

The question words in Papiamento also show considerable similarity to those of Upper Guinea creoles.

Question words in Papiamento, Santiago Cape-Verdean Creole and Guinea-Bissau Creole
Papiamento	Santiago Cape-Verdean Creole	Guinea-Bissau Creole	English
ken	ken	kin	"who?"
(na) unda	(na) unde	nunde	"where?"
ki	ki	ki	"who/what?", "she/ her", "it"
ki ora ki dia ki tempu	ki ora ki dia ki tempu	kal ora kal dia kal tempu	"when?"

However, the forms for "why" and "how" do differ between the Upper Guinea creoles and Papiamento, although the archaic Papiamento kum ("how") has a parallel with Guinea-Bissau creole kuma.

Papiamento prepositions, which are unusually varied for a creole language, are identical to those found in the Gulf of Guinea creoles. In addition to this, unlike Spanish creoles, verbs of movement like "go", "come" and "arrive" do not take a preposition in either Papiamento or the Upper Guinea creoles.

Absence of preposition with verbs of movement in Papiamento and Guinea-Bissau Creole
Papiamento: Mi ta bai Aruba.
"I am going to Aruba."
Mi	ta	bai	Aruba
I	progressive marker	go	Aruba
Guinea-Bissau Creole: Mi na bai Portugal.
"I am going to Portugal."
Mi	na	bai	Portugal
I	progressive marker	go	Portugal

In view of these and other grammatical similarities, for example the similarities in time and aspect markers, Bart Jacobs concludes that the grammar of Papiamento is largely based on that of an early form of Cape-Verdean creole, probably from Santiago island. This creole was brought to Curaçao by enslaved people who were trafficked by Portuguese and Dutch slavers in the mid-17th century.

==== Gulf of Guinea creoles ====
The use of nan as a plural marker and a third person pronoun has a parallel in the creole languages of the Gulf of Guinea, rather than those spoken further north in Upper Guinea. Pronouns similar to nan are found in several varieties, with an identical form found in Annobonese. Various authors have noted this similarity, with creolist Phillipe Maurer suggesting it indicates that Gulf of Guinea creoles may be substrata of Papiamento, rather than its direct ancestor. Jacobs argues that nan was likely either borrowed into Papiamento from a Gulf of Guinea creole, or was added to Papiamento directly from a Bantu language.

==== Guene language ====
The Guene language, an extinct creole language or languages spoken on Curuçao and Bonaire, has been suggested to form part of the grammatical and lexical substrata of Papiamento. However, Guene, which may have shared features with both Gulf of Guinea and Upper Guinea creoles, seems to have died out in the 19th century, and the surviving evidence is too fragmentary to be certain of this.

=== Iberian influence on Papiamento grammar ===
Several features in contemporary Papiamento grammar are not found in typical creoles. These include non-finite verb forms (the gerund and the participle), a passive voice and more than three time markers. The origin of some of these untypical features may derive from direct Spanish input into Papiamento during its formation on Curuçao. However, linguist Bart Jacobs suggests that the passive and participle have roots in a proto-Upper Guinea creole.

During the 19th and 20th century, it was common for Papiamento speakers to view their language as a variety of Spanish, due to the degree of mutual intelligibility which exists between the two languages. This was particularly true in written varieties, where writers familiar with Spanish would introduce grammatical features such as gender and number agreement for nouns and adjectives and the use of subjunctive forms into their writing. These features were not part of the grammar of early Papiamento, which closely resembles that of contemporary Papiamento.

== Syntax ==
The cardinal word order of Papiamento is subject, tense-aspect-mood marker, verb, indirect object, direct object, prepositional phrase. This order is typical for creole languages, but differs from Spanish and Portuguese, which do not usually allow the indirect object to directly precede the direct object. This order also holds true when pronouns replace the indirect and direct object.

Cardinal word order in Papiamento
Mi a duna Maria e buki na skol.
"I gave Maria the book at school."
Subject	TAM	verb	Indirect object	Direct Object	Prepositional Phrase
Mi	a	duna	Maria	e buki	na skol
I	past marker	give	Maria	the book	locative preposition school

This obligatory word order does not apply when the tense-aspect-mood marker is lo, indicating future, conditional or unreal events. lo can precede the subject pronoun of the verb.

Comparison of word order with ta and lo
Bo ta hunga futbòl.
"You play football/You are playing football"
Subject	TAM	Verb	Direct object
Bo	ta	hunga	futbòl
You	present marker	play	football
Lo mi hunga futbòl.
"I will play football."
TAM	Subject	Verb	Direct object
Lo	mi	hunga	futbòl
future marker	I	play	football

=== Subjectless clauses ===
In some situations, verbs without subjects are necessary. These include phrases relating to time and weather:

Subjectless clauses
Ta den dia.
"It's daytime."
Subject	TAM	prepositional phrase
[Ø]	ta	den dia
[Ø]	present marker	in day
Tabata kayente.
"It was hot."
Subject	TAM	adjective
[Ø]	tabata	kayente
[Ø]	past imperfective marker	hot

A subjectless verb is also necessary with the existential verb tin (translated in this case as "there is/there are", but literally meaning "have"), and its past form tabatin.

- Tin un hòmber na porta. ("There's a man at the door.")

=== Focus ===
The standard word order of Papiamento can be altered to focus on different elements of the phrase. This can be done in three ways, either by fronting a complement or adverb, fronting a subject or object with ta or fronting and repeating a verb and preceding it with ta.

Fronting strategies in Papiamento
	Non-fronted order	Fronted order
Fronting without ta	Mi ta kome awor (I am eating now).	Awor mi ta kome (I am eating NOW [not some other time]).
Fronting an object noun with ta	Mi a kome keshi (I ate cheese).	Ta keshi mi a kome (I ate CHEESE[not something else]).
Fronting a verb with ta and repetition	Mi a come e keshi (I ate the cheese).	Ta kome mi a kome e keshi (I ATE the cheese [rather than throwing it away]).

=== Passive voice ===
Unlike other Caribbean creole languages, Papiamento has a passive voice (as in the English phrase She was helped by her parents). This is created by using an auxiliary verb, either wòrdu or ser, and a preposition, either dor di or pa.

Passive word order in Papiamento
E mucha aki a wòrdu mordé dor di e kolebra.
"This boy was bitten by the snake."
Article	Noun	Proximal adverb	TAM	Passive auxiliary	Participle	Preposition	Agent noun phrase
e	mucha	aki	a	wòrdu	mordé	dor di	e kolebra
the	boy	here	past marker	passive marker	bitten	through of	the snake
E projekto ta ser entregá pa un ferfdó.
"The project is handed in by a painter."
Article	Noun	TAM	Passive auxiliary	Participle	Preposition	Agent noun phrase	
e	projekto	ta	ser	entregá	pa	un ferfdó	
the	project	present marker	passive marker	handed in	for	a painter	
E kas a wòrdu iferf.
"The house was painted."
Article	Noun	TAM	Passive auxiliary	Participle			
e	kas	a	wòrdu	iferf			
the	house	past marker	passive marker	painted			

Passive phrases can also be created using the verb keda and the participle. However, phrases with keda can only refer to completed actions.

- E trabou keda conclui manera palabra.

"The work was completed as agreed."

=== Negation ===
Negative statements are created by placing no directly before the aspect marker or, in sentences without a marker, the verb.

Negation in Papiamento
No before aspect marker
E kachó no ta kome karni (The dog doesn't eat meat)
No before verb
No tin hopi piská aki (There aren't many fishes here)

Other words can be used in negation; the nouns nada ("nothing"), ningun ("none") and ningun hende ("nobody"), and the adverbs nunka ("never") and ningun kaminda (nowhere). As in Spanish, double negation with nunka and no is possible. However, this differs in that in Papiamento, nunka appears at the start of the phrase, whereas in Spanish nunca must not precede no.

Comparison of word order with double negative in Spanish and Papiamento
Spanish: No fui nunca.
"I never went."
Negative	Verb	adverb		
No	fui	nunca		
Not	"go" 1st psn. sing. past	never		
Papiamento: Nunka mi no a bai.
"I never went."
Adverb	Subject	Negative	TAM	verb
Nunka	mi	no	a	bai
Never	I	not	past marker	go

=== Questions ===
There is no grammatical or syntactic difference between an affirmation and a yes/no question in Papiamento. Instead, the difference is marked by tone, with affirmations displaying downdrift, the tone falling as the phrase progresses, whereas questions do not employ downdrift and, as in English, employ a rising tone on the final syllable of a phrase.

Tone in affirmations and questions in Papiamento
Bo a kome.
"You have eaten."
Syllable	bo	a	ko-	-me
Tone	High	High/Mid	Mid/Low	Low
Bo a kome?
"Have you eaten?"
Syllable	bo	a	ko-	-me
Tone	Mid	Mid	Mid	Rising

Where a question word is present, no change to the typical downdrift pattern found in affirmations occurs. The question word may be preceded by the focus marker ta.

Question words in Papiamento
QW	English translation
ken / kende	who
kiko / ki	what
kon	how
kua / kual	which (as pronoun)
kua / kual / ki	which (as adj)
unda / na unda	where
pa kiko / di kon	why

== Pronouns ==
Papiamento has two sets of personal pronouns, which Jacobs describes as oblique and emphatic, but which Kouwenberg & Murray call dependent and independent.

=== Oblique or dependent personal pronouns ===
The oblique or dependent pronouns can be used as subject, direct object or indirect object of a verb.

Oblique personal pronouns
1sg	mi	"I/me"
2sg	bo	"you"
3sg	e-el	"he/him", "she/ her", "it"
1pl	nos	"we/us"
2pl	boso	"youse"
3pl	nan	"they/them"

There are also several more polite forms of the second person pronoun, where bo can be replaced with a gendered term of respect; for example, mener (< Dutch meneer "mister"), yùfrou (< Dutch juffrouw "madam"), señor(a) and more archaic terms like shon (< Spanish señor/ Portuguese senhor) and mosa (< Portuguese moça "lady"). In general Papiamento, boste (< Spanish vuestra merced "your grace") was an archaic alternative polite 2nd person singular pronoun. However, in Sephardic Papiamento boste was used as a polite 2nd person plural, although this died out after the 1930s.

==== Clitics ====
Clitic pronouns, pronouns which are attached directly to another word rather than being independent phonologically, exist in certain situations in Papiamento.

When e is both the direct and indirect object, as it would be when translating the phrase '"send him it", the pronoun ele is used as a clitic on the verb: mandele.

Prepositions can also form clitics when combined with pronouns in Papiamento. This usually takes the form of removing stress from the pronoun, but it can also result in phonological change to the preposition and/or pronoun. This occurs only with singular nouns and more frequently in the first and second person. An example of this is when ku (with) is combined with e (him/her/it), which gives kuné (with him).

=== Emphatic or independent personal pronouns ===
The emphatic or independent pronouns are used to focus a sentence on the pronoun, to emphasise or to insist. Jacobs uses the term "emphatic pronouns" and states that they are only used to represent nouns which are verbal subjects, whereas Kouwenberg and Murray call them "independent pronouns" and argue they can also be used in the object position.

Emphatic personal pronouns
1sg	ami	"I"
2sg	abo	"you"
3sg	-	-
1pl	**anos**	"we"
2pl	**aboso**	"youse"
3pl	**anan**	"they"

The plural forms (marked in bold on the above table) are used only in Aruba. Kouwenberg and Murray also identify ele, representing the third person singular, as a one of the independent pronouns. Emphatic pronouns are often used alongside an oblique pronoun, duplicating the subject of the verb.

Emphatic pronoun with duplication of subject
**Abo**, bo a kere nan!
"You believed them!"
Emphatic pronoun	Oblique pronoun	Time and Aspect Marker	Verb	Direct Object
abo	bo	a	kere	nan
you!	you	past marker	believe	them

Emphatic pronoun without duplication of subject
**Anos** ta yuda nos amigunan!
"We help our friends!"
Emphatic pronoun	Time and Aspect Marker	Verb	Direct Object	
Emphatic pronoun	Time and Aspect Marker	Verb	object pronoun (possessive)	noun
anos	ta	yuda	nos	amigunan
we!	imperfective marker	help	our	friends

=== Possessive ===
The possessive is created by placing a possessive pronoun before the noun.

Possessive
1sg	mi bukinan	"my books"
2sg	bo bukinan	"your books"
3sg	su bukinan	"their books"
1pl	nos bukinan	"our books"
2pl	boso bukinan	"youse books"
3pl	nan bukinan	"their books"

== Nouns ==
=== Number and definiteness ===
Singular nouns in Papiamento can be preceded by the articles e or un to indicate that they are definite or indefinite, roughly corresponding to English the and a. Plurals are marked with the suffix -nan only in situations where the noun is definite or refers to specific rather than generic objects or people.

- Mi gusta sapatu. ("I like shoes.")
- Mi gusta e sapatunan. ("I like the shoes.")
- Mi gusta bo sapatunan. ("I like your shoes.")

In addition to this, where a number is present, it is not usually necessary to pluralise the noun.

- Mi tin tres pushi. ("I have three cats.")

=== Genitive ===
A genitive relationship can be expressed by using the following structure: e + [noun] + di + [noun] ("the" + [noun] "of" + [noun]).

- E kas di Maria ta dushi (Maria's house is beautiful).

It is also possible to create genitive phrases in the third person by using the possessive pronoun su, in the following way: [noun] + su + [noun]. This structure can be used in singular and plural, but the alternative [noun] + nan + [noun] is also possible where the first noun is plural.

- Maria su kas ta dushi (Maria's house is beautiful).
- Maria i Hose su kas ta dushi (Maria and Hose's house is beautiful).
- Maria i Hose nan kas ta dushi (Maria and Hose's house is beautiful).

=== Suffixes ===
Papiamento has some productive suffixes that allow speakers to convert most verbs to nouns in a regular way.

The suffix -mento transforms a verb into a noun meaning "the act of [verb]ing", so kana means "to walk" and "kanamento" becomes "the act of walking". The suffix -dó transforms the verb into a noun relating to the person who enacts the verb. For example; bringa "to fight" > bringadó "fighter", risibí "to receive" > risibidó "recipient".

== Verbs ==
=== Aspect markers ===
Papiamento uses pre-verbal particles to represent tense, aspect and mood. They are usually directly before of the verbs which are not conjugated in any way.

The following markers are present in Papiamento:

Tense, aspect, mood markers
Marker	Use
ta	present, progressive or simultaneous action
a	past or perfective
tabata or tawata	past, imperfective
lo	future or potential
sa	habitual

==== Ta ====
Ta marks both habitual and progressive aspects in Papiamento, which somewhat overlap with the present simple and present continuous in English.

ta as a habitual and progressive marker
Wan ta bebe tur dia.
"Wan drinks every day"
Subject	TAM	Verb	Adverbial phrase
Wan	ta	bebe	tur dia
Wan (proper noun)	habitual marker	drink	every day
Wan ta bebe awor-akí.
"Wan is drinking right now"
Subject	TAM	Verb	Adverbial phrase
Wan	ta	bebe	awor-akí
Wan (proper noun)	progressive marker	drink	right now

Ta can also indicate a past action that has been perceived through the senses, and which is in progress at a moment in the past (e.g. M’a miré ta kap e palu. "I saw him cutting the tree", El a sinti e logá ta sagudí "He felt the place shaking").

Most phrases in Papiamento require a marker, but some stative verbs representing actions occurring in the present, do not require ta, and others never take it.

Verbs where ta is optional or not used
ta is optional	debe ("to owe") gusta ("to like") costa ("to cost") bal ("to be worth") stima ("to love") merecé ("to deserve") parce ("to look like") nificá ("to signify")
Do not take ta	ta (copula "to be") tin ("to have") por ("to be able to", "may") sa/sabi ("to know information") conocé ("to know a place or person") ke ("to want") mester ("to have to")

Sentence structure of verbs that take ta and verbs which do not take ta
E ke sèntwich.
"He wants sandwiches"
Subject	TAM	Verb	Direct obkect
e	[Ø]	ke	sèntwich
he	no marker	want	sandwich
E ta kome sèntwich.
"He eats sandwiches"
Subject	TAM	Verb	Direct obkect
e	ta	kome	sèntwich
he	habitual marker	eat	sandwich

==== A ====
The most common use of a is to mark the verb as occurring in the past. This usage means it can translate both the English present perfect and past simple:

- Bo a kome keshi.

You have eaten cheese/You ate cheese.

However, it also serves a perfective function, indicating the possible completion of an action not in the past. This can be seen in phrases shown below:

- Fin di aña lo mi bariga a baha.

By the end of the year, my belly will have got smaller.

- M'a Kasi kla.

I'm nearly done.

==== Lo ====
Lo is a marker that indicates future time, future-in-the past, hypothetical situations and conditionals. As mentioned above, it is the only TAM marker that can precede the subject marker, although this is not obligatory.

- Lo mi bai ("I will go").

It can be combined with the TAM markers a, tabata and ta.

- Pa ora bo yega, ya lo mi a come caba ("By the time you arrive, I will already have eaten").
- E kas aki lo tabata costa menos placa dos aña pasa ("This house would have cost less two years ago").
- Lo mi ta trahando ora bo yega ("I will be working when you arrive").

==== Tabata ====
The marker tabata (Curaçao) or tawata (Aruba) is used to describe imperfective situations in the past, notably actions in progress.

- Mi tabata papia ku Wan.

I was talking with Wan.

It contrasts with a which indicates a completed action.

- Mi a papia ku Wan.

I spoke with Wan.

=== Copula ===
The copula in Papiamento is formed with ta, as in the phrases Mi ta un dosente ("I am a teacher") or E ta grandi ("He is big"). There is also an existential copula, tin, which would be translated in English as "there is" or "there are". For example: Tin baliamento ("There is a dance").

When referring to the past "tabata" is used instead of ta or tin.

=== Inflection ===
The use of inflection in Papiamento is very restricted, however, a limited form of morphological inflection is found in the creation of participles and gerunds.

==== Participles ====
Participles in Papiamento are used both as adjectives and to mark verbs in the passive. There are two ways of forming participles; the more common form is applied principally to words of Iberian origin, the less common form is used mostly with words deriving from Dutch.

Participles of polysyllabic verbs originating in Iberian are typically formed by shifting stress to the final syllable. In verbs where the stress is already on the final syllable, the participle is identical to the uninflected verb. This pattern is sometimes also applied to Dutch verbs which end in -a, -e, or -i (the typical endings of Iberian-derived verbs) and can appear, albeit very rarely, in verbs ending in another vowel. Participles of verbs that end in -e can be optionally raised to -í.

Iberian pattern particples
Verb	Participle	Meaning	Etymology
morde ("bite")	mordé or mordí	bitten	Iberian
dividi ("divided")	dividí	divided	Iberian
harka ("rake")	harká	raked	Dutch
pupu ("poo")	pupú	"pooed" (in a passive construction) or "dirtied by excrement" (as an adjective)	Dutch

Verbs of Dutch origin usually become participles through the addition of a prefix. On Aruba, this is typically he- or e- whereas on Curaçao di- or i- are used. A manual of grammar published by the Aruban Department of Education spells the prefix ge-. This pattern can also be applied to verbs of English origin and also one verb of Iberian origin.

Dutch pattern participles
Verb	Participle on Aruba	Participle on Curaçao	Meaning	Etymology
fèrf ("paint")	hefèrf, efèrf	difèrf, ifèrf	painted	Dutch
welder ("solder")	hewelder, ewelder	diwelder, iwelder	soldered	Dutch
tren	hetren, etren	ditren, itren	trained	English
dal	hedal, edal	didal, idal	hit	Iberian

==== Gerunds ====
Papiamento has a gerund formation which is found more commonly in formal language. It is expressed with the suffix -ndo. The gerunds are most commonly formed from Iberian verbs that finish with a vowel, although some exceptions exist.

Some gerunds in Papiamento
Verb	Gerund	Meaning	Etymology
bini ("come")	biniendo	coming	Iberian
sosega ("rest")	sosegando	resting	Iberian
kore ("run")	koriendo	running	Iberian
zuai ("swing")	zuayendo	swinging	Dutch
stofia ("dust")	stofiando	dusting	Dutch
fèrf ("paint")	fèrfando	painting	Dutch

The regular gerund is formed by adding -ndo to verbs that end in -a (stofia > stofiando), -endo to verbs that end in -i (bini > biniendo) and by deleting the final letter of verbs that end in -e and replacing it with -iendo (kore > koriendo). Irregular gerund forms exist, for example: kier ("to want") > keriendo, por ("to be able to") > podiendo, tin ("to have") > teniendo, ta ("to be") > siendo, estando.

The gerund can be used as a participle clause, as in the below sentence:

- E ta kana bai bini papiando den dje més.

"He walks back and forth talking to himself."

It was also becoming increasingly common in the early 21st century to find the gerund used in a progressive construction with ta, which resembles the Spanish present continuous.

- Mi ta papiando.

"I am talking."

== Adjectives ==
In Papiamento, attributive adjectives usually follow the noun. However, adjectives may precede the noun for emphasis. There are also adjectives which change in meaning depending on whether they precede or follow an adjective, for example grandi (big/great):

- Un muhé grandi. (a big/tall woman)
- Un grandi muhé. (a great woman)

=== Pluralised adjectives ===
In a definite noun phrase with an adjective and a plural noun, the plural suffix -nan can be added either to the adjective or the noun.

- E hòmbernan bieu (the old men, -nan on noun)

or

- E hòmber bieunan (the old men, -nan on adjective)

=== Suffix -bel ===
The suffix -bel can be used to create adjectives with words of Iberian origin.

- kura "cure" > kurabel "curable", kontestá "answer">kontestabel "can be answered", fabor "favour"> faborabel "favorable".

This suffix is sometimes used with Dutch verbs that finish in -a, -e or -i, but speakers disagree on whether this is grammatical.

- harka "rake" > harkabel "rakeable", stofia "dust" > stofiabel "dustable".

== Prepositions ==
Unusually for a Caribbean creole, Papiamento makes use of a range of prepositions.

Papiamento simple prepositions
Preposition	Translation
di	"from/of"
ku	"with"
na	general preposition of location
pa	"for/by"
riba	"on/over"
te, ti	"until"
den, denter	"in"
cerca	"near"
contra	"against"
entre	"between"

Complex prepositions, usually containing di as their second element, also exist. These sometimes have contracted forms.

- afó di > foi ("outside"), banda di ("near", "around"), despues di ("after"), dilanti di ("in front of"), tras di > trei ("behind"), bou di ("under"), promé ku ("before")

Prepositions can also be prefixed with pa-, a- or na- so they can be used as adverbs.

- e.g. ariba/pariba "up/upwards", paden/aden "inside", na banda "at the side".

== Conjunction ==
The conjunction ku is used to connect relative clauses.

- Bo mester komprondé ku mi no tin placa.

"You must understand that I don't have money."

Papiamento also uses Spanish pero ("but"), Spanish or Portuguese si ("if") and Dutch òf ("or") to connect clauses. In older Papiamento, Portuguese or Spanish ma ("but") and o ("or") were more common.

Papiamento subordinating conjunctions (in English "how", "when", etc.) take their origin from other parts of speech rather than their equivalent Spanish/Portuguese conjunctions. For example, to coordinate clauses where the time something is done is referenced, the Papiamento word is ora, originating in a Portuguese or Spanish word meaning "hour" rather than in cuando/quando, meaning "when" in those languages.
