= Frank Martinus Arion =

Curaçaoan writer (1936–2015)

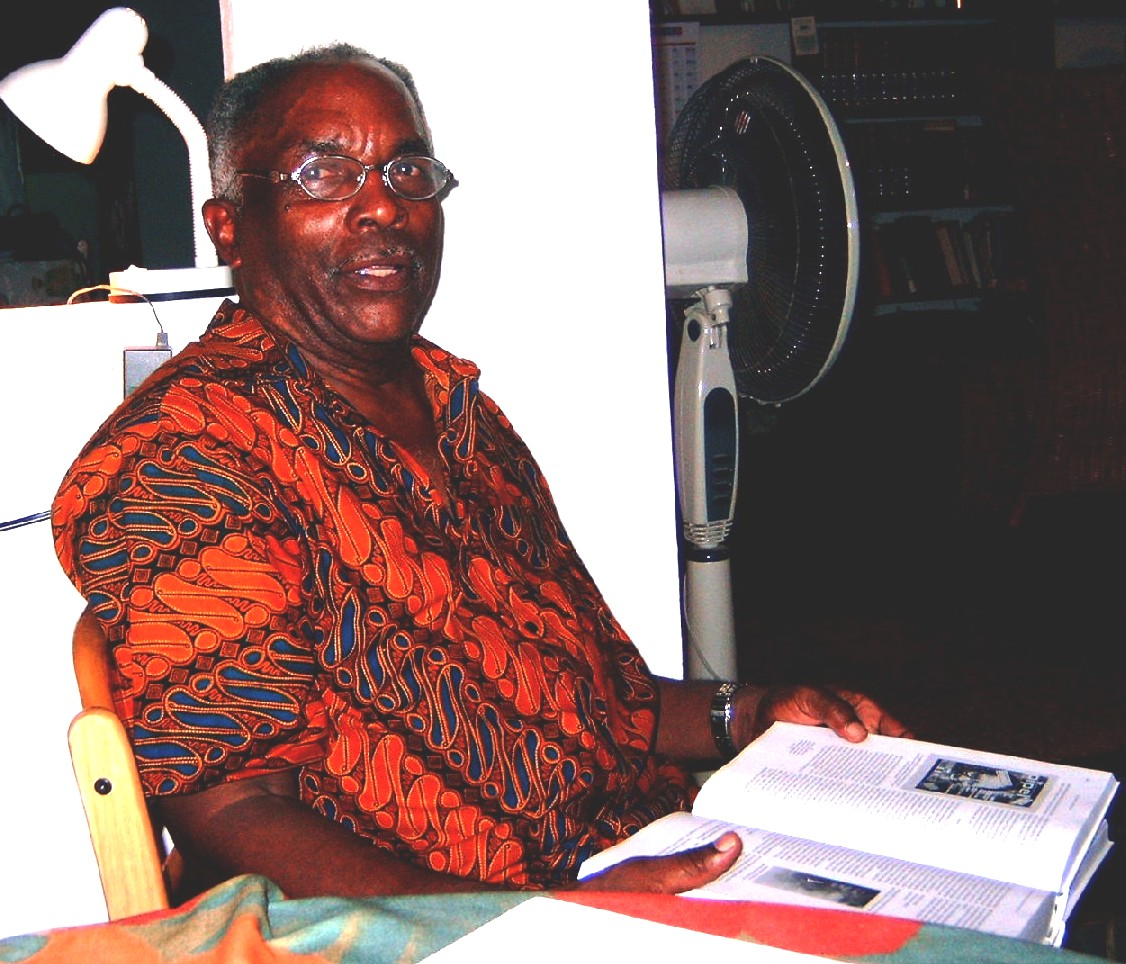
Frank Martinus Arion

Frank Martinus Arion (born Frank Efraim Martinus; 17 December 1936 – 28 September 2015) was a Curaçaoan poet, novelist, and language advocate. He wrote in both Papiamentu and Dutch.

== Early life ==
Frank Efraim Martinus was born on 17 December 1936 in Curaçao, a Caribbean island then under Dutch rule.

== Career ==
Martinus changed his name to Martinus Arion at some point.

He moved to the Netherlands in 1955 and in 1981 returned to Curaçao, where he became head of the Curaçao Language Institute that promotes the use of the Papiamentu language.

His works include The Last Freedom (De laatste vrijheid) and Double Play (Dubbelspel). The latter novel is considered to be his magnum opus and was published in 1973.

Martinus Arion wrote in Papiamentu and Dutch, and published several studies of the Guene language.

== Death ==
Martinus Arion died on 28 September 2015.

== Works ==
- 1957 - Stemmen uit Afrika (gedichten)
- 1972 - Bibliografie van het Papiamentu
- 1973 - Dubbelspel - awarded the Lucy B. and C.W. van der Hoogt Prize (Double Play, translated from Dutch by Paul Vincent; London)
- 1974 - Sisyphiliaans alpinisme tegen miten
- 1975 - Afscheid van de koningin
- 1977 - Albert Helman, de eenzame jager
- 1979 - Nobele wilden
- 1993 - De ibismensmuis
- 1995 - De laatste vrijheid
- 1996 - The Kiss of a Slave
- 2001 - De eeuwige hond
- 2005 - Eén ding is droevig
- 2006 - De deserteurs
- 2006 - Drie romans

== Adaptations ==
Arion's 1973 Dutch-language novel Double Play was adapted into the 2017 English-language film Double Play, directed by Ernest R. Dickerson.
