= Double Play (film) =

2017 film by Ernest Dickerson

- Theatrical release poster
- Directed by: Ernest Dickerson
- Written by: Evan Jones; Alaric Smeets
- Based on: Dubbelspel by Frank Martinus Arion
- Produced by: Lisa Cortes; Gregory Elias; Rose Geddes; Yaron Schwartzman; Volkert Struycken
- Starring: Lennie James
- Cinematography: Patrick Murguia
- Edited by: Stephen Lovejoy
- Music by: Jay Wadley
- Production companies: Cortés Films; Double Play Production
- Distributed by: Paradiso Entertainment
- Release dates: January 27, 2017 (IFFR); May 25, 2017 (Netherlands)
- Running time: 130 minutes
- Country: United States
- Language: English

Double Play is a 2017 American drama film directed by Ernest Dickerson, based on Curaçaoan author Frank Martinus Arion's Dutch-language novel Dubbelspel. The title Double Play refers to a move in dominoes where a player can play a final domino on either end of the snake, earning that team double points.

== Plot ==
Ostrik, now a grown man working as a doctor in the Netherlands, returns to his childhood home on the island of Curaçao and recalls his experiences with his family and neighbors there during a time of colonial unrest in the 1970s. Each Sunday his father Bubu would play dominoes with his friends while discussing a variety of issues as Ostrik would observe. After chasing bus drivers away from an important location for taxi cabs, Bubu becomes the likely choice for president of a newly formed taxi cab union. That Sunday the union meeting for the election is scheduled to be held at his house but the drivers witness Bubu experiencing a day-long losing streak at dominoes and they begin to lose confidence in him until he gives a rousing speech about revolution. Before he has the opportunity to become president, he gets into a fight with the man his wife is sleeping with and loses his life. Ostrik returns years later to confront his father's killer over a game of dominoes.

== Cast ==
- Lennie James as Chamon
- Melanie Liburd as Solema
- La La Anthony as Micha
- Bronson Pinchot as Bob
- Louis Gossett Jr. as Coco
- Colin Salmon as Old Ostrik
- Mustafa Shakir as Manchi
- Isaach De Bankolé as Ernesto
- Barbara Eve Harris as Old Vera
- Alexander Karim as Bubu
- Saycon Sengbloh as Nora
- Dani Dare as Ostrik
- Heather Jocelyn Blair as Bob's Prim Wife

== Production ==
The film is adapted from Curaçaoan author Frank Martinus Arion's Dutch-language novel Dubbelspel. Filming took place on Curaçao.
