= Guene language =

Extinct creole language from Curaçao and Bonaire

Guene
- Gueni
- Pronunciation: ['genɛ] (in Papiamento)
- Native to: Curaçao, Bonaire
- Ethnicity: Afro-Curaçaoans, Afro-Bonaireans
- Extinct: early 20th century
- Language family: Portuguese creole: Afro-Portuguese Creole; Guene

Language codes
- ISO 639-3: –

Location of Bonaire and Curuçao

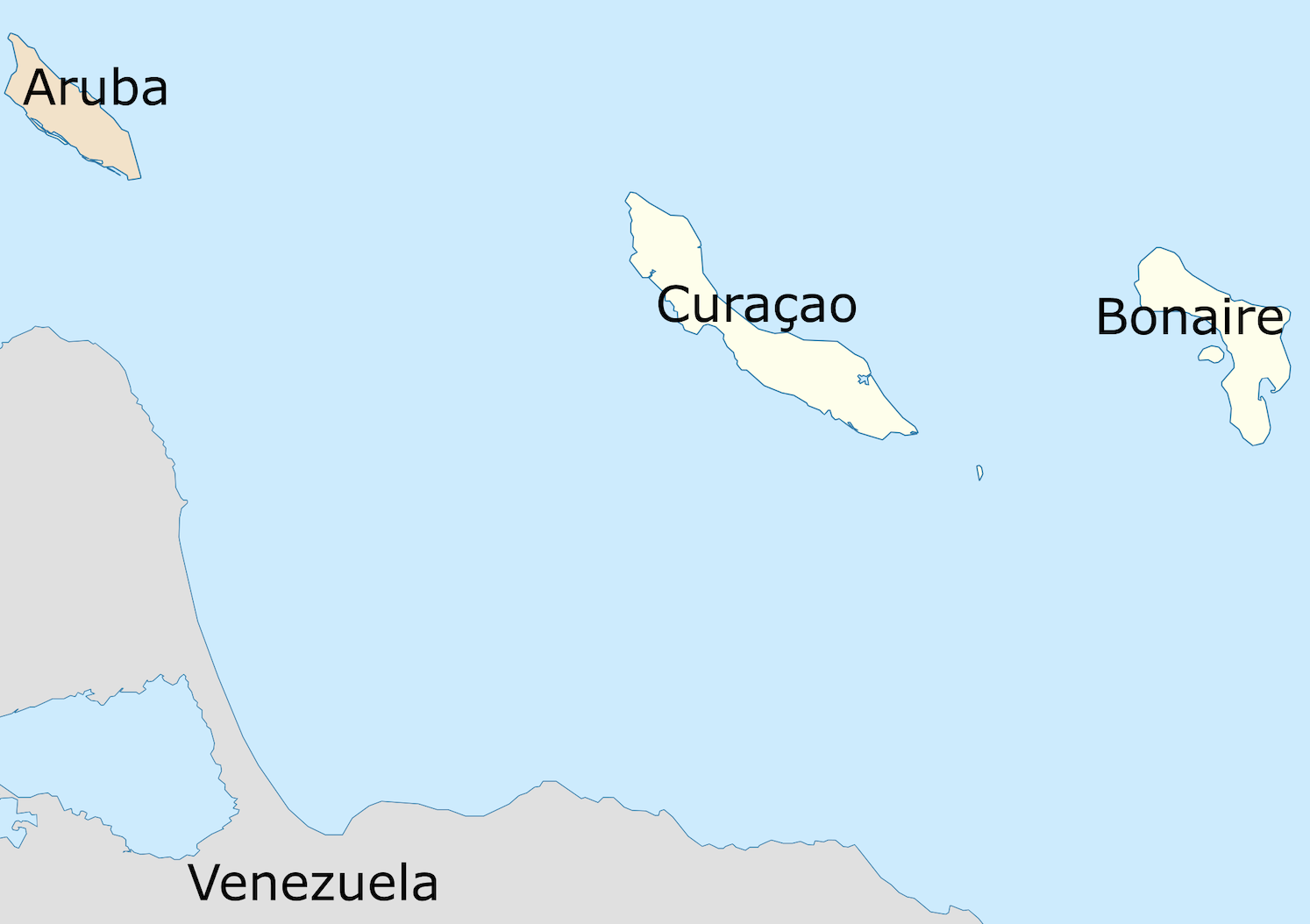
Curaçao and Bonaire, the islands where Guene was spoken

Guene (/ˈɡɛnɛ/) or Gueni is the name used to refer to a Portuguese-based creole language or languages spoken in Curaçao and Bonaire by enslaved afro-curaçaoans and their descendants. By the time it was first studied in the 20th century, Guene was extinct. However, traditional songs in Guene have survived into the modern era, and were recorded by linguists and folklorists from the 1950s onwards.

This fragmentary evidence suggests Guene shares features with other Portuguese-based creoles from Africa, especially Cape Verdean and Guinea-Bissau Creoles. The name of the dialect originates in the Portuguese word for Guinea.

It may have played a role in the development of Papiamento, the modern-day native language of Curaçao, Bonaire and Aruba.

== Name ==
The Papiamento word guene or gueni, which originates in the Portuguese name for the Guinea region of West Africa, has several related meanings in the context of Curaçao and Bonaire. The first is the secret language spoken by enslaved people on Curaçao, which was not understood by slave owners and other free people.

The second is the people who spoke the language. In 20th century folklore, it was believed that in the past the guene had been small in size, very dark-skinned and had magical powers, being able to fly and understand the language of animals. Folklore held that the guene lost their power of flight if they ate salt, and that the Guene-speakers who remained on the island were descendants of guene who had made this mistake.

The third meaning of guene is a collection of songs, rhymes, expressions, puns and words which were handed down in the Afro-Curaçaoan in the Afro-Bonairean communities and are associated with the descendants of guene-speaking people. This corpus is also known in Papiamento as kantá makamba, kantika di makamba or kantika di Luango. Kantá and kantika mean "song", makamba is a Kimbundu word meaning "friends". Luango is a word relating to people recently arrived from Africa, who are reputed to share the powers of the guene, but which sometimes carries the connotation of being foolish or backwards.

== Classification ==
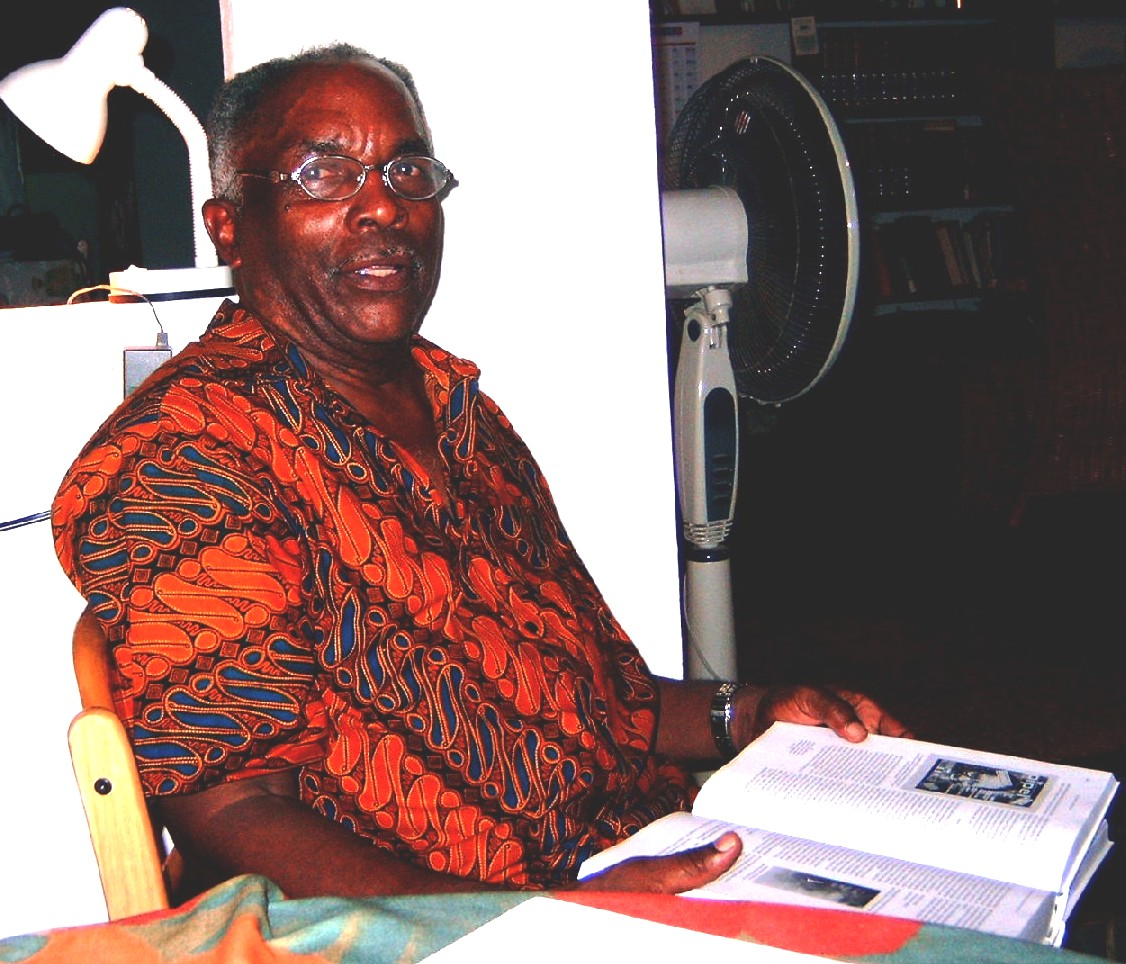
Curaçaoan academic and scholar of Guene Frank Martinus Arion

Frank Martinus Arion analyses Guene as initially consisting of four separate Portuguese creoles spoken by enslaved people on Curaçao. These developed from a Portuguese-lexifier pidgins or creoles spoken on the West-African coast. Martinus identifies items originating from Twi and Kimbundu in the small Guene corpus.

== History ==
=== History of Guene ===
No record of the Guene language existed until the 20th century, many years after it had ceased to exist as a spoken language. However, its history and development are almost certainly linked to the history of Afro-Curaçaoans and their acquisition of an Afro-Portuguese creole during the slave trade. Despite this, linguist Anthony Grant speculates that, given the fragmentary nature of the surviving evidence, it is possible that Guene was actually a distorted memory of Cape-Verdean creole, which could have arrived in Curaçao in the post-slavery period.

==== Pre-Dutch Curaçao ====
Prior to the arrival of Europeans, the island of Curaçao was inhabited by Caiquetio Indians who were speakers of an Arawakan language. Although the island was encountered by Spanish expeditions as early as 1499, Spanish settlement did not begin until 1527. During the Spanish period, which lasted until 1634, African slaves were not imported to Curaçao and Spanish and Caquetio were the languages of the island.

==== The Portuguese slave trade and the development of Afro-Portuguese pidgins and creoles ====
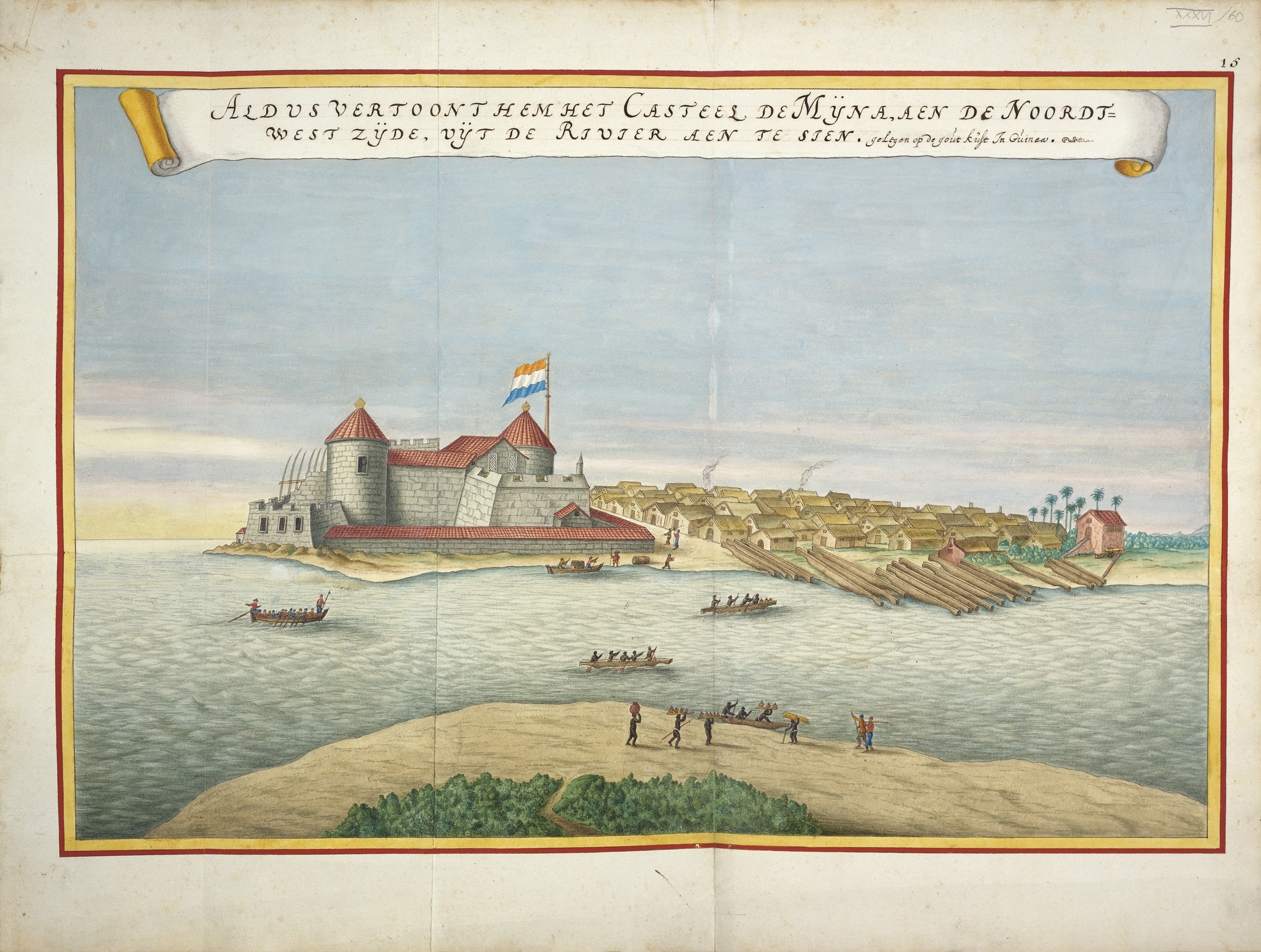
Castle at Elmina, Ghana in the 1660s. The castle was built by the Portuguese, but controlled by the Dutch from 1637 until 1872. A Portuguese pidgin was spoken at the castle which may have contributed to Guene.

During the 15th century, Portuguese mariners gradually explored the west coast of Africa and its offshore islands. As part of this process, the Portuguese set up outposts in locations such as Cape Verde, A Mina (modern day Elmina in Ghana) and Sao Tomé. These depots were nuclei of Portuguese culture, and soon became hubs for the exportation of enslaved Africans to Portugal and Spain. From 1510 onwards, enslaved Africans were transported to the Spanish colonies in the Americas, initially from Spain but later directly from the Portuguese enclaves in Africa.

In the Portuguese settlements, which soon developed into forts, the lançados, Portuguese who settled in Africa and had children with local women, played an important role. A Portuguese pidgin grew up in these outposts, combining Portuguese vocabulary with grammatical features of African languages. Scholars disagree on whether this pidgin was the source of all the Atlantic pidgins and creoles. However, it is certain that children soon began speaking the pidgin as their native language, creating a creole language or languages.

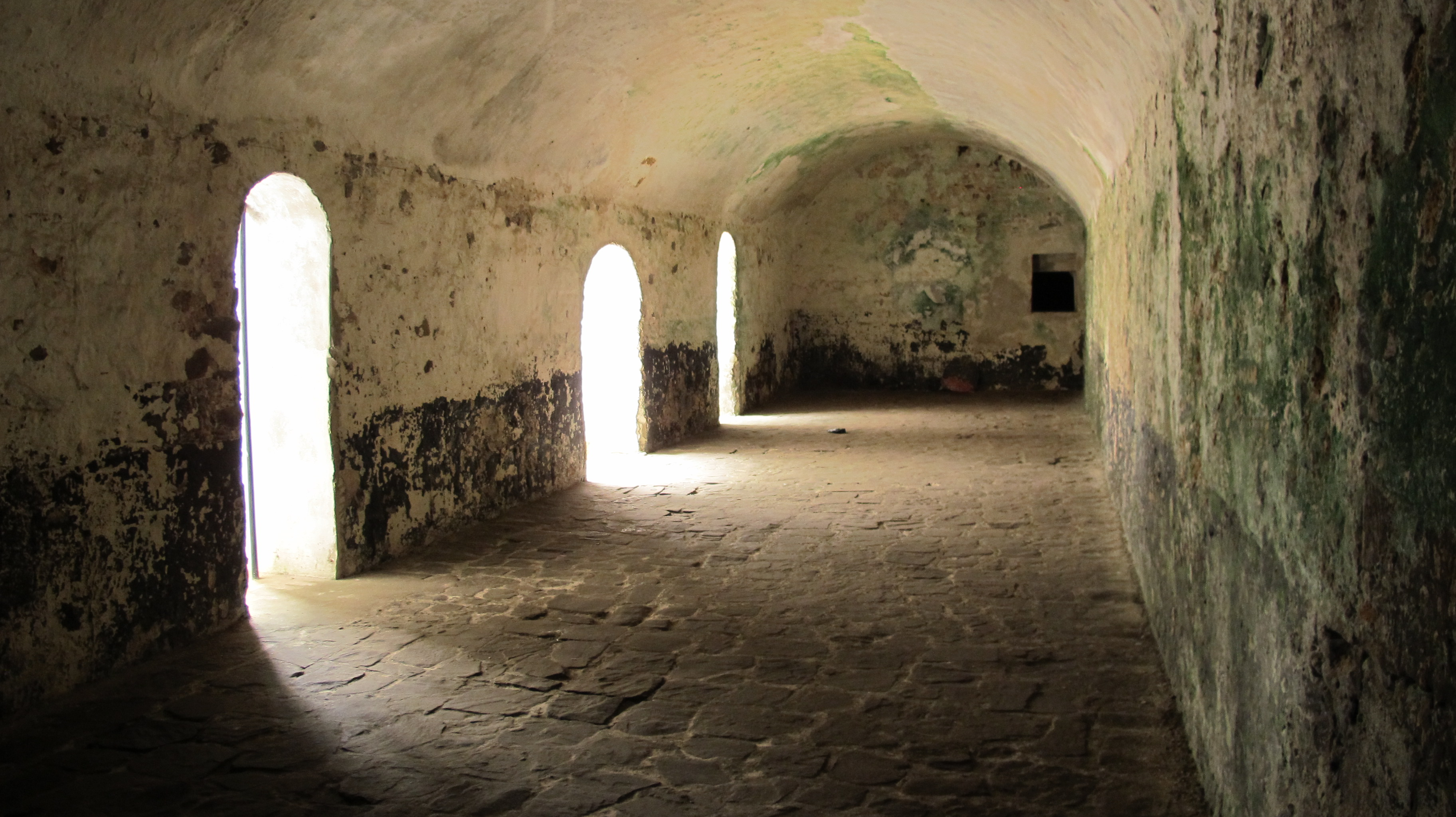
Slave holding cell at Elmina

As early as the 15th century, a Portuguese Creole became the main spoken language in Cape Verde, which had been uninhabited prior to Portuguese colonisation and importation of African slaves, and was soon also a significant dialect in what would become modern day Guinea-Bissau. In the slave entrepôt of Mina in Ghana, African languages rather than creole remained dominant, but a Portuguese pidgin was widely used. Both the Mina pidgin and the Upper Guinea creoles were likely significant influences on Guene.

==== Dutch Curaçao ====
In 1634, the Dutch captured Curaçao from the Spanish and expelled all of the island's inhabitants except for 75 Caquetio people. Following the 1648 peace treaty between Spain and The Netherlands, Curaçao became a depot for the importation of enslaved Africans. Due to the island's arid climate, it was unsuitable for large scale plantation agriculture, and the majority of imported slaves were sold on to Spanish colonies in the West Indies and on the Caribbean coast of America. Nevertheless, a large enslaved population grew up in Curaçao, and enslaved Africans were also exported from the island to work in the salt pans of Bonaire. It is likely that the majority of these forced African immigrants spoke an Afro-Portuguese creole or pidgin as a first or second language. Guene most likely developed from these pidgins and creoles.

The arrival of the Dutch allowed Portuguese-speaking Sephardic Jews, descended from Jews expelled from Portugal and Spain, to migrate to Curaçao. Many prominent Dutch slave traders were of Sephardic origin, and many Jewish families arrived in Curaçao when they were expelled from the short-lived Dutch colony at Recife by the Portuguese. The Sephardic immigrants from Brazil brought with them enslaved people alongside non-Jewish dependents, and the Creole speech of these groups may have influenced the development of Guene. The importation of enslaved people to Curaçao ceased in 1788, by which time the island's main language was Papiamento, another creole with some Portuguese influence.

Oral history collected in the 20th century suggests that Guene had been used and maintained as a secret language, in order to allow the enslaved to converse without slave owners understanding. The descendants of Guene speakers state that use of the language was banned by plantation owners for this reason. This use of Guene as a cryptolect continued during the 19th century, even after the abolition of slavery in 1863.

==== Extinction and recording ====
Guene was spoken as a community language or at least as a cryptolect well into the 19th century. However, there is no evidence of a community of fluent Guene speakers surviving into the early 20th century, though some individual speakers may have remained.

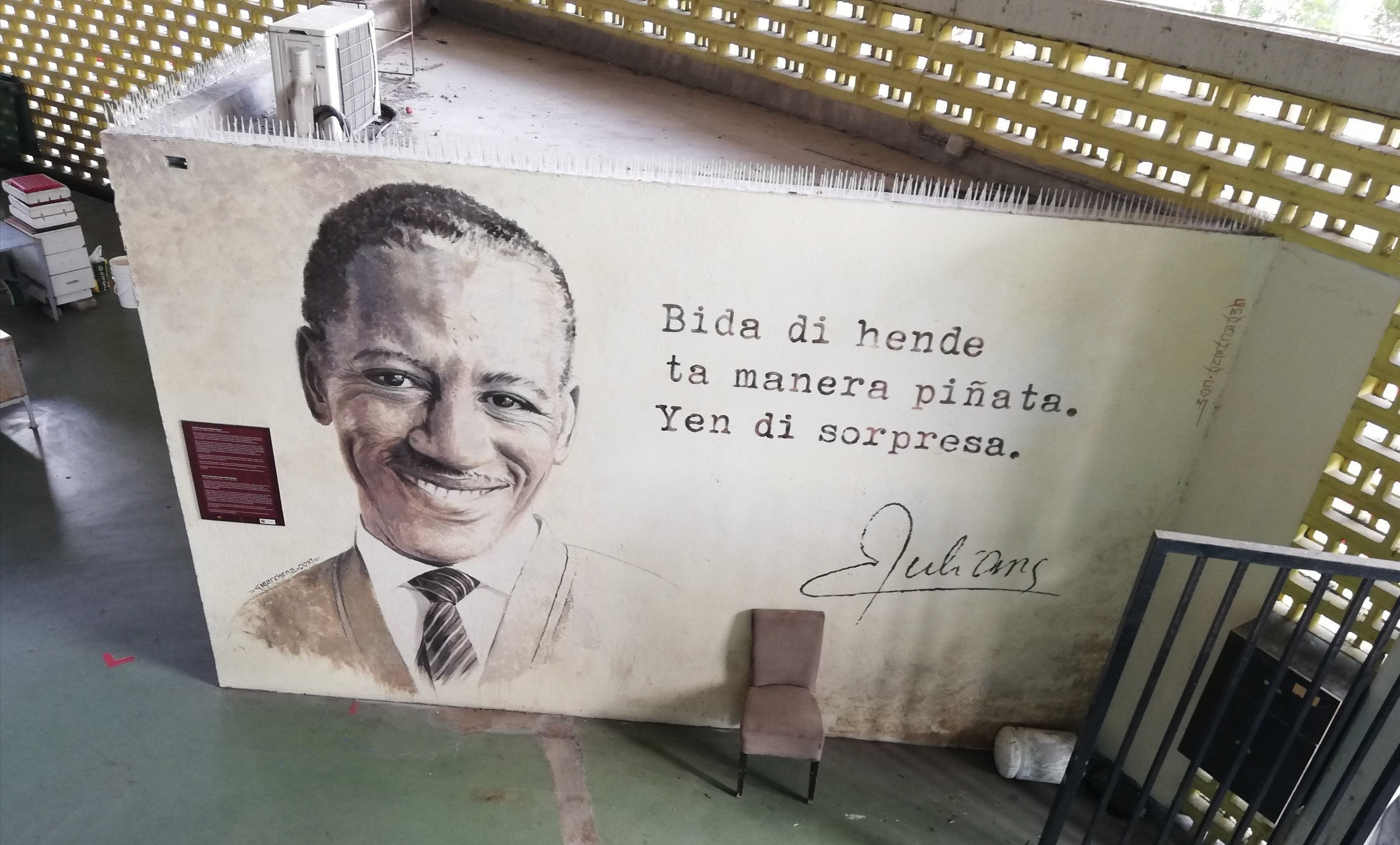
Mural of Elis Juliana, Curaçaoan artist and scholar who, in collaboration with Paul Brenekker, collected much of the existing material in Guene.

Despite the death of Guene, Elis Juliana and Paul Brenneker collected a body of songs, sayings and folklore, either in Guene or containing Guene phrases, during the 1960s. Some of their informants still had some understanding of some of the material. The collected folkloric material, in both Papiamento and Guene, are housed in the Zikinzá foundation in Willemstad, and were published in a series of books by Brenneker entitled Sambumbu. These archives allowed linguistic studies of the language by Curaçaoan academic Frank Martinus.

According to academic Richenel Ansano, Guene song-master Martili Pieters (1901–2000) is the only direct informant on the language to state they personally knew a fluent Guene-speaker. One of Pieters' song teachers spoke Guene with his elderly mother who would not, or could not, speak Papiamento. Accounts of people still alive in the 1980s attest that, around the 1920s, Afro-Curaçaoans sang work songs in Guene, which the singers understood but which were incomprehensible to their Papiamento-speaking bosses. According to the accounts, these workers valued the cryptic nature of Guene. Pieters was still composing songs using Guene vocabulary in the 1950s.

Folk songs in Guene, often versions of those collected by Brenneker in the 1960s, were still being sung in the early 21st century. However, Rose Mary Allen stated that those singing the songs were unable to translate them into Papiamento.

=== Relationship of Guene to Papiamento ===
Papiamento is another creole language which developed on the islands Curuçao, Bonaire and Aruba. As Guene was spoken on the two former islands, its role in the evolution of Papiamento has been a source of speculation for linguists.

Theories on the origin of Papiamento vary, with some scholars believing it to be derived from a Spanish-based pidgin or creole similar to Palenquero, while others suggest it originated in the Portuguese-speaking Sephardic Jewish population that migrated to Curaçao from Brazil. Another theory, based on the grammatical similarity between Papiamento and the Upper Guinea Creole languages, is that Papiamento is a Portuguese creole which has been relexified with Spanish vocabulary.

Papiamento is usually described as an "Iberian-based creole" as most of its vocabulary is derived from Ibero-Romance languages, specifically Spanish or Portuguese. This Ibero-Romance element shows a mixed origin, with the majority of words coming from Spanish but a minority of Portuguese origin. However, due to the similarity netween Spanish and Portuguese, which of them provided a given word is often difficult to say. In addition, some words are clearly Ibero-Romance but in forms which do not correspond exactly to either language, even when the phonetic changes necessary to transform a Spanish or Portuguese word into Papiamento are taken into consideration.

Ibero-Romance words in Papiamento dissimilar from both Spanish and Portuguese
Papiamento	Spanish	Portuguese	notes
landa (to swim)	nadar	nadar	landa means swim in Annobonese Creole
solo (sun)	sol	sol	Attributed by Jacobs to possible influence from Gulf of Guinea Portuguese Creoles.
wowo (eye)	ojo	olho	
haña (to find)	hallar	achar	
hariña (flour)	harina	farinha	

Guene may represent a survival of the Portuguese creoles that provided the grammatical structure of Papiamento. In effect, this would make Guene Papiamento's unhispanicised sister language. Alternatively, Guene may be genetically unrelated to Papiamento, but the source of some of its Portuguese vocabulary, and especially the unusual vocabulary that does not match either Spanish or Portuguese. It could also be the case that Guene is peripheral to Papiamento, having no special relationship to it and little effect on its development. This view is supported by the fact that most of Papiamento's African vocabulary comes from the Gbe languages, whereas none of the Guene texts show any influence from areas where those languages are spoken.

== Geographic distribution ==
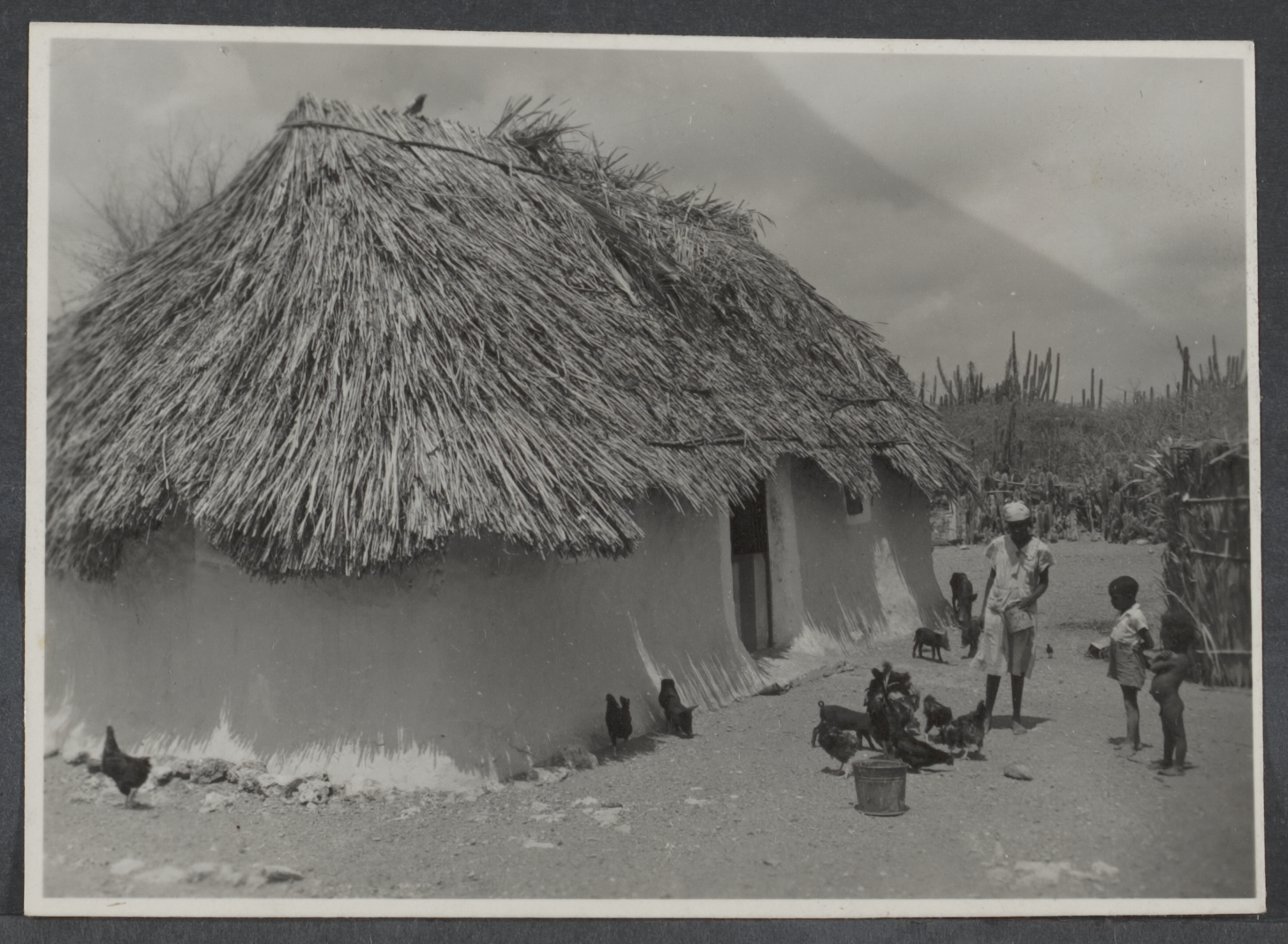
Lagun village, one of the locations where Guene was spoken.

Guene was spoken in the Papiamento-speaking islands of Curaçao and Bonaire, part of the Dutch-governed ABC islands. It was particularly associated with four plantations on the western side of Curaçao. The language was not spoken on Aruba, which had a much lower population of African origin.

== Varieties ==
Historian Paul Hartog wrote that there were four varieties, each associated with a different plantation on the west of the Curuçao; Knip, Savonet, Lagun and Portomari.

Based on Brenneker's collection of Guene songs, Martinus identifies five separate varieties of Guene with influences from different regions of Africa. The varieties identified by Martinus are based respectively on Cape Verdean Creole, Guinea-Bissau Creole, the pidgin or creole of Elmina in Ghana and an Angolan/Congolese variety. He also suggests the existence of a mixed variety.

== Phonology ==
By the time Guene material was collected from very elderly Papiamento-speakers, the language only existed as a body of folk songs and poetry. As such, it may be that the phonology recorded does not match that of the language (or languages) as spoken by native speakers.

However, the collected material does show evidence of lamdacism, where words which contain /r/ in Portuguese, Spanish and Papiamento are produced with /l/ in Guene. This feature is also found Bozal Spanish, an extinct Spanish Creole used in colonial Latin America.

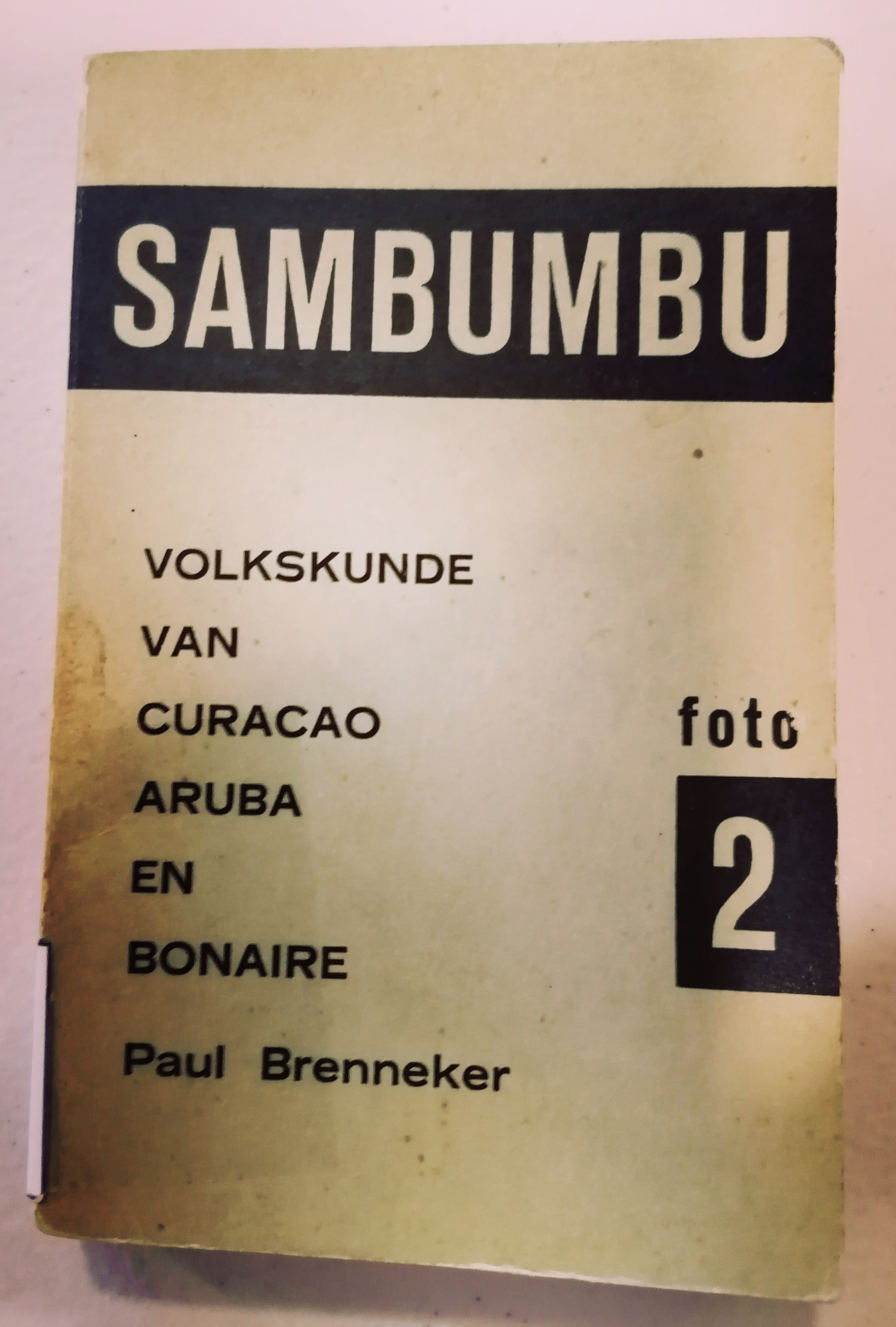
Sambumbu: A collection of folklore from the ABC islands written by Paul Brenneker. The nine-volume collection contains material in Guene.

== Grammar ==
The fact no native speakers of Guene existed by the time scholars had begun to study it means that it is difficult to arrive at any firm conclusions on its grammar. One reviewer characterised the extant material in Guene as "isolated words cropping up in what is otherwise standard Papiamentu". However, Martinus identifies some grammatical features in his study of the songs recorded by Brenneker and Juliana.

=== Negation ===
Martinus identifies the negation particle ka, also found in Cape-Verdean creole, in songs from the Cape Verdean-influenced variety. Songs influenced by the Elmina variety also use non for negation.

=== Nouns ===
The Guene corpus frequently marks plurals with the suffix -ina or -ini. Martinus suggests this feature has its origin in the Elmina variety, and is the origin of the Papiamento plural marker nan.

Plural marking in Guene
Singular	Plural
djamante ("diamond", attested in Papiamento)	djamantina ("diamonds")
geli ("loved one")	gelina ("loved ones")
uevi ("egg", attested in various Portuguese pidgins and creoles)	wevini ("eggs")

=== Verbs and aspect markers ===
When the verb appears with neither a subject nor an aspect marker, Martinus analyses it as the imperative.

Imperative
chucha djorowe "Sip syrup!"
chucha	djorowe
IMP sip	syrup
Kaya bati "Hit the street!"
kaya	bati
street	IMP hit

In some Guene songs, ta is used as an aspect marker. Papiamento and Cape Verdean creole also use ta in this way.

Aspect marker ta
zera ta tira un sueltu mortal "The bonito makes a deadly jump."
zera	ta	tira	sueltu	mortal
bonito	present ASP	throw	jump/destiny	deadly
Papiamento: "Bonito ta hasi un salto mortal."

The particle a prior to a verb denotes a perfective aspect. This is also the case in Papiamento.

Perfective marker a
m’a domele "I have tamed her"
m'	a	dom	ele
1st person singular pronoun	Perfective ASP	tame	CLITIC 3rd person singular pronoun
Papiamento: "Mi a domin'é"

Other texts suggest that Guene may have used zero-marking for past events, meaning there is no grammatical difference between past and present statements.

=== Adverbs ===
The intensifying adverb kankan is used in the Guene corpus to indicate something has been done rigorously or completely. This word is also found in Papiamento and Sranan Creole from Suriname.

== Vocabulary/Lexis ==
The recorded vocabulary of Guene is principally Portuguese, but shows influence from African languages and Dutch.

=== Portuguese vocabulary ===
Guene contains a higher proportion of identifiably Portuguese vocabulary than the strongly Spanish-influenced Papiamento. Its vocabulary includes many items of Portuguese origin not found in Papiamento. This vocabulary most likely passed into Guene indirectly, through Portuguese creoles used in Africa.

Examples of Portuguese lexis in Guene
Guene	Meaning	Portuguese etymon
kamisera	shirtmaker	camiseira ("shirtmaker")
chincha	titbit	chicha ("titbit"/"small thing")
chucha	sip	chuchar (to suck)
zòme/zome/djome	man	os homens (the men)
wedje	beautiful	beijo ("kiss"). Martinus argues Portuguese /b/ > /w/ in Guene
djorowe	syrup	Xarope, from earlier Xarob. Martinus again argues /b/ > /w/

=== African vocabulary ===
Martinus identifies vocabulary originating in West African languages Twi and Kimbundu.

African borrowings in Guene according to Martinus
Guene	Meaning	Etymon
koko	hen	From Twi koko ("hen")
gobina	containers	From Twi gobi
makamba	alternative name for Guene songs	from Kimbundu makamba ("friends")
mundu	people	From Kimbundu muntu (people)

== Examples ==
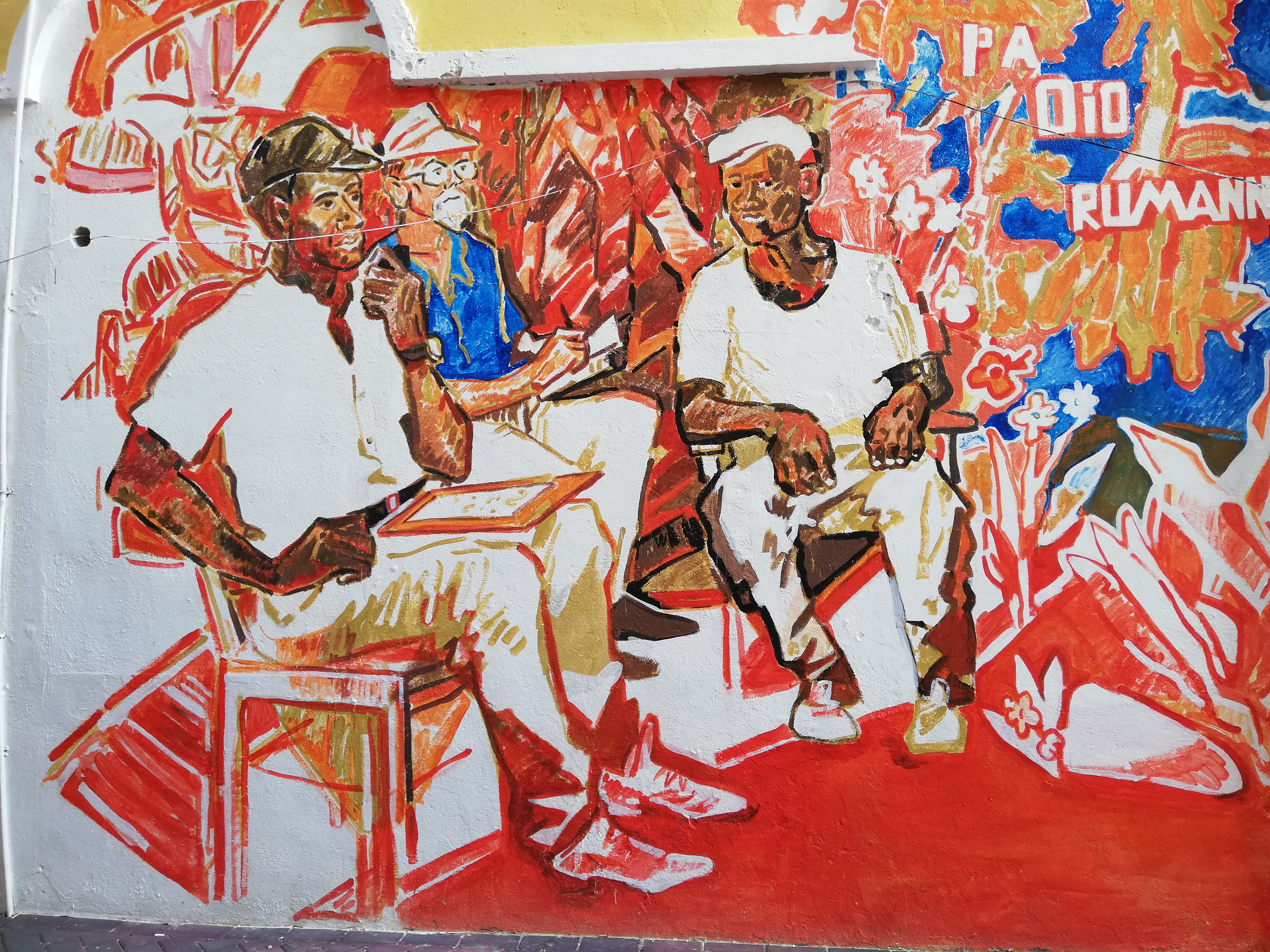
Mural by Lena Davidovich depicting Father Paul Brenneker (centre). Brenneker was a Catholic priest, anthropologist and artist who collected much of the extant material in Guene from elderly Afro-Curaçaoans, often in collaboration with Elis Juliana

The following are examples of Guene poems and songs.

Kaiman djuku: Famous Guene chant
Guene	Reconstructed Cape Verdean original	English translation
kaiman djuku, djuku kaiman	*ka e mas djugo, djugo ka e mas	Slavery is no more, no more is slavery

The above chant is not comprehensible in Papiamento, although Martinus ventured an interpretation of what it might have originally meant in a Guene dialect similar to Cape Verdean Creole. However, the following Guene song generally follows Papiamento grammar and is only obscure because certain individual words (in bold) do not exist in Papiamento.

Song T1223 from Brenneker's Zizinka collection
Guene text	Papiamento translation	English translation
Kaya bati **kamisera** pa **chincha** n kome lomb’i zera ku **chincha** kome lomb'i **zera** **zera** ta tira un **sueltu** mortal	Kaya bati trahadó di kamisa pa algu pa mi kome lomba di bonito si mi come un tiki lomba di bonito e bonito ta hasi un salto mortal	Go out shirtmaker for something for me to eat the back of a bonito if I eat a bit the back of a bonito The bonito makes a deadly jump
