= Judaeo-Papiamento =

Ethnolect of Papiamento spoken in Curaçao

- Native to: Curaçao
- Native speakers: "very few" (2021)
- Language family: Portuguese-based creole languages: Afro-Portuguese; Upper Guinea Creole; Papiamento; Judaeo-Papiamento
- Writing system: Latin (Papiamento orthography)

Language codes
- ISO 639-3: –
- Glottolog: None

Judaeo-Papiamento, or Jewish Papiamentu (Papiamento: Zjudeo-papiamentu), is an endangered Jewish language and an ethnolect of Papiamento spoken by the Sephardic Jewish community of Curaçao in the Dutch Caribbean. It is likely the only living Jewish ethnolect based on a creole language and the only one based on a language native to the Kingdom of the Netherlands.

== Characteristics ==
Judeao-Papiamento is generally mutually intelligible with Papiamento, the main language of most Curaçaoans, locally known as Papiamentu. Papiamento is usually considered an originally Portuguese-based creole language that was subsequently partly relexified by Spanish, but some linguists argue the opposite, viewing it as a Spanish-based creole with a strong Portuguese influence.

Judeao-Papiamento differs from "general Papiamento" (papiamentu komun) as spoken by the non-Jewish population of Curaҫao in having a number of Hebrew loanwords as well as different pronunciation of many words common for all Papiamento varieties. Oftentimes, the Judeao-Papiamento versions of these words are closer to their Spanish or Portuguese counterparts, hinting at a possible process of decreolization. When speakers of any Papiamento variety talk in the more formal registers, they often use certain words from its lexifier languages almost unchanged. However, there is a difference in their choice of specific literary reference languages. Jewish speakers of Papiamento tend to prefer Portuguese and French, whereas non-Jewish Curaçaoans typically use Spanish words in the same settings.

=== Lexical contrasts ===
In one of her books, May Henriquez provides a table that shows some of the lexical contrasts between the speech of Jewish and non-Jewish Curaҫaoans.

Judaeo-Papiamento	General Papiamento	English meaning
afora	afó	out, outside
arepita	repa	arepa, round cornmeal pancake
bañu	baño	bath
bisñetu	bisañetu	great-grandson
bizjitá	bishitá	visit (verb)
bizjita	bishita	visit (noun)
desparesé	disparsé	disappear
dignitario	dignatario	dignitary
di repente	di ripiento	all of a sudden
festehá	selebrá	celebrate
festeho	selebrashon	celebration
fopá	vupá	misdeed
fora (djesei)	fuera (djesei)	besides that
gora, gwera	bora	gore, puncture
goza	gosa	enjoy, amuse
granmèrsi	gremesí	live on others’ expense
kamina	kaminda	road, way, where
kusta	kosta	cost (verb)
lanso	laken, laker	bedsheet
mata di roza	mata di rosa	rosebush

== Literature ==
- Jacobs, Bart (2016). "A New Perspective on the Linguistic Profile of the Curaҫaoan Sephardim". Journal of Jewish Languages. 4: 141–165. doi:10.1163/22134638-12340069.
- Jacobs, Neil G. (2020). "Curaҫao Sephardic Jewish Papiamentu in the Context of Jewish Languages". In Sutcliffe, Patricia C. (ed.). The Polymath Intellectual: A Festschrift in Honor of Professor Robert D. King. Dripping Springs, Texas: Agarita Press. pp. 103‒128.
- Shabashewitz, Dor (2023). "A Jewish creole language in the Caribbean". Forverts (in Yiddish).
