= Papiamento =

Creole language in the Dutch Caribbean

- Papiamento (Aruba); Papiamentu (Curaçao and Bonaire)
- Native to: Dutch Caribbean
- Native speakers: 350,000 (2025)
- Language family: Portuguese Creole: Afro-Portuguese Creole; Upper Guinea Creole; Papiamento
- Early form: Early Papiamento
- Writing system: Latin (Papiamento orthography)

Official status
- Official language in: Aruba; Bonaire; Curaçao (Note: Papiamento can be used in relations with the Dutch government.)
- Regulated by: Papiamento Academy Foundation

Language codes
- ISO 639-2: pap
- ISO 639-3: pap
- Glottolog: papi1253
- ELP: NE
- Linguasphere: 51-AAC-be
- The Papiamento-speaking world: regions where Papiamento is the language of the majority regions where Papiamento is the language of a significant minority

Papiamento (English: /ˌpæpiəˈmɛntoʊ, ˌpɑː-/), or Papiamentu (English: /-tuː/; Dutch: Papiaments [ˌpaːpijaːˈmɛnts]), is a Portuguese-based creole language spoken in the Dutch Caribbean. It is the most widely spoken language on Aruba, Bonaire, and Curaçao (the ABC islands).

The language, spelled Papiamento in Aruba and Papiamentu in Bonaire and Curaçao, is largely based on Portuguese as spoken in the 15th and 16th centuries, and has been influenced considerably by Dutch and Spanish. Lexical similarities between Portuguese and Spanish make it difficult to pinpoint the exact origin of some words. Though there are different theories about its origins, most linguists now believe that Papiamento emerged from the Portuguese-based creole languages of the West African coasts, as it has many similarities with Cape Verdean Creole and Guinea-Bissau Creole.

== History ==
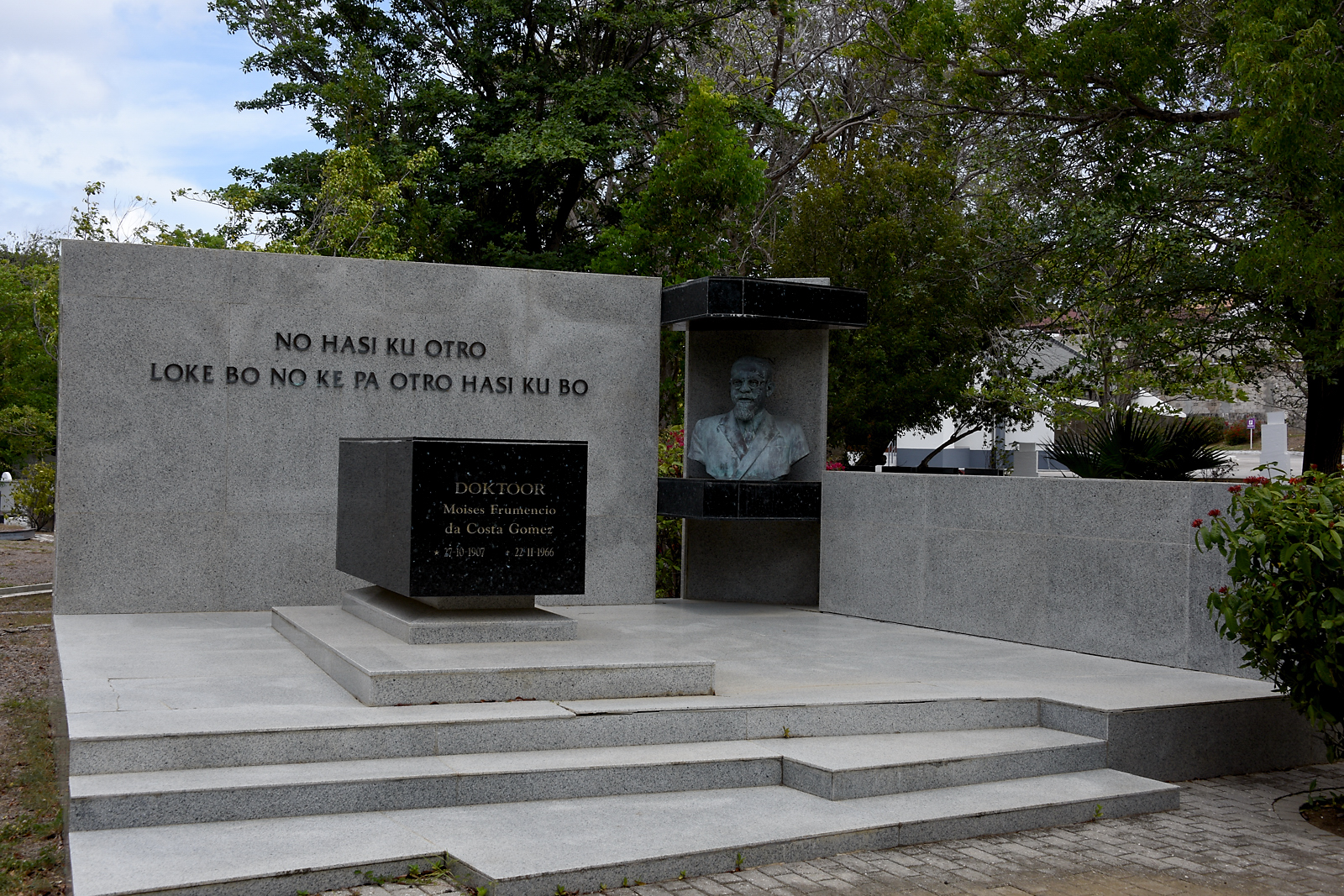
Burial site and monument to Doctor Moises Frumencio da Costa Gomez, the first prime minister of the Netherlands Antilles, with a message inscribed in Papiamento: No hasi ku otro loke bo no ke pa otro hasi ku bo, roughly meaning: "Do unto others as you would have others do unto you"

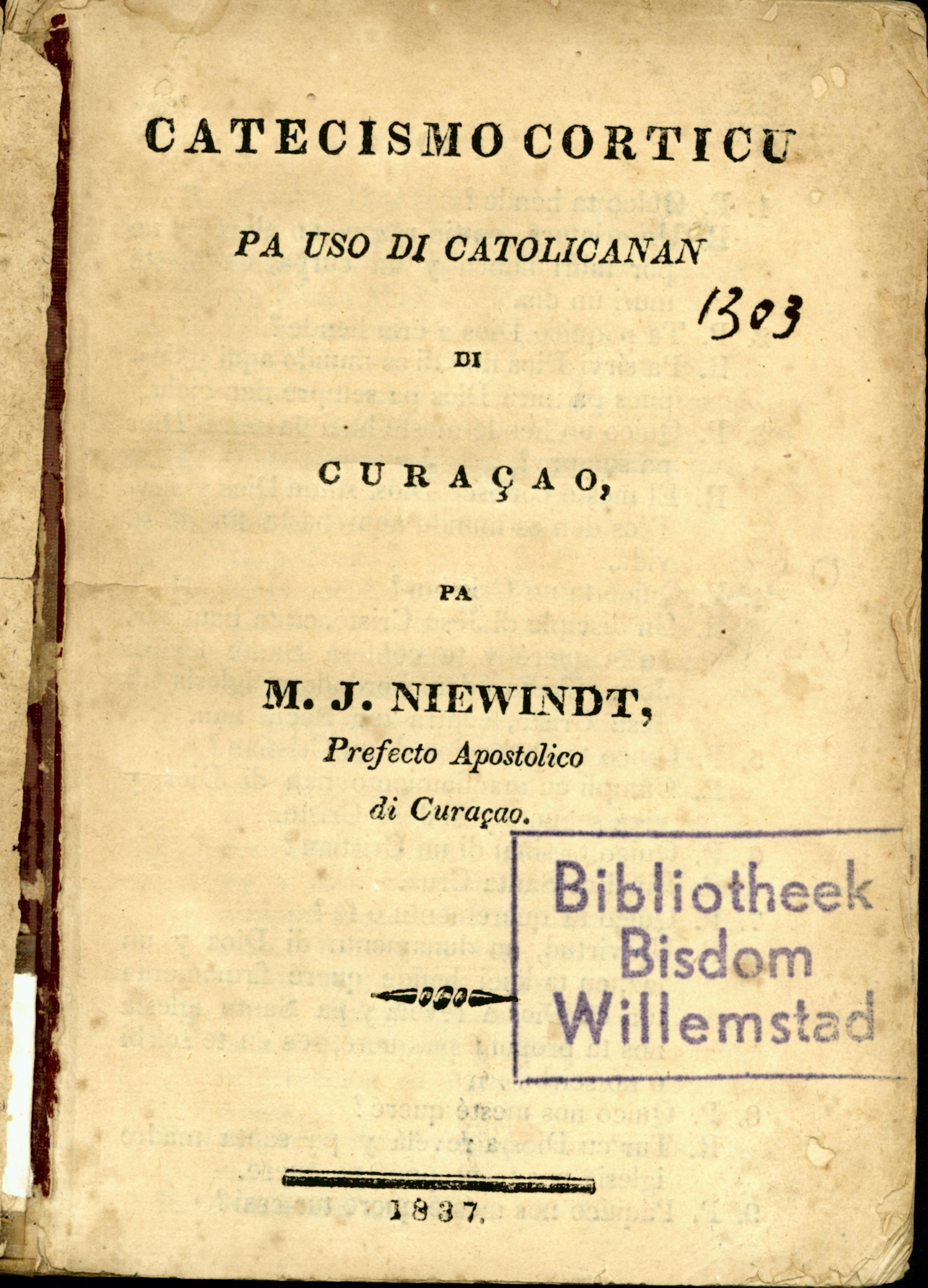
Catecismo Corticu – the first printed book in Papiamento in 1837

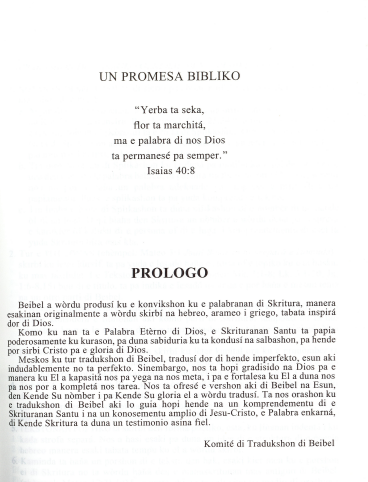
Papiamentu Bible, prologue

There are various theories about the origin and development of the Papiamento language, and precise history has not been established. Its parent language is surely West Iberian Romance, but scholars dispute whether Papiamento was derived from Portuguese and its derived Portuguese-based creole languages or from Spanish. Historical constraints, core vocabulary, and grammatical features that Papiamento shares with Cape Verdean Creole and Guinea-Bissau Creole are far less than those shared with Spanish, even though the Spanish and Dutch influences occurred later, from the 17th century onwards. In 1978, Jacoba Bouscholte conducted a study on the various Dutch influences in Papiamento. An example of a hybrid word is verfdó, which is a combination of a Dutch root verf (meaning 'paint') and the Portuguese and Spanish suffix -dor (used for a person who performs an action, like 'painter'). The transformation from verver to verfdó involved changing the -dor to -dó due to a linguistic process called apocopation.

The name of the language itself originates from papia, from Portuguese and Cape Verdean and Bissau Guinean Creole papear ("to chat, say, speak, talk"), with the addition of the noun-forming suffix -mento.

Spain claimed dominion over the islands in the 15th century but made little use of them. Portuguese merchants had been trading extensively in the West Indies and with the Iberian Union between Portugal and Spain during 1580–1640 period, their trade extended to the Spanish West Indies. In 1634, the Dutch West India Company (WIC) took possession of the islands, deporting most of the small remaining Arawak and Spanish population to the continent (mostly to the Venezuelan west coast and the Venezuelan plains, as well as all the way east to the Venezuela Orinoco basin and Trinidad), and turned them into the hub of the Dutch slave trade between Africa and the Caribbean.

The first evidence of widespread use of Papiamento in Aruba and Curaçao can be seen in official documents in the early 18th century. In the 19th century, most materials in the islands were written in Papiamento including Roman Catholic school books and hymnals. In 1837, the Catecismo Corticu pa uso di catolicanan di Curaçao (Brief Catechism for use by Catholics) was printed, the first printed book in Papiamento. In 2009 the Catecismo Corticu was added to the UNESCO Memory of the World register. The first Papiamento newspaper was published in 1871 and was called Civilisadó (The Civilizer).

=== Local development theory ===
One local development theory proposes that Papiamento developed in the Caribbean from an original Portuguese-African pidgin, with later Dutch and Spanish (and even some Arawak) influences.

Another theory is that Papiamento first evolved from the use in the region since 1499 of 'lenguas' and the first repopulation of the ABC Islands by the Spanish by the Cédula real decreed in November 1525 in which Juan Martinez de Ampués, factor of Hispaniola, had been granted the right to repopulate the depopulated Islas inútiles of Oroba, Islas de los Gigantes, and Buon Aire.

The evolution of Papiamento continued under the Dutch colonisation under the influence of 16th-century Dutch, Portuguese (Brazilian) and Native American languages (Arawak and Taíno), with the second repopulation of the ABC islands with immigrants who arrived from the ex-Dutch Brazilian colonies.

The Judaeo-Portuguese population of the ABC islands increased substantially after 1654, when the Portuguese recovered the Dutch-held territories in Northeast Brazil, causing most Portuguese-speaking Jews and their Portuguese-speaking Dutch allies and Dutch-speaking Portuguese Brazilian allies in those lands to flee from religious persecution. The precise role of Sephardic Jews in the early development is unclear, but Jews certainly played a prominent role in the later development of Papiamento. Many early residents of Curaçao were Sephardic Jews from Portugal, Spain, Cape Verde or Portuguese Brazil. Also, after the Eighty Years' War, a group of Sephardic Jews immigrated from Amsterdam. Therefore, it can be assumed that Judaeo-Portuguese was brought to the island of Curaçao, where it gradually spread to other parts of the community. The Jewish community became the prime merchants and traders in the area and so business and everyday trading was conducted in Papiamento. While various nations owned the island, and official languages changed with ownership, Papiamento became the constant language of the residents.

When the Netherlands opened economic ties with Spanish colonies in what are now Venezuela and Colombia in the 18th century, students on Curaçao, Aruba, and Bonaire were taught predominantly in Spanish, and Spanish began to influence the creole language. Since there was a continuous process (Hoetink, 1987), even the elite Dutch-Protestant settlers eventually communicated better in Spanish than in Dutch, as a wealth of local Spanish-language publications in the 19th century testify.

=== European and African origin theory ===
According to the European and African origin theory the origins of Papiamento lie in the Afro-Portuguese creoles that arose in the 16th century in the west coast of Africa and in the Portuguese Cape Verde islands. From the 16th to the late 17th centuries, most of the slaves taken to the Caribbean came from Portuguese trading posts (feitorias, transl. factories) in those regions. Around those ports, several Portuguese-African pidgin and creole languages developed, such as Cape Verdean Creole, Guinea-Bissau Creole, Angolar, and Forro (from São Tomé). The sister languages bear strong resemblance with Papiamento. According to this theory, Papiamento was derived from one or more of these older creoles or their predecessors, which were brought to the ABC islands by enslaved Africans and European traders from Cape Verde and West Africa. Later becoming the lingua franca between the various ethnic and religious groups of the islands.

The similarity between Papiamento and the other Afro-Portuguese creoles can be seen in the same pronouns used, mi, bo, el, nos, bos(o), being Portuguese-based. Afro-Portuguese creoles often have a shift from "v" to "b" and from "o" to "u": bientu (transl. wind), instead of viento. In creole and also in Spanish, ⟨v⟩ and ⟨b⟩ are pronounced the same. In creole, it is also written as a ⟨b⟩. Just as in Portuguese, an unaccented final ⟨o⟩ is pronounced as /u/.

Guene was the name given to four languages spoken by Africans on Western Curaçaoan plantations of Kenepa, Sabaneta, Lagun and Porto Marí. The name derives from "Guinea" or "Geni", but that does not give much clear indication of African origin, because this name referred to different areas in West Africa in the 17th and 18th centuries. There were possibly hundreds of Guene work songs used to make work lighter, organize work rhythms, guide task execution through instructions, and comment on work situations. Guene influence still exists in current Papiamentu in several domains. Difficulties in understanding its relevance today lies in how to distinguish between Guene and non-Guene contributions from African languages, what role the language(s) had in shaping non-linguistic cultural materials (such as hierarchical relationships, solidarity networks, relations to the ancestors, knowledge of soil types) and how this has been re-encoded into what we know today as Papiamentu.

=== Linguistic and historical ties with Upper Guinea Portuguese Creole ===
Since the late 1990s, research has been done that shines light on the ties between Papiamento and Upper Guinea Portuguese Creole. focus specifically on the linguistic and historical relationships with the Upper Guinea Portuguese Creole, as spoken on the Santiago island of Cape Verde and in Guinea-Bissau and Casamance.

In Bart Jacob's study The Upper Guinea Origins of Papiamento he defends the hypothesis that Papiamento is a relexified offshoot of an early Upper Guinea Portuguese Creole variety that was transferred from Senegambia to Curaçao in the second half of the 17th century, when the Dutch controlled the island of Gorée, a slave trading stronghold off the coast of Senegal. The Creole was used for communication among slaves and between slaves and slave holders.

On Curaçao, this variety underwent internal changes as well as contact-induced changes at all levels of the grammar, but particularly in the lexicon, due to contact with Spanish and, to a lesser extent, Dutch. Despite the changes, the morphosyntactic framework of Papiamento is still remarkably close to that of the Upper Guinea Creoles of Cape Verde and Guinea-Bissau. Parallels have also been identified between the development of Papiamento and Catholicism.

=== Present status ===
Papiamento is spoken in all aspects of society throughout Aruba, Curaçao and Bonaire.

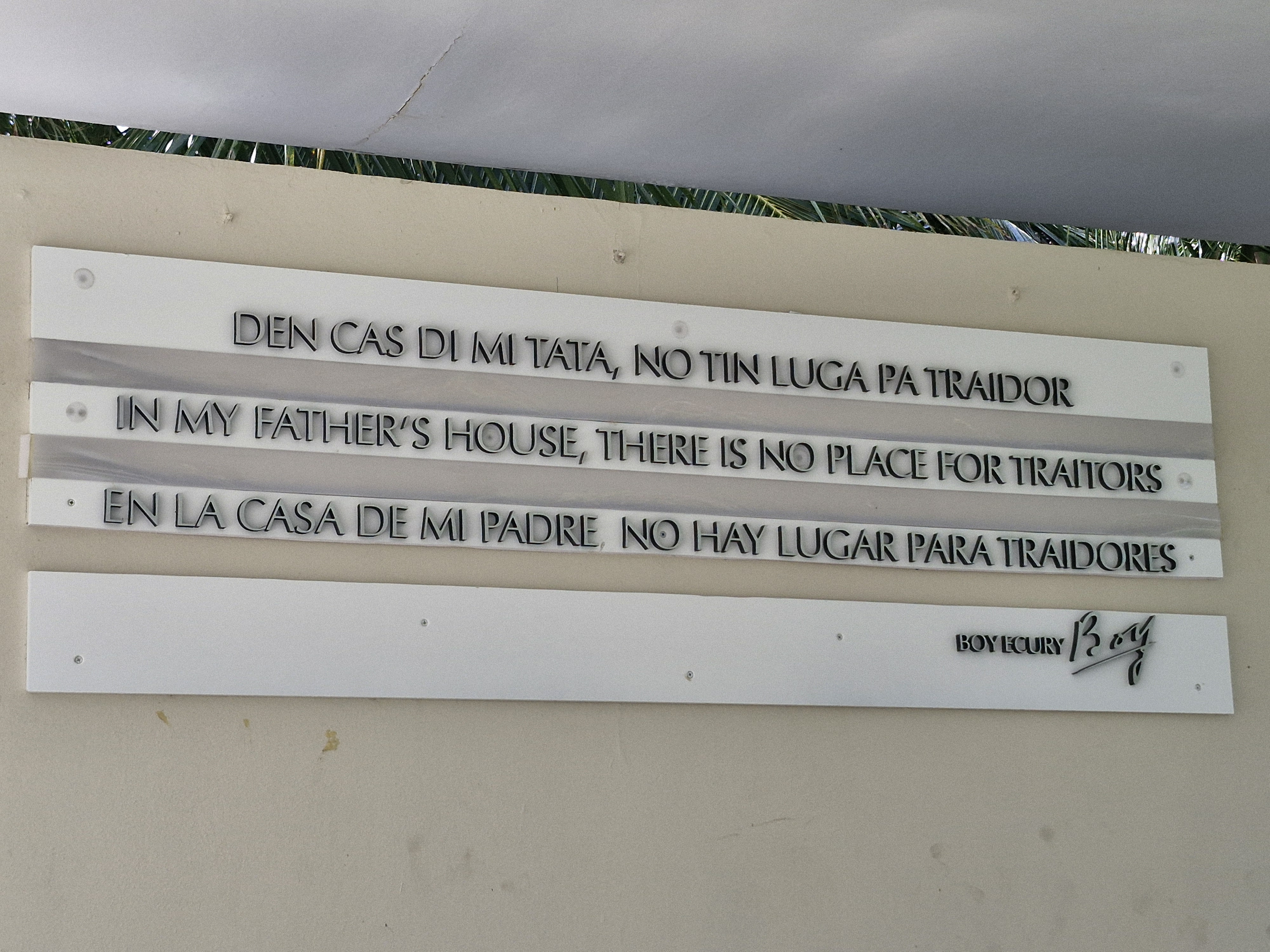
A message in Boy Ecury Park written in Aruban Papiamento, English, and Spanish

Papiamento has been an official language of Aruba since May 2003. In the former Netherlands Antilles, Papiamento was made an official language on 7 March 2007. After the dissolution of the Netherlands Antilles on 10 October 2010, Papiamento's official status was confirmed in the newly formed Caribbean Netherlands.

Venezuelan Spanish and American English are constant influences today. Code-switching and lexical borrowing from Spanish, Dutch and English among native speakers is common. This is considered as a threat to the development of the language because of the loss of the authentic and Creole "feel" of Papiamento.

Many immigrants from other parts of the Americas and the Caribbean choose to learn Papiamento because it is more practical in daily life on the islands. For Spanish-speakers, it is easier to learn than Dutch, because Papiamento uses many Spanish and Portuguese words.

The first opera in Papiamento, adapted by Carel de Haseth from his novel Katibu di Shon, was performed at the Stadsschouwburg in Amsterdam on 1 July 2013, commemorating the 150th anniversary of the ending of slavery in the Dutch Caribbean.

=== Old Papiamento texts ===
The Papiamento language originates from about 1650. The oldest Papiamento texts that have been preserved are written letters. In the following three letters it can be seen that the words changed and the spelling became closer to the Dutch spelling. Although some words are no longer in use, the basis of Papiamento did not change much.

==== Piter May letter 1775 ====
The oldest letter dates from 1775. It was sent by the Sephardic Jew Abraham Andrade to his mistress Sarah Vaz Parro, about a family meeting in the centre of Curaçao.

| Old Papiamento | Modern Papiamento | English |
| Piter May the ora ky boso a biny. My a topa tio la, ku Sara meme. Nan taba biny Punta. My Dusie, bo pay a manda bo ruman Aronchy, ku Tony & Merca koge na kamina dy Piter May. Es nigrita Antunyca & nan a ybel tras dy forty, & nan a manda sutel guatapana. Mas my no saby pa ky razon. Sy bo saby, manda gabla, ku my Dios pagabo. Bida, manda gabla ku my, kico Bechy a biny busca na Punta & borbe bay asina presto. | Mi tabata na Pietermaai te ora ku boso a bini. Mi a topa tio aya, ku Sara meimei. Nan tabata bini na Punda. Mi dushi, bo pai a manda bo ruman Aronchy, ku Tony i Merka kohe na kaminda di Pietermaai. E negrita Antunika... nan a hib'é tras di fòrti, i nan a manda sut'é na e watapana. Pero mi no sabi pa ki rason. Si bo sabi, manda palabra, ku mi Dios ta bai pagabo. Mi Bida, manda palabra ku mi, kiko Becky a bini buska na Punda, i bolbe bai asina lihé. | I was in Pietermaai until the time you came. I met uncle there, and Sara halfway. They were coming to Punda. My sweetheart, your father sent your brother Aronchy, and Tony and Merka went on their way to Pietermaai. That negress Antunika... they brought her behind the fort, sent to be whipped at the divi-divi tree. But I don't know for what reason. If you know, send me a message, and my God will reward you. My Life, send me a word what Becky came looking for in Punda, and then return as quickly. |

==== Boo Jantje letter 1783 ====
The next letter dates from 1783 and was recently discovered in an English archive. It was sent by Anna Charje in the name of her baby Jantje Boufet to her husband Dirk Schermer in Rotterdam. (The final sentence is standard Dutch.)

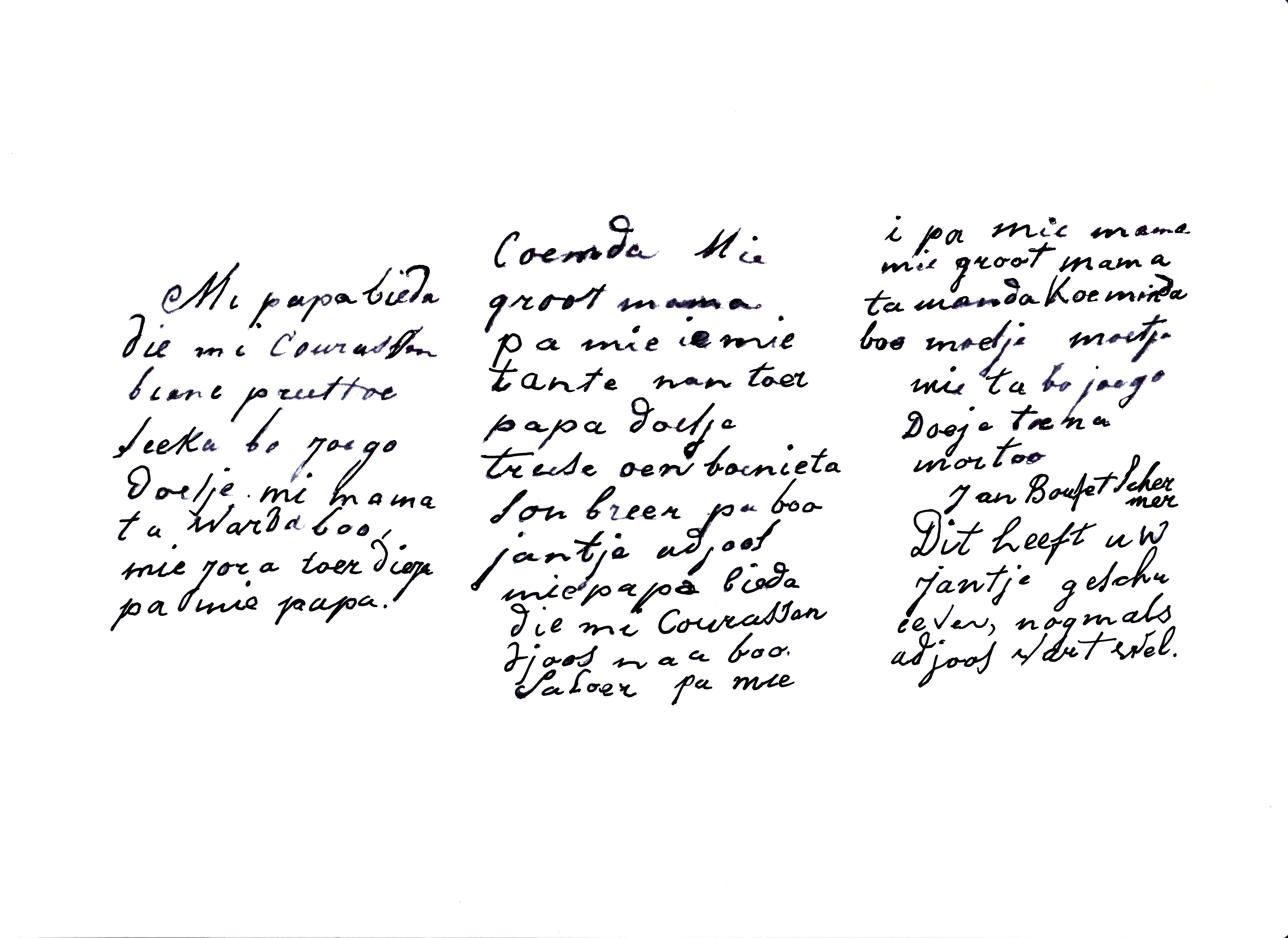
Boo Jantje letter from 1783

| Old Papiamento | Modern Papiamento | English |
| Mi papa, bieda die mi Courasson, bieni prees toe seeka bo joego doesje. Mi mama ta warda boo, mie jora toer dieja pa mie papa. Coemda Mie groot mama pa mie, ie mie tante nan toer. Papa doesje, treese oen boenieta sonbreer pa boo Jantje. Adjoos mie papa, bieda die mi Courasson. Djoos naa boo saloer, pa mie i pa mie mama. Mie groot mama ta manda koemenda boo moetje moetje. Mie ta bo joego Doeje toe na mortoo. Dit heeft uw Jantje geschreeven, nogmals adjoos, vart wel. | Mi papa, bida di mi kurason, bini lihé serka bo yu dushi. Mi mama ta warda bo, mi ta yora tur dia pa mi papa. Kumindá mi wela pa mi, i mi tantanan tur. Papa dushi, trese un bunita sombré pa bo Jantje. Ayó mi papa, bida di mi kurason. Dios duna bo salú, pa mi i pa mi mama. Mi wela ta manda kumindá bo muchu muchu. Mi ta bo yu dushi te na morto. Dit heeft uw Jantje geschreven, nogmaals adios, vaarwel. | My father, life of my heart, come quickly close to your sweet son. My mother awaits you, I cry all day for my father. Greet my grandmother for me, and all my aunts. Dear father, bring a nice hat for your Jantje. Goodbye my father, life of my heart. May God give you health, from me and from my mother. Send my grandmother many many greetings. I am your sweet son until death. This is written by your Jantje, once again adios, goodbye. |

==== Quant Court affidavit 1803 ====
The third text dates from 1803. It is an affidavit (written testimony for use in a court of law as evidence) signed by 26 Aruban farm workers to support their supervisor Pieter Specht against false accusations by landowner B.G. Quant.

| Old Papiamento | Modern Papiamento | English |
| Noos ta firma por la berdad, y para serbir na teenpoe qui lo llega die moosteer. Qui des die teempoe koe Señor B.G. Quant ta poner, na serbisje die tera... Ta maltrata noos comandeur Pieter Specht pa toer soorto die koos. Y seemper el dho Quant ta precura die entreponeel deen toer gobierno die comandeur. Por ees motibo, noos ta esprimenta koe eel ta causa die toer disunion. | Nos ta firma pa e berdad y pa sirbi den e tempo aki lo yega di mester. Cu di e tempo e cu señor B.G. Quant ta pone, na servicio di e tera... Ta maltrata nos commandeur Pieter Specht pa tur sorto di cos. Y semper el señor Quandt ta percura di entremete den tur gobierno di commandeur. Pa e motibo, nos ta experencia cu el ta causa di tur desunion. | We sign for the truth and to serve the coming time if necessary. About our time with B.G. Quant we declare, we were employed in land cultivation... He always mistreated our commander Pieter Specht for all sort of things. And always mister Quant interfered with all instructions of the commander. For that reason, we declare that he caused all the discord. |

== Orthography and spelling ==
Papiamento is written using the Latin script.

Since the 1970s, two different orthographies have been developed and adopted. In 1976, Curaçao and Bonaire officially adopted the Römer-Maduro-Jonis version, a phonetic spelling. In 1977, Aruba approved a more etymology-based spelling, presented by the Comision di Ortografia (Orthography Commission), presided by Jossy Mansur.

== Distribution and dialects ==
Papiamento is primarily spoken on Aruba, Curaçao and Bonaire. The language is also spoken by the respective diasporas of the ABC islands, most notably in the Netherlands, and to a lesser extent Sint Maarten. An earlier, now-extinct form of Papiamento was formerly spoken on the Paraguana peninsula of Venezuela.

There are two main dialects of Papiamento, the dialect of Aruba (Papiamento) and the dialect of Curaçao and Bonaire (Papiamentu), with lexical and intonational differences. There are also minor differences between Curaçao and Bonaire.

The most apparent difference between the two dialects is given away in the name difference. Whereas Bonaire and Curaçao opted for a phonology-based spelling, Aruba uses an etymology-based spelling. Many words in Aruba end with "o" while the same word ends with "u" in Bonaire and Curaçao. And even in Curaçao, the use of the u-ending is still more pronounced among the Sephardic Jewish population. Similarly, the use of "k" in Bonaire and Curaçao replaces "c" in Aruba.

For example:

| English | Curaçao and Bonaire | Aruba | Portuguese | Spanish |
|---|---|---|---|---|
| Lead (metal) | Chumbu | Chumbo | Chumbo | Plomo |
| Stick | Palu | Palo | Pau | Palo |
| House | Kas | Cas | Casa | Casa |
| Knife | Kuchú | Cuchiu | Faca (Cutelo, Cultro) | Cuchillo |

In the past, certain rural areas of Aruba and Curaçao featured the guttural R (a feature common in French) or omitted the letter S at the end of words (a feature common in Caribbean Spanish). However it is likely many of these rural features have either disappeared over time or are used by few speakers today.

There is also a Jewish ethnolect of the language, known as Judaeo-Papiamento.

== Phonology ==
=== Vowels and diphthongs ===
Papiamento vowels are based on Ibero-Romance and Dutch vowels. Papiamento has the following nine vowels:

Vowels
| IPA | Curaçao and Bonaire | Aruba | English |
|---|---|---|---|
| a | a in kana | a in cana | walk |
| e | e in efekto | e in efecto | effect |
| ɛ | è in balèt | e in ballet | ballet |
| ǝ | e in apel | e in appel | apple |
| i | i in chikí | i in chikito | small |
| o | o in obra | o in obra | work |
| ɔ | ò in ònbeskòp | o in onbeschoft | impolite |
| u | u in kunuku | u in cunucu | farm |
| ø | ù in brùg | u in brug | bridge |

Papiamento has diphthongs, two vowels in a single syllable that form one sound. Papiamento diphthongs are based on Ibero-Romance and Dutch diphthongs. It has the following diphthongs:

Diphthongs
| IPA | Papiamento | English |
|---|---|---|
| ai̯ | ai in baile | dance |
| au̯ | au in fauna | fauna |
| ei̯ | ei in esey | that |
| ɛi̯ | ei in prijs | price |
| eu̯ | eu in leu | far |
| ɔi̯ | oi in join | join |
| oi̯ | oi in morocoy | tortoise |
| ɔu̯ | ou in abou | down |
| ʏi̯ | ui in duim | thumb |

=== Stress and accent ===
Stress is very important in Papiamento. Many words have a very different meaning when a different stress is used:

- When both syllables are equally stressed, kome, it means "to eat".
- When the first syllable is stressed, kome, it means "eat!" (imperative).
- However, kom'é (short for kome é) means "eat it!"

There are general rules for the stress and accent but also a great many exceptions. When a word deviates from the rules, the stressed vowel is indicated by an acute accent ( ´ ), but it is often omitted in casual writing.

The main rules are:

- When a noun ends in a vowel (a, e, i, o, u), the stress is placed upon the penultimate (before last) syllable: buriku ("donkey").
- When a noun ends in a consonant, the stress is placed upon the last syllable: hospital.
- When a verb has two syllables, the syllables are about equally stressed: sòru ("to care"), falta ("to lack").
- When a verb has more than two syllables, the stress is laid upon the last syllable: kontestá ("to answer"), primintí ("to promise").

== Grammar ==
Papiamento grammar has many features typical of Atlantic creole languages. These include its use of time and aspect markers instead of tenses, its use of a single pronoun form for object, subject and possessive, a lack of grammatical gender, the use of the third person pronoun (nan) to mark the plural and a fixed word order for questions and affirmations. However, it also displays some traits which are unusual in creole languages, for example the existence of participles and gerunds as well as a wide range of prepositions.

=== Word order ===
The typical word order in Papiamento is subject, time and aspect marker, verb, indirect object, direct object. However, exceptions to this exist for the time and aspect marker lo and certain fronting strategies.

Cardinal word order in Papiamento
Mi a duna Maria e buki na skol.
"I gave Maria the book at school."
| Subject | TAM | verb | Indirect object | Direct Object | Prepositional Phrase |
| Mi | a | duna | Maria | e buki | na skol |
| I | past marker | give | Maria | the book | locative preposition school |

In addition to this, Papiamento has a passive voice which uses the verbs ser or wordu and the past participle.

Passive word order in Papiamento
E kas a wòrdu iferf.
"The house was painted."
| Article | Noun | TAM | Passive auxiliary | Participle |
| e | kas | a | wòrdu | iferf |
| the | house | past marker | passive marker | painted |

=== Pronouns ===
Papiamento has a system of emphatic and non-emphatic pronouns.

Emphatic personal pronouns
| 1sg | ami | "I" |
| 2sg | abo | "you" |
| 3sg | - | - |
| 1pl | anos | "we" |
| 2pl | aboso | "youse" |
| 3pl | anan | "they" |

Non-emphatic personal pronouns
| 1sg | mi | "I/me" |
| 2sg | bo | "you" |
| 3sg | e-el | "he/him", "she/ her", "it" |
| 1pl | nos | "we/us" |
| 2pl | boso | "youse" |
| 3pl | nan | "they/them" |

The non-emphatic pronouns are subject, object and possessive pronouns, whereas the emphatic pronouns usually represent the subject of the verb.

=== Markers ===
As Papiamento almost completely lacks verbal inflection, the time an action took place is indicated by a particle called a tense-aspect-mood (TAM) marker. The following markers exist:

Tense, aspect, mood markers
| Marker | Use |
|---|---|
| ta | present, progressive or simultaneous action |
| a | past or perfective |
| tabata or tawata | past, imperfective |
| lo | future or potential |
| sa | habitual |

=== Nouns ===
Nouns are not grammatically marked for gender. They can be marked for the plural with the suffix -nan, but this only occurs when the nouns are definite.

- Mi gusta sapatu. ("I like shoes.")
- Mi gusta e sapatunan. ("I like the shoes.")
- Mi gusta bo sapatunan. ("I like your shoes.")

== Lexicon ==
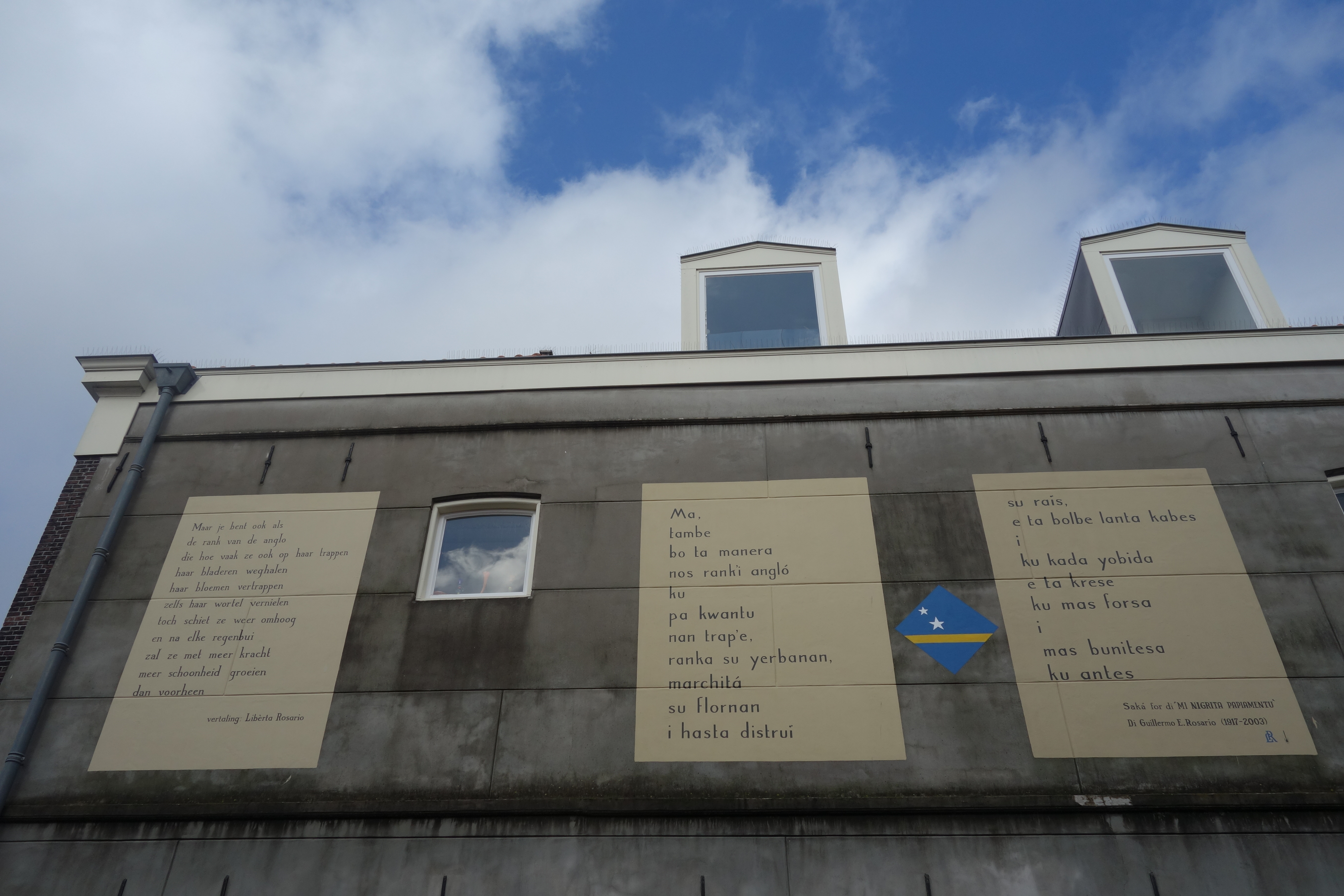
Poems in Papiamento, Leiden

=== Vocabulary ===
Most of the vocabulary is derived from Portuguese and derived Portuguese-based creoles and (Early Modern) Spanish. Most of the remaining vocabulary derives from Dutch. The real origin is usually difficult to tell because the two Iberian languages are very similar, and adaptations were made in Papiamento. A list of 200 basic Papiamento words can be found in the standard Swadesh list, with etymological reference to the language of origin. There is a remarkable similarity between words in Papiamento, Cape Verdean Creole, and Guinea-Bissau Creole, which all belong to the same language family of the Upper Guinea Creoles. Most of the words can be connected with their Portuguese origin.

Linguistic studies have shown that roughly 80% of the words in Papiamento's present vocabulary are of Iberian origin, 20% are of Dutch origin, and some of Native American or African origin. A study by Van Buurt and Joubert inventoried the words of Taíno and Caquetío Arawak origin, mostly words for plants and animals. Arawak is an extinct language that was spoken by Indigenous people throughout the Caribbean. The Arawak words were re-introduced in Papiamento by borrowing from the Spanish dialect of Venezuela Some research indicates that some Papiamento vocabulary may derive from English and Caribbean English Creoles, such as Jamaican Patois. There is also an English influence on Papiamento grammar.

Many words are of Iberian origin, and it is impossible to label them as either Portuguese or Spanish:

- por fabor ("please") – Portuguese: por favor – Spanish: por favor
- señora ("madam") – Portuguese: senhora – Spanish: señora
- kua ("which") – Portuguese: qual – Spanish: cuál
- kuantu ("how much") – Portuguese: quanto – Spanish: cuánto

While the presence of word-final /u/ can easily be traced to Portuguese, the diphthongisation of some vowels is characteristic of Spanish. The use of /b/, rather than /v/, descends from its pronunciation in the dialects of northern Portugal as well as of Spanish. Also, a sound shift may have occurred in the direction of Spanish, whose influence on Papiamento came later than that of Portuguese: subrino ("nephew"): sobrinho in Portuguese, sobrino in Spanish. The pronunciation of o as /u/ is certainly Portuguese, but the use of n instead of nh (/ɲ/) in the ending -no is from Spanish.

Few Portuguese words come directly from Portuguese, but most come via the Portuguese-based creole; in the examples below, the Cape Verdean Creole equivalents are borboléta, katchor, prétu and fórsa.

Portuguese-origin words:

- barbulètè ("butterfly") – Portuguese: borboleta
- kachó ("dog") – Portuguese: cachorro
- pretu ("black") – Portuguese: preto
- forsa ("power") – Portuguese: força

Spanish-origin words:

- siudat ("city") – Spanish: ciudad
- sombré ("hat") – Spanish: sombrero
- karson ("trousers") – Spanish: calzón
- hòmber ("man") – Spanish: hombre

Dutch-origin words:

- apel ("apple") – Dutch: appel
- buki ("book") – Dutch: boek
- lesa ("to read") – Dutch: lezen
- mart ("March") – Dutch: maart

English-origin words:

- bèk – English: back
- bòter – English: bottle
- beisbòl - English: baseball
- baiskel – English: bicycle

African-origin words:

- pinda ("peanut") – Kongo: mpinda
- makamba ("Dutch person") – Bantu: ma-kamba
- yongotá ("to kneel") – Wolof: djongotó
- maribomba ("wasp") – Bantu: ma-rimbondo

Native American-origin words:

- orkan ("hurricane") – Taíno: juracán
- maishi ("corn") – Taíno: mahíz
- kunuku ("farm") – Taíno: conuco
- mahos ("ugly") – Arawak: muhusu

== Literature and culture ==
Aruba, Bonaire, and Curaçao's national anthems are in Papiamento, "Aruba Dushi Tera", "Tera di Solo y suave biento" and "Lanta nos bos ban kanta" respectively, as was the anthem of the Netherlands Antilles. The newspapers Diario, Vigilante and Extra are also in the language.

Printed literature in the language dates back to the 19th century, starting 1837 with Corticu pa uso di catolicanan di Curaçao (translation of the Roman Catholic catechism)- the oldest surviving full book in Papiamento- and the 1871 newspaper Civilisadó. The 20th century saw the growth of native prose and poetry, pioneered by writers such as Frank Martinus Arion, Pierre Lauffer, and Tip Marugg.

The 2013 films Abo So (Aruba) and Sensei Redenshon (Curaçao) were the first feature films in Papiamento; the comedy Bon Bini Holland (Curaçao and Netherlands) also contains some Papiamento.

== Examples ==
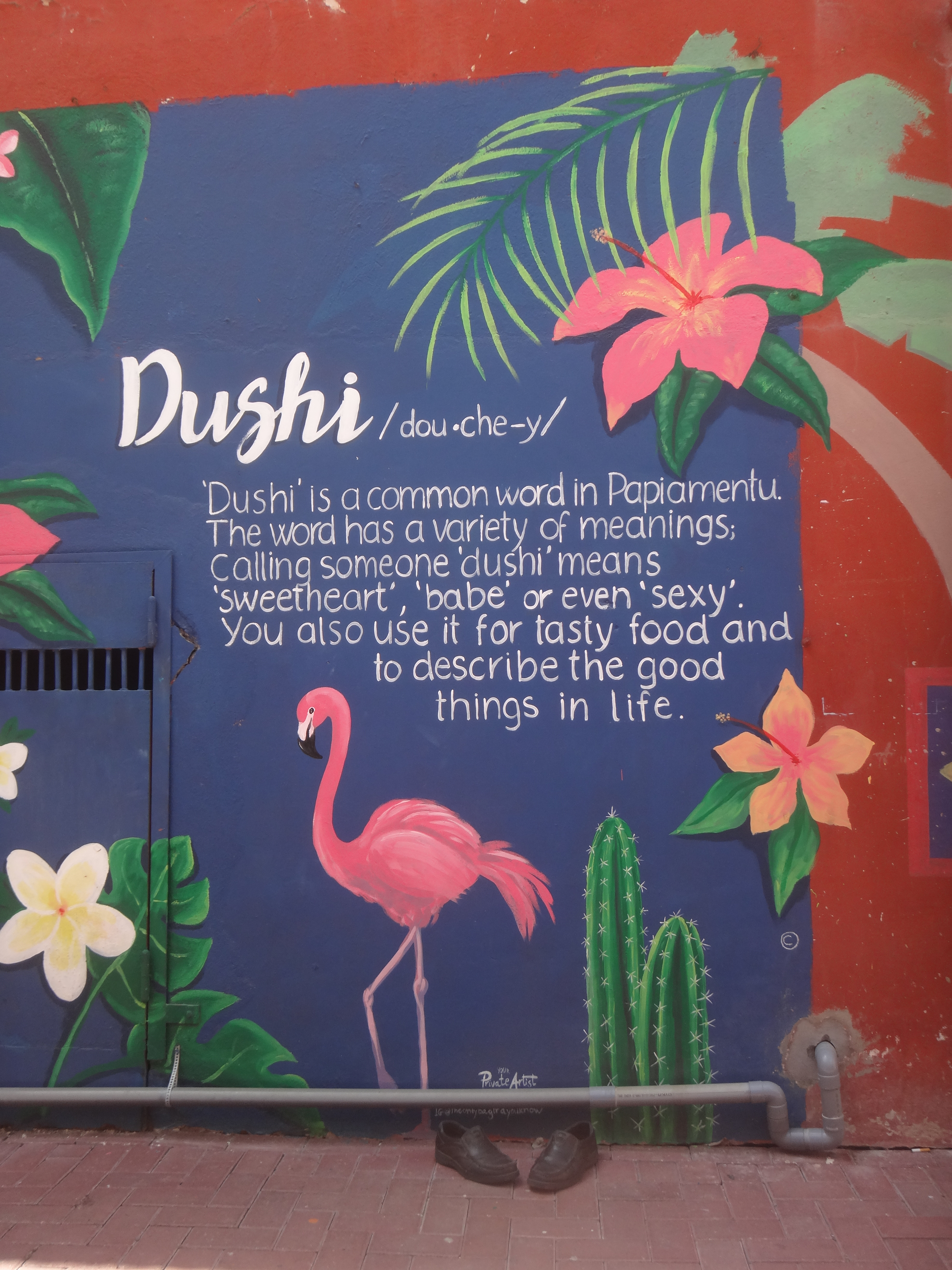
The meaning of dushi explained in Caribbean style

=== Phrase and word samples ===
- Kon ta bai? (How are you?) – Portuguese: Como vai?
- Kon ta k'e bida? (How is life?) – Spanish: ¿Cómo te va la vida? – Portuguese: Como tá a vida?
- Por fabor (please) – Spanish: Por favor – Portuguese: Por favor
- Danki (Thank you) – Dutch: Dank je
- Ainda no (Not yet) – Portuguese: Ainda não
- Bo mama ta mashá bunita (Your mother is very beautiful) – Portuguese: Vossa mãe é muito bonita
- Na epoka di mi añanan eskolar (During my school years) – Portuguese: Na época dos meus anos (Spanish: años) escolares
- Bati boka (Argument) – Portuguese: Bate-boca
- Bringa (A fight; to fight) – Portuguese: Briga, brigar
- Bon (Good) – Portuguese: Bom

=== Expressions ===
- Hopi skuma, tiki chukulati (A lot of foam, little chocolate): Too good to be true.
- Einan e porko su rabo ta krul (That is where the pig's tail curls): That is where the problem lies.
- Sopi pura ta sali salo (Quick soup turns salty): Good things take time.
- E ke bula ku ala di manteka (He wants to fly with wings of butter): He wants to do more than he can handle.
- Ora dia ta serka di habri, nochi ta mas skur (Just before dawn, the night is darkest): When need is greatest, salvation is near.

=== Lord's Prayer ===
The Lord's Prayer in a register of Papiamento used liturgically by the Roman Catholic Church, compared with Spanish, Portuguese, and King James English:

| Papiamento | Spanish | Portuguese | English |
|---|---|---|---|
| Nos Tata, cu ta na shelo, bo Nomber sea santifica, laga bo Reino bini na nos.; Bo boluntad sea hasi na terra como na shelo.; Duna nos awe nos pan di cada dia; y pordona nos nos debe, mescos cu nos ta pordona nos debedornan.; Y no laga nos cai den tentacion, ma libra nos di malo.; Amèn. | Padre nuestro, que estás en el cielo.; Santificado sea tu nombre.; Venga tu reino.; Hágase tu voluntad en la tierra como en el cielo.; Danos hoy nuestro pan de cada día.; Perdona nuestras ofensas, como también nosotros perdonamos a los que nos ofenden.; No nos dejes caer en tentación; y líbranos del mal.; Amén. | Pai nosso, que estais nos céus; Santificado seja o vosso nome.; Venha a nós o vosso Reino; seja feita a vossa vontade, assim na terra como no céu.; O pão nosso de cada dia nos dai hoje.; Perdoai as nossas ofensas, assim como perdoamos a quem nos tem ofendido.; E não nos deixeis cair em tentação, mas livrai-nos do mal.; Amén. | Our Father, who art in Heaven, hallowed be Thy name.; Thy kingdom come.; Thy will be done on Earth as it is in Heaven.; Give us this day our daily bread, and forgive our trespasses, as we forgive those who trespass against us.; And lead us not into temptation, but deliver us from the evil one.; Amen. |

== Comparison of vocabularies ==
This section provides a comparison of the vocabularies of Papiamento, Portuguese, and the Portuguese creoles of Guinea-Bissau and Cape Verde. Spanish is shown for the contrast.

| English | Curaçao and Bonaire | Aruba | Portuguese | Guinea-Bissau | Cape Verdean | Spanish |
|---|---|---|---|---|---|---|
| Good morning | Bon dia | Bon dia | Bom dia | Bon dia | Bon dia | Buen día - Buenos días |
| Thank you | Danki | Danki | Obrigado | Obrigadu | Obrigadu | Gracias |
| How are you? | Kon ta bai? | Con ta bay? | Como estás? Como vais? Como (você) está? Como vai? | Kumá ku bu na bai?¹ | Módi ki bu sta?² | ¿Cómo te va? ¿Cómo estás? |
| Very good | Mashá bon | Masha bon | Muito bom | Mutu bon | Mutu bon | Muy bueno |
| I am fine | Mi ta bon | Mi ta bon | Estou bem | N sta diritu | N sta dretu | Estoy bien |
| I | Mi | Mi | Eu | N³ | N³ | Yo |
| I am | (A)Mi ta | (A)Mi ta | Eu sou | (A)Mi i | (A)Mi e | Yo soy |
| Have a nice day | Pasa un bon dia | Pasa un bon dia | Tem um bom dia Tenha um bom dia | Pasa un bon dia | Pasa un bon dia | Pasa un buen día |
| See you later | Te aweró | Te aworo | Até logo | Te logu | Te lógu | Hasta luego |
| Food | Kuminda | Cuminda | Comida | Kumida | Kumida | Comida |
| Bread | Pan | Pan | Pão | Pon | Pon | Pan |
| Not yet | Ainda no | Ainda no | Ainda não | Inda nau | Inda nau² | Aún no |
| I like Curaçao | Mi gusta Kòrsou | Mi gusta Corsou | Eu gosto de Curaçau | N gosta di Curaçau | N gosta di Curaçau | Me gusta Curazao |

¹ Liter. "How are you going?"

² Santiago dialect

³ Unstressed (subject) form. The stressed (non-subject) form is "mi".

== See also ==
- Kristang language (Papia Kristang, Malaccan Creole Portuguese)
- Creole language
- Portuguese-based creole languages
- Monogenetic theory of pidgins
- Linguistics
- Joceline Clemencia
- Judaeo-Papiamento
