= Yeven Mezulah =

17th-century book by Nathan ben Moses Hannover

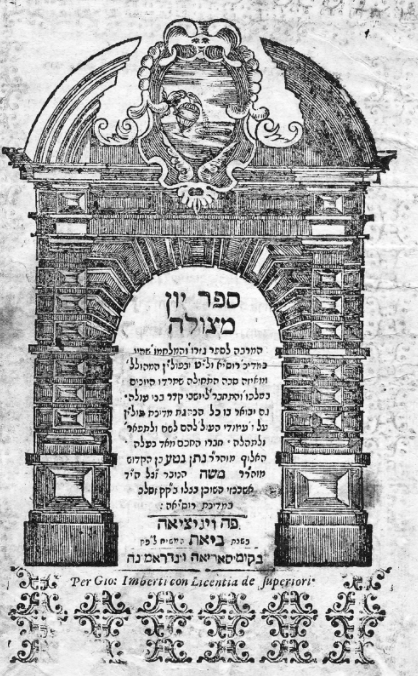
Title page says: "Book Depth of Mire", original 1653 edition

Yeven Mezulah (Hebrew: יון מצולה), translated into English as Abyss of Despair, is a 17th-century book by Nathan ben Moses Hannover. It describes the course of the Khmelnytsky Uprising in the Polish–Lithuanian Commonwealth from a Jewish perspective. Hannover in this work gives a brief description of the Polish Crown of the time and of the relations between the Poles, Jews and Cossacks, and the causes which led to the uprising. He also gives a vivid picture of Jewish life in Poland and the yeshivot.

== Publication history ==
The book was printed in Hebrew in Venice in 1653. It was translated into Yiddish (1687), into German (1720), and into French by Daniel Levy (published by Benjamin II, Tlemçen, 1855). Daniel Levy's translation was revised by the historian J. Lelewel, and served as a basis for Meyer Kayserling's German translation (also published by Benjamin II, Hanover, 1863). Kostomarov, utilizing Salomon Mandelkern's Russian translation, gives many extracts from it in his Bogdan Chmielnicki (iii. 283–306).. It was translated into English as Abyss of Despair by Abraham J. Mesch in 1950, reprinted in 1983 (ISBN 0878559272) with a foreword by William B. Helmreich.

== Sources and credibility ==
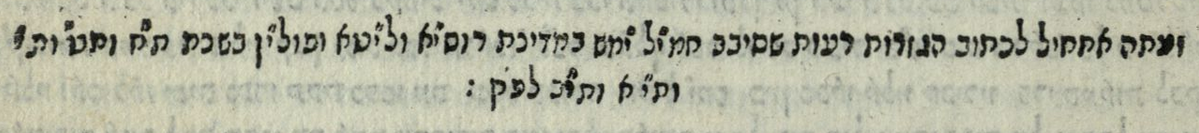
First edition of Yeven Mezulah (1653): "I write of the Evil Decrees of Chmiel, may his name be obliterated... in (5)'408 to '411 Anno Mundi"

Rabbi Hannover witnessed the outbreak of the events in Zasław, from which he fled to Międzybóż. In addition, he compiled the rest of the book from rumors and other printed sources: "Tzok ha-Ittim" [Sufferings of the Times] by Meir ben Samuel of Shcherbreshin (published in 1650), "Meghillat Efa" [Scroll of Darkness] by Shabbatai HaKohen (1651), and "Petach Teshuva" (פתח תשובה, "Gates of Penitence") by Gabriel Ben Yehoshua Schussburg (1651).

In the late 20th century some historians disputed the numbers given Yeven Mezulah. They claim it overstates Jewish casualties during the Khmelnytsky pogroms in 1648 and 1649. These authors tend to question it as a reliable historical source in spite of its literary qualities. Yeven Mezulah was criticized in particular by Shaul Stampfer, Edward Fram, Paul Robert Magocsi's A History of Ukraine, and Petro Mirchuk. However other authors regard it as a reliable historical account.

== Book title ==
The author writes in his introduction "I named my book YEVEN M'TZULAH (THE DEEP MIRE) because the words of Psalmist allude to these terrible events." (Earlier he is speaking of Psalm 69). Before that, in the introduction the author performs some gematria: "TAVATI B'YAVAN M'FZULAH (I am sunk in a deep mire) is of the same numerical value as "CHMIEL VKEDAR B'YAVAN YACHDAV CHUBARU (Chmiel[nitski] and the Tartars joined together with the "Greeks"), which involves a biblical pun: hinting that he sunk into the mire of Yevanim (the word is derived from "Ionians" i.e., "Greeks", which is a metonymic hint to the Eastern (Greek) Orthodox Church, i.e., Cossacks/Ruthenians). Jakob Josef Petuchowski suggests that this pun / allusion ("mire"/"Greeks"/"Russians") was known to the censors of the Russian Empire and therefore Yeven Mezulah was banned.

== Modern translations ==
- 1912: Polish by Majer Balaban as Jawein mecula, t.j. Bagno głębokie. Kronika zdarzeń z lat 1648–1652 napisana przez Natana Hannowera z Zasławia i wydana po raz pierwszy w Wenecyi w r. 1653
- 1950: English by Abraham Mesch as Abyss of Despair (Yeven Metzulah): The Famous 17th Century Chronicle Depicting Jewish Life in Russia and Poland During the Chmielnicki Massacres of 1648–1649
- 1997: Russian by Saul Borovoi as Пучина бездонная: Еврейские хроники XVII столетия
- 2010: Ukrainian by Natalya Yakovenko as Глибокий мул. Хроніка Натана Гановера (ISBN 978-966-378-154-9)
