= Simon Kayserling =

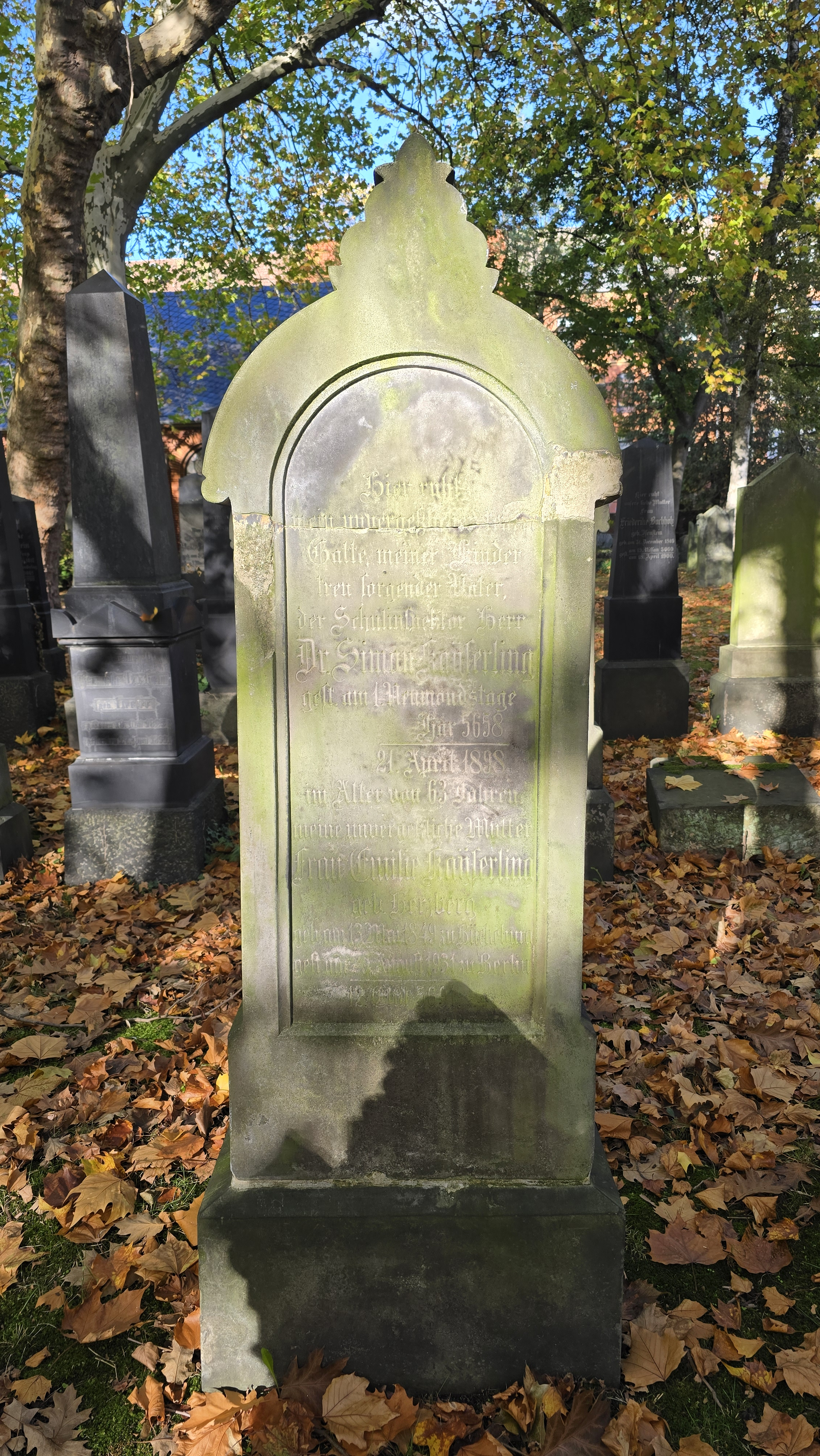
Gravestone on the Jewish Cemetery An der Strangriede in Hanover

Simon Kayserling (Simon Abrahm Kayserling) was a German educator and writer; born at Hanover on 31 August 1834; died there 22 April 1898; brother of Meyer Kayserling. He attended the Talmud school in Würzburg and the University of Berlin. He was the principal teacher and inspector of the M. M. David'sche Freischule from 1861, and taught for several years in the Jewish teachers' seminary in Hanover.

Approached by J. J. Benjamin, who acted as a publisher, Kayserling translated into German from the Hebrew original, also using a previous French translation along with corrections by Polish historian Joachim Lelewel, Rabbi Nathan Nata Hanover's Yawen Mezulah (Yeṿen metsulah; Hanover, 1863), an account of the Polish-Cossack war and the sufferings of the Jews in Poland during the period 1648-53. He also translated F. D. Mocatta's The Jews of Spain and Portugal and the Inquisition (ib. 1878).
