= Christopher Columbus and the Participation of the Jews in the Spanish and Portuguese Discoveries =

Christopher Columbus and the Participation of the Jews in the Spanish and Portuguese Discoveries is a scholarly work by Meyer Kayserling, translated into English and published in 1894. In it, Keyserling reports on an extensive search of Spanish archives including those at Alcalá de Henares, Barcelona, Madrid, and Seville. His research showed that marranos, who attempted to shield themselves and their families from the antisemitic violence of the Spanish Inquisition by outwardly professing Christianity, were an integral part of the European colonization of the Americas. Keyserling's discovery of evidence that Luis de Torres, who sailed with Columbus in 1492, was a marrano is memorialized in the naming of Luis de Torres Synagogue in the Bahamas.
