= Luis de Torres Synagogue =

Former Reform synagogue in the Bahamas

Freeport Hebrew Congregation
- Location of the former synagogue in the Bahamas

Religion
- Affiliation: Reform Judaism (former)
- Rite: Sephardi
- Ecclesiastical or organisational status: Synagogue (1972–2021)
- Status: Abandoned

Location
- Location: East Sunrise Highway, Freeport
- Country: Bahamas
- Coordinates: 26°31′01″N 78°40′53″W

Architecture
- Completed: 1972

The Freeport Hebrew Congregation is a former Reform Jewish congregation and synagogue, that was located in Freeport, in the Bahamas. Completed in 1972, the synagogue closed in 2021, with its demise attributed to the COVID-19 pandemic. It was the only synagogue in the Bahamas.

== History ==
The synagogue is named after Luis de Torres, identified by Meyer Kayserling's 1894 book Christopher Columbus and the participation of the Jews in the Spanish and Portuguese discoveries as a Sephardic Jew who sailed with Christopher Columbus as his interpreter at the beginning of the European colonization of the Americas. He is thought to have been the first Jew to have arrived in the New World, having arrived in 1492.

The former synagogue is situated on East Sunrise Highway, between the Lutheran Church and the Roman Catholic "Mary Star of the Sea.". The building previously belonged to a bank, who reclaimed the building after the synagogue's closure. The building is described as having a "white stucco facade". The synagogue functioned from 1972 to 2021, when it shut down because many members (mostly non-nationals) left because of the COVID-19 pandemic. In 2022, the Jewish population of the city was around 200.

The Bahamas also has a walled-off Jewish section of the cemetery in Nassau on New Providence Island. In addition, there is a Chabad in the Baha Mar resort in the Cable Beach area of the island who have a minyan on Shabbat. Furthermore, there is a Jewish school named the Samantha and Sarah Nadal Hebrew School.

== See also ==
- History of the Jews in the Bahamas
- History of the Jews in Latin America and the Caribbean
- List of synagogues in the Bahamas
