= Jetty Wohllerner =

Galician Jewish writer

- Born: Jetty Kehlmann; 1813; Lemberg, Galicia, Austrian Empire
- Died: 1891 (aged 77–78); Lemberg, Galicia, Austria-Hungary
- Writing career
- Language: Hebrew

Jetty Wohllerner (Yiddish: יענטא וואָהללערנער; 1813–1891) was a Galician Jewish writer.

== Biography ==
Jetty Wohllerner was born in Lemberg into a poor Jewish family. At the age of eight, after having passed her examination in primary instruction, she was taken by her father, Michael Kehlmann, into his office as an accountant. She meanwhile attended the Hebrew lessons given to her brothers, and in her spare moments read the Bible in Hebrew. Inspired by the Hebrew writings of Anna Maria van Schurman, and she persuaded her father to hire a Hebrew teacher for her. The Polish physician Goldschmied, then a student at Lemberg, was entrusted with her Hebrew education.

At the age of fourteen she was betrothed to L. Rosanes of Brody, and carried on a correspondence in Hebrew with him. Her fiancé died, however; and she was married several years later to Samson Wohllerner.

Wohllerner published Hebrew poems and essays in various maskilic journals. The greater portion of her correspondence, noteworthy for its style and purity of language, was published in Kokhevei Yitzḥak and Ha-Boker Or, while two letters, one to Meyer Kayserling and one to Goldschmied, are found in Otzar ha-Sifrut.
