= Zygmunt Klukowski =

Polish physician, historian, and bibliophile

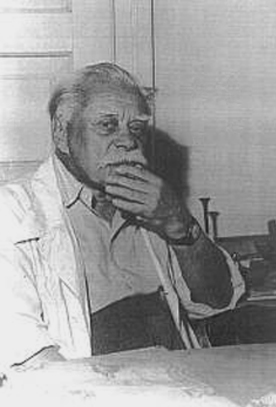
- Doctor Klukowski in his office
- Born: January 25, 1885; Odessa, Russian Empire
- Died: November 23, 1959 (aged 74); Szczebrzeszyn, Polish People's Republic
- Occupation: Medical doctor
- Known for: Journal from the Years of Occupation
- Awards: Silver Laurel of the Polska Akademia Literatury (1937), Gold Cross of Merit (1937, 1948), Order of Polonia Restituta (1958)

Zygmunt Klukowski (25 January 1885 – 23 November 1959) was a Polish physician, historian, and bibliophile. Born in 1885 in Odessa, he spent much of his life in Szczebrzeszyn. During World War II, he served in occupied Poland as officer of the underground resistance organizations, including Związek Walki Zbrojnej, and Armia Krajowa.

In the interwar Poland Klukowski was the editor-in-chief of two magazines, Teka Zamojska and Kwartalnik Regionalny in Zamość. Following World War II, he wrote two nominal works about his experiences, the Journal from the Years of Occupation of Zamojszczyzna, 1939–44 (Polish: Dziennik z lat okupacji Zamojszczyzny 1939–1944), a detailed account of his experiences as medical doctor in the General Government territory of occupied Poland during World War II, as well as the Red Shadow: A Physician's Memoir of the Soviet Occupation of Eastern Poland, 1944–1956. These accounts were not published in English until 1993 and 1997 respectively. Only recently Klukowski has gained international recognition as an important primary witness and chronicler of the World War Two period in Polish historiography. His descriptions of life under the Nazis are cited extensively by Richard J. Evans in The Third Reich at War, among other historians.

== Publications (1925–2007) ==
- Organizacja pomocy lekarskiej dla włościan w Ordynacji Nieświeskiej książąt Radziwiłłów w pierwszej połowie XIX wieku, Poznań 1925.
- Lekarze jako dowódcy oddziałów powstańczych w 1863 roku, Warsaw 1926.
- Lekarze w powstaniu 1863 r. polegli w boju, zamordowani i straceni z wyroków sądu (Lecture, 15 July 1925, Warsaw, II Zjazd Historyków Medycyny), Poznań 1926.
- Opis dżumy w Lublinie w roku 1625, Poznań 1926.
- Dawne Szkoły im. Zamoyskich w Szczebrzeszynie 1811–1852, Zamość 1927.
- Instrukcja dla lekarzy polowych w powstaniu 1863 roku, Warsaw 1937.
- Dzieje Fundacji Szkolnej im. Zamoyskich w Zamościu i Szczebrzeszynie, „Teka Zamojska” z 1938 nr 3.
- Pieśni oddziałów partyzanckich Zamojszczyzny (pen-name „Podwiński”), 1944.
- Terror niemiecki w Zamojszczyźnie 1939–1944, Zamość 1945.
- Wysiedlenie Szczebrzeszyna i utworzenie gminy niemieckiej, Zamość 1945.
- Niemcy i Zamojszczyzna 1939–1944, Zamość 1946.
- Zamojszczyzna w walce z Niemcami 1939–1944, Zamość 1946.
- Dywersja w Zamojszczyźnie 1939–1944, Zamość 1947.
- The evictions of Poles by the Germans from the Zamosc area. German Crimes in Poland, Warsaw 1947.
- Dziennik z lat okupacji Zamojszczyzny 1939–1944, Lublin 1958, 1959.
- Dziennik 1944–1955, Lublin 1990.
- Walki oddziałów ZWZ – AK i BCH Inspektoratu Zamojskiego w latach wojny 1939–1944, t. II (coauthors: A. Glińska i J. Jóźwiakowski), Lublin 1990.
- W przyfrontowym miasteczku, „Tygodnik Zamojski”, 1990 nr 41.
- Zamojszczyzna I. 1918–1943, II. 1944–1953, Wydawnictwo KARTA, Warsaw 2007.

== See also ==
- Ethnic cleansing of Zamojszczyzna by Nazi Germany
