= Rodrigo de Jerez =

Spanish explorer

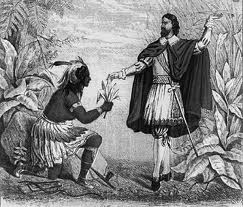
Rodrigo de Jerez

Rodrigo de Jerez was one of the Spanish crewmen who sailed to the Americas on the Santa Maria as part of Christopher Columbus's first voyage across the Atlantic Ocean in 1492. He was born in Ayamonte, a small city in the southwest of Spain. He is credited with being the first European smoker.

On 12 October 1492, the crew first encountered tobacco at San Salvador island in the Bahamas, known to the natives as Guanahani. The natives presented them with apparently valuable "dry leaves that spread a peculiar fragrance". The crew later discarded the leaves.

In November 1492, Jerez and Luis de Torres first observed natives smoking. They were searching for the Emperor of China, Hongzhi Emperor, in Cuba. Apparently, the natives made rolls of palm and mais leaves "in the manner of a musket formed of paper" with tobacco on the inside. One would light one side and "drink" the smoke out of the other.

Jerez picked up the tobacco smoking habit. When he returned to Europe in the Niña, he introduced the habit to his home town, Ayamonte. The smoke surrounding him frightened his neighbours: the Spanish Inquisition imprisoned him for his "sinful and infernal" habits, because "only Devil could give a man the power to exhale smoke from his mouth". When he was released seven years later, smoking tobacco had caught on.
