= Leon Bibel =

American painter

- Born: 1913
- Died: 1995 (aged 81–82)

Leon Bibel (1913–1995) was a Polish-born American painter and printmaker during the Great Depression. His themes were the social condition of workers and the politics of protest and war, although cityscapes and landscapes were included among his works. He later developed works in wood of especially Jewish themes. These included fanciful miniature buildings influenced by European spice boxes, figures and objects within shadow boxes, and in one case a synagogue ark, which still stands at Congregation B'nai Tikvah in North Brunswick, NJ, along with a Tallit holder he created and several other items.

Leon Bibel was born in Poland, growing up in the shtetl of Szczebrzeszyn. He immigrated to the United States with his family. After graduating from Polytechnic High School in San Francisco, he trained at the California School of Fine Arts and apprenticed under the German Impressionist Maria Riedelstein and assisted Bernard Zakheim (a student of Diego Rivera), on the frescoes of the San Francisco Jewish Community Center and the University of California at San Francisco's Toland Hall. He resided in New York beginning in 1936 as a WPA artist of the Federal Art Project at the Harlem Community Art Center in New York City. He also taught art at both P.S. 94 and Bronx House. At the start of the Second World War, he and a number of other New York artists moved to South Brunswick, New Jersey, to make a living as chicken farmers. By the 1960s, Bibel returned to art, focusing on wood-based sculptures. He died in 1995.

He was a friend and neighbor of the American sculptor George Segal, and was both an anonymous and named character of Segal's arrays and portraits. (He is the first man in Depression Bread Line, Segal's group of bronzed figures at the FDR Memorial, included in PBS’s "George Segal: American Still Life").

== Holdings and exhibitions ==
Bibel's work may be found at Metropolitan Museum of Art, the Museum of Fine Arts, Boston, the B'nai Brith's Klutznick Museum, and the museums of Rutgers University and Princeton Universities.

Bibel's work has been featured in posthumous exhibitions in Philadelphia in 2011 and in Virginia in 2013.
