= Luis de Torres =

Spanish interpreter

- Born: Yosef ben HaLevi HaIvri; Moguer, Spain
- Died: 1493; La Navidad, Hispaniola
- Occupation: Interpreter
- Known for: First Jewish person in the Americas

Luis de Torres (died 1493) was Christopher Columbus's interpreter on his first voyage to America. He was the first Jewish person to set foot in the Americas.

== Early life ==
De Torres was a converso, a Jewish person who was forced to convert to Christianity or be put to death according to the Spanish Inquisition. He was born Yosef ben HaLevi HaIvri in Moguer, Spain.

== Expedition to the Americas ==
De Torres was chosen by Columbus for his knowledge of Hebrew, Chaldaic, and Arabic; Columbus believed he would find the descendants of the Lost Tribes of Israel. On August 3, 1492, the voyage set out, only a day after the Edict of Expulsion that forced Spanish Jews to leave the country. After arriving at modern-day Cuba, de Torres became the first Jewish person in the Americas.

Columbus sent de Torres and the sailor Rodrigo de Jerez on an expedition inland on November 2, 1492. Their task was to explore the country, contact its ruler, and gather information about the Asian emperor described by Marco Polo as the "Great Khan". The two men were received with great honors in a village of around 1,000 inhabitants, and returned four days later. They reported on the native custom of drying leaves, inserting them in cane pipes, burning them, and inhaling the smoke: a reference to the use of tobacco.

When Columbus set off for Spain on January 4, 1493, Luis de Torres was among the 39 men who stayed behind at the settlement of La Navidad founded on the island of Hispaniola. Coming back by the end of that year, Columbus learnt that the whole garrison had been wiped out by internal strife and by attack.

== Legacy ==
From 1972 to 2021, a synagogue in The Bahamas existed that was named after de Torres, known as the Luis de Torres Synagogue. The synagogue was named after him due to his involvement in Columbus voyage to what Europeans called the New World.
