= Nathan ben Moses Hannover =

Jewish historian

Nathan Nata ben Moses Hannover (Hebrew: נתן נטע הנובר) was a Ruthenian Jewish historian, Talmudist, and Kabbalist.

== Biography ==
Hannover lived at Zaslav, Volhynia, and when that town was attacked by the Cossacks he fled to Prague and eventually Venice, where he studied Kabbalah under Rabbis Chaim HaKohen, Moses Zacuto as well as Rabbi Samuel Aboab. Later, he became rabbi of Iași, Moldavia, and afterward, according to Jacob Aboab, he returned to Italy.

He died, according to Leopold Zunz (Kalender, 5623, p. 18), in Uherský Brod, Moravia, on 14 July 1663. Jacob Aboab, however, in a letter to Theophil Unger (Wolf, Bibl. Hebr. iii., No. 1728), gives Piove di Sacco, Italy, as the place of Hannover's death, without indicating the date. The place of his birth is equally uncertain. According to Graziadio Nepi-Mordecai Ghirondi (Toledot Gedole Yisrael, p. 270), he was born at Kraków, but Steinschneider claims that "Nathan Hannover" and "Nathan of Kraków" were two different individuals.

== Yeven Mezulah ==
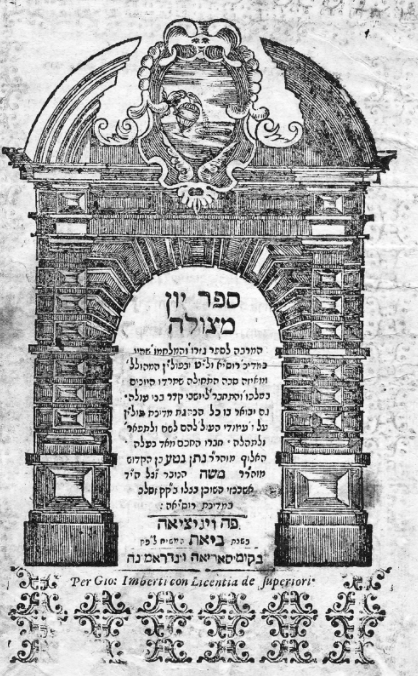
Title page: "Book Depth of Mire", original 1653 edition

Hannover is chiefly known for his work entitled Yeven Mezulah (Hebrew: יון מצולה, Venice, 1653; translated into English as Abyss of Despair in 1950). It describes the course of the Khmelnytsky Uprising in the Polish–Lithuanian Commonwealth from a Jewish perspective. Hannover in this work gives a brief description of the Polish Crown of the time and of the relations between the Poles, Jews and Cossacks, and the causes which led to the uprising. He also gives a very vivid picture of Jewish life in Poland and the yeshivot. This work, owing to its literary value, was translated into Yiddish (1687), into German (1720), and into French by Daniel Levy (published by Benjamin II, Tlemçen, 1855). This last translation was revised by the historian J. Lelewel, and served as a basis for Meyer Kayserling's German translation (also published by Benjamin II, Hanover, 1863). Kostomarov, utilizing Salomon Mandelkern's Russian translation, gives many extracts from it in his Bogdan Chmielnicki (iii. 283-306).

In the late 20th century historians began to dispute the numbers given in Yeven Mezulah. They claim it overstates Jewish casualties during the Bohdan Khmelnytsky rebellion in 1648 and 1649. These authors question it as a reliable historical source in spite of its literary qualities. Yeven Mezulah was criticized in particular by Shaul Stampfer, Edward Fram, Paul Robert Magocsi's "Ukraine: A History", and Petro Mirchuk.

== Other works ==
Hannover's other works are:

- Ṭa'ame Sukkah, a homiletic explanation of the Feast of Tabernacles (Amsterdam, 1652)
- Safah Berurah, a dictionary of the Hebrew, German, Italian, and Latin languages, and arranged in Hebrew alphabetical order (Prague, 1660) – in a second edition, by Jacob Koppel ben Wolf (Amsterdam, 1701), French was included
- Sha'are Ẓiyyon, a collection of mystical prayers, religious customs, and ascetic reflections; it was taken chiefly from cabalistic works, and was very popular among the Eastern Jews. It appeared first in Prague in 1662, and enjoyed such popularity that it was several times reedited (see Benjacob, Oẓar ha-Sefarim, p. 604).
- Reference is also made by Hannover in his books to the following three unpublished works:
  - Neṭa' Sha'ashu'im, homilies on the Pentateuch
  - Neṭa' Ne'eman, a cabalistic work
  - A commentary on the Otiyyot de R. Aḳiba.

== Jewish Encyclopedia bibliography ==
- Hannover, Sha'are Ẓiyyon, Preface;
- Moritz Steinschneider, Cat. Bodl. cols. 2044-2047;
- Julius Fürst, Bibl. Jud. i. 361.
