= Khmelnytsky pogroms =

17th-century Jewish pogroms in Ukraine

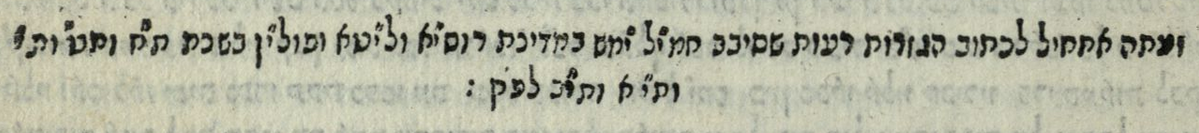
The original edition of "Abyss of Despair" by Nathan ben Moses Hannover, 1653: "Now I shall begin to record the brutal oppressions caused by Chmiel in the lands of Russia, Lithuania and Poland in the years [5]'408, '409, '410, '411, '412 according to the minor reckoning."

The Khmelnytsky pogroms were pogroms carried out against the Jews of modern Ukraine during the 1648 Khmelnytsky Uprising of the Cossacks and serfs led by Bogdan Khmelnytsky against the Polish–Lithuanian Commonwealth. Khmelnytsky appears prominently in Jewish accounts such as the "Abyss of Despair", though the worst of the violence was actually committed under his subcommander Maksym Kryvonis.

Massacres of the Jews of Poland, Belarus, and today's Ukraine occurred throughout the rebellion, which lasted for many years, as well as during the Russo-Polish War (1654-1667) and a smaller northern war with the Swedish Empire that ignited the riots. Nevertheless, the sudden destruction of many communities from the beginning of April to May 1648 until the cessation of the Cossacks' progress in November, during the war's first year, is the source of the name. According to the historian Adam Teller: "In the Jewish collective memory, it is the events of the summer and fall of 1648 that characterize the uprising as a whole". Therefore in Hebrew and Yiddish, these events became known as Gzeyres Takh Vetat (גזירות ת״ח ות״ט), meaning the "[evil] decrees of 5408–9" of the Hebrew calendar (of 1648–1649).

Thousands were slaughtered or died of starvation and epidemics, and many others fled, were sold into slavery, or converted. The number of Jews killed by the Cossack rebels in 1648 was estimated at several thousand to 20,000. It is estimated that all the parties – the Cossacks, the Russians, the Swedes, their allies, and the Poles themselves, who massacred Jews on suspicion of collaborating with the invaders – killed between 40,000 and 50,000 Jews in total over this period.

== Background ==
In 1569, with the establishment of the Polish–Lithuanian Commonwealth, large tracts of today's Ukraine were transferred from the Grand Duchy of Lithuania to the rule of the Kingdom of Poland. The aristocracy, which enjoyed independence and even chose the king, controlled the area that had been ruled until then by the Tatars from the Crimea. In the territories west of the Dnieper River, tens of thousands of people throughout the Polish–Lithuanian Commonwealth came to settle. The great Magnates, most of whom were descendants of the local aristocracy, established vast agricultural estates and imposed strict rules on the local Ruthenian peasants.

Among the settlers were many Jews. They had been pushed from Poland, itself under the pressure of city residents who wanted to eliminate their economic competition. Many of the Jews were employed by the nobility as lessees and estate managers. Dozens of new communities were established in Ukraine, mainly on the right bank (western area) of the Dnieper.

The eastern side was a somewhat wild area. It was closer to the Crimea and dangerous for settlement, although some estates and cities there drew Jews looking for jobs. South of the river bend lived the Cossacks from the Zaporozhian Sich, a semi-nomadic society that maintained a routine of constant fighting with the Tatars. The Polish–Lithuanian Commonwealth had strained relations with the Cossacks and tried to subordinate them to its authority while exploiting them for military use.

The nobility mercilessly brutalized the general population, especially the serfs. The economic and social tension, which also led to strong hostility towards Jewish lessees, had worsened partially due to religious issues. At the end of the 16th century, in the framework of the counter-reformation, the Jesuits reached the area. Although they intended to fight any manifestation of Protestantism, they soon turned their attention to the Ruthenians, almost all of whom were Orthodox Christians. King Sigismund III was a devout Catholic, as were most of the Polish nobles. Under these pressures, many of the Ruthenian nobles converted to Catholicism. Similar attempts, which were also expressed in establishing a local Uniate church and the persecution of Orthodox priests who refused to join it, were made with the common people. The locals' rage against all this was quickly channeled into acts of rebellion led by the Cossacks, who were experienced fighters and who had rebelled eight times between 1592 and 1638.

In the 19th century, with the rise of Ukrainian nationalism, many historians tried to characterize these rebellions as conflict between a local Ruthenian independence movement against foreign Polish nobility and its Jewish servants. The great Magnates in the region were, in fact, mostly Catholics or Uniates, but they were descendants of the original inhabitants, such as the Ostrogski family. The Voivode Jeremi Wiśniowiecki (the Vishnotzky Duke of the book "The Abyss of Despair (Yeven Metzulah)", in Hebrew: יוֵן מְצוּלָה) was the son of a well-known Eastern Orthodox family who converted to Catholicism at the age of 20.

There are also reports of cooperation between Jews and locals against the nobility and the Jews' participation in Cossack raids. Like all the townspeople in the area, the Jews were obligated to participate in defending their towns in case of a siege. In the East Bank, many were obliged to carry weapons in case of Tatar attacks.

== Events ==
=== Outbreak of the Uprising ===
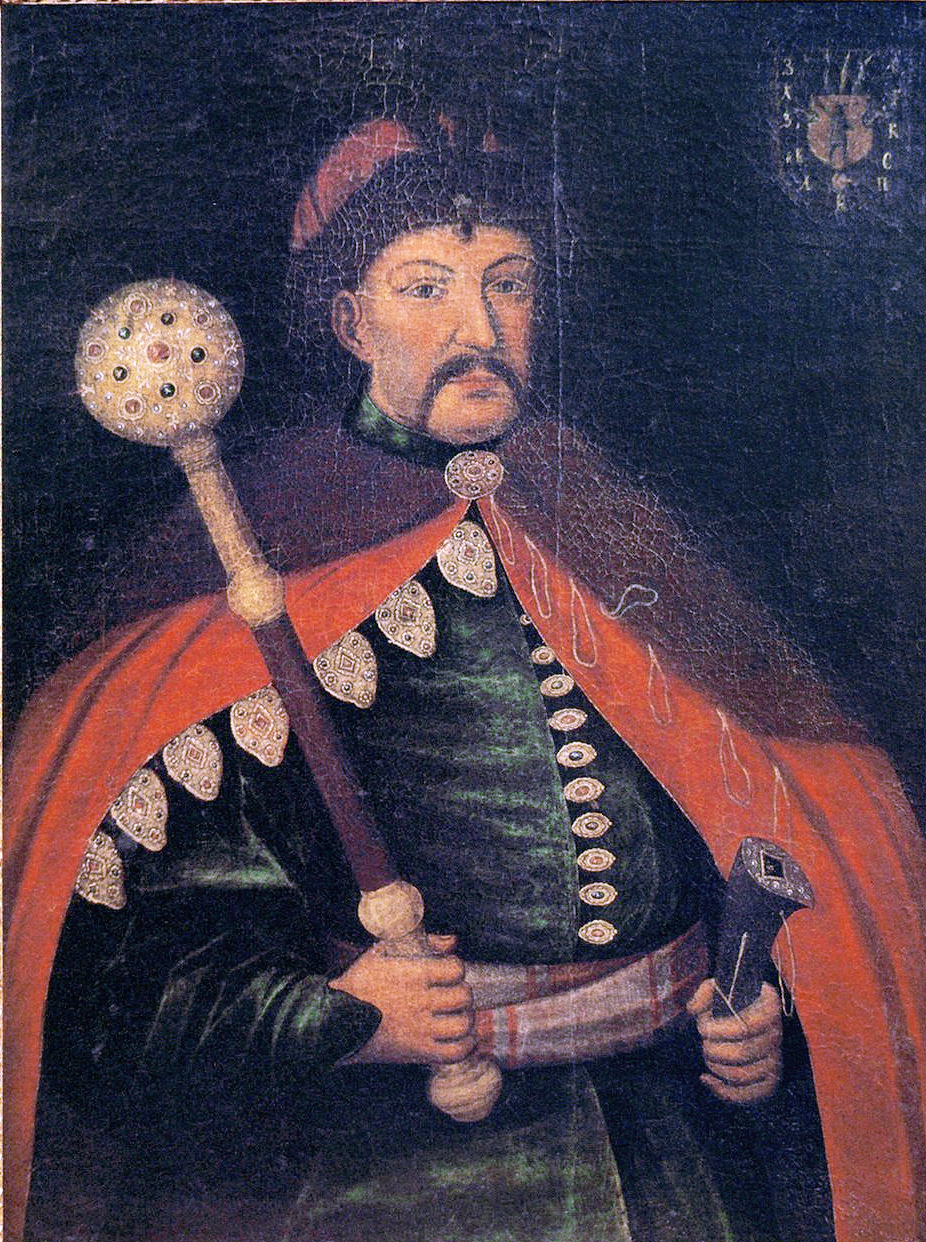
Bohdan Khmelnytsky

One of the victims of the landowners was a local junior nobleman named Bogdan Khmelnytsky. In early 1647, his property and his intended fiancé were taken (and according to a single report, his ten-year-old son was murdered) by Daniel Czaplinski, apparently the deputy of the magnate Alexander Koniecpolski. When Khmelnytsky received no response from the courts, a great rebellion began to develop, one which was much larger than the previous ones.

In the spring of 1648, Khmelnytsky, who was appointed to be the Ataman of Zaporozhians, led an army of Cossacks against the Polish–Lithuanian Commonwealth. He made an alliance with the Tatars, who provided him with 4,000 cavalry under the command of Tugai Bey. In April he crossed the Dnieper with his army and won two crushing victories against the crown forces, one at Zhovti Vody on May 15 and the other in Korsuń on the 26th.

The news of his victories sparked a huge uprising among the people throughout the country in which the Cossacks and the masses massacred Jews, nobles, Catholics, and Uniates. The disturbances spread to the southern portion of today's Belarus as Cossack troops reached Pinsk. The eastern bank of the Dnieper, where the population was almost entirely Orthodox and the Polish–Lithuanian Commonwealth's presence was weak, fell without a real struggle.

The following day after the victory in Korsuń, on the first day of Shavuot, a Jewish holiday, on May 27, 1648, began a mass deportation of the Jews in the surrounding districts to the fortified cities, desecrating the holiday. About the same time, Jeremi Wiśniowiecki withdrew from his estates in Lubny with his own army and took with him several hundred Jews along with other refugees. He kept gathering Jewish people on the way.

Nathan ben Moses Hannover, whose book " The Abyss of Despair (Yeven Metzulah) " is the best-known chronicle of events, described what he heard about the riots in the eastern bank that fell into the hands of the rebels:

"many communities beyond the Dnieper, and close to the battle field, such as Pereyaslaw, Baryszowka, Piratyn, and Boryspole, Lubin and Lachowce and their neighbors, who were unable to escape, perished for the sanctification of His Name. These persons died cruel and bitter deaths. Some were skinned alive and their flesh was thrown to the dogs; some had their hands and limbs chopped off, and their bodies thrown on the highway only to be trampled by wagons and crushed by horses; some had wounds inflicted upon them, and thrown on the street to die a slow death; they writhed in their blood until they breathed their last; others were buried alive. The enemy slaughtered infants in the laps of their mothers. They were sliced into pieces like fish. They slashed the bellies of pregnant women, removed their infants and tossed them in their faces. Some women had their bellies torn open and live cats placed in them. The bellies were then sewed up with the living cats remaining within. They chopped off the hands of the victims so that they would not be able to remove the cats from the bellies. The infants were hung on the breasts of their mothers. Some children were pierced with spears, roasted on the fire and then brought to their mothers to be eaten. Many times they used the bodies of Jewish children as improvised bridges upon which they later crossed. There was no cruel device of murder in the whole world that was not perpetrated by the enemies."

— Nathan ben Moses Hannover, The Abyss of Despair (Yeven Metzulah), chapter IV

On the first day of June, Khmelnytsky's main camp was stopped at Bila Tserkva and ceased moving westward. Yet, the masses in the territories that remained under the Polish–Lithuanian Commonwealth control continued to rebel. Some Cossack atamans, with the most dominant of them all, Maksym Kryvonis, used their forces to support the acts of rebellion. On the tenth of June, 1648, Kryvonis conquered the city of Nemyriv, where a large Jewish population had fortified. According to Hanover and other record-writers, he pretended to be a friendly force and flew flags of the Crown Army, while Cossack sources reported from inside. As soon as Nemyriv fell, the Cossacks slaughtered all the Catholics and the Jews inside. Hanover reported 6,000 Jews killed, an improbable number which was denied by modern historians but still provides a measure of destruction. Mordechai Nadav noted that events of the size of that in Pinsk, in which several dozen Jews were apparently killed during the invasion, were more typical of the events.

Similar massacres took place in many other cities, such as Polonne and Bar. In Nemyriv, Jewish historians reported a mass refusal of Jews to convert to Christianity and be saved, although at the same time the Shakh (Shabbatai ben Meir HaKohen) wrote that "many Jews violated the covenant." A group of Jews who swore allegiance to the Cossacks and converted to Christianity rescued itself from the city after a short time when Nemyriv fell into the hands of Vishniewitzky.

On June 18, Kryvonis began a siege of Tulchyn and broke through the wall on the 21st. The next day the fort fell. Following a pause of several days on June 26 the massacre took place.

Hannover and others argued that the local commander, Duke Janusz Chetvartinsky, betrayed the Jews and gave them to the rioters while trying in vain to save his own life. Israel Halperin determined that there was no evidence of this and Chturtinsky probably tried to release all those who were inside by means of a bribe, but the Cossacks killed them all. He believed that the source of the rumor was because Cheturtinsky belonged to a devout Orthodox family and that is why the Catholics suspected him.

Hannover noted that Jews were also offered the opportunity to convert to Christianity, but rejected it and chose death for the sanctification of God's name. The historian Yechezkel Feram rejected Hannover's account and claimed that Hannover relied on another person's testimony. Feram believed that the description was a distortion of the story "cliff of the times" about a similar sanction in Hommel that took place at the same time, on 20 June 1648. Meir Meshbreshin reported that several rabbis urged the people to surrender and not to convert, and all of them were slaughtered, but this event is doubted as well.

In September the noble armies suffered a heavy defeat in the Battle of Pyliavtsi, leaving no significant force to counter Khmelnytsky until Warsaw itself. Khmelnytsky advanced toward Lviv and Zamość. In Lviv, the city's residents were offered the opportunity to expel the Jews in return for lifting the siege, but they refused. As in all other cities, the Jews took part in its defense. At the end of November, fearing a prolonged battle in the winter and after the new Polish-Lithuanian king offered him extensive concessions, Khmelnytsky retreated to Kiev.

The fighting resumed at the end of May 1649 and continued intermittently for years to come. Large-scale killings were carried out against the Ukrainian Jews and the parts of Belarus that fell into the hands of the rebels. The number of people who converted to Christianity was large enough that on 2 May 1650, King Jan Kazimierz issued a special order that allowed all those who wished it to return to Judaism. Still, amidst this chaos, many of them kept their new religion even after the plunder of their homes by the crown's faithful soldiers.

Many were captured by the Tatars. Among the Jews, it was thought that the Tatars were interested in any Jew in order to sell them in slavery markets. However, they often wanted only slaves who would provide a worthwhile price. These included young women, men of working age and children. There were cases in which the Ruthenian masses rejected the attempts to sell them slaves who were not included among these classifications. It was also reported that the elderly and other non-wanted slaves were separated from the captured prisoners and burned alive so that they would not burden the caravans.

However, the Tatars did not take part in the massacres at Tulchyn and Nemyriv; these were the work of Kryvonis. The Cossacks themselves did not take slaves but killed those who fell into their hands. The Jewish communities joined forces in the efforts to redeem the Jewish slaves, which were located mainly in the large market in Constantinople. Large donations were made throughout the Jewish world: a special tax was imposed by the Council of Four Lands in areas not affected by the revolt, the Karaites in the Ottoman capital raised donations, and the main help came from a slavery-redeeming company in Venice whose emissaries came as far as Hamburg and Amsterdam to request charity. With these funds and its official delegate, the community of Constantinople redeemed 1,500 people by July 1651, in exchange for a total amount of 150,000 Spanish reals. The stream then decreased and in total there were 2,000 redeemed people in 1648, some in distant markets such as Persia and Algiers.

The number of Jewish victims was evaluated as great. Samuel Ben-Nathan Feidel, in his book from 1650, counted 281 communities destroyed and claimed that six hundred thousand Jews were killed. Shakh on the other hand noted that there were one thousand. Menashe Ben Israel wrote to Oliver Cromwell that there were one hundred and eighty thousand. Although in the 20th century, Isaac Schifer estimated that there were three hundred thousand killed or taken prisoner from 1648 to 1655. Modern research has greatly reduced estimates of the victims of the massacres: Professor Shmuel Ettinger estimated the entire Jewish population of Ukraine in 1648 at 51,325 persons, based on documents from that period. Prof. Shaul Stampfer claimed that there were 40,000, stating that "at most 50% (20,000) and perhaps much less" than those who died at the outbreak of the revolt in 1648.

There is limited evidence of Jews dying al kiddush Hashem (martyrdom for the sanctification of God's name) during the Khmelnytsky pogroms, in contrast to the extensive testimonies from the Rhineland massacres (known in Hebrew as the Gezerot Tatnu) which occurred approximately 500 years earlier. Scholars have proposed various explanations for this discrepancy. Jacob Katz argued that Jewish halakhic (legal) attitudes had undergone a transformation: whereas during the Gezerot Tatnu martyrdom was praised and even idealized, by the time of the Khmelnytsky pogroms, halakhic thinking had reinterpreted kiddush Hashem in more spiritual and symbolic terms, rather than as a physical imperative. In contrast, Edward Fram contended that the halakhic evolution was not the decisive factor. Rather, he emphasized the differing nature of the persecutions: the earlier massacres were religiously motivated, and Jews could often save themselves by converting to Christianity, thereby framing martyrdom as a conscious religious choice. The Khmelnytsky pogroms, however, were driven primarily by political and social unrest, and conversion was generally not presented as an option. Consequently, instances in which Jews were forced to choose between conversion and death were rare, and thus there are fewer recorded cases of martyrdom during this period.

=== Concluding phase ===
In 1654 the Tsardom of Russia gave suzerainty to Khmelnytsky and their armies invaded together into the Polish–Lithuanian Commonwealth, both in Ukraine and in the north, in Belarus and Lithuania. At the beginning of August 1655, Vilnius fell into the hands of the occupier and mass slaughter was carried out, although the reports showed that most of the Jews had managed to escape in time. In October, Lublin was captured, where the chronicles cite about 2,000 Jews who were murdered. It was the greatest disaster of the new battle. The historian Dov Weinryb, based both on Polish records and on personal reports, stated that the correct number was probably several hundred. The Russians also tended to take many prisoners, and a new wave of Jewish slaves reached the markets in 1665 and 1656. Once again, a great effort began to raise funds for their redemption.

In the summer of 1655 a new enemy to the republic, the Swedish Empire led by King Carl Gustav, invaded. This war was the most destructive of all the struggles between Poland and Lithuania. It is still estimated to be worse than World War II in terms of the relative damage caused to the country. In what became known as the "Swedish Flood," the most affluent and populated areas of Poland were completely destroyed. The circumstances led to great hunger that year. Jewish reports portrayed the invaders as sympathetic towards them. Although they did not take special action against them except for a random killing, many Jews, together with the rest of the people, died of starvation, epidemics and sword. For example, the Jewish quarter of Kazimierz in Kraków was completely destroyed by the siege on the city in September–October 1655 and the survivors fled to Bohemia and Moravia.

The Polish–Lithuanian Commonwealth was almost collapsing: Many nobles believed that Karl Gustav would do them good and changed sides with their armies. The magnate Janusz Radziwiłł swore allegiance in return for protection from the Russians and severed Lithuania from the Polish–Lithuanian Commonwealth.

But the scales were tipped by the massacres and looting of the Swedes, and especially by the awakening of Catholic sentiment with the successful defense of the Jasna Góra Monastery of Częstochowa. The Piłsudski (a family of nobility that originated in the Grand Duchy of Lithuania and increased in notability under the Polish–Lithuanian Commonwealth and the Second Polish Republic) began to resent the Swedish king, who neglected their affairs, and most of them renewed their loyalty to Jan Kazimierz. The masses of the people and the minor nobility, headed by Hetman Stefan Czerniecki, launched a guerilla war against the Lutheran conquerors. In the fall of 1656, the Czar estimated that Sweden might become too strong and started supporting the King of Poland.

The rebels, driven also by the betrayal of the Calvinist Radziwiłł, ran what they perceived as a struggle for the Catholic Church. Lutherans, Calvinists, neo-Aryans, Orthodox and Jews were all marked as enemies and suspected of collaborating with the Swedes. Different militias and the Crown Forces massacred them frequently. On January 22, 1656, the king confiscated the remains of Kazimierz and gave all the looting that could be extracted from it to the army after declaring that the Jews had cooperated with the enemy. In February 1656, Czerniecki killed 600 Jews, according to the records, when he liberated Sandomierz Castle.

Poland, Lithuania and Sweden signed a peace agreement in 1660, and the fighting between the Polish–Lithuanian Commonwealth and Moscow resumed. It continued on a relatively limited scale until signing the Truce of Andrusovo Agreement in 1667, which brought tranquility to the kingdom for the first time in 19 years. The Lithuanian communities paid a large sum to include in the contract a clause allowing all Jewish prisoners in Russia, with the exception of converts and women who were married, to return home.

The historian Dov Weinryb wrote that according to records about the size of Jewish communities in the 1970s and 1980s, which together with other data indicate that many survived by conversion or immigration, "a reasonable estimate" of all Jews killed - by the sword, by all sides, and by epidemics and famine - during the turbulent period that swept Poland from 1648 to 1677, "will be between 40,000 and 50,000, although historians point to far larger estimates, which are high enough to include between a fifth and a quarter of the Jewish population In Poland and Lithuania on the eve of the uprising."

=== Aftermath ===
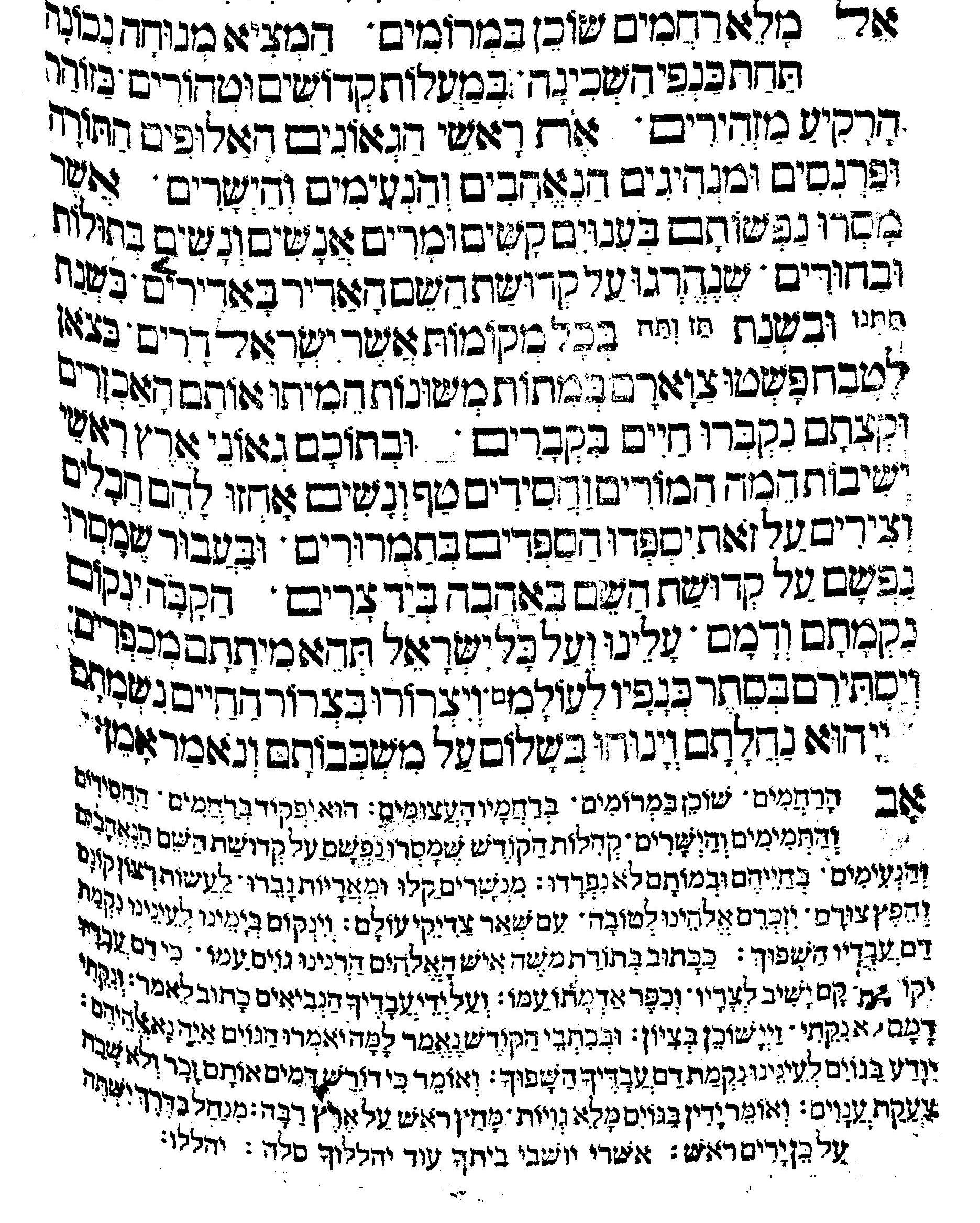
"El Maleh Rahamim" in memory of the victims of the massacres of 1096 and the massacres of the Cossack riots.

The chaos in Poland that followed the massacres brought the leaders of the communities and their rabbis to take steps regarding the welfare of the refugees, both in material aid and in halachic discussions to allow a second marriage to women considered agunah, whose husbands had been lost. The problem of women whose husbands had been lost reached distant courts in communities where captives were redeemed and wanted to remarry. In Cairo, in a case cited in the "Divrei Noam", a group of women sent a messenger to Poland who returned with divorce documents from all their husbands.

The generation who lived at that time debated the question of whether the massacres were part of a divine plan, either shedding clean blood for the sins of the House of Israel or else punishment from God. Many adopted the first statement, but pamphlets published in Europe blamed the Polish Jewry of committing sins such as loan interest, distribution of Kabbalah books to the masses, raising pigs for non-Jews, lawlessness and more. The massive flight to the west also led to the renewed growth of the Holy Roman Empire as an important Torah center, after years of standing in the shadow of its neighbor to the east.

Researchers in the past have frequently related the pogroms as a catalyst for the rise of Sabbateanism. Sarah, the wife of Shabtai Zvi, also became orphaned during it. Although this assertion lost its validity over time, Israel Halpern believed that the effort to raise funds for the redemption of captives throughout the continent hastened the horrific news of the events to the entire Diaspora and played an important role.

In memory of the heavy mourning, the rabbis banned banquets and fancy costumes. Wearing silk and velvet was forbidden for three years. Women were forbidden to wear gold chains and gems for three years. It was forbidden to sing songs of joy for one year, except for wedding ceremonies, and the authority was given by the leaders of each community to extend the validity of the prohibitions for additional years.

In February 1650 the Council of Four Lands assembled in Lublin, where it was declared that the Memorial Day for the sanctions in Blois and for the day that Nemyriv fell would be on 10 June 1648 (Twentieth of Sivan - a day from the Jewish calendar) in memory of the victims. Lamentations and special prayers were written to be said on this day. Rabbi Yom Tov Lipman Heller then corrected the lament of "Ella Ezekara in Third Tears" for those who perished. In addition, various versions of the prayer "El Malei Rachamim" (Jewish prayer for the soul of a person who has died, usually recited at the graveside during the burial service and at memorial services during the year) were also composed, to be recited on the 20th of Sivan, on Yom Kippur, on the Sabbath preceding Shavuot and on Shabbat Chazon.

Despite its many inaccuracies, "Abyss of Despair" has become a historical memory because of the high quality of Hannover's writing. It was published in more than twenty editions in several languages and remained a major source until the 20th century. The massacres of 1648 are mentioned in several literary works in Hebrew. The most famous of them are "The Slave" by Isaac Bashevis Singer, "The Nazarene" by Shalom Asch, "A City In Its Fullness" by SY Agnon and the ballad "The Rabbi's Daughter" by Shaul Tchernichovsky.

== See also ==
- History of the Jews in Ukraine

== Sources ==
- Shulvass, Moses Avigdor (1971). From East to West: the westward migration of Jews from eastern Europe during the seventeenth and eighteenth centuries. Detroit: Wayne State Univ. Press. ISBN 978-0-8143-1437-1.
- eteacherhebrew (8 January 2019). "Khmelnytsky Uprising. Guide, N. Haskin, G."
- Stampfer, Shaul (2003). "What Actually Happened to the Jews of Ukraine in 1648?". Jewish History. 17 (2): 207–227. doi:10.1023/A:1022330717763. JSTOR 20101498. S2CID 159092052.
- Nathans, Benjamin; Safran, Gabriella (2008). Culture front: Representing Jews in Eastern Europe. Jewish culture and contexts. Philadelphia, Pa: University of Pennsylvania press. p. 36. ISBN 978-0-8122-4055-9.
- Orest, Subtelny (2000). Ukraine - A History. University of Toronto Press. pp. 123–124. ISBN 978-0-8020-8390-6.
- Ettinger, Shmuel (1956). "Jewish Participation in the Colonization of the Ukraine (1569-1648)". Zion. כא. Historical Society of Israel: 107–142.
- Fram, Edward (1998). "Creating a tale of martyrdom in Tulczyn, 1648". Jewish History and Jewish Memory. Brandies University Press: 89–112.
- Ettinger, Shmuel (1994). ON THE HISTORY OF THE JEWS IN POLAND AND RUSSIA. Bialik Institute Publishing House. p. 124. ISBN 9789652270931.
- Frost, Robert I. (11 March 2004). After the Deluge: Poland-Lithuania and the Second Northern War, 1655-1660. Cambridge University Press. p. 54. ISBN 978-0-521-54402-3.
- Stone, Daniel (2001). The Polish-Lithuanian State, 1386-1795: Volume 4. University of Washington Press. p. 168. ISBN 9780295980935.
- Weinryb, Bernard D. (1973). The Jews of Poland: A Social and Economic History of the Jewish Community in Poland from 1100 to 1800. Jewish Publication Society. pp. 185–197, 317–318. ISBN 9780827600164.
