= Church of the Dormition of the Mother of God, Szczebrzeszyn =

Orthodox church in Szczebrzeszyn, Poland

Church of the Dormition of the Mother of God
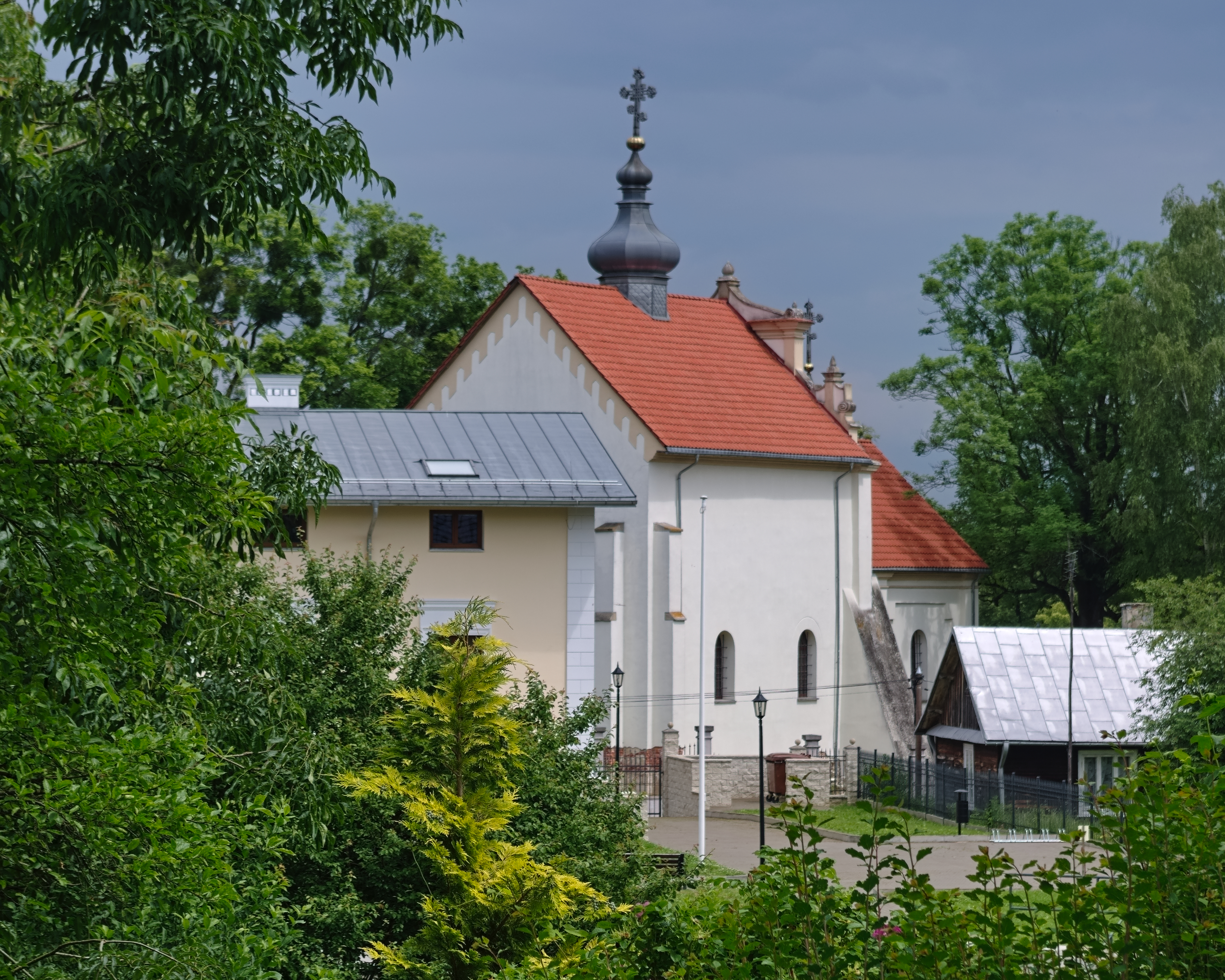
- View from the southwest
- Church of the Dormition of the Mother of God
- 50°41′40.4″N 22°58′35.4″E
- Location: Szczebrzeszyn
- Country: Poland
- Denomination: Eastern Orthodoxy
- Churchmanship: Polish Orthodox Church

History
- Status: active Orthodox church
- Dedication: Dormition of the Mother of God

Architecture
- Style: Renaissance
- Completed: c. 1560, 1710, 1808, 1868 and 1876

Specifications
- Materials: brick

Administration
- Diocese: Diocese of Lublin and Chełm

Church of the Dormition of the Mother of God is a Greek Orthodox filial church in Szczebrzeszyn. It belongs to the parish of Saint George in Biłgoraj, in the Zamość Deanery of the Diocese of Lublin and Chełm of the Polish Orthodox Church.

The building, in its current form, was erected in the 16th century on the foundations of an earlier church. It is possible that this earlier church was the first Catholic church of Saint Nicholas, funded around 1394 by Dymitr of Goraj, the then owner of Szczebrzeszyn. Andrzej Górka likely took over the church from the Catholics and transformed it into a Calvinist congregation. However, due to the small number of Protestants, the large church was no longer needed, and the Górka family handed it over to the Orthodox believers. At the same time, Andrzej and Stanisław Górka donated funds for the reconstruction of the church. For the first few decades of its existence as an Orthodox church, it later accepted Union of Brest after 1596. It remained under the jurisdiction of the Eparchy of Chełm–Belz until its abolition by the Russian authorities in 1875. During the period the church was under the Union, it was repeatedly renovated and rebuilt, losing the features of Eastern Christian sacred architecture. At the turn of the 18th and 19th centuries, Latin-style altars were placed inside the church, both the main and side altars, which were removed during the reconstruction between 1867 and 1870.

After the implementation of Tsar Nicholas II's Edict of Toleration, the majority of the parishioners, who had previously been forced to adopt Orthodoxy, converted back to the Roman Catholic Church. However, the church remained in use until 1915, when Russian officials and military personnel were stationed in the town. After Poland regained independence, the church was not reopened as only two people of the Orthodox faith remained in Szczebrzeszyn. In 1938, the church was on the list of those to be demolished as part of the reparation and polonization campaign, but after protests from the residents, its demolition was halted.

After World War II, the building passed into the ownership of the State Treasury. Initially used as a warehouse and then completely abandoned, it eventually fell into ruin. In 2006, the Polish Orthodox Church received the ruined church as its property. Between 2008 and 2010, the church underwent a thorough renovation, during which 17th-century wall paintings were discovered and revealed, and the iconostasis, destroyed during World War I, was restored.

The church is the oldest sacred building owned by the Polish Orthodox Church. It is located at 11 Sądowa Street. It was entered into the registry of historical monuments on 24 November 1956 and 24 March 1970 under number A/474.

== History ==
=== Period and circumstances of creation ===
Some authors writing about the Szczebrzeszyn church, including the Orthodox priest of the local parish, Timofiej Tracz, who was involved in the Russification of the Chełm Land, consciously repeat an incorrect piece of information from the 18th-century Uniate parish chronicle by Father Jan Karol Lipowiecki, claiming that the church was founded as early as 1194. Father Lipowiecki, wanting to enhance the prestige of his church, deliberately falsified the description of its origins, asserting that its founder was the Rus' and Orthodox Prince Andrzej Górka. In fact, Andrzej Górka, the castellan of Międzyrzec, lived in the 16th century. The church could have been established before that century (although after 1194). There is also information suggesting that the church was built on the site of a 12th-century Latin church.

Architectural and archaeological studies show that between the 15th and the first half of the 16th century, the church consisted of an apse with a crypt and a rectangular nave. It is possible that this was the first Church of St. Nicholas, funded around 1394 by Dymitr of Goraj, which was associated with the establishment of the first Catholic parish in the area by Archbishop Jakub Strzemię of Halych at the end of 1397 or early 1398. Between 1555 and 1592, when the town was owned by the Protestant Górka family, Andrzej Górka likely took over the church from the Catholics and converted it into a Calvinist congregation. However, due to the small number of Protestants, the Górka family handed the church over to the Orthodox believers. At the same time, Andrzej and Stanisław Górka funded the church's reconstruction. Art historian Piotr Krasny points to several indications suggesting the 16th-century origins of the existing structure. Iron doors from 1540, located in the chancel wall, bear the initials of Andrzej Górka, which may suggest him as the church's benefactor. Additionally, the overall appearance of the church in its early period, as established through archaeological research in the 1980s and 1990s, is similar to the appearance of 16th-century Orthodox churches in Volhynia.

The Orthodox church most likely existed in Szczebrzeszyn in the mid-14th century. The first written mention of the town from this period describes it as "oppidum Ruthenicale" ("a Ruthenian settlement"). However, the first direct mention of an Orthodox parish dates back to 1588, when it refers to a church that had already existed for some time. Further information, concerning the church's endowment and the transfer of a half-lan in Rozłopy, is provided by a document issued in 1593 by Jan Czarnkowski.

=== Uniate church ===
The church in Szczebrzeszyn belonged to the Chełm eparchy and, together with it, passed to the Union of Brest in 1596, by the decision of Bishop Dionysius of Chełm. There are no documents that would allow to determine whether the church in Szczebrzeszyn was the subject of a fierce dispute between the supporters of the Union and Orthodoxy, as was the case in many other parishes of the Chełm eparchy. However, in February 1620, Uniate Bishop Athanasius Pakosta convened a synod of clergy from the local ecclesiastical district (deanery) in Szczebrzeszyn, which could indicate that the Union was actually accepted in the local parish, not just formally. Nevertheless, as late as 1670, Ulryk Werdum, in his description of Szczebrzeszyn, pointed out that only a few faithful of the local church considered themselves Catholics, while the majority remained Orthodox. In 1751, the Uniate church in Szczebrzeszyn had about 293 parishioners, of whom only 47 came from the town itself. This was the result of a gradual loss of faithful to the Roman Catholic Church, which began in the 15th century and did not stop even after the Union was adopted.

In the mid-18th century, Father Andrzej Karpiński initiated a partial renovation of the church, during which a new treasury was built. However, it existed only for several decades, until 1777. Father Karpiński planned further renovation of the church, but he died before realizing his plans. He left 5,000 PLN for this purpose. The renovation was ultimately carried out by Father Jan Karol Lipowiecki. He was prompted to do so by the collapse of the church's chancel two days before Christmas in 1777. The renovation was commissioned by Bishop Maksymilian Rylo of Chełm, who had visited the site in the spring of the same year. This bishop particularly cared about the appearance and decoration of churches in his diocese. Despite insufficient funds, renovation work began in May 1777, with a stonemason and architect from Zamość, likely Friedrich Gisges, developing the project and cost estimate.

The first stage of the renovation, which included replacing the walls of the chancel and constructing a temporary roof, took a month. Afterward, the parish was forced to suspend the work due to a lack of funds. The renovation resumed 10 years later. By the summer of 1787, work on the chancel was completed, with a new floor and roof installed, and in 1795, benches were placed in the church. The construction of the spacious chancel, which replaced the former small altar room, changed the interior layout of the church, making it more similar to Roman Catholic churches or 18th-century Uniate churches with Latinized architecture (e.g., the Church of St. Nicholas in Chełm, the church in Klesztów). It is unclear whether Father Lipowiecki, in deciding on such a significant change to the building's appearance, was influenced by the fashion for building Uniate churches resembling Latin churches, consciously wishing to give the church a Latin-like shape, or considered the new spatial arrangement more practical.

Father Teodor Batycki, Lipowiecki's successor as parson of Szczebrzeszyn, continued the renovation and decoration work in the church. In 1799, he ordered the repair of the fence surrounding the church grounds, and in the following year, he paid for further work on the roof and installed a main altar in place of the traditional iconostasis. In 1842, this altar was described as a four-columned aedicula with two doors, above which were two angel figures. In the aedicula, there was an icon of the Mother of God, believed to be miraculous. After the main altar, Father Batycki ordered two side altars with icons of St. Nicholas and the Dormition of the Mother of God. By 1808, there had been further significant changes to the appearance of the Szczebrzeszyn church. The tower on its façade was destroyed. In 1829, Father Jan Iwaszkiewicz initiated another reconstruction of the building, which was led by the master Daszkiewicz. Over the next seven years, the reconstruction demolished the kliroses and created a Gothic Revival façade, possibly based on a design from 1808. The inspiration for the new façade may have been the church in Wielącza, while the Szczebrzeszyn church became a model for the creators of the church in Zamch, built between 1842 and 1843. According to another source, the neo-Gothic façade, funded by Stanisław Kostka Zamoyski, was built as early as 1808. As a result, the building ultimately lost its external Eastern Christian sacred architecture features, in line with the trends in Uniate church construction of the time and the views of the then Bishop of Chełm, Ferdynand Dąbrowa-Ciechanowski.

By 1837, the church once again required renovation, and the roof was replaced that year. A more comprehensive restoration took place at the expense of the Russian administration of the Zamość County between 1867 and 1870. The renovation improved the technical condition of the church, but it also involved removing some elements of the interior that did not conform to Orthodox tradition. Side altars were removed, and the icons displayed in them were placed in a new, single-tier iconostasis. However, this renovation did not produce lasting effects. The new roof was destroyed by a storm in 1873, and its repair was delayed. As a result, the church fell into almost total ruin.

=== Orthodox church ===
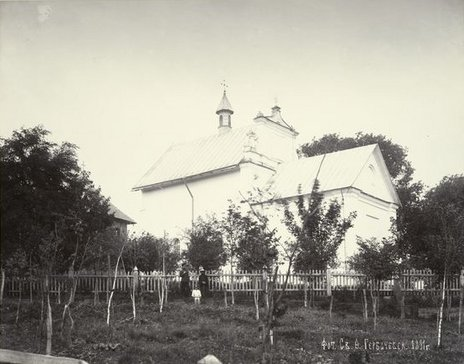
View of the church in 1891

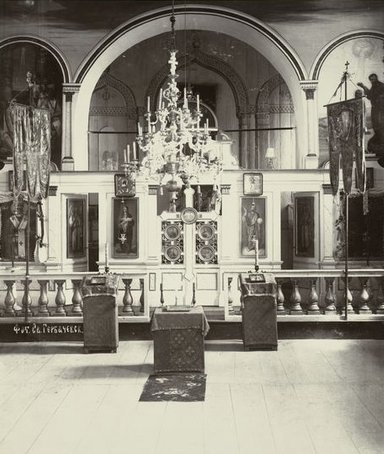
Interior of the church in 1891

The church in Szczebrzeszyn was once again transferred to the Orthodox parish in 1875, following the Conversion of Chełm Eparchy. On 27 May 1875, the local faithful formally converted to Orthodoxy in Zamość. However, many of them did not feel any connection to the new faith and unsuccessfully attempted to join the Roman Catholic Church. Due to the poor technical condition of the building, the Russian authorities considered demolishing the church and transferring the Orthodox parish to the former Franciscan church. Eventually, in 1876, work began on another renovation of the Church of the Dormition of the Mother of God. During this renovation, the bell tower was removed from the roof and replaced with an onion-shaped dome.

Father Timofiej Tracz, the local Orthodox priest, made unsuccessful attempts to draw reluctant parishioners to Orthodoxy, even with the help of the local Russian administration and police. This priest falsely described the situation of the Szczebrzeszyn parish, claiming that up to 1,100 people regularly attended the church. In reality, the Szczebrzeszyn parish did not function effectively, although Father Tracz was considered one of the best Orthodox preachers in the Eparchy of Chełm and Warsaw. After the issuance of Tsar Nicholas II's 1905 edict on religious tolerance, which allowed legal conversions to Catholicism, the majority of the parishioners in Szczebrzeszyn chose to return to Catholicism. Nevertheless, the church remained in use, serving the Russian military and officials stationed in the town. After their departure in 1915 during the exile, the church was closed and, being abandoned, suffered significant damage during World War I.

=== Abandoned church ===
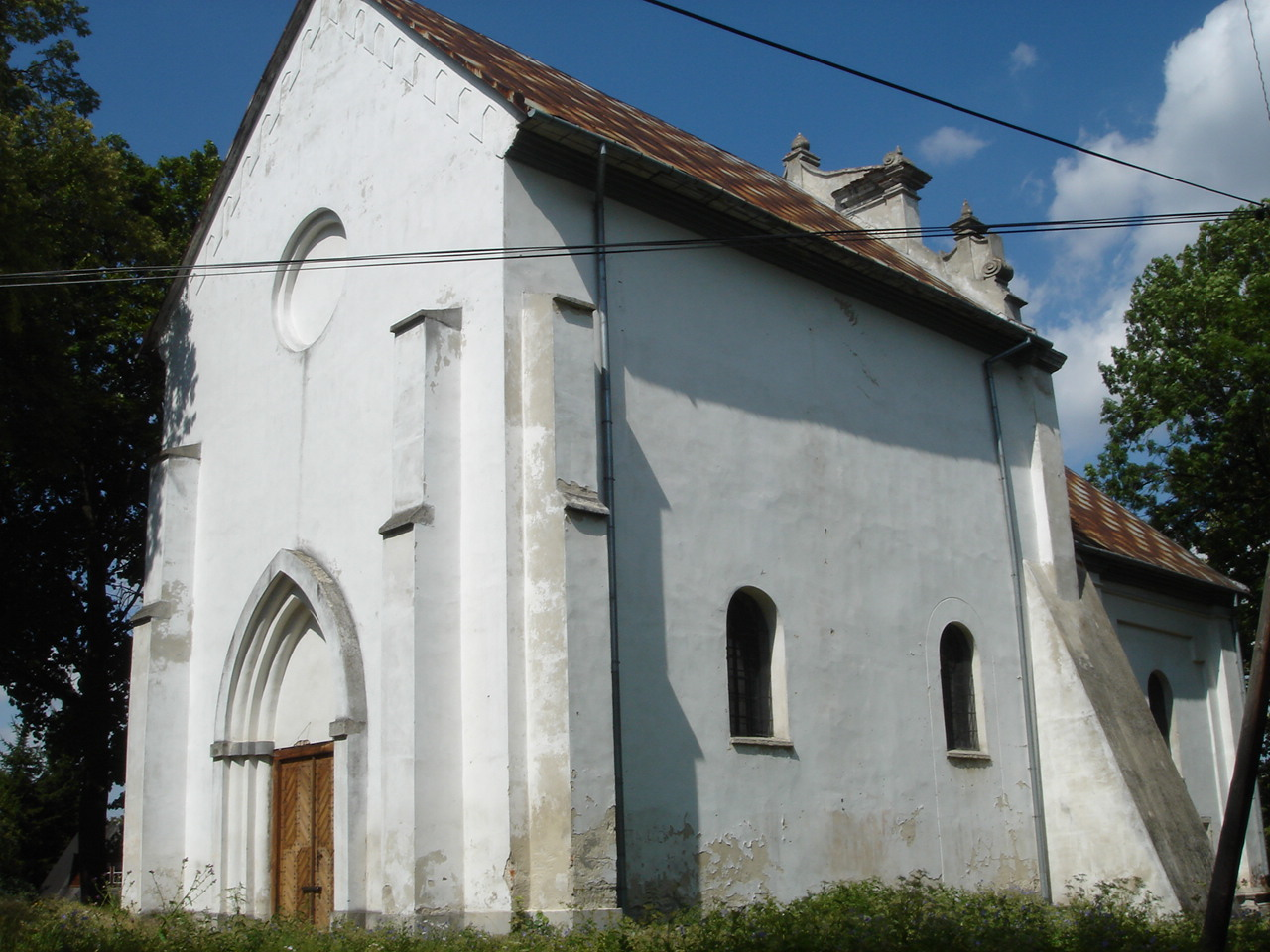
Condition before the 2008–2010 renovation

In 1919, the church in Szczebrzeszyn was not included on the list of Orthodox churches that the Polish Ministry of Religious Affairs and Public Education planned to reopen for worship. This decision was due to the lack of parishioners – during the interwar period, only two people in the town identified as Orthodox. In 1926, the ministry determined that the building, as a valuable historical monument, could remain as a picturesque ruin. The church's furnishings disappeared under unknown circumstances.

In 1938, the church was slated for demolition as part of the Polish government's reclamation and polonization campaign. Demolition work began but was halted due to protests from residents, including Maurycy Klemens Zamoyski. However, the dome and roof were removed, and the bell tower was demolished.

After World War II, the building was briefly used as a storage facility before being abandoned and transferred to state ownership. In the following decades, only emergency repairs were carried out at the state's expense. Between 1952 and 1953, the church was re-roofed and its walls reinforced, with additional repairs conducted in the 1970s. More extensive conservation efforts did not begin until 1981, despite the church being re-registered as a historical monument in 1970, described as a "rare example of a 16th-century brick Orthodox church with preserved authentic architectural details".

=== Return to the Orthodox Church and renovation ===
In 2006, the building was returned to the Polish Orthodox Church and became a filial church of St. Nicholas Parish in Zamość. At the time of its transfer, the structure was in a state of neglect and littered with debris.

In March 2008, the European Union, through the EEA and Norway Grants, granted the Polish Orthodox Church €1,571,904 for the renovation and furnishing of the church (as well as St. Symeon Stylites Church in Dołhobyczów). The restoration work included uncovering and conserving the wall paintings, reconstructing the iconostasis, renovating the nave and chancel, and rebuilding the church's surrounding fence.

Religious services are held only on major Orthodox holidays due to the small number of parishioners in the town and surrounding area. However, the church remains open for visitors.

Since September 2019, the church has been under the jurisdiction of the Orthodox parish of St. George in Biłgoraj. Services are now held on the second and fourth Sunday of each month, as well as on the patronal feast day (15 August).

== Architecture ==
=== Building structure ===
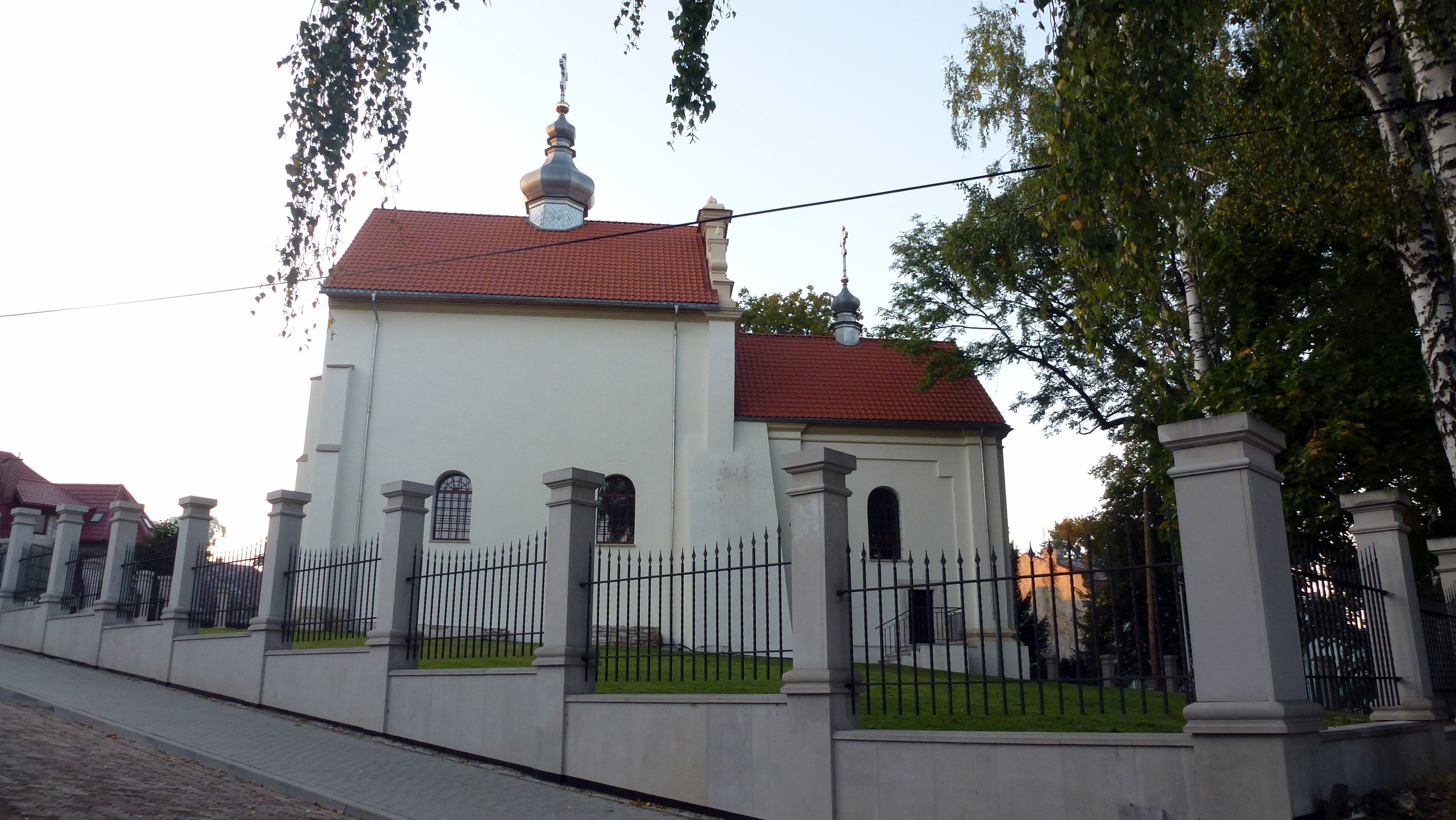
Contemporary view of the church (after the 2008–2010 renovation)

Archaeological research conducted in the 1980s and 1990s helped determine the age of various parts of the church and its original appearance. The oldest part of the structure is the rectangular nave. Originally, a tower stood in front of its façade, and the chancel had a three-sided apse. This layout resembles 16th-century Orthodox ecclesiastical architecture typical of Volhynia.

Archaeologists discovered the foundations of semicircular annexes along the church's side walls, made of sandstone blocks, while the nave's foundations were constructed from fieldstones. This suggests that the church originally featured apses, a characteristic element of Orthodox architecture in Central Europe. These likely date to the 17th century. In the same period, a gable was added above the church's eastern wall, based on the motif of an aedicula with a large recessed panel. The massive volutes and other details suggest that its creators were artists associated with the workshop of Wojciech Lenartowicz or Jan Michał Link, who worked on several other churches in the Zamoyski family entail during the same century.

The church is a single-nave, oriented building. In addition to the main entrance on the western side, it has a secondary entrance on the south, leading directly to the chancel. The entire structure is rectangular in plan, including the chancel. The church was built from limestone using limestone mortar. The window frames, lintels, and some buttresses were made of ceramic brick. The buttresses at the junction of the chancel and nave are brick-clad, but their core is filled with limestone. Originally, the nave had a vaulted ceiling, but following renovations in the 1980s, it is now covered with a reinforced concrete ceiling. The vaulting in the chancel has also not survived. The church is topped with a gable roof covered with galvanized steel sheeting. Above the chancel arch, there is a decorative gable, which was originally covered with ceramic tiles.

=== Interior decor and former furnishings ===
The original furnishings of the church in Szczebrzeszyn have not survived, except for a door from 1540. The church contains a series of wall paintings created at the turn of the 16th and 17th centuries. The frescoes depict scenes from the Apocalypse and the Passion. The presence of the Jelita and Trach coats of arms on one of the fresco layers allows for identifying Marcin Zamoyski and his wife, Anna Franciszka née Gnińska, as at least partial benefactors of the decoration. If they were created during the couple's lifetime, they should be dated between 1674 and 1689. Around 1718, the frescoes were restored at the behest of the estate holder, Tomasz Józef Zamoyski, and his wife, Antonina Zamoyska. This event is commemorated by a bipartite coat of arms combining Jelita and Korczak, adorned with an acanthus leaf motif.

The museum in Zamość holds icons of the Mother of God and Christ Pantocrator, which originally belonged to the lower tier of the church's iconostasis. In his work on Orthodox relics in the Chełm Land, Fiodor Gorbaczewski also described an icon of the Dormition of the Mother of God from the church in Szczebrzeszyn, which was originally displayed in the place designated for the church's patronal icon. These images date back to the 17th century, the same period in which the entire iconostasis was created. A description of the structure found in the 18th-century chronicle of Father Lipowiecki suggests that it resembled similarly elaborate constructions known from churches of the Polish-Lithuanian Commonwealth. By the late 18th century, the iconostasis had been replaced by a main altar, and during renovations between 1867 and 1870, it was substituted with a single-tier iconostasis.

The icon of the Mother of God from the church in Szczebrzeszyn was particularly venerated as a miraculous image, especially in the 18th century. However, records of this devotion in the following century are scarce. The cult of this icon was of local significance.

== Bibliography ==
- Krasny, P. (2010). Fabrica Ecclesiae Ruthenorum. Dzieje cerkwi w Szczebrzeszynie i jej rozbudowy w latach 1777–1789 w świetle kroniki ks. Jana Karola Lipowieckiego [Fabrica Ecclesiae Ruthenorum. The History of the Church in Szczebrzeszyn and Its Expansion in the Years 1777–1789 in the Light of the Chronicle of Father Jan Karol Lipowiecki] (in Polish). Kraków: DoDo Editor.
