= Twentieth of Sivan =

The Twentieth of Sivan (Hebrew: תענית כ׳ בסיוון) is a historic Jewish fast day, first instituted by Rabbeinu Tam in 1171. Observed on the 20th day of the Hebrew month of Sivan, it originally commemorated a massacre on that date at Blois in France, the first blood libel in continental Europe. It also came to represent other anti-Jewish violence during the Crusades era, such as the Rhineland massacres.

The day was later also marked to commemorate the Cossack riots of 1648–49 in Poland-Lithuania, instituted by the Council of Four Lands in 1650, taking the coinciding date of an early attack on the Jews of Nemyriv in 1648. After World War II, suggestions were made to observe it as a Holocaust memorial day, but this was not widely adopted; it was particularly supported for a time by rabbis in marking the mass deportations from Hungary to Auschwitz of May-June 1944. In 1948, Tzvi Pesach Frank proposed to use the day to commemorate the fall of the Jewish Quarter in the Battle for Jerusalem.

Some communities still recite the Selichot service for the occasion. They are recited today by Belz Hasidim, Skver Hasidim and Papa Hasidim.
