= Szczebrzeszyn =

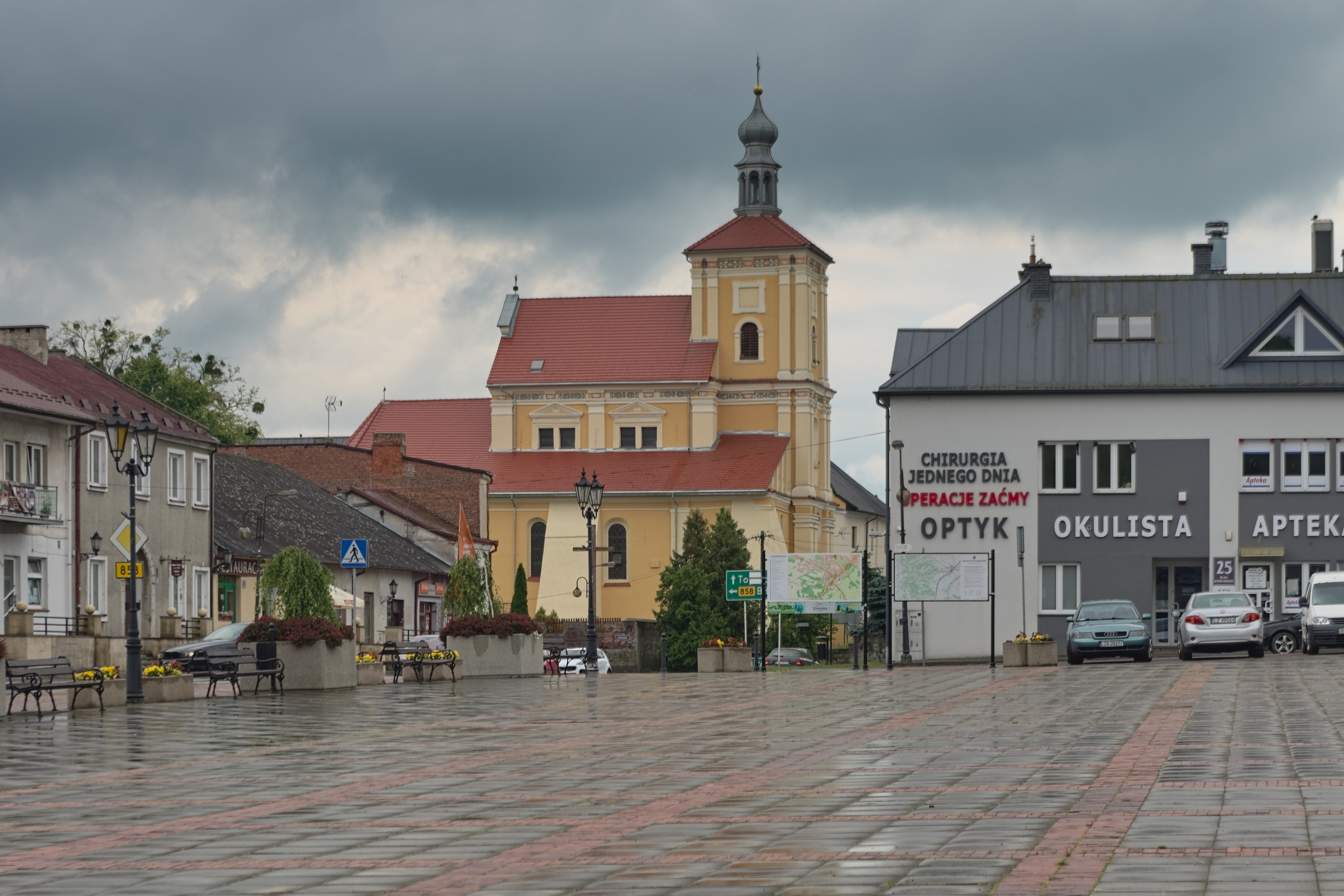
- Kościuszko Sq. and St. Catherine's Church

- Coat of arms

- Location within Poland
- Coordinates: 50°41′N 22°58′E
- Country: Poland
- Voivodeship: Lublin
- County: Zamość
- Gmina: Szczebrzeszyn

Government
  - Mayor: Rafał Kowalik (BS)

Area
  - Total: 29.12 km^{2} (11.24 sq mi)
- Elevation: 230 m (750 ft)

Population (2006)
  - Total: 5,299
  - Density: 182.0/km^{2} (471.3/sq mi)
- Time zone: UTC+1 (CET)
  - Summer (DST): UTC+2 (CEST)
- Postal code: 22-460
- Car plates: LZA
- Website: http://www.szczebrzeszyn.pl

Szczebrzeszyn (Polish: [ʂt͡ʂɛˈbʐɛʂɨn]; Yiddish: שעברעשין, romanized: Shebreshin) is a town in southeastern Poland in Lublin Voivodeship, in Zamość County, about 20 km (12 mi) west of Zamość. The town serves as the seat to the Gmina Szczebrzeszyn district. A 2004 census counted 5,357 inhabitants. It lends its name to the Szczebrzeszyn Landscape Park. Szczebrzeszyn is often called the "Capital City of Polish Language".

== History ==
=== Early history ===
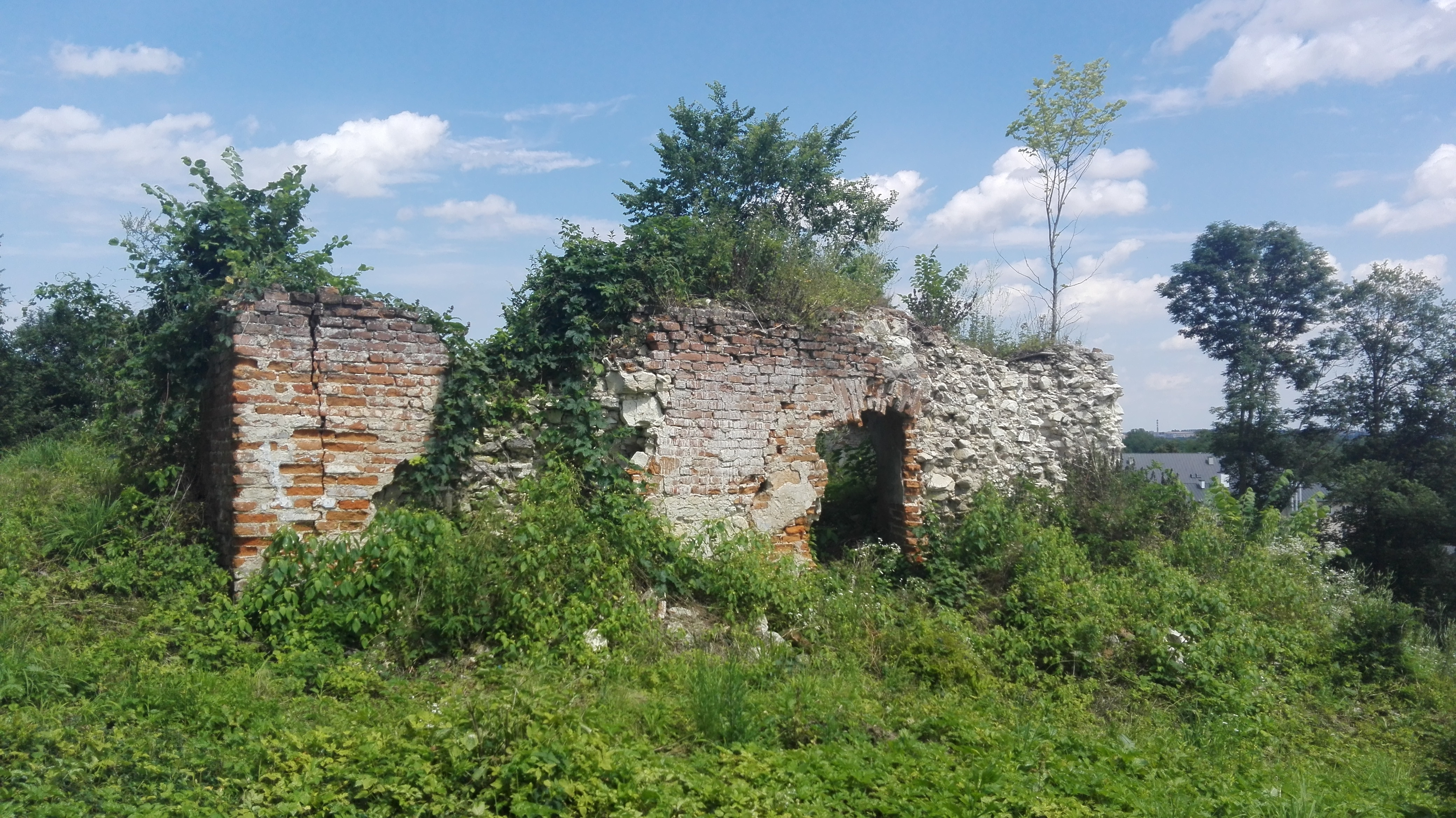
Medieval castle ruins

Szczebrzeszyn's history can be traced back to 1352, during the reign of Casimir III, although archaeological evidence suggests the area had been settled for several centuries prior to this. Neighboring villages named in Nestor's 11th century chronicle of Rus further support that Szczebrzeszyn is much older, once lying beside a major commercial route running from south to north.

By 1492, trade had developed enough to warrant a special act imposed by John I Albert of Poland. The Act specified which roads Szczebrzeszyn merchants could use when traveling through Lesser Poland with their wares. As merchants traveled through Szczebrzeszyn, they paid set taxes which proved to be an excellent source of revenue.

After Jan Amor Tarnowski of Tarnów's death in 1500, Szczebrzeszyn stayed in the hands of the Tarnowski family for the next 20 years. Later it was included in a dowry to the Kmita family. At that time long-running feuds among family members re-ignited over the Szczebrzeszyn inheritance, while other magnates laid claims. King Sigismund Augustus issued a binding decree to end this dispute in 1555, which allocated rights over the town to the Gorka family of Greater Poland. The Gorkas took a strong interest in religious matters and granted freedom to all religious groups. They built a Greek Orthodox church, transformed the Roman Catholic parish church into a Calvinist one, and opened a synagogue nearby.

=== World War II ===
==== The Holocaust ====
Between 3,000 and 4,000 Jews lived in Szczebrzeszyn when the German Army occupied the town in 1939. Isaac Bashevis Singer's grandmother, Tema Blima Szejner was from the town. Singer mentions his grandmother Tema in his autobiographical novel 'In My Father's Court'. On October 14, 1939—in spite of the fact it was the Jewish Sabbath—the Germans ordered the Jews to clean the streets for the entire day. They treated them brutally by cutting or tearing off their beards, cursing them, and beating them. In mid-October a police force was formed in Szczebrzeszyn—composed of 60 men—and was instructed to persecute the Jewish population of the town.

Several hundred Jews from Kalisz and Włocławek were re-settled in Szczebrzeszyn. The Judenrat was forced to provide several dozen men for work in Zamość each day. According to a Polish doctor in the town and Polish resistance member, Zygmunt Klukowski: "The Jewish laborers are sent to Bortatycze and Bialobrzeg outside of Zamość. The work consists of digging ditches in order to drain the swamps there. They must work standing in the water. They sleep in barracks that are incredibly dirty. They must make this trip (to the labor camp) every day, and if they make the slightest mistake they are beaten with clubs. The Jewish slave laborers are covered with lice. They are mostly boys, 17–20 years old."

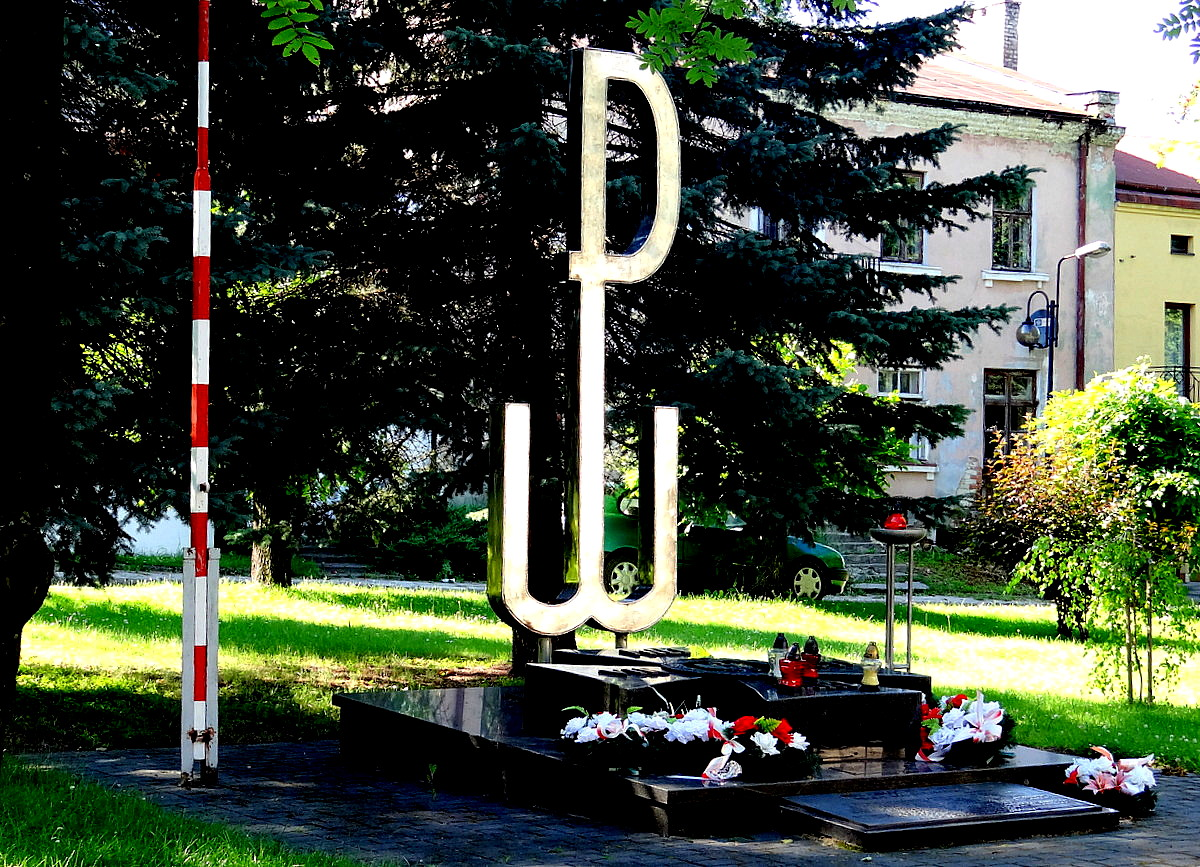
Home Army Monument

On November 10, 1942, Klukowski wrote: "In principle, all the Jews in the settlements of the Biłgoraj district, to which Szczebreszyn belongs, have been killed. The only ones remaining are those in the forests, valleys, etc." In total, there were six separate transports from Szczebrzeszyn to Bełżec extermination camp between May and November 1942—totaling more than 5,500 Jewish men, women and children to their immediate deaths. Hundreds of other Jews were murdered in Szczebrzeszyn, hunted down by German SS troops and then murdered. One Polish couple did shelter a Jewish family and were named Righteous Among the Nations by Yad Vashem after the war. The once vibrant Jewish community of Szczebrzeszyn ceased to exist.

==== After the Zamość Uprising ====
In July the Polish resistance carried out the country-wide Operation Tempest, and in the Zamość region the town of Szczebrzeszyn and Zamość itself were freed by the partisans.

== In literature ==
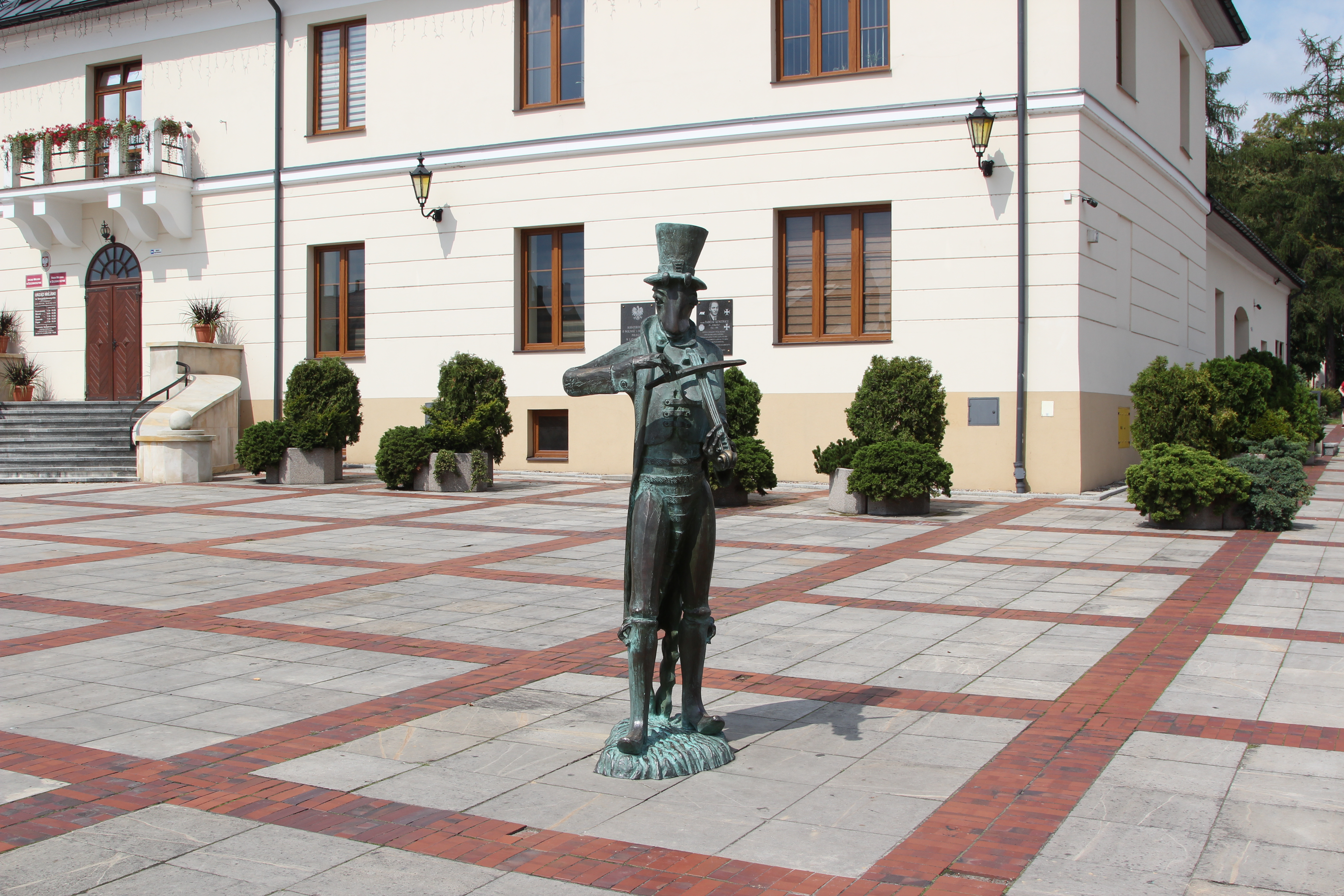
The statue of a beetle (chrząszcz)

The name Szczebrzeszyn is infamous for being very difficult to pronounce for non-native speakers. Polish poet, Jan Brzechwa, used the town's name in his poem entitled Chrząszcz. The first line is: W Szczebrzeszynie chrząszcz brzmi w trzcinie (pronunciation)

This roughly translates to: "In [the town of] Szczebrzeszyn a beetle sounds in the reed". The phrase has been incorporated in everyday language as an epitome of Polish tongue twisters, and is often presented by natives to foreign learners of Polish. Two monuments depicting a cricket playing the violin were erected in Szczebrzeszyn in reference to the poem.

In 2004 Philip Bibel (1909–2006), brother of painter Leon Bibel, published his Tales of the Shtetl, a memoir of early 20th century life in the shtetl of Szczebrzeszyn. Sample chapters can be read here: Our Shabbos in Shebreshin Noise, Music, and Klezmer The Last Jew

== Notable people ==
- Józef Brandt (1841–1915), painter, born in Szczebrzeszyn
- Leon Bibel (1913–1995), painter, born in Szczebrzeszyn
- Meir ben Samuel of Shcherbreshin (17th century), poet of Szczebrzeszyn
- Kazimierz Kelles-Krauz (1872–1905), philosopher, sociologist, born in Szczebrzeszyn
- Zygmunt Klukowski (1885–1959), physician, bibliophile, historian, member of the Home Army, lived in Szczebrzeszyn

== Gallery ==
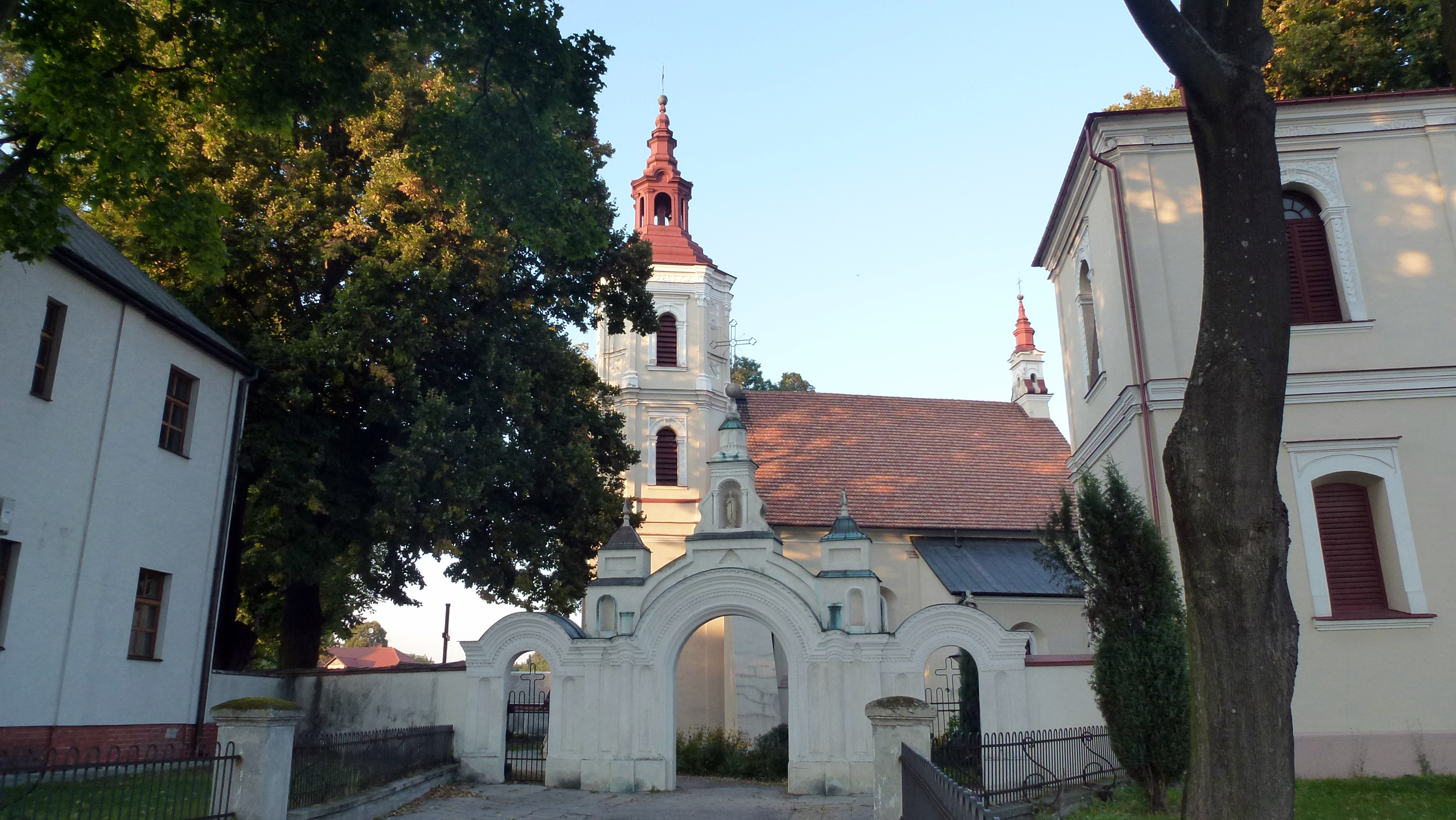
St. Nicolas church

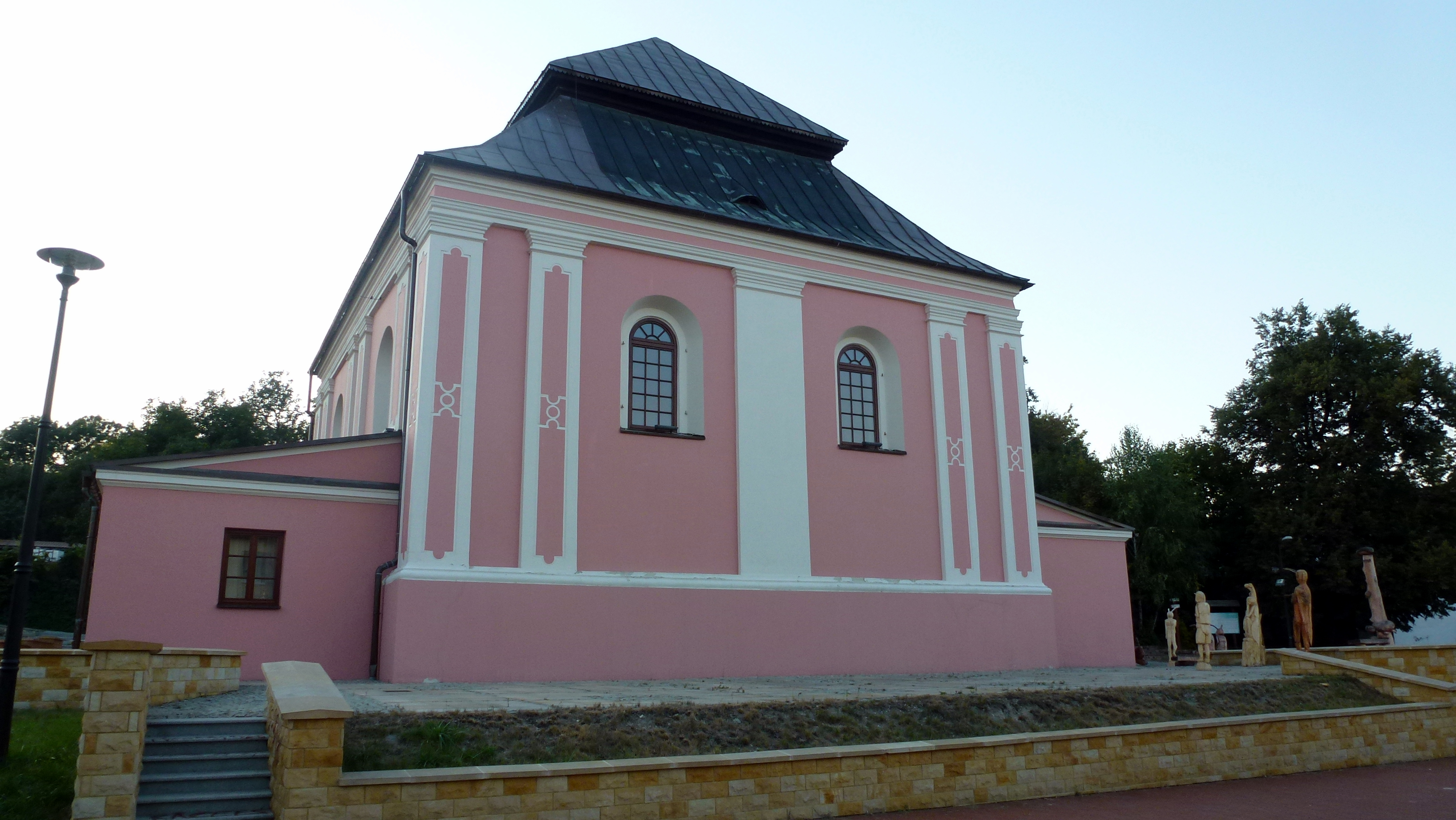
Former synagogue, nowadays community centre

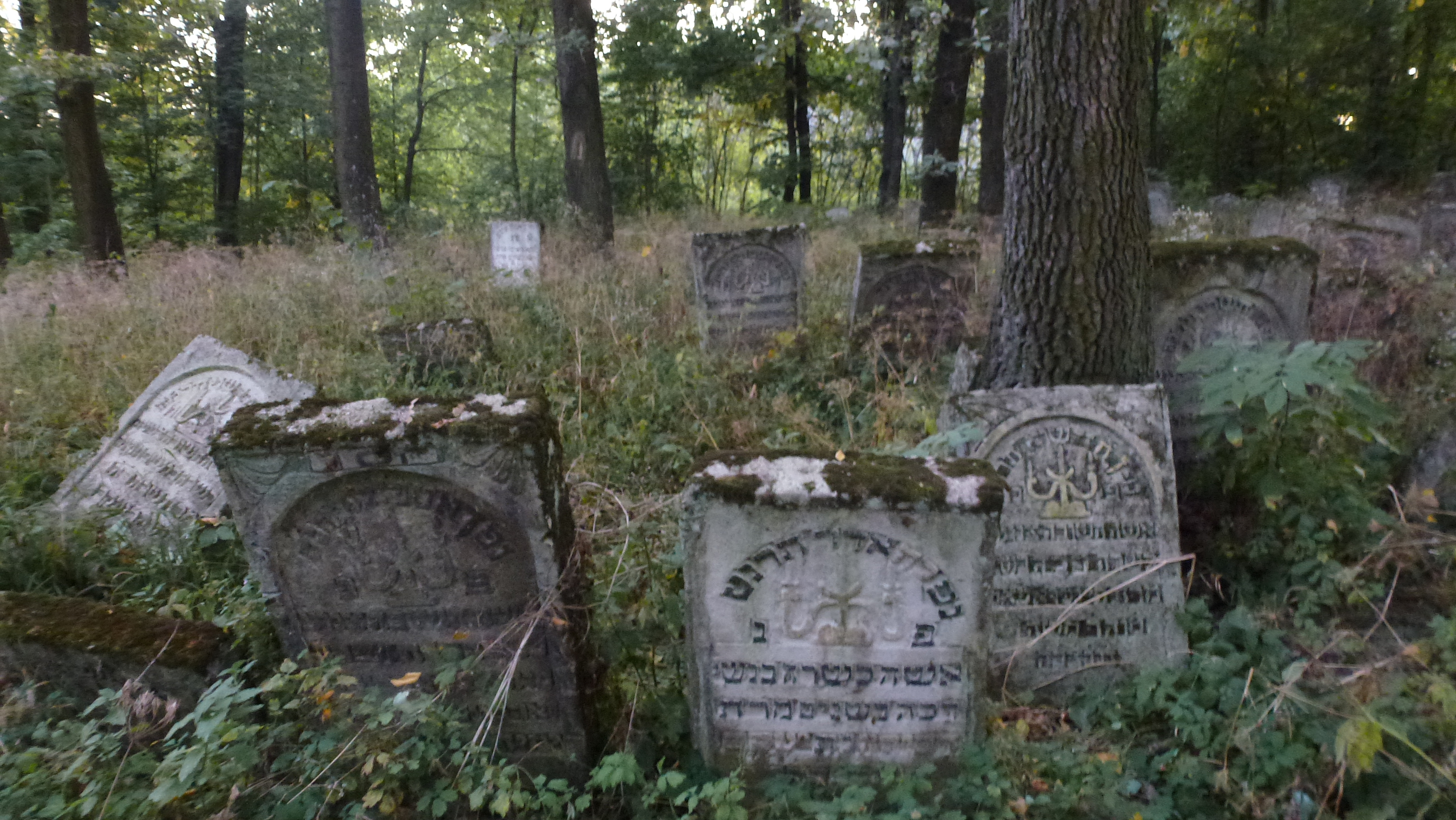
Jewish cemetery

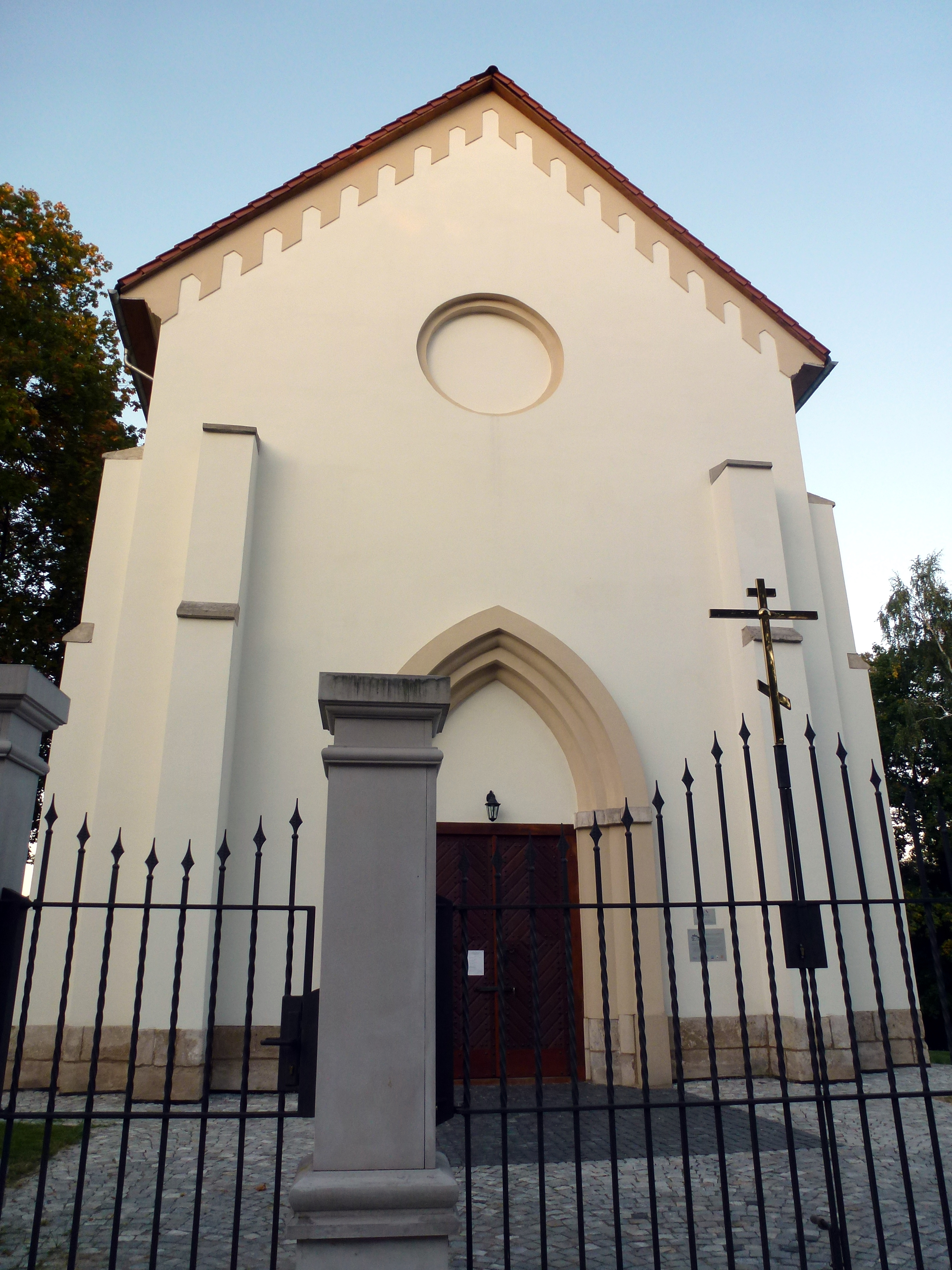
Orthodox church
