= Meir ben Samuel of Shcherbreshin =

17th century Jewish poet

Meir ben Samuel of Shcherbreshin (Yiddish: מאיר בן שמואל משעברעשין) was a 17th-century paytan and chronicler.

In the years of taḥ ve-tat (1648–49) he lived at Shcherbreshin, Poland, an honored member of the community, from where he escaped, on its invasion by the Cossacks, to Krakow. There he published his Tzok ha-Ittim (1650), an eyewitness account, in Hebrew verse, of Jewish persecution during the Cossack uprising. This book was afterward published by Joshua ben David of Lemberg under his own name; Moritz Steinschneider was the first to discover this plagiarism.

Meir wrote also Mizmor Shir le-Yom ha-Shabbat, a Sabbath hymn in Aramaic and Yiddish (Venice, 1639; Amsterdam, 1654).

== Publications ==
- Mizmor Shir le-Yom ha-Shabbat [Psalm for the Sabbath]. Venice: Giovanni Vendramin. 1639.
- Tzok ha-Ittim [Sufferings of the Times]. Krakow. 1650.
