= Salomon Mandelkern =

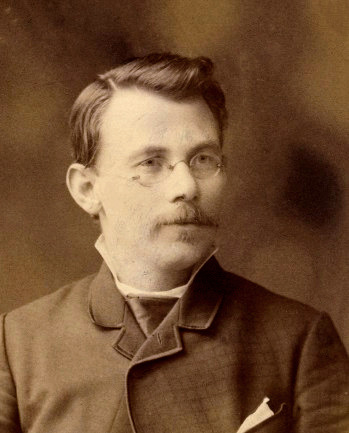
Salomon Mandelkern

Solomon Mandelkern (Russian: Соломон Манделькерн, romanized: Solomon Mandelkern; 1846 in Mlyniv, Volhynian Governorate, Russian Empire (now in Ukraine) – March 24, 1902 in Vienna; pseudonym Mindaloff) was a Russian lexicographer, poet and author.

== Early life ==
Mandelkern was born to a Jewish family. He was educated as a Talmudist. After his father's death he went to Dubno (he was then fourteen), where he continued his Talmudical studies. He became associated with the Ḥasidim in that community and with their "rabbi," Menachem Mendel of Kotzk, with whose son David he spent some time studying Jewish philosophy and Cabala.

After his marriage he went to Wilna, entered its rabbinical school, and graduated as a rabbi.

Mandelkern subsequently studied Oriental languages at St. Petersburg University, where he was awarded a gold medal for an essay on the parallel passages of the Bible. In 1873 he became assistant rabbi at Odessa, where he was the first to deliver sermons in Russian, and where he studied law at the university. The degree of Ph.D. was conferred upon him by the University of Jena.

About 1880 he settled in Leipzig and occupied himself with literary work and with teaching. In 1900 he visited the United States; he returned to Leipzig in 1901, and was visiting Vienna when he suddenly became ill and died in the Jewish hospital of that city.

== Works ==
Mandelkern was a prolific writer in several languages, especially in Hebrew, in which he produced poetical works of considerable merit. His literary career began in 1886 with "Teru'at Melekh Rav," an ode to Alexander II of Russia, followed by "Bat Sheva'," an epic poem, "Ezra ha-Sofer," a novel (transl. from the German by Ludwig Philippson), and a satirical work entitled "Ḥiẓẓim Shenunim" (all published in Wilna).

Other works of his are:

- "Divrey Yemey Russya," a history of Russia (Warsaw, 1875; written for the Society for the Promotion of Culture Among Russian Jews; for this work he was presented by the czar with a ring set with brilliants)
- "Shirey Sefat 'Ever," Hebrew poems (2 vols., Leipzig, 1882 and 1889)
- and "Shirey Yeshurun," a translation of Byron's "Hebrew Melodies" (ib. 1890).

He published also: "Bogdan Chmelnitzki," in Russian, a translation of Hanover's Yewen Meẓulah (St. Petersburg, 1878; Leipzig, 1883); a Russian edition of Lessing's fables (ib. 1885); and "Tamar," a novel in German (ib. 1885; really a translation of Mapu's "Ahavat Ẓiyyon," without any mention of Mapu as the author). Sermons by him in Russian, and Russian and German translations of his Hebrew songs and articles, have appeared in various periodicals; and most Hebrew journals and year-books published within the last thirty years (especially "Ha-Shaḥar," "Ha-Asif") contain articles, poems, and epigrams by him.

Mandelkern's greatest work is the "Heykhal ha-Ḳodesh," or "Veteris Testamenti Concordantiæ," a Hebrew-Latin concordance of the Hebrew and Chaldaic words found in the Bible (Leipzig, 1896), which almost superseded all similar works of that nature. An abridged edition of this monumental work appeared under the title "Tavnit Hekhal" (ib. 1897; for the various criticisms which were made of Mandelkern in connection with the two editions of the concordance, and for lists of errata, see Bernhard Stade's "Zeitschrift," xviii. 165, 348; xix. 187-191, 350; xxii. 320; xxiii. 94, 352; xxiv. 146; etc.).

In his last years Mandelkern was engaged in the composition of a Talmudic and Midrashic concordance, part of which, probably, was left in manuscript.
