= Chaldean language =

Chaldean language may refer to:

- Ancient Chaldean language, the language of ancient Chaldeans
- Chaldean language (misnomer), a former misnomer for Biblical Aramaic
- Chaldean Neo-Aramaic, another name for the Suret language

== See also ==
- Chaldean (disambiguation)
