= Petro Mirchuk =

Ukrainian writer, activist

- Петро Мірчук
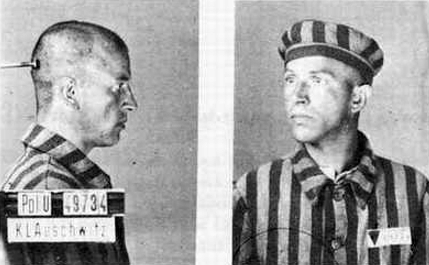
- Official Auschwitz photo, 1942
- Born: June 26, 1913; Dobrivliany, Austria-Hungary
- Died: May 16, 1999 (aged 85); Philadelphia, Pennsylvania, United States
- Occupation: Writer

Petro Yuriiovych Mirchuk (Note: Ukrainian: Петро Юрійович Мірчук, romanized: Petro Yuriiovych Mirchuk) (June 26, 1913 – May 16, 1999) was a Ukrainian writer living in the United States and a leading member of the Organization of Ukrainian Nationalists. Mirchuk headed the OUN's propaganda apparatus in 1939. He was an activist of the Bandera faction of OUN (known as OUN-B). During World War II, he was imprisoned in Auschwitz, Mauthausen, and other concentration camps. He entered the United States as a displaced person after the war. He authored several books about the OUN and UPA, and wrote the first biography of Stefan Bandera.
