= Meyer Kayserling =

German rabbi and historian (1829–1905)

Meyer Kayserling

Meyer Kayserling (also Meir or Moritz, 17 June 1829 – 21 April 1905) was a German rabbi and historian.

== Life ==
Kayserling was born in Gleidingen in the Kingdom of Hanover, and was the brother of writer and educator Simon Kayserling. He was educated at Halberstadt, at Nikolsburg (Moravia) where he studied under Samson Raphael Hirsch, at Prague where he studied under S.J. Rapoport, at Würzburg where he studied under Seligman Baer Bamberger, and finally at the Humboldt University of Berlin. He devoted himself to history and philosophy. Encouraged in historical researches in Berlin by Leopold von Ranke, Kayserling turned his attention to the history and literature of the Jews of the Iberian Peninsula.

In 1861, the government of Aargau appointed him rabbi of the two Swiss Jewish municipalities of Endingen and Lengnau in Surbtal, an office he held until 1870. During his residence in Switzerland, he argued in favor of civil equality for his coreligionists and also maintained contacts with high-ranking Swiss politicians such as Jakob Dubs, Emil Welti, and Augustin Keller. Kayserling founded the Swiss Jewish Cultural Society (Kulturverein der Israeliten in der Schweiz) which campaigned for the civil rights of Jews in the Aargau region (achieved in 1879). In the Aargau, the Jewish communities were given special exemption from a law requiring that animals had to killed by a blow to the head. Proponents of animal rights attacked this exemption for the purposes of shechita. Kayserling (1869) published a pamphlet in defence of the practice. The society for animal rights and the Jewish community reached a compromise in 1889, which required the animals to be anesthetized before shechita. Nevertheless, the practice of shechita was outlawed in Switzerland in the first popular initiative, in 1893.

In 1870, Kayserling accepted a call as preacher and rabbi to the Jewish community of Budapest, where he died 35 years later, aged 75.

Kayserling was a member of the Royal Academy in Madrid and of the Trinity Historical Society.

== Works ==
Kayserling contributed to the different Jewish magazines published in Hebrew, German, English, and French; he also issued a new revised edition of Hecht's Handbuch der Israelitischen Geschichte (1874; 7th ed., 1901). From 1884 he prepared the part of the Jahresberichte der Geschichtsforschung (Berlin) which treated Jewish history.

=== Selected works ===
- 1856, Moses Mendelssohn's Philosophische und Religiöse Grundsätze mit Hinblick auf Lessing, Leipzig
- 1859, Sephardim. Romanische Poesien der Juden in Spanien. Ein Beitrag zur Literatur und Geschichte der Spanisch-Portugiesischen Juden, Leipzig
- 1859, Ein Feiertag in Madrid. Zur Geschichte der Spanisch-Portugiesischen Juden, Berlin.
- 1861, Geschichte der Juden in Navarra, den Baskenländern und auf den Balearen, oder Geschichte der Juden in Spanien, I., Berlin.
- 1861, Menasse ben Israel. Sein Leben und Wirken. Zugleich ein Beitrag zur Geschichte der Juden in England, Berlin; English transl. by F. de Sola Mendes, London, 1877.
- 1862, Moses Mendelssohn. Sein Leben und Seine Werke, Leipzig; a second edition of this work, enlarged and revised, bears the title "Moses Mendelssohn. Sein Leben und Wirken," Leipzig, 1888.
- 1864, Der Dichter Ephraim Kuh. Ein Beitrag zur Geschichte der Deutschen Literatur, Berlin.
- 1866, Zum Siegesfeste. Dankpredigt und Danklieder von Moses Mendelssohn, Berlin.
- 1867, Geschichte der Juden in Portugal, Berlin.
- 1867, Die Rituale Schlachtfrage, oder Ist Schächten Thierquälerei? Aargau. (ub.uni-frankfurt.de)
- 1870-72, Bibliothek Jüdischer Kanzelredner. Eine Chronologische Sammlung der Predigten, Biographien und Charakteristiken der Vorzüglichsten Jüdischen Prediger. Nebst einem Homiletischen und Literarischen Beiblatte, 2 vols., Berlin.
- 1871, Die Judeninsel und der Schiffbruch bei Koblenz, Baden.
- 1879, Die Jüdischen Frauen in der Geschichte, Literatur und Kunst, Leipzig, Brockhaus; translated into Hungarian by M. Reismann, Budapest, 1883.
- 1882, Das Moralgesetz des Judenthums in Beziehung auf Familie, Staat und Gesellschaft, published anonymously, Vienna.
- 1882, Die Blutbeschuldigung von Tisza-Eszlár Beleuchtet; also in Hungarian, Budapest.
- 1882, Der Wucher und das Judenthum; also in Hungarian, Budapest.
- 1883, Moses Mendelssohn. Ungedrucktes und Unbekanntes von Ihm und über Ihn, Leipzig.
- 1889, Refranos é Proverbios de los Judios Españoles, Budapest.
- 1890, Biblioteca Española-Portugueza-Judaica. Dictionnaire Bibliographique, Strasbourg.
- 1891, Dr. W. A. Meisel. Ein Lebens- und Zeitbild, Leipzig.
- 1891, Sterbetage aus Alter und Neuer Zeit, Prague.
- 1892, Gedenkblätter. Hervorragende Jüdische Persönlichkeiten des Neunzehnten Jahrhunderts. In Kurzen Charakteristiken, Leipzig.
- 1894, Christopher Columbus and the Participation of the Jews in the Spanish and Portuguese Discoveries, translated from the author's manuscript by Charles Gross, New York, 1894; German ed., Berlin, 1894; Hebrew transl., Warsaw, 1895.
- 1896, Die Jüdische Litteratur von Moses Mendelssohn bis auf die Gegenwart, reprinted from Winter and Wünsche, "Die Jüdische Litteratur seit Abschluss des Kanons," Treves.
- 1898, Ludwig Philippson. Eine Biographie, Leipzig.
- 1898, Die Juden als Patrioten, a lecture, Berlin.
- 1901, Die Juden von Toledo, a lecture, Leipzig.
- 1902, Isaak Aboab III. Sein Leben und Seine Dichtungen, in Hebrew, Berdychev.

== Sources ==
- Cecil Roth: KAYSERLING, MEYER in: Encyclopedia Judaica 9, 1972, p. 1106 .
- Hans Lamm: Kayserling, Meyer. In: Neue Deutsche Biographie (NDB) 11, Duncker & Humblot, Berlin 1977, p. 386.
- L. Philippson, Biography of Meyer Kayserling (1898).
- W. A. Meisel, Ein Lebens-und Zeitbild … (1891).
- M. Weisz, Bibliographie der Schriften Dr. M. Kayserlings (1929).
- E. Neumann (ed.), Kayserling (1906).
