= Isaac Aboab =

Isaac Aboab is the name of:

- Isaac Aboab I (fl. end of the 14th century), Jewish Talmudic scholar
- Isaac Aboab of Castile (1433–1493), Spanish rabbi and Bible commentator
- Isaac Aboab da Fonseca (1605–1693), Portuguese-born Dutch rabbi, scholar, kabbalist and writer
