= Abraham Aboab (Hamburg) =

Western Sephardic Portuguese philanthropist and rabbi

Rabbi Abraham ben Menasseh Aboab (Hebrew: רבי אברהם בן מנשה אבוהב; d. 1642) also known as Abraham Aboab V was a Western Sephardic Portuguese philanthropist and Rabbi, who was an early founder of the Portuguese Jewish community in Hamburg.

== Biography ==
Born to the Aboab family around 1560 in Lisbon, Portugal. Abraham Aboab's father Rav Menasseh Aboab was a crypto-Jew, and the son of Abraham Aboab IV. In his early years he went by his Christian alias "António Faleiro". He and his brother Jacob amassed great wealth by trading colonial commerce assets in Lisbon. In order to escape the Portuguese inquisition, he and his brother later moved to Antwerp, Belgium, where they reverted to the surname Aboab and headquartered an important family firm in which they imported sugar and spices from Portugal to Italy and Northern Europe.

Abraham later married Ana Dinis, and the couple moved to Hamburg in 1611. In Hamburg, he built the second synagogue in that city, named "Keter Torah," for the Portuguese community, and founded several Yeshivahs both in Germany and in the Land of Israel with the wealth he had amassed. He was also granted a coat of arms. In 1625, he moved to Verona, where he died in 1642. He is the father of Samuel Aboab and the grandfather of Jacob Aboab.
