= Isaac Canpanton =

Spanish rabbi

Isaac ben Jacob Canpanton (1360–1463) (Hebrew: יצחק קנפנטון) was a Spanish rabbi. He lived in the period darkened by the outrages of Ferrand Martinez and Vicente Ferrer, when intellectual life and Talmudic erudition were on the decline among the Jews of Spain. The historiographers Immanuel Aboab (Nomologia, ii. 2), Zacuto (Yuḥasin, ed. Filipowski, p. 226b; compare Seder ha-Dorot, pp. 27b, 28a), and Joseph ben Zaddik (Neubauer, Anecdota Oxoniensia, i. 99) unite in designating Canpanton as a gaon, Aboab stating that he was styled "the gaon of Castile". Among his pupils may be mentioned Samuel (ibn Sadillo) al-Valensi, Isaac Aboab, and Isaac De Leon. He died at Peñafiel in 1463.

He left but one work, Darche ha-Gemara, or Darche ha-Talmud ("A Methodology of the Talmud"), which is an important contribution to the subject, as it attempts to be a practical guide for those who are called upon to teach the Talmud. It was published at Constantinople, ca. 1520; Venice, 1565; Mantua, 1593; Amsterdam, 1706, 1711, 1754; Vienna, 1891 (edited by Isaac H. Weiss)ת Jerusalem, 1981 and 2020.

== Jewish Encyclopedia bibliography ==
- Grätz, Gesch. der Juden, 3d ed., viii. 217 et seq.;
- Jellinek, קונטרס הכללים, p. 6, Vienna, 1878.
