= Aboab family =

Western Sephardic family, originally from Aragon, Spain

Aboab family Família Aboab
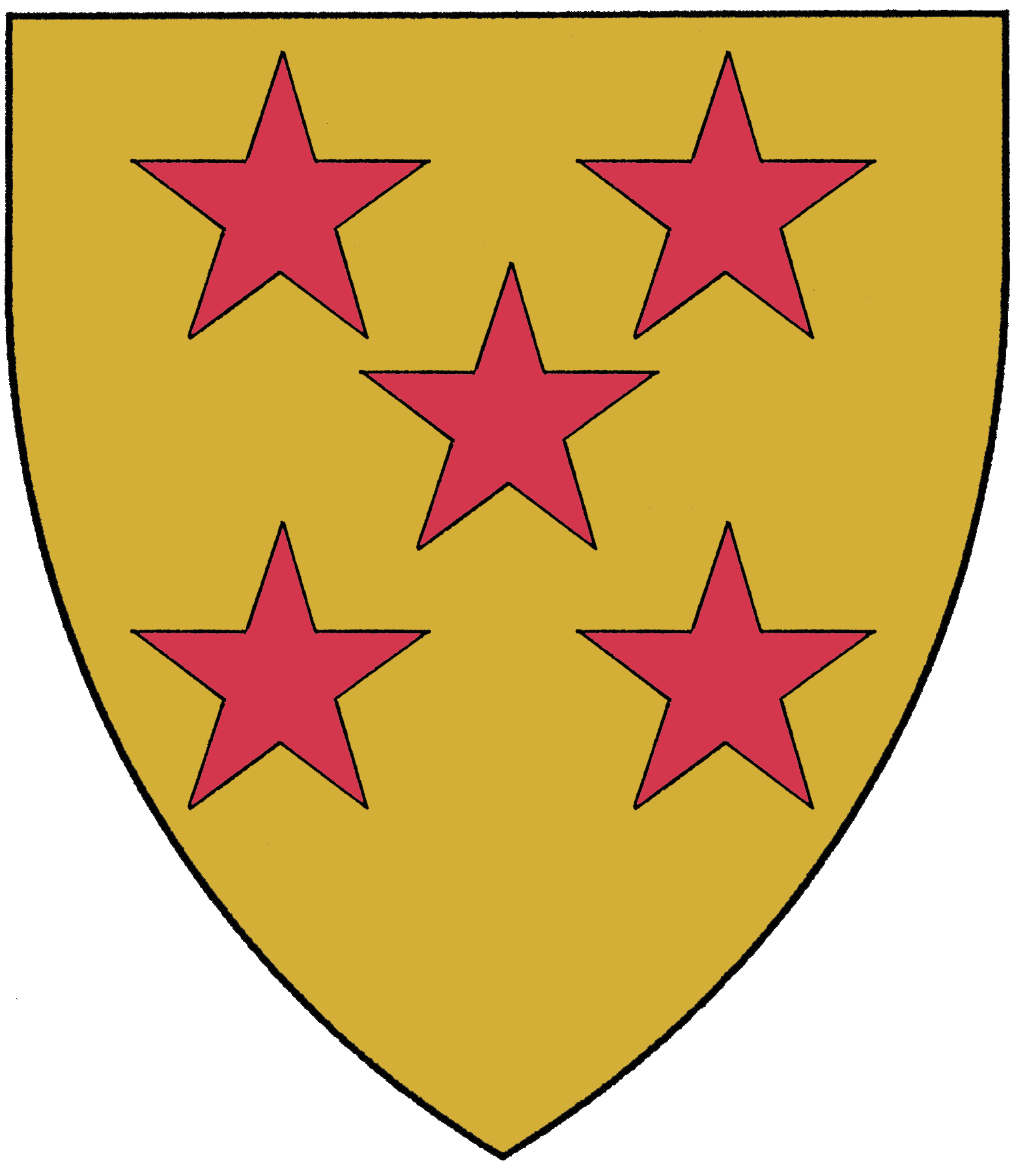
- Origin: Aragon
- Founded: 1263; 763 years ago
- Founder: Abraham Aboab
- Traditions: Judaism (Western Sephardic)

The Aboab family (Hebrew: אבוהב, Abuhav Abuhab; Arabic: ابوآب, Abuwab; Turkish: Abuaf) is an old and distinguished Western Sephardic family, originally from Aragon, Spain. The family has produced several notable rabbis, scholars, physicians, and merchants - especially achieving prominence in Amsterdam, Venice and Hamburg. The progenitor of the family is Rav Abraham Aboab, who, in 1263 was given a tower in Altea, Aragon with the surrounding dairy farms along with a heraldic achievement by James I of Aragon. Some have suggested that Aboab is a spelling of the Arabic "Abdelwahab", which means "the benefactor’s servant", while others have stated that it derives from the town of Umm al-Abohav in Tunisia.

== History ==
The family progenitor Abraham Aboab had one son, Isaac Aboab I, who was a Talmudic scholar in Aragon. He later moved to Toledo, Castile, where he headed his own yeshiva, teaching Jewish ethics. He is best known for his work Menorat haMaor "Lamp of Illumination", which is a collection of midrashic sermons. His son, Abraham II, was a close contemporary of Judah ben Asher and Abraham II's great-grandson Isaac Aboab of Castile, was a posek and Torah commentator in Toledo. Following the Alhambra Decree of 1492, he with thirty others of the most respected Jews of the land went to Lisbon in order to negotiate with King John II of Portugal for the reception of his banished coreligionists. He and his companions were allowed to settle under favourable conditions in Porto, Portugal. However, his son Abraham Aboab IV was the victim of forced conversion in 1497 and thus he and all his descendants became Crypto-Jews. In the early 17th century the majority of the family immigrated to Western Europe. With Elijah Aboab Cardoso, and Abraham Aboab V in Hamburg. Immanuel Aboab, Isaac ben Mattathiah Aboab, and Isaac Aboab da Fonseca in Amsterdam, and Samuel Aboab and his son Jacob Aboab in Venice.

== Family tree ==
- Rabbi Abraham Aboab (fl. 1263)
  - Rabbi Isaac Aboab (fl. 1300)
    - Rabbi Abraham Aboab II (fl. 1340)
      - Rabbi Judah Aboab (b. 1360)
        - Rabbi Abraham Aboab III (b. 1400)
          - Rabbi Isaac Aboab II (1433 - 1493)
            - Rabbi Abraham Aboab IV, alias Duarte Dias (1470 - 1550)
              - Rabbi Menasseh Aboab (1519 - 1600)
                - Rabbi Abraham Aboab V (d. 1642)
                  - Rabbi Samuel Aboab (1610 - 1694)
                    - Rabbi Jacob Aboab VI (d. 1727)
                      - Rabbi Abraham Aboab VI (d. 1760)
                        - Rabbi Samuel Aboab II (b. 1705)
              - Rabbi Isaac Aboab III, alias Henrique Gomes (b. 1520)
                - Rabbi Immanuel Aboab (1555 - 1628)
              - Rabbi Jacob Aboab II (d. 1604)
                - Rabbi David Aboab (1570 - 1612)
                  - Rabbi Isaac Aboab da Fonseca (1605 - 1693)
                    - Rabbi David Aboab da Fonseca (b. 1643)
              - Miguel Dias (b. 1525)
                - Duarte Dias (1555 - 1603)
                  - Rabbi Mattathiah de Isaac Aboab (1594 - 1667)
                    - Rabbi Isaac de Mattathiah Aboab (1631 - 1707)
                      - Rabbi Mattathiah de Isaac Aboab II

== See also ==
- Abuhav, and other variants of the surname
