= Abuhav =

Abuhav or Abuhab (Hebrew: אבוהב, Arabic: ابوآب, romanized: Abuwab, Abuab, Aboab, Turkish: Aboaf) is a Jewish surname associated with the old Western Sephardic Aboab family.

Other notable people with the surname include:

- Nicolás Bellizia Aboaf (born 1969), Mexican politician
- Rotem Abuhav (born 1976), Israeli actress

== See also ==
- Abuhav Synagogue
