= Abraham Gabbai Ysidro =

Spanish rabbi

Abraham Gabbay Ysidro or Isidro (died London, 1755) was a Spanish Marrano Sephardi rabbi. In Spain his first wife called Sarah was tried by the Inquisition while he escaped to London and then was hakam in Amsterdam, then Surinam, returning finally to London. A sermon, Amsterdam 1724 includes details of his life, and a kabbalistic poem Yad Avraham "The hand of Abraham" on the Azharot, which was published after his death in Amsterdam in 1758 by his second wife, also called Sarah, who had settled in Bayonne.
