= Isaac ben Mattathiah Aboab =

Rabbi Isaac ben Mattathiah Aboab (Hebrew: רבי יצחק בן מתתיה אבוהב; d. 1720) also known as Isaac Aboab V an early 18th-century rabbinic scholar and hakam of the Portuguese congregation in Amsterdam.

Born around 1650 in Amsterdam, Netherlands. His father Mattathiah Aboab was a representative of the congregation Bet Jacob. Mattathiah was a cousin and contemporary of Isaac da Fonseca Aboab and often confounded with him. In his early years Aboab became a friend of the learned William Surenhuysius. Later writing a book of exhortation and admonition for his son, which appeared at Amsterdam, in 1687, under the title "Exortação Paraque os Tementes do Senhor na Observança dos Preceitos de sua S. Ley." A number of his works exist in manuscript, among them a genealogy of the Aboab family and a "Comedia de la Vida y Successos de Josseph." He died about 1720 at Amsterdam.
