= Moses Frankfurter =

Rabbi and printer of Amsterdam

Dayan Moses Frankfurter
- משה פרנקפורט
- Title: rabbi

Personal life
- Born: Moses ben Simon Frankfurter; 1672
- Died: 1762 (aged 89–90)
- Parent: Simeon Frankfurter (father)
- Other name: Aaron Frankfurter

Religious life
- Religion: Judaism
- Profession: Printer

Rabbi Moses Frankfurter (Hebrew: משה פרנקפורט; 1672 – 1762), later known as Aaron Frankfurter, was a Jewish Dayan who moved to Amsterdam where he established himself as a printer, writer, and translator.

== Biography ==
Frankfurter was born in 1672 to the family of rabbi Simeon Frankfurter. The family established themselves in Amsterdam in 1700, where Moses Frankfurter would remain for most of his life. Beginning in 1701, Frankfurter began writing religious commentaries in Hebrew and Yiddish.

Frankfurter's father, rabbi Simeon died in the city on December 9, 1712. Two years later, Frankfurter would write two works based on his father's seminal work Dine Semaḥot, a gloss to expand on it and an abridgment of the original work.

In 1720 Frankfurter established a printing press in Amerstdam to print Hebrew and Yiddish texts. At this point he had already become a rabbi himself, and had also taken the position as a dayan on the local ashkenazi beth din. He would use this press to help address the shortage of Babylonian Talmuds in Amerstdam, publishing individual tractates while the next Talmud edition was in progress.

Talmud page printed by Moses Frankfurter

Frankfurter also used his printing press to publish a rabbinic bible between the years of 1724 – 1728.

Frankfurter died in 1762. It appears from his epitaph that Frankfurter assumed the name 'Aaron' in his old age. There are some claims that he had relocated to Frankfurt shortly before his death.

== Written Works ==
Frankfurter both used his printing press in Amsterdam to publish his own works as well as those of others. He was the author of translations as well as commentaries, including:

- Nefesh Yehudah (1701, Hebrew: נפש יהודה, lit. 'Soul of Judah'), a commentary on Rabbi Isaac Aboab's Menorat Ha-Maor
- Zeh Yenaḥamenu (1712, Hebrew: זֶה יְנַחֲמֵנוּ, lit. 'This one will comfort us'), a commentary on the Mekilta
- Sefer ha-Ḥayyim (1714, Hebrew: ספר החיים, lit. 'Book of Life'), a retranslated compilation of his father's two part Dine Semaḥot, using both Hebrew and Yiddish as the original had, on topics relating to Jewish deathbed rituals and mourning practices
- Sha'ar Shim'on (1714, Hebrew: שַׁעַר שִׁמְעוֹן, lit. 'Gate of Simeon'), an abridged compendium of the Sefer ha-Ḥayyim that was meant to be more navigable for those dealing with the deathly ill

Frankfurter also edited for other writers who would publish through him. Often being tasked with adding glosses on biblic commentaries and halachic works. He also was involved with creating a rabbinic bible in 1724, by the name of Sefer Kehilloth Moshe, which were based on the Bomberg printings.
