= Jacob Raphael Fürstenthal =

German Jewish poet and writer (1781–1855)

Jacob Raphael Fürstenthal (born in Glogau 1781; died at Breslau, February 16, 1855) was a German Jewish poet, translator, and Hebrew writer.

Fürstenthal's attention was directed chiefly toward the modernization of Jewish religious services, both in and out of the synagogue, and to this end he translated into German the most important liturgical books. These versions became very popular among the German Jews; and, in spite of many subsequent translations, they have retained their popularity to the present time. To some of them, as, for instance, the Penitential Prayers, he added Hebrew commentaries.

He did much work in philosophical and exegetical literature. His German translations of and Hebrew commentaries to the Moreh Nebukim of Moses Maimonides and the Ḥobot ha-Lebabot of Baḥya ibn Paḳuda, and especially his large Hebrew commentary to the whole Bible, evidence his great versatility in Talmudic and Midrashic literature.

Fürstenthal's main importance, however, lies in his Hebrew poetry. His poetic productions have a classic ring, and are distinguished by diction, richness of thought, and feeling. His power shows itself in his "Song on Zion" ("Ha-Meassef," 1810, iv. 37), which is considered the best of his poems. In German, too, Fürstenthal showed talent in his rhythmical translations of various piyyuṭim, as, for example, his translation of the pizmon in the minḥah prayer for the Day of Atonement.

== Works ==
The following is a complete list of Fürstenthal's writings in their chronological order:

- various contributions to "Ha-Meassef," 1810-11
- contributions to "Resise ha-Meliẓah," a collection of poems and epigrams, Breslau, 1820–22
- "Paradigmen der Hebräischen Conjugationen und Declinationen," ib. 1826
- Seliḥot, translated into German together with a Hebrew commentary ("Meṭib Safah"), to which is added a description (in German) of the service of the high priest in the Sanctuary on the Day of Atonement, ib. 1826
- "Ha-Meassef," containing Hebrew and German poems, mostly his own, ib. 1829, 1832
- "Dabar be-'Itto," an ode in German and Hebrew written on the cessation of an epidemic of cholera, ib. 1832
- "Das Judenthum in Staatsbürgerlicher Beziehung," ib. 1832
- "Rabbinische Anthologie," ib. 1834
- "Die Männer Gottes, oder Biblische Charakteristik," a translation of M. B. Friedenthal's "Yesod ha-Dat," Berlin, 1835
- German translation of the "Ḥobot ha-Lebabot," with a Hebrew commentary ("Or la-Yesharim."), Breslau, 1835
- "Ebel Yaḥid," an elegy on the death of Akiba Eger, ib. 1838
- German translation of the "Moreh Nebukim," with a Hebrew commentary (first part only), Krotoschin, 1839 (an appendix to this work was published by Fürstenthal, Leipzig, 1839)
- Bible, under the general title "Or le-Yisrael," with Hebrew commentary ("Bi'ur we-Som Sekel"), Krotoschin, 1839–43
- German translation of "Ḳol Sason," liturgies for Purim and the fast of Esther, containing also a supercommentary ("Pittuḥe Ḥotam") to the commentary of Abraham ibn Ezra on the Book of Esther, ib. 1840 (2d ed., ib. 1845)
- "Mazkeret Ahabah," poem by B. Schweitzer, metrically translated into German, Breslau, 1841
- "Tenubot Sadeh," poems and epigrams by S. N. Rosenfeld, translated into German, ib. 1842
- "Das Jüdische Traditionswesen," a translation of Maimonides' introduction to the Mishnah, with explanatory annotations, ib. 1842
- German translation of "Ma'aneh Lashon," Krotoschin, 1844
- "Menorat ha-Ma'or" by Isaac Aboab, German translation (completed by Benzion Behrend), 3 vols., ib. 1844-48
- German translation of "Ḳol Beki," liturgy for the Ninth of Ab, with a history of the destruction of the Temple, 2d ed., ib. 1845
- German translation of Maḥzor for all festivals, under the general title "Minḥah Ḥadashah," 3 vols., ib. 1845.
