= Menahem Azariah da Fano =

Italian rabbi and scholar (1548–1620)

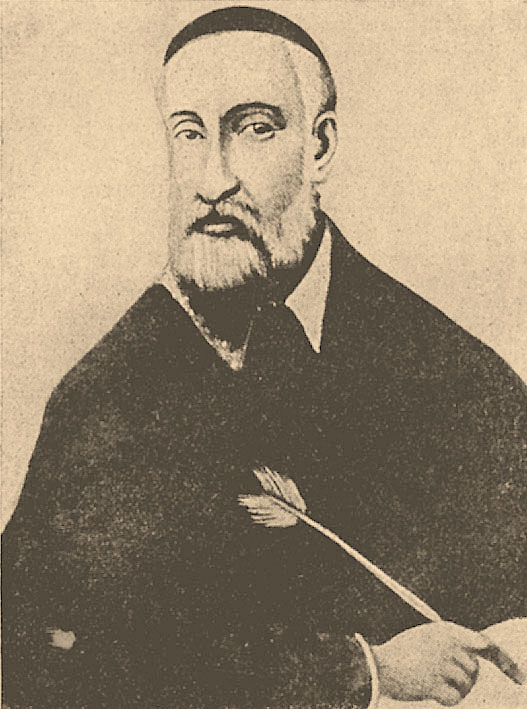
- Menahem Azariah da Fano

Personal life
- Born: 1548 Fano, Papal States
- Died: 1620 (aged 71–72) Mantua, Duchy of Mantua

Religious life
- Religion: Judaism

Menahem Azariah da Fano (also called Immanuel da Fano, and Rema MiPano (Hebrew: רמ״ע מפאנו) (1548 – 1620) was an Italian rabbi, Talmudist, and Kabbalist.

== Life ==
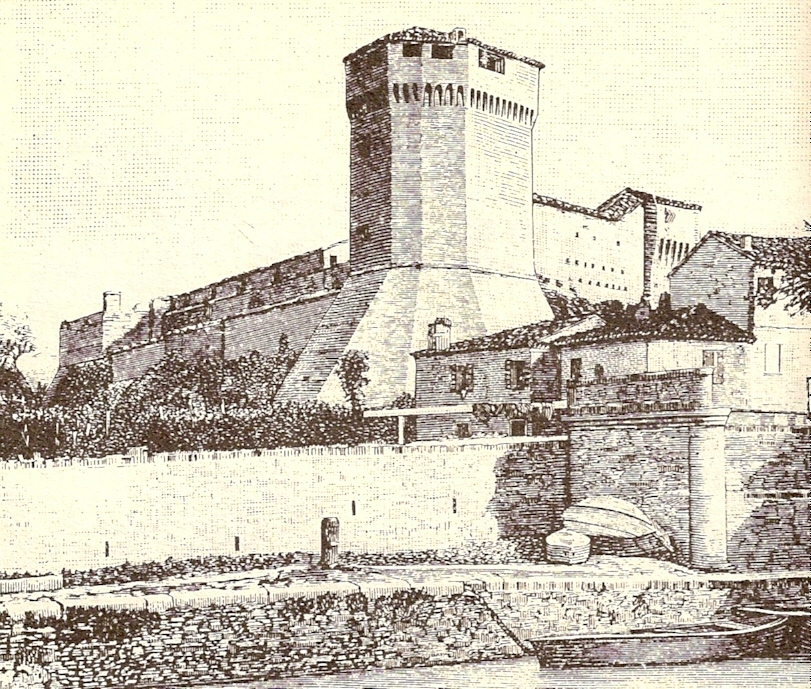
The Castle of Fano in a 19th-century etching. The high watchtower was destroyed during World War II.

He was a disciple of Rabbi Moses ben Jacob Cordovero, to whose widow he offered 1,000 sequins for her husband's manuscripts. Even as a youth, Fano had some reputation for learning, as is shown by the fact that Moses Cordovero (d. 1570) sent him a copy of his Pardes Rimmonim. Another one of Fano's teachers was Ishmael Ḥanina b. Mordecai of Valmontone.

Fano was a patron of learning. When Rabbi Joseph Caro, shortly before his death (1575), sent Kesef Mishneh, his commentary on Maimonides' Yad ha-Ḥazaḳah, to Mantua for publication, Fano, at the suggestion of Dei Rossi, assumed part of the expense and took charge of the edition.

According to a report of Immanuel Aboab, Fano lived for some time in Reggio Emilia. Numerous pupils flocked to him from Italy and Germany, and he was held in general respect for his learning and character.

One of Fano's sons was Isaac Berechiah; and the same name was borne also by Fano's son-in-law and pupil (mentioned in a letter of Israel Sforno to his son Obadiah ben Israel Sforno).

== Works ==
Fano's authority as a Talmudist is evident in a collection of responsa ("She'elot Teshubot me-Rabbi Menaḥem 'Azaryah," Dyhernfurth, 1788) containing 130 chapters on various subjects connected with religious law and ritual questions. They are distinguished by precision of style as well as by the author's independence of the later authorities. He even decides sometimes in opposition to Joseph Caro (e.g., No. 32), and holds changes in the ritual to be justifiable in certain cases (see, e.g., No. 25).

In his love for precision and brevity, Fano compiled a book of extracts from Alfasi's code, which itself is only a compendium of the Talmud. This book is preserved in manuscript. Chaim Yosef David Azulai enumerates twenty-four kabbalistic treatises by Fano, some of which are in manuscript. Ten of these are comprised in the work "'Asarah Ma'amarot"; five of them, under the title "Amarot Ṭehorot," were printed together with "Ḳol Yehudah," a philosophical commentary by Judah ben Simon (Frankfort-on-the-Main, 1698; Mohilev, 1810). These treatises originated partly in addresses delivered by the author on holidays, especially on Rosh Hashanah.

In spite of Fano's decided tendency toward scholastic and allegorical interpretation, his works are not devoid of original remarks. For example, in connection with the kabbalistic interpretation of Numbers 33:2, "And Moses wrote their goings out according to their journeys," he says: "The Torah speaks always of ideas when it seems to be describing concrete things: the higher meaning is the principal thing; the lower, material meaning holds the second place. Nahmanides, indeed, follows another opinion in his commentary on Genesis in holding to the principle that 'the Torah speaks according to the manner of men'; but we can justly say that men speak according to the manner of the Torah."

The following teaching is characteristic of the author's optimism as well as of his mild nature, which attracted the sympathy of all:

"The prohibitions of the Torah never appear in the imperative, but in the form of the future: 'Thou shalt have no other gods'; 'Thou shalt not bow down thyself to other gods'; 'Thou shalt not swear falsely'; etc. This means, 'I know thou wilt not be guilty of these things, since human nature does not tolerate such crimes, and if sin occurs in this life it can be only a passing episode.' On the other hand, the commandments are in the imperative: 'Kabbed,' 'zakor'; that is, 'I command thee nothing new; the good instincts in thee have always been there; they need only to be awakened and developed'"

In 1581, Jedidiah Recanati dedicated to Fano his Italian translation ("Erudizione dei Confusi") of Maimonides 's "Moreh Nebukim." Isaiah Hurwitz especially mentions Fano's treatise "Yonat Elem" as a theological work, the teaching of which comes very near to the truth (Joseph Solomon Delmedigo, introduction to "Nobelot Ḥokmah"). Fano's pupil Samuel Portaleone composed an elegy on the occasion of his death.

== See also ==
- Aaron Berechiah ben Moses ben Nehemiah of Modena
