= Samuel Aboab =

17th-century Western Sephardic rabbi and scholar

- Title: RaShA (רשב"א)

Personal life
- Born: Samuel Aboab; 1610 Hamburg, Germany
- Died: August 22, 1694 (aged 83–84) Venice, Italy
- Spouse: Mazel-Tov Franco
- Children: Abraham Aboab, David Aboab, Jacob Aboab, Joseph Aboab.
- Parents: Abraham Aboab (father); Ana Dinis (mother)
- Dynasty: Aboab

Religious life
- Religion: Judaism

Jewish leader
- Successor: Jacob Aboab
- Dynasty: Aboab

Rabbi Samuel ben Abraham Aboab (Hebrew: רבי שמואל בן אברהם אבוהב; c. 1610 – August 22, 1694) also known by his acronym RaSHA (רש"א, Rabbi Shmuel ben Avraham) was a 17th-century Western Sephardic rabbi and scholar, who is considered to be one of the greatest rabbinic sages of Italy. He served as the av bet din of Venice, where he rose to great prominence due to his vast knowledge of rabbinic literature. He is known for being an adamant opponent of the Sabbatean movement, and an early supporter of the old Yishuv.

== Biography ==
Born into the Aboab family in Hamburg, Germany in 1610. His father Abraham Aboab V, was a former Crypto-Jew and founding father of the Portuguese Jewish community in Hamburg. At age 13, Rabbi Samuel was sent by his father to study in Venice under Rabbi David Franco, whose daughter, Mazzal-Tov Franco he later married at age eighteen. He was soon appointed Chief Rabbi of Verona, where he garnered such a reputation for learning that disciples sought him out, such as Samson Morpurgo and Jacob Hagiz, even the learned rabbis of Italy turned to him with difficult religious questions. Rabbi Samuel was also acquainted with secular learning and knew several languages including Latin, German, Ladino and Italian. After serving as Chief Rabbi of Verona, he was appointed Av Bet Din of Venice in 1650, where he became involved in the controversy concerning Sabbethai Zevi and his apostle, Nathan of Gaza, who confessed to Rabbi Samuel, that his prophecies concerning the Messianic character of Sabbethai Zevi were mere deceptions. Rabbi Samuel was also responsible for obtaining financial support from Jewish communities in Western Europe for the Jewish settlements in the Land of Israel, particularly those in Hebron. In 1643, he collected funds for the ransoming of the Jews of Kremsier taken captive by the Swedes. In his advanced age Rabbi Samuel became the victim of many misfortunes. Domestic troubles and severe illness afflicted him, as well as a dispute with the doge who forced him to leave Venice. It was only shortly before his death that he received permission from the doge to return to the city and to reassume his office, which in his absence had been conducted by his son Joseph, who later immigrated to Hebron. Rabbi Samuel died on August 22, 1694, in Venice. His son Jacob Aboab, was also a prominent rabbi in Venice, whose descendants eventually settled in Turkey.

== Works ==
Rabbi Samuel's works provide important accounts of the atmosphere and day-to-day life of 17th century Italian Jewry. Those works include:

- Devar Shmuel (דבר שמואל) (lit. 'Words of Samuel') - Widely considered to be Rabbi Samuel's magnum opus, the work was published by his son Jacob in 1702 in Venice. It is an extensive responsa which discusses a variety of halakic issues. The preface of the work is a biography and his ethical will to his sons, in which he tells his four sons, to never pronounce carelessly the name of God, to be scrupulously honest in all their dealings, to never to calumniate, to never to give any one a contemptuous appellation or nickname, to care for the education of the young, and to attend synagogue daily. The work also has an appendix called "Zikkaron li-Venei Yisrael" which is an investigation of Nathan of Gaza.
- Sefer ha-Zikhronot (ספר הזכרונות) (lit. 'Book of Remembrance') - Published by Rabbi Samuel in Prague around 1650, the work contains ten principles on the fulfillment of the commandments in hopes of inspiring the masses to observe the mitzvoth and avoid transgressions that are usually underestimated.

Two more of his works, Mazkeret ha-Gittin and Tikkun Soferim, exist in manuscript.
