= Simeon Frankfurter =

- שמעון פרנקפורט
- Title: Rabbi

Personal life
- Born: Simon ben Israel Judah; 1634 Schwerin, Poland
- Died: December 9, 1712 (aged 77–78) Amsterdam, Dutch Republic
- Children: Moses Frankfurter (son)
- Occupation: chevra kadisha

Religious life
- Religion: Judaism

Jewish leader
- Main work: Sefer HaHayiim
- Yahrtzeit: 10 Kislev 5363

Rabbi Simeon Frankfurter (Hebrew: שמעון פרנקפורט; 1634 – Dec. 9, 1712) was a prominent Dutch rabbinic scholar. His main work was written in both Hebrew and Yiddish as a two part work. It was later republished by his son, Moses Frankfurter, with additional commentaries.

== Biography ==
Frankfurter was born in 1634 in Schwerin, Poland.

In 1656, during the Swedish Invasion of Poland, Frankfurter left the country. As he left, he adopted his father-in-law, rabbi Benjamin Frankfurt's, surname. He cited a decree of death issued by the government as the main reason for his emigration. It is not clear if he was referring to a personal decree or a broader one. Likely he was referring to the Polish pogroms during the period.

Frankfurter arrived in Amsterdam shortly before the French began to threaten the city in 1672. He would become close with rabbi Benjamin Jedid, who's daughter he would marry. Through this connection, Frankfurter also was able to quickly begin serving as a rabbi of Amsterdam’s Ashkenazi chevra kadisha, a position he held for 38 years. By 1672 itself, Frankfurter and his wife had their son Moses Frankfurter, who would go on to be a rabbi and printer of significance to the city.

Due to his work with the chevra kadisha, Frankfurter became an expert on practices relating to Jewish mourning and taking care of the sick. He would study the Geonim on this topic and eventually write several prayers and medical remedies. This would culminate in 1703 with his primary written work the Sefer HaHayiim.

Frankfurter died in Amsterdam on Dec. 9, 1712. His yahrzeit is 10 Kislev 5363.

== Written Works ==
Frankfurter main work was the Sefer HaHayiim, it was a two volume halachic work on Jewish deathbed rituals and taking care of the sick that was published in Amsterdam in 1703. It was a bilingual work, the first volume in Hebrew and the second in Yiddish. His son, Moses Frankfurter, would devote many energies to expand on this work with both annotated expansions and practical abridged versions. The book was later translated to German in 1843 and English in 1847 by Carl Rehfuss and Benjamin Ascher, respectively.

Frankfurter also wrote a halachic work called Sefer yitnu and penned poems for several occasions for his son.
