= Markus Bär Friedenthal =

German banker (1779–1859)

M. B. Friedenthal

Markus Bär Friedenthal (born 23 June 1779, Groß Glogau — 3/8 December 1859, Breslau) was a German Jewish banker and scholar.

Although one of the leading bankers at Breslau, he devoted much time to study and to communal affairs. His special interest lay in the field of religious philosophy and dogma, which he treated rather in an apologetic than in a purely scientific manner. His works nevertheless revealed great sagacity, and had the merit, coming as they did from a conservative, of opening to the Talmudists the field of modern critical studies.

== Literary works ==
- 'Iḳḳare Emunah, on the dogmas of Jewish religion, proving that Mosaism is in accordance with the aims of humanity (Breslau, 3 vols., 1816-1818);
- Yesod ha-Dat, a characterization of Jewish law (ib. 7 vols., 1821-23)
- Mishpaṭ ha-Aḥizah we-Mishpaṭ ha-Zekiyyah, on the law of property, a summary of the preceding work (ib. 1838)
- Miktab le-Ḥakme Yisrael, an open letter to Jewish scholars concerning Jewish dogmas (ib. 1825)
- Ma'amar Mordekai, a defense of the institutions of the great synagogue at Breslau, with notes on the use and form of the prayers (ib. 1834);
- Ha-Ḥokmah, ha-Tebunah, weha-Dat, on intelligence, comprehension, and religion, in 4 parts (ib. 1843-46)

Several of these works were translated into German by J. R. Fürstenthal and by Wilhelm Freund. Friedenthal was also the author of many pamphlets written in German, dealing with the communal affairs of Breslau.

== Bibliography of Jewish Encyclopedia ==
- Allg. Zeit. des Jud. 1860, No. 1
