= Abraham Aboab =

13th-century Spanish Jewish aristocrat

Rav Abraham Aboab (Hebrew: אברהם אבוהב; fl. 1263) was a 13th-century Spanish Jewish aristocrat and founder of the Aboab family. Possibly born in Pelof, Aragon, not much is known of his early life. It seems that Aboab developed a very close relationship with James I of Aragon, who in 1263 gifted Aboab a tower called Altea, with the surrounding dairy farms and all rights and privileges of ownership along with a heraldic achievement "Or, Five mullets placed in saltire gules". This was quite unprecedented for a 13th-century Jew, and demonstrates the tolerant attitude of James I of Aragon. Aboab had one son Isaac Aboab I, who was a notable Talmudic scholar.
