= Abraham Aboab IV =

15th-century Crypto-Jew

Rabbi Abraham Aboab IV (Hebrew: רבי אברהם בן יצחק אבוהב השני; d. 1550) was a 15th-century Crypto-Jew and progenitor of the modern Aboab family.

Born around 1470 in Toledo, Castile, the son of Isaac Aboab II. In his later life, Abraham raised his grandson, Immanuel Aboab because his father Isaac died at a young age. Abraham negotiated with the Portuguese authorities for the entrance of the Castilian refugees into the country and was subsequently a victim of forced conversion in 1497, having to change his name to "Duarte Dias". All his grandchildren reverted to the surname "Aboab" when they left Portugal. Abraham probably acted as a community leader for the disfranchised Portuguese Jews, up until his death in 1550 in Porto.
