= Jacob Aboab =

Italian rabbi and scholar (died 1727)

Rabbi Jacob ben Samuel Aboab (Hebrew: רבי יעקב בן שמואל אבוהב; died 1727) was an Italian rabbi and scholar. He is the son of Samuel Aboab.

Born into the Aboab family around 1650 in Venice, Italy. His father Samuel Aboab was the Av Bet Din of Venice. A position which Rabbi Jacob occupied after his father's death in 1694. He edited and published, at the expense of his wealthy elder brother, David, publishing a collection of his father's works known as "Devar Shmuel" in 1702. He paid especial attention to Biblical antiquities and natural science and conducted an active literary correspondence with Theophil Unger, a pastor, who was an enthusiastic collector of Hebrew manuscripts. Aboab also maintained, from 1682 to 1692, a scientific correspondence with the learned imperial councilor Job Ludolf, at Frankfort-on-the-Main. Lastly, Rabbi Jacob wrote a number of rabbinical decisions, which are preserved in the works of others such as "Pahad Yizhak" by Isaac Lampronti. Rabbi Jacob died in 1727 in Venice. His son Abraham, was also a rabbinic scholar in Salonica, whose descendants settled in Turkey.
