= Isaac Aboab I =

14th-century Spanish Talmudic scholar

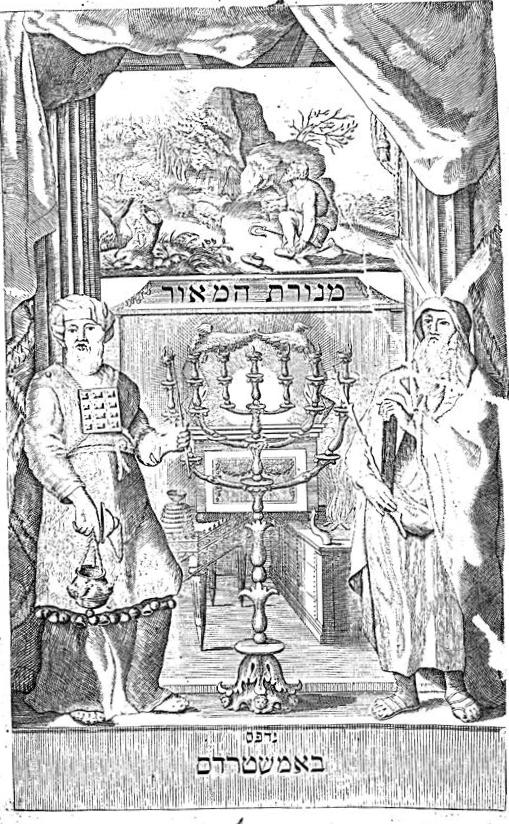
- Front page of Menorat ha-Maor, Amsterdam, 1721

Personal life
- Born: Isaac Aboab Aragon
- Died: Toledo, Spain
- Children: Abraham Aboab II
- Parent: Abraham Aboab (father)
- Dynasty: Aboab

Religious life
- Religion: Judaism

Jewish leader
- Main work: Menorat ha-Maor
- Dynasty: Aboab

Rabbi Isaac ben Abraham Aboab (Hebrew: רבי יצחק בן אברהם אבוהב; fl. 1300), commonly known in connection with his magnum opus Menorat ha-Maor (Hebrew: מנורת המאור; "Candlestick of Light"), was a Spanish Talmudic scholar, Kabbalist, and Jewish rabbinic writer. He belonged to a prominent Sephardic family that produced several distinguished scholars. He is known for his intellectual approach to rabbinic literature, which he juxtaposed with contemporary Spanish Kabbalah.

Aboab's principal work, Menorat ha-Maor, became widely popular and was composed "for the ignorant and the learned, the foolish and the wise, the young and the old, for men and for women". Taking the seven-branched candlestick as its organizing image, Aboab employed traditional aggadic material to illustrate seven themes: guarding against evil feelings; guarding against evil speech; observing mitzvot; studying the Torah; repentance; cultivating shālōm; and humility. He drew upon a wide range of aggadic sources and quoted passages from numerous works that are now lost.

== Biography ==
Probably born in Aragon, his father Rav Abraham Aboab, had a close relationship with the Crown of Aragon, being gifted land and a heraldic achievement by James I of Aragon in 1263. In his early years Rabbi Isaac worked as a merchant, later moving to Toledo, Castile around 1300. In Toledo, he headed his own yeshiva, and amongst his pupils was Jacob Berab. He mostly taught Jewish ethics, later serving in the rabbinate in Toledo. Towards the end of his life, he devoted much of his time to literary work and to preaching, as he found that great Talmudic scholars and important seats of learning of his time to be antiquated. In his time, the Jews for whom he wrote still understood and spoke Arabic and he belonged to a period of intellectual decline when men took naturally to eclecticism. He combined extensive rabbinical knowledge with philosophical erudition, and was fond of mystic interpretation of the Mosaic laws and ceremonies. He often quoted Aristotle and Plato, though only from secondary sources, and endeavored to illustrate passages from the Talmud and the midrashic literature, with which he was especially familiar. He is sometimes confused with his great-great-grandson Isaac Aboab II, who was a bible commentator in Castile in the late 15th century.

== Works ==
Aboab wrote three books:

1. Aron Ha-Edut (Hebrew: ארון העדות, lit. 'Ark of the Covenant') - The work traces various ritual laws to their Talmudic sources, as well as the decisions of the Geonim and later interpretations. It is divided (following the Ten Commandments) into ten sections, each subdivided into chapters and paragraphs.
2. Shulḥan Ha-Panim (Hebrew: שלחן הפנים, lit. 'the Table of the Showbread') - The work relates to the prayers and benedictions. It is divided into twelve sections, symbolizing the twelve loaves of the showbread in the Tabernacle. Both works are lost.
3. Menorat Ha-Maor (Hebrew: מנורת המאור, lit. 'The Menorah of Light') - The work is a collection of midrashic sermons.

=== Menorat haMaor ===
Menorat haMaor has survived and won considerable fame for the author, though in his humility he assures his readers that he composed it chiefly for his own use as a public speaker. But besides this it has contributed probably more than any other medieval book to the popularization of rabbinical lore and to the religious edification and elevation of the masses. It belongs to that class of ethical works which sprang up in the 13th century in a time of reaction against the one-sided manner in which Talmudic studies had been previously pursued.

Aboab says in the preface of this work, "These Talmudists consider it their duty to propose difficult questions and answer them in a witty and subtle manner, but leave unnoticed the precious pearls that lie upon the bed of the Talmudic ocean, the aggadic passages (similar to Midrash) so rich in beauty and sweetness." He conceived, therefore, the plan of grouping together the rich material stored up in the vast treasure-house of Aggadah from the religious and ethical point of view, and of presenting it in a book, intending by it to illumine the minds and the hearts of his coreligionists. Alluding to the seven-armed Menorah in the Tabernacle, he divided the book into seven sections, each of which bears the title of Ner or "Lamp" subdivided into separate parts and chapters. The seven "Nerim" or sections are:

1. "Do not chase after luxuries" - Divided into three sections about jealousy, lust, and respect.
2. "Do not speak sinfully" - Divided into ten sections about frivolousness speech, lying, flattery, slander, humiliation of others, keeping secrets, fighting with others, tiredness, life purpose, and the sin of insulting others.
3. "Keep the commandments" - Divided into ten sections about circumcision, the duty of the father to his son, prayer, honouring Shabbat and Yom Kippur, honouring one's father and mother, marriage, charity, volunteering, honesty in court, and the pursuance of mitzvoth.
4. "Matters of Talmud Torah" - Divided into four sections about the importance of setting time to learn Torah, the reward of learning Torah, Torah wisdom, and the importance of respecting Torah sages.
5. "Repentance" - Divided into three sections about matters of repentance, the days of repentance, and the torment of sin.
6. "Living in peace" - Divided into two sections about respecting others and advice on how to live peacefully.
7. "Humility" - Divided into two sections about the importance of humility and the sin of humiliation.

Aboab’s work fulfilled an important need for the general readership of its time. Its skillful organization of biblical and rabbinic subjects, combined with a tone of earnestness and sincerity, contributed to its widespread appeal among ordinary readers. The work was translated into Spanish and was often read aloud to attentive audiences, particularly to those who were not well versed in Jewish law. As a result, it became a widely known household book among medieval Jews.

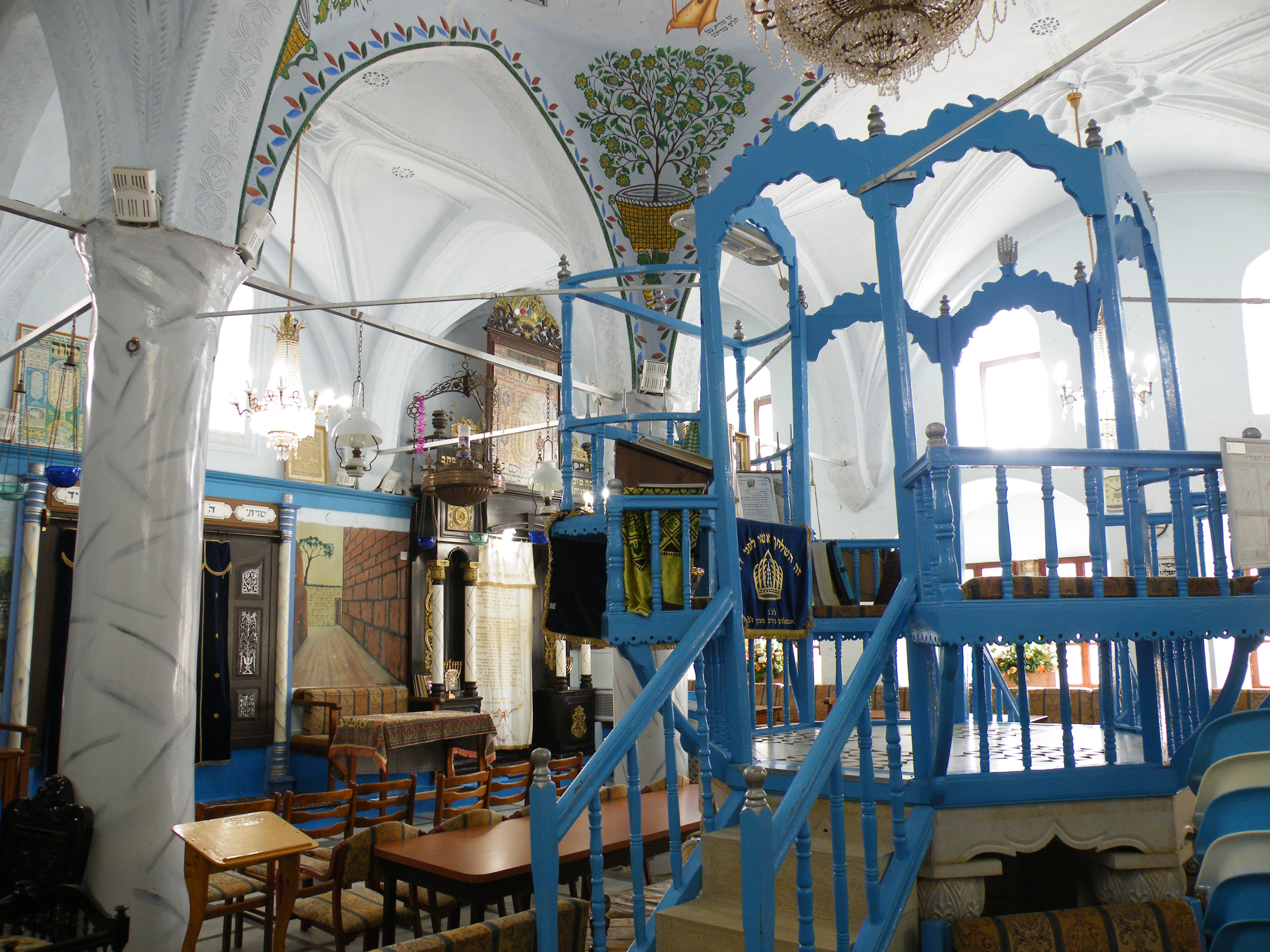
The Abuhav synagogue in Safed, said to be designed by Aboab

It was published with a Spanish translation (Leghorn, 1657), with a Hebrew commentary and a Judæo-German translation by Moses Frankfurter (Amsterdam, 1701), with a modern German translation by Jacob Raphael Fürstenthal and Benzion Behrend (Krotoschin, 1844–46). It was translated also into modern Yiddish, in Wilna, 1880. The book should not be confused with a work of the same name by Israel Alnaqua.

== Abuhav synagogue ==
It is said that after their expulsion from Spain in 1492, Jewish exiles arrived in the Land of Israel carrying a Torah scroll scribed by Rabbi Isaac. Tradition claims that he designed a synagogue while in Spain, incorporating kabbalistic symbols into the design, which served as the building plan for the synagogue named for him in Tsfat, known as the Abuhav Synagogues.

== See also ==
- Menorat ha-Maor - Hebrewbooks
