= Immanuel Aboab =

Personal life
- Born: c. 1555 Porto, Portugal
- Died: 1628 Venice, Republic of Venice

Religious life
- Religion: Judaism

Immanuel Aboab (c. 1555 – 1628) was a Portuguese Jewish scholar. He was a great-grandson of Isaac Aboab of Castile (died 1493).

== Life ==
Born at Porto, he early became an orphan and was reared by his grandfather Abraham Aboab. He emigrated to Italy, and after living some time at Pisa he moved to Corfu, where he became acquainted with Orazio del Monte, a nephew of the duke of Urbino.

In Reggio Emilia he became acquainted with Menahem Azariah da Fano; thence he went to Spoleto and elsewhere in Italy, and finally settled at Venice. Here he had occasion, in 1603, to defend his correligionists.

He died in Venice in 1628.

== Works ==
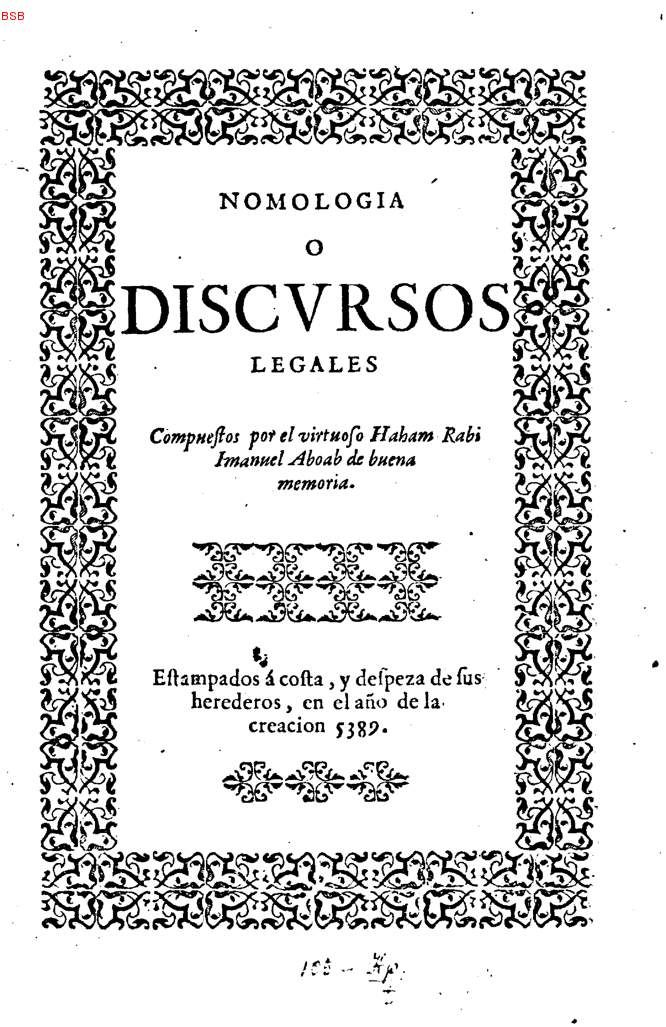
Nomologia o Discursos Legales (1629).

Aboab had the intention of going to Palestine and publishing there his works, The Kingdom of the Intellect and The Foundations of Truth, which he had written in defense of the Talmud. He was the author of a defense of the traditional law and of a chronological list of that law's exponents. He worked at this treatise, which was much prized by the pious, for ten years, and completed it in 1625. It was published by his heirs at Amsterdam, in 1629 (2d ed., ibid., 1727), under the title Nomologia o Discursos Legales, Compuestos por el Virtuose Hakam Rabi Imanuel Aboab de Buena Memoria. A manuscript of this work exists in the library of the Historical Academy in Madrid.
