= Isaac Aboab da Fonseca =

Sephardi rabbi (1605–1693)

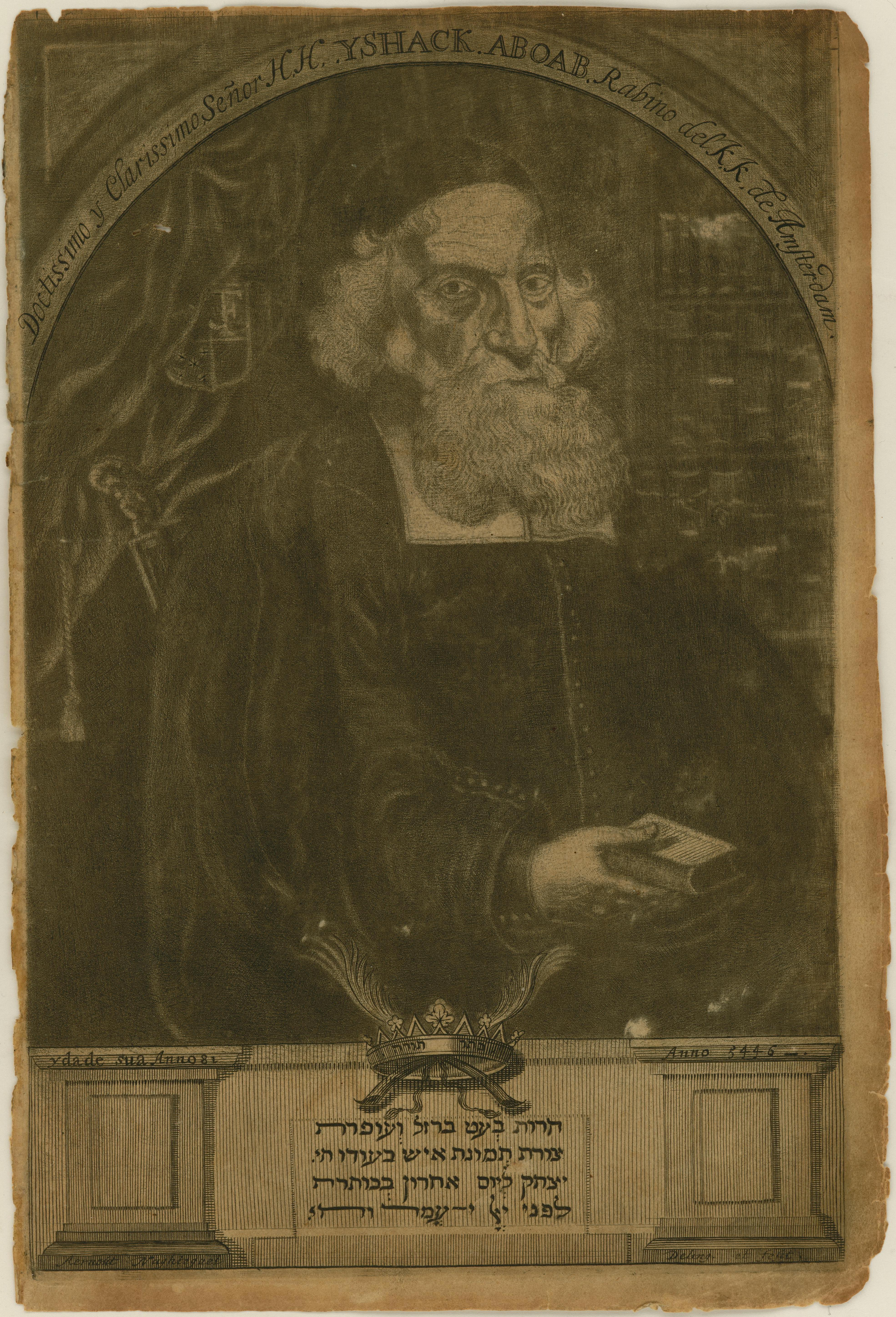
- Portrait of Rabbi Isaac Aboab da Fonseca. This work is a translation of the Pentateuch into Spanish, with a commentary by Rabbi Fonseca. It was prepared for Jews in Dutch Brazil, who because of their Iberian heritage would be able to read Portuguese.

Personal life
- Born: Simão da Fonseca; February 1, 1605 Castro Daire, Portugal
- Died: April 4, 1693 (aged 88) Amsterdam, Netherlands
- Children: Judth Aboab da Fonseca and Rabbi David Aboab da Fonseca
- Parents: David Aboab (father); Isabel da Fonseca (mother)
- Dynasty: Aboab

Religious life
- Religion: Judaism
- Synagogue: Kahal Zur Israel Synagogue
- Position: Rabbi
- Began: 1642
- Ended: 1654
- Dynasty: Aboab

Isaac Aboab da Fonseca (or Isaak Aboab Foonseca) (February 1, 1605 – April 4, 1693) was a rabbi, scholar, kabbalist, and religious writer. In 1656, he was one of several elders within the Portuguese-Jewish community in Amsterdam and for a time in Dutch Brazil before the Portuguese reconquest. He was one of the religious leaders who excommunicated philosopher Baruch Spinoza in 1656.

== Life ==
Isaac Aboab da Fonseca was born into the Aboab family in the Portuguese town of Castro Daire as Simão da Fonseca. His family and parents were Conversos, Jews who had been forcibly converted to Christianity. Although the family had ostensibly converted to Christianity, this did not put an end to local antisemitic suspicions. In 1581, the Dutch Republic secceded from the Spanish Empire, this caused significant immigration of Sepheradic Jews to the Netherlands. In 1603 it was made legal in the Netherlands to practice Judaism in the open. In 1612 When Isaac was seven, the family moved to Amsterdam. From that moment on, the family "reconverted" back to Judaism, and Isaac was raised as a Jew from that moment on. Together with Manasseh ben Israel, he studied under the scholar, doctor, poet and mathematician Isaac Uziel, Uziel would open a talmudic school of his own. Aboab and ben Israel disagreed in 1629 about writings by Joseph Solomon Delmedigo and there were lingering ill-feelings.

At the age of eighteen, Isaac was appointed hakham (rabbi) for Beth Israel, one of three Sephardic communities in Amsterdam, which later merged. In order to be distinguished from his cousin Isaac ben Mattathiah Aboab, he added his mother's last name (da Fonseca) to his own.

In 1642, Aboab da Fonseca was invited by Moses Cohen Henriques appointed rabbi at Kahal Zur Israel Synagogue in Recife, in Pernambuco, Dutch Brazil. Portuguese Jews from Amsterdam were a significant segment of the European population there. Many had first emigrated to Amsterdam due to persecution by the Portuguese Inquisition and opportunities to pursue commerce in the Atlantic World. By becoming the rabbi of the Portuguese Jewish community in Recife, Aboab da Fonseca was also probably one of the first appointed rabbis of the Americas, along with his rabbinic companion Moses Raphael de Aguilar. Kahal Zur Israel congregation had a synagogue, a mikveh and a yeshiva as well, one of the first in the New World. Still during Fonseca's tenure as rabbi in Pernambuco, the Portuguese attacked the Dutch colony. The Portuguese who were animated in part by the Jesuit priest who said "have their open synagogues there, to the scandal of Christianity" calling for the reconquest of the colony and the destruction of the Jews. The Portuguese re-occupied the capital of Recife in 1654, after a struggle of nine years. The Jews fought alongside the Dutch army which refused to surrender until the Portuguese guaranteed they would allow the safe passage of Jews. Aboab then returned to Amsterdam. Some members of his community immigrated to North America and were among the founders of New Amsterdam.

Back in Amsterdam, Aboab da Fonseca was appointed Chief Rabbi for the Sephardic community. In 1656, he was one of several scholars who excommunicated philosopher Baruch Spinoza, whom Aboab knew first as a student in the yeshiva and then in the evening discussions which Saul Levi Morteira, Menasseh, and Aboab oversaw.

Aboab had mystical kabbalistic leanings, publishing texts on it. He was one of many fervent Sephardic supporters in Amsterdam 1665-66 of messianic figure Sabbatai Zevi, until Sabbatai's apostasy in September 1666.

During the tenure of Aboab da Fonseca, the Sephardi community flourished. The construction of the new Portuguese Synagogue (the Esnoga) was prompted by a sermon delivered by him in 1671. It was inaugurated less than four years later, on August 2, 1675 (10 Av 5435).

Isaac Aboab da Fonseca died in Amsterdam on April 4, 1693, at the age of 88.

== Works ==
Aboab translated from Spanish into Hebrew the works of the kabbalist Abraham Cohen de Herrera, Sha'ar ha-Shamayim and Beit Elohim (Amsterdam, 1655).

== Legacy ==
In 2007, the Jerusalem Institute (Machon Yerushalaim) in Israel published a book about Rabbi Fonseca's works, including the author's expositions about the community of Recife at that time. The book is called Chachamei Recife V'Amsterdam, or The Sages of Recife and Amsterdam. The Dutch historian Franz Leonard Schalkwijk who researched the history of the Jews of the Dutch colony also wrote of Fonseca.

== See also ==
- History of the Jews in the Netherlands
- Manasseh ben Israel
- Marrano
- Sephardic Jews in the Netherlands
- Spanish and Portuguese Jews
