= Joseph ben Tzaddik =

Joseph ben Tzaddik (c. 1417-1487) was a rabbi in Arevalo, in Spain, during the fifteenth century. He was the author of a treatise entitled Zeker Ẓaddiḳ, on ritual matters, in fifty chapters, which by 1900 was still in manuscript. The last chapter contains a chronicle of Jewish worthies from the Creation down to the day of the writer; the last entry being dated 1487. A few of the events near or in his own time are treated somewhat fully. The rest is made up of names and dates which are often distorted, both by the author and by the writer of the manuscript. Nearly all the data given in the historical chapter are found in the Yuḥasin of Abraham Zacuto. According to Neubauer (who printed the chapter in his 1887 work Mediaeval Jewish Chronicles, i. 85-100), the two authors drew from a common source.
