= Abuhav Synagogue =

Synagogue in Safed, Israel

- Hebrew: בית הכנסת אבוהב
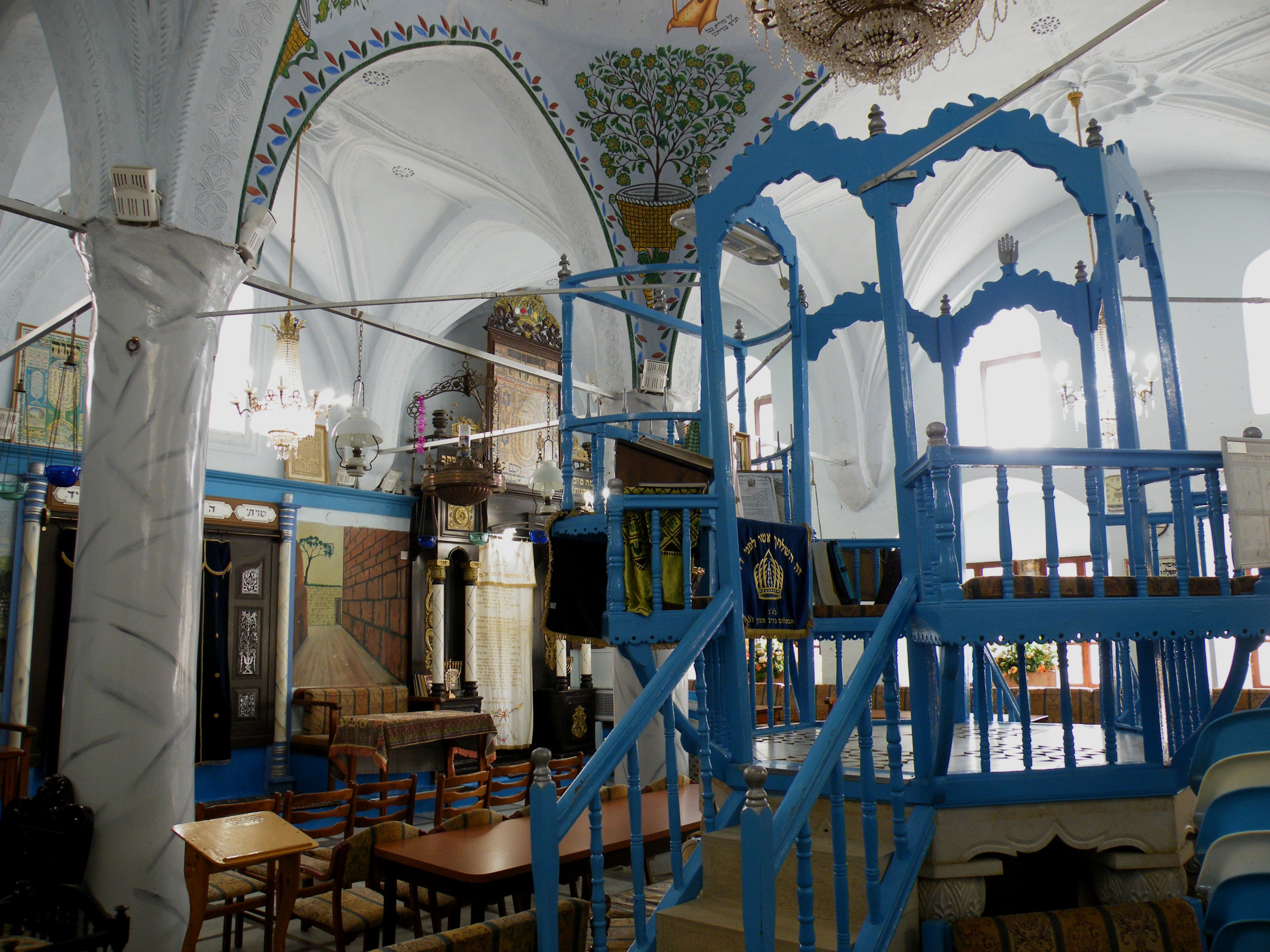

- Location of the synagogue in the northeast of the Northern District

Religion
- Affiliation: Judaism
- Rite: Kabbalah; Nusach Sefard
- Status: Active

Location
- Location: Abuhav Lane, Safed, Northern District
- Country: Israel
- Interactive map of Abuhav Synagogue
- Coordinates: 32°58′8.62″N 35°29′29.02″E

Architecture
- Type: Synagogue architecture
- Founder: Rabbi Isaac Abuhav
- Completed: 15th century

The Abuhav Synagogue (Hebrew: בית הכנסת אבוהב) is a Jewish congregation and synagogue, located in Safed, in the Northern Director of Israel. The synagogue was completed in the 15th century and named in honor of the Spanish kabbalist of the era, Rabbi Isaac Abuhav, and is located on the eponymous Abuhav Lane. Its design is said to be based upon Kabbalah teachings.

== History ==
According to tradition, Rabbi Yitzhak Abuhav, a Sephardic rabbi, designed the synagogue in Europe, and his disciples erected the building in Safed when they arrived in the 1490s after the expulsion from Spain. Another legend claims that the synagogue was transported miraculously from Spain to Safed. There is some abiguity over the identity of Abuhav, as there were two potential candidates the legend could be referring to. The rabbi of Toledo, Spain possessed a Torah scroll that is now housed in its Torah ark.

The synagogue was almost completely destroyed in the 1837 earthquake, only the southern wall containing the arks remained standing and exists today as a remnant of the original building. Local tradition believed that the arks were spared from the damage due to their holiness.

== Design ==
The bimah has six steps representing the six working days of the week; the top level is seventh, representing the Shabbat. The Torah ark has three sections and contain Torah scrolls traditionally written by Abuhav himself and Rabbi Suleiman Ohana of Fes, Morocco.

The synagogue is held up by four load-bearing pillars. The number was chosen to signify the four worldly elements in Kabbalah: fire, wind, water, and dust. Similarly, the ceiling is painted with several Kabbalistic motifs. The dome contains 10 windows to symbolize the Ten Commandments.

== Gallery ==
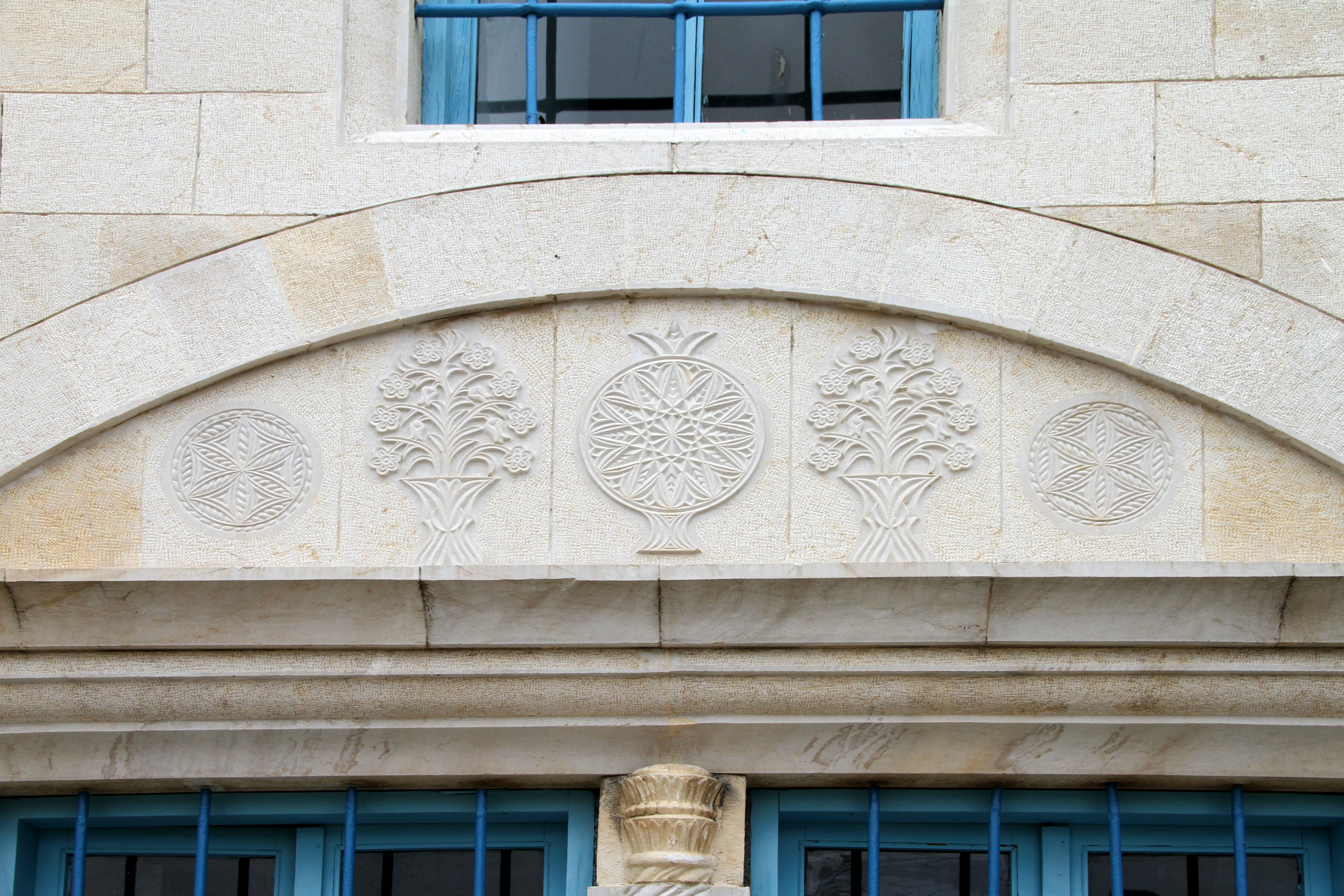
Central engravings of plants resembling the tree of life and pomegranates atop the entrance to the synagogue

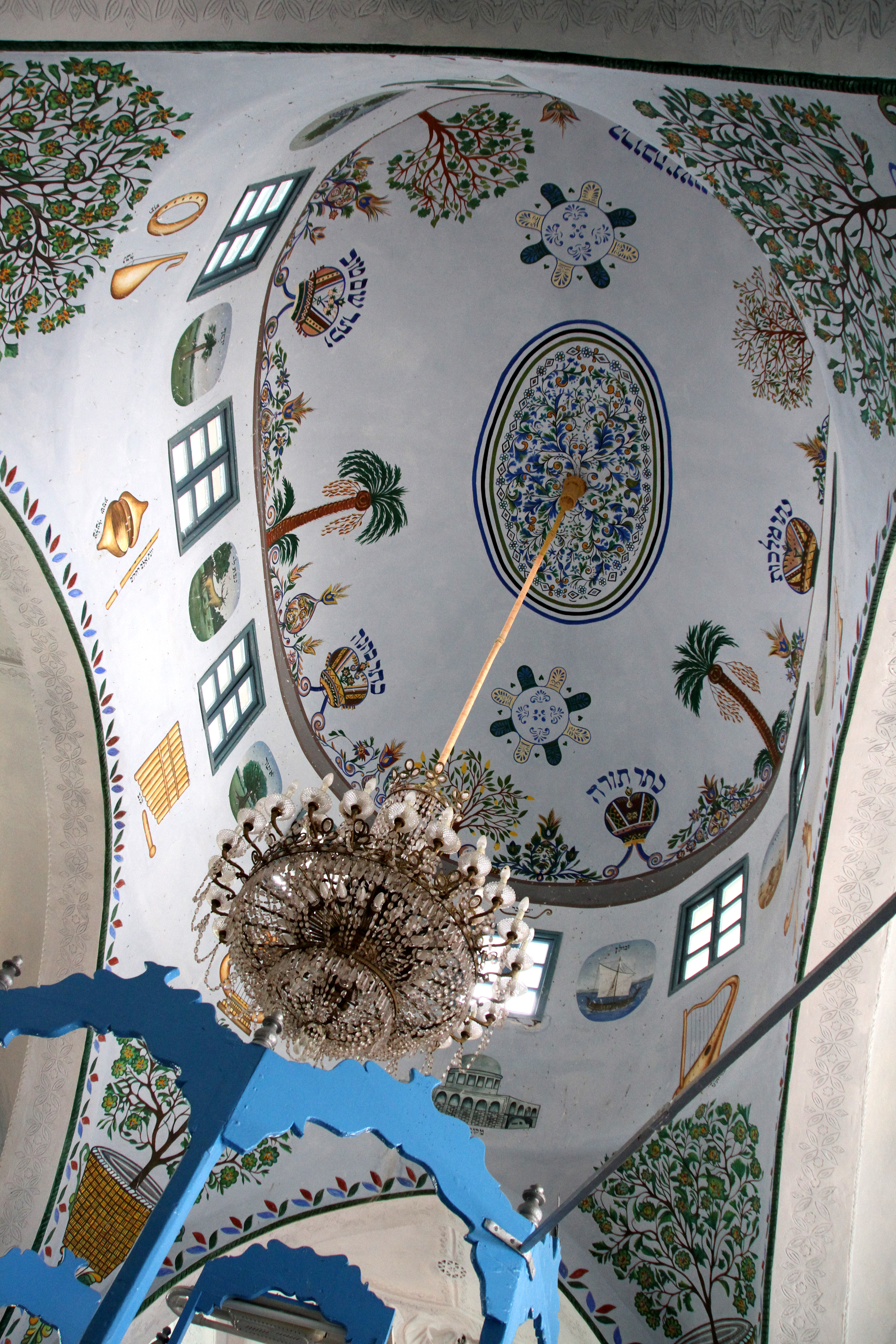
Chandelier in the central apse of the synagogue

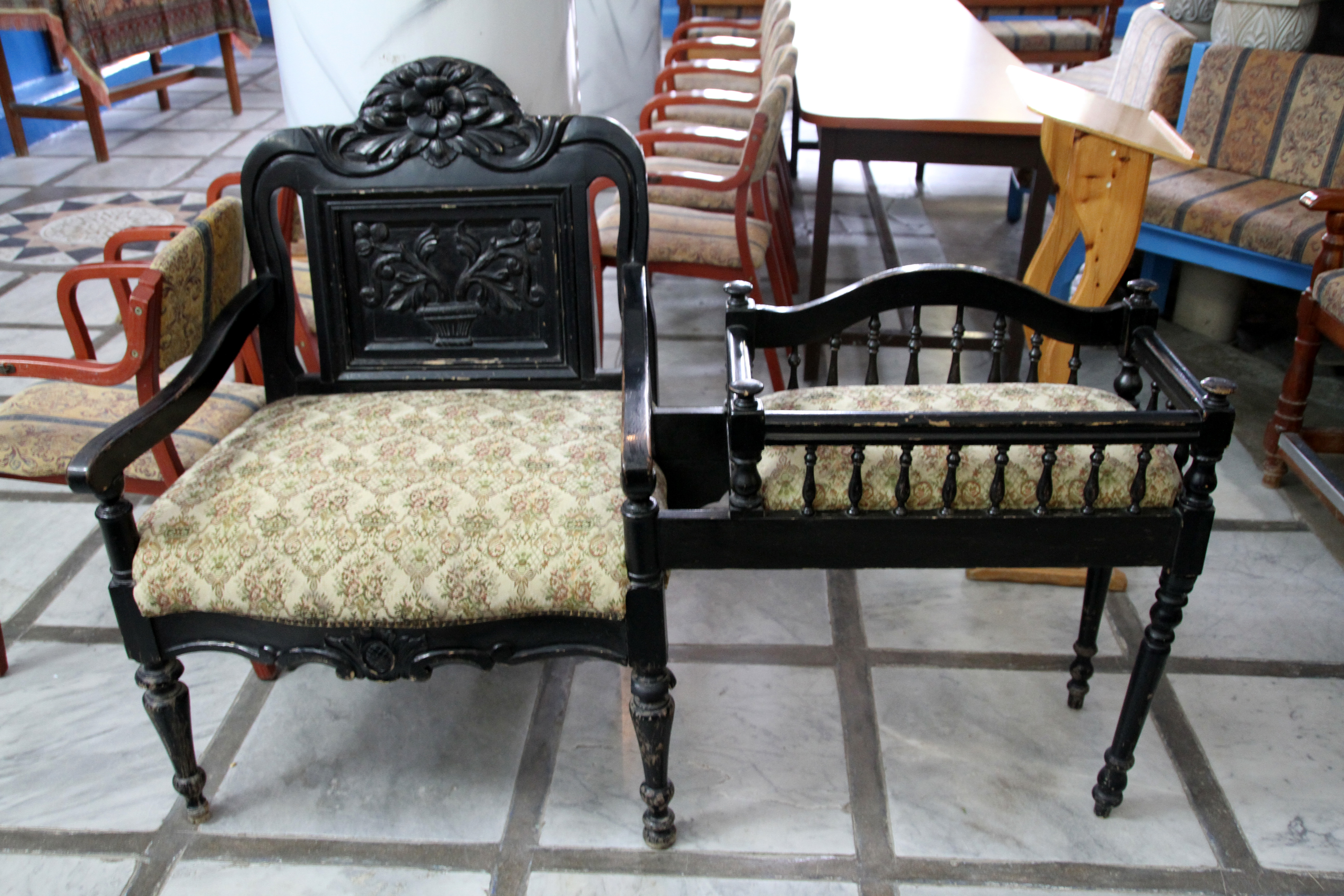
Traditional circumcision bench in the synagogue; the crib is where the baby boy is placed, and the sandek would sit in the chair

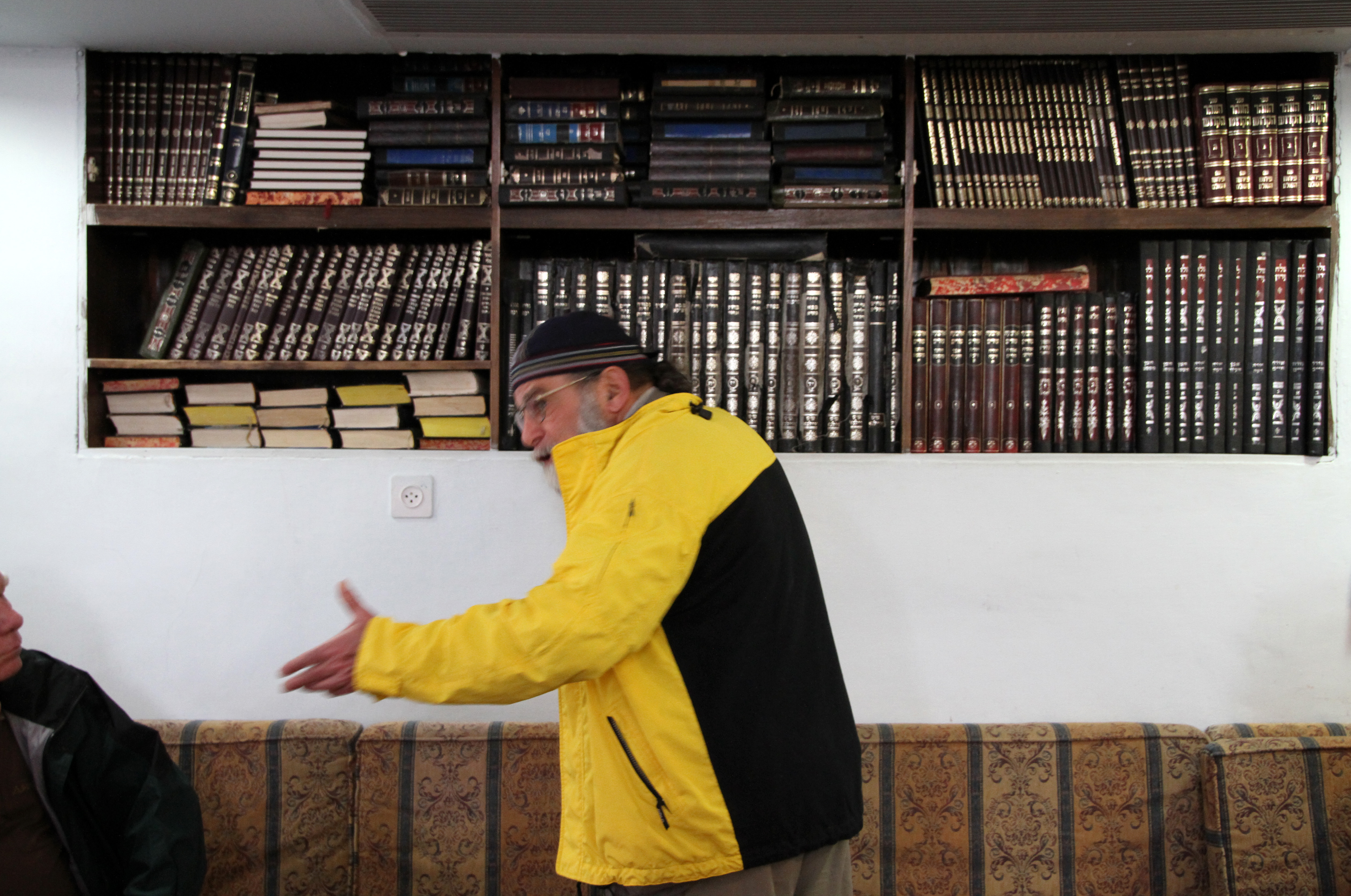
Seforim (Hebrew prayer and study books) lining the shelves of the building

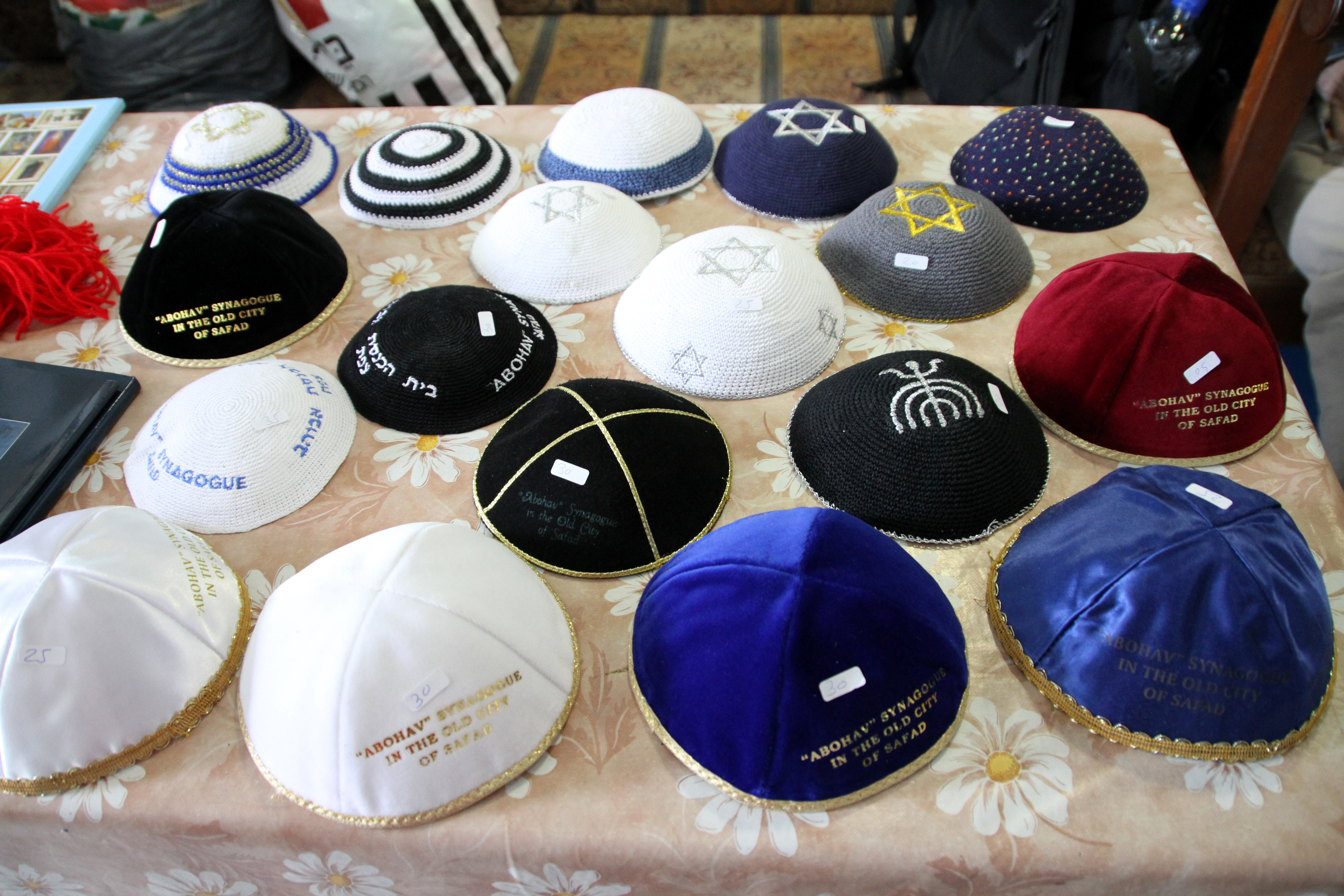
Assorted yarmulkes on a table in the synagogue for male entrants to wear

== See also ==
- History of the Jews in Israel
- List of synagogues in Israel
