= Hakam =

One of the names of God in Islam

Hakam (Ḥakam حكم), one of the names of God in Islam, meaning "The Judge", "The Giver of Justice", or "The Arbitrator". Also used as a personal name, Al-Hakam.

== As a Name of Allah ==
In Islamic belief "Al-Hakam" is the One who always delivers justice, in every situation, to everyone. Nothing happens in creation except by His authority and decree. Al-Hakam never wrongs anyone and is never oppressive. He is the only true Judge; no one can overturn His judgment or change his decree.

Hakam comes from the root Haa - kaaf- meem ح ک م which refers to the attribute of judging, being wise, passing a verdict, and preventing or restraining people from wrongdoing.
