= Isaac Aboab of Castile =

Jewish Rabbi (1433–1493)

Isaac Aboab of Castile (1433 – January 1493), also known as Isaac Aboab II, was a Spanish-Jewish Rabbi, Posek and Torah commentator.

== Biography ==
The Crown of Castile following the 1230 unification of the Kingdoms of Castile and León.

Born at Toledo, the great-great-grandson of Isaac Aboab I. He was the pupil and successor of Isaac Campanton, and was called "the last gaon of Castile." Later, he lived in Buitrago and Guadalajara and served as head of yeshiva in these cities. After Ferdinand and Isabella issued the decree of expulsion in 1492, he with thirty others of the most respected Jews of the land went to Lisbon in order to negotiate with King John II of Portugal for the reception of his banished coreligionists. He and his companions were allowed to settle under favorable conditions in Porto. He died a few months after the expulsion. His disciple, the chronicler and mathematician Abraham Zacuto, delivered his funeral address. Many of Aboab's disciples attained to great distinction. Of his works, the following have appeared in print:

- Nehar Pishon, a collection of sermons, Constantinople, 1538
- A supercommentary to Naḥmanides' Pentateuch-Commentary, Constantinople, 1525; Venice, 1548, etc.
- A supercommentary to the commentary of Rashi on the Pentateuch and a number of rabbinical decisions exist in manuscript.
- A commentary on the Tur cited frequently by the Bait Yosef and recently published in some editions of the Tur.
