= Peter Beer (historian) =

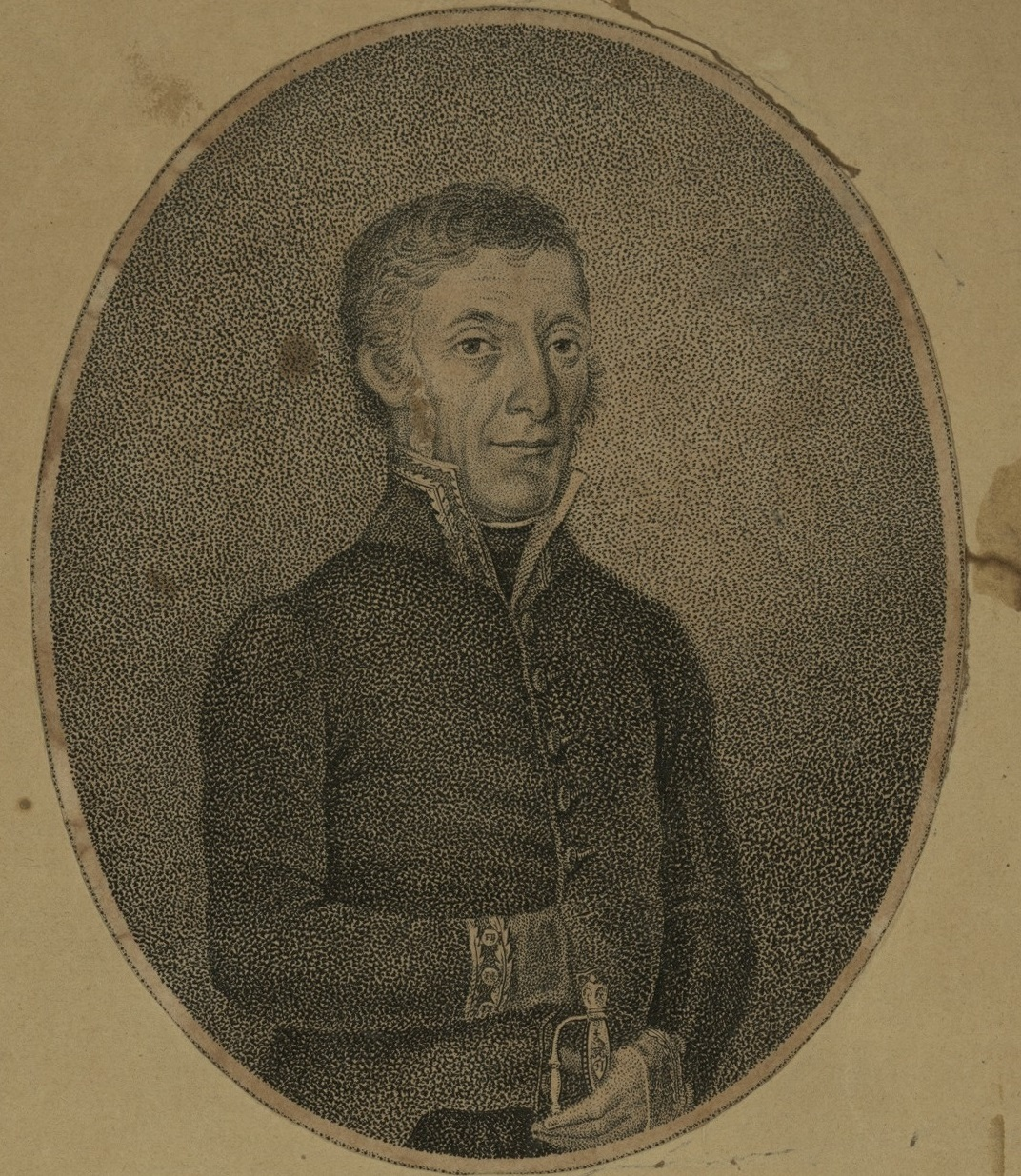
- Born: 19 February 1758; Nový Bydžov
- Died: 8 November 1838; Prague
- Occupations: Pedagogue, historian, author, geographer

Peter (Perez) Beer (1758–1838) was an Austrian Jewish enlightenment thinker, teacher and historian. He also used the pen name Theophil Nikodem.

== Life ==
He was born in from Nový Bydžov, Bohemia. He started as a teacher in 1783 at the Normalschule in Mattersburg, before returning to Nový Bydžov in 1785. He married Rebeka Hlawatsch in 1787 and they had seven children. He taught in Prague from 1811 until his death. He was probably one of the first Jews appointed to a government position when he was appointed "teacher of morals" to Jewish students at Prague high schools in 1813.

== Work ==
He is the author of Toldot Yisrael, published in Prague in 1796, which covers the biblical narrative for a young student audience from creation to the return from the Babylonian Exile, and its continuation and evolution in Geschichte der Juden, published in Vienna in 1808, which covers Jewish history from the Second Temple Period and is based on Josephus. It is an example of post-biblical Jewish historiography. He also wrote a critical work on rabbinical teaching methods called Kos jesuot oder Kelch des Heils in 1802 which was not a success and created a controversy among the authorities, and the later 1809/1810 Dal Yisroel, oder das Judentum which was designed to be palatable to the more orthodox. His 1822–1823 work was a history of Jewish sectarianism, comparing the Sadducees, Karaites, and Essenes to Rabbinic Judaism. His autobiography was published in 1839 posthumously. His works were used as textbooks in haskalah schools. He became active in religious reform and improving the lives of Jewish women.

Beer is a rationalist who critiques the kabbalah, which he regards as "fairy tales" influenced by ancient Egyptian mysteries, Chaldean magic, Zoroastrianism, and neo-Platonic philosophy. He refers to it as a "fabric web of conclusions, though designed with an enormous effort of wit and acumen, but still not based on secure grounds; a not even remotely comprehensible chaos, within which everybody can assemble the atoms at will – a building erected to immeasurable height but made of bubbles." His history stretches to the Jacob Emden and Jonathan Eybeschutz controversy and a history of Frankism.
