= Modern Jewish historiography =

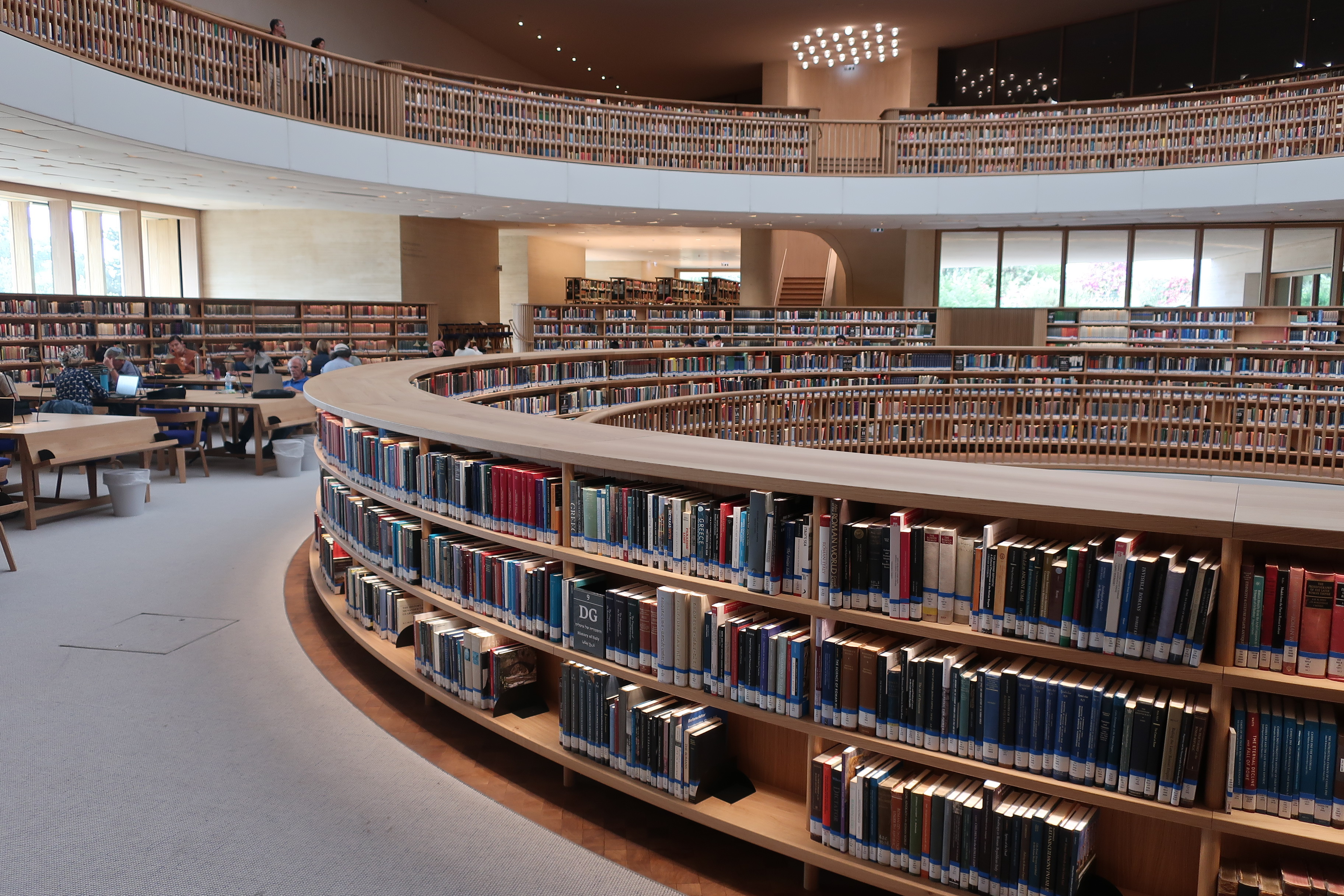
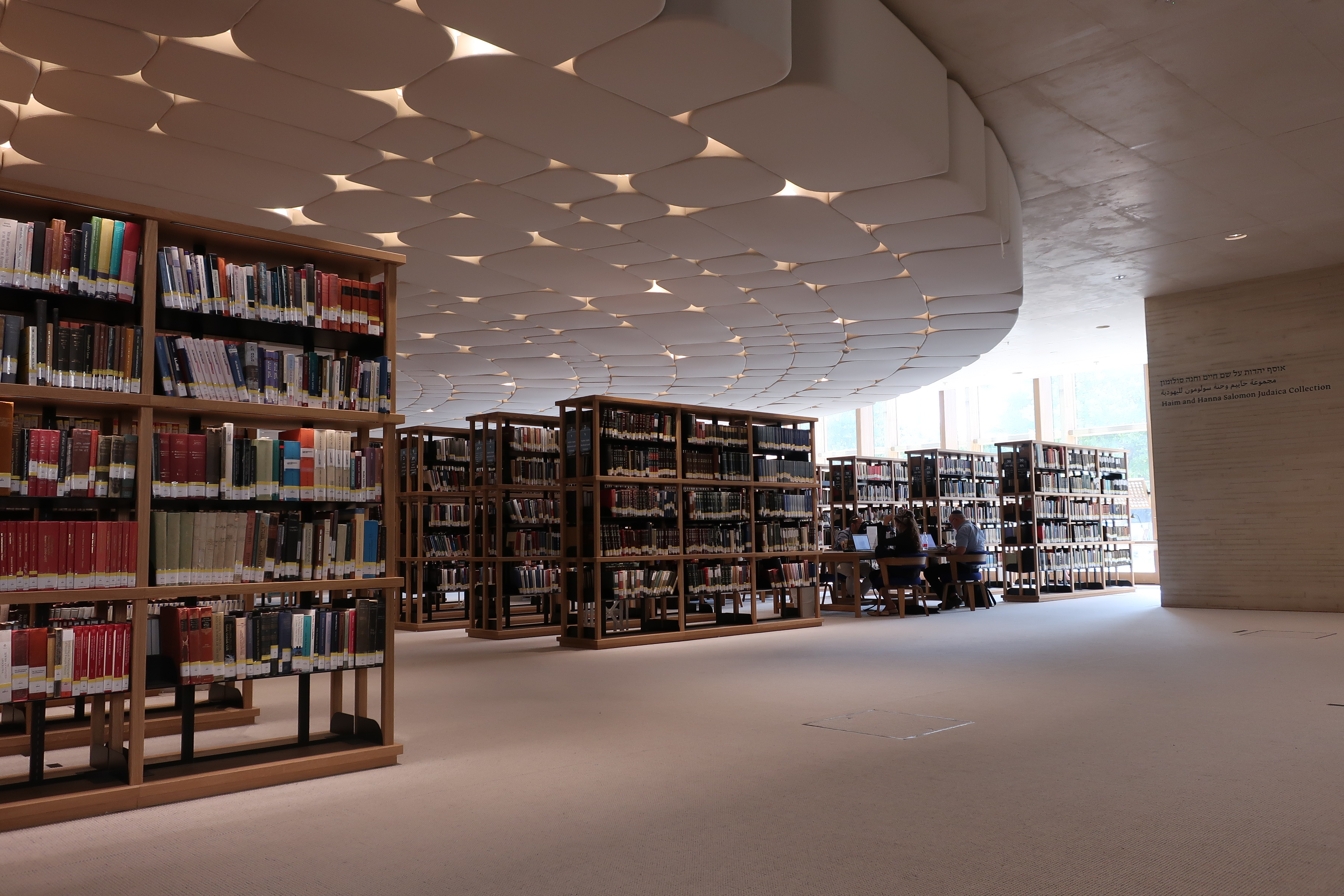
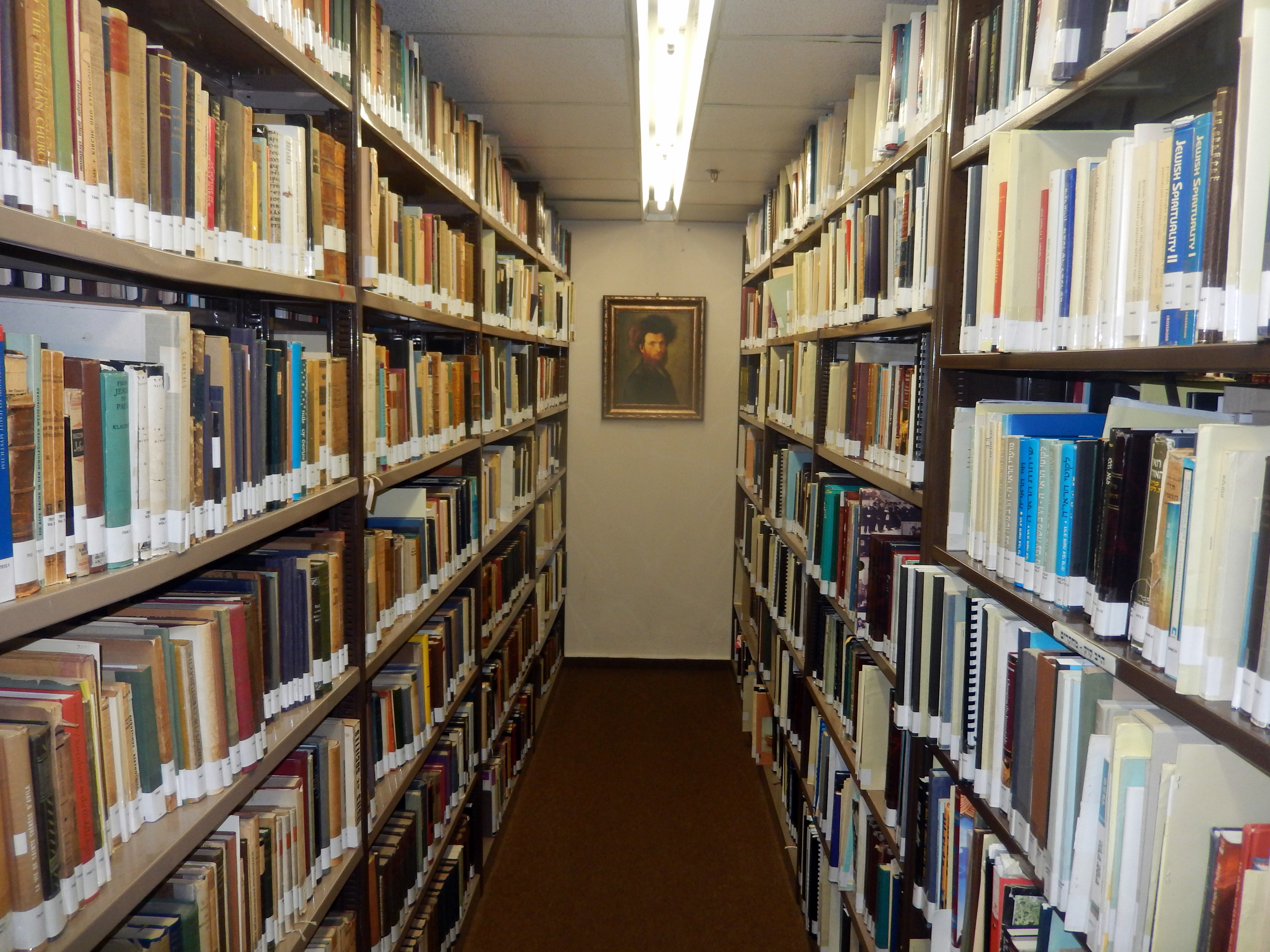
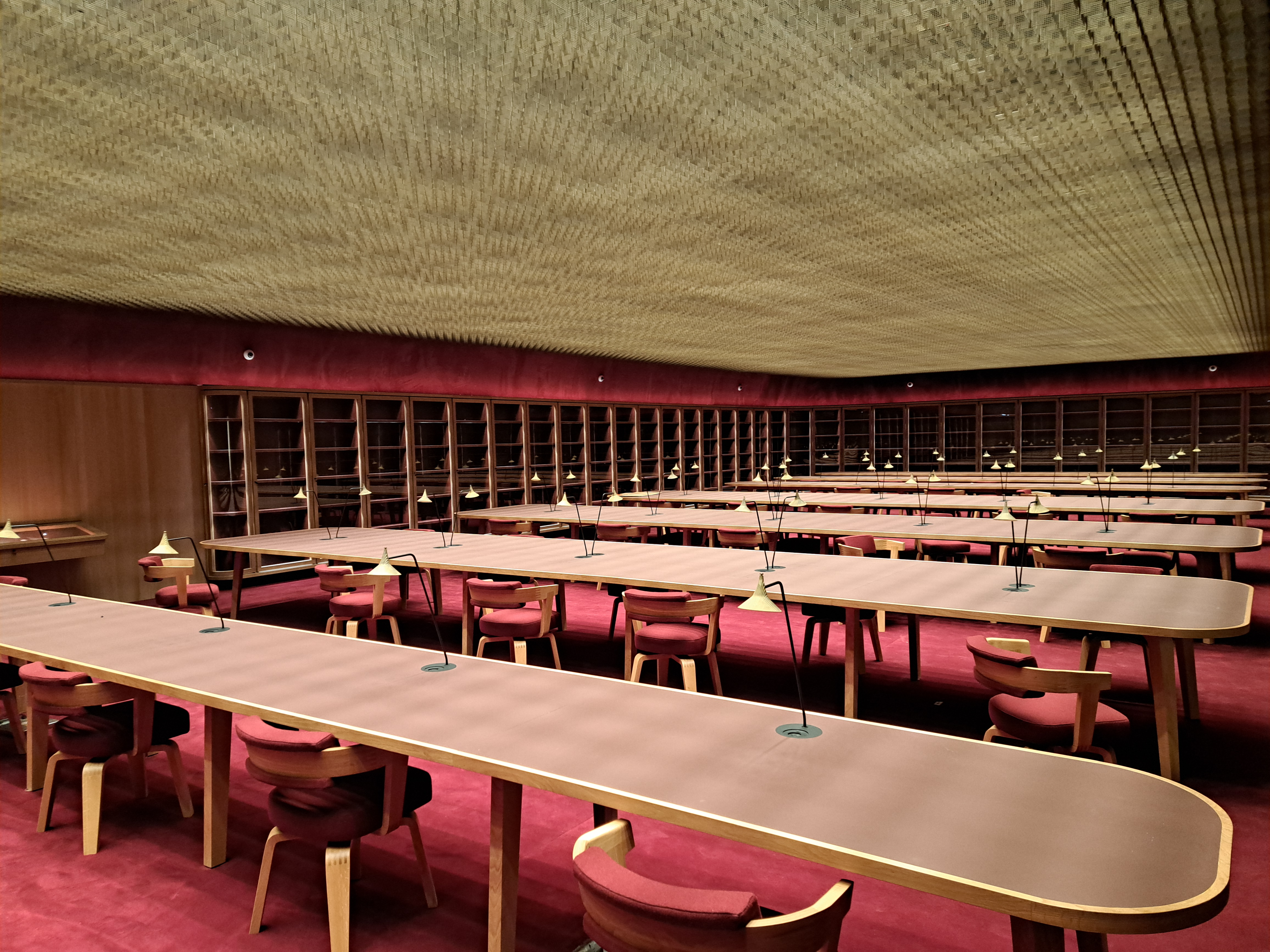
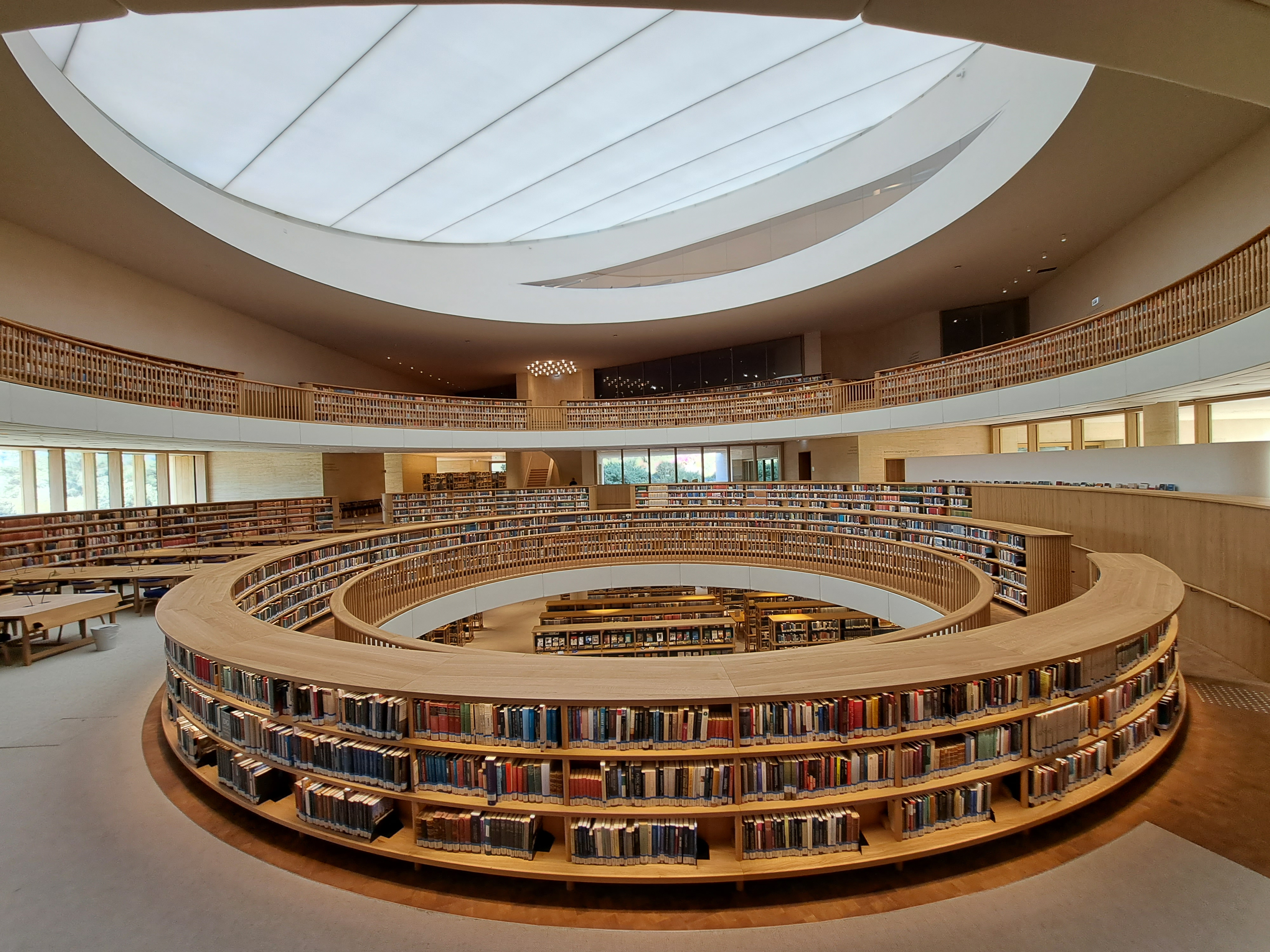
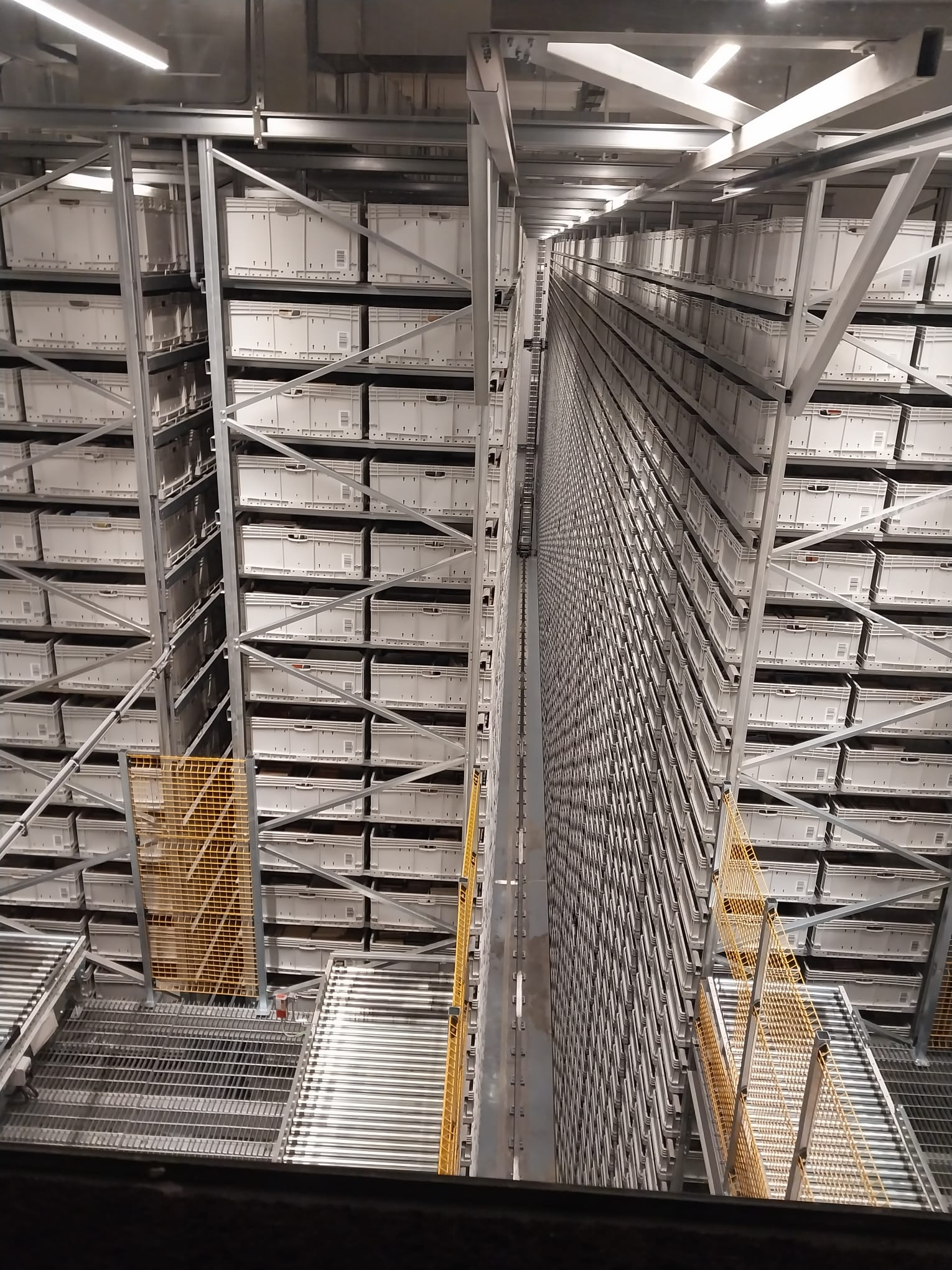
National Library of Israel, Jerusalem

Modern Jewish historiography is the modern iteration of Jewish historical narrative writing and historical literature. While Jewish oral history and the collection of commentaries in the Midrash and Talmud are ancient, and handwritten manuscripts survive, the rise of the printing press and movable type led to the publication of Jewish histories and early editions of the Torah/Tanakh that dealt with the history of Jewish diaspora ethno-religious groups, and increasingly, national histories of the Jews, Jewish nationhood or peoplehood and identity. This was a move from a manuscript or scribal culture to a printing culture. Jewish historians wrote accounts of their collective experiences and drew upon a corpus of culturally inherited text.

Jewish writers in antiquity and the Middle Ages recorded chronicles and martyrologies. Early modern Jewish historiography intertwines with intellectual movements such as the European Renaissance and the Age of Enlightenment. It drew upon earlier works from the Late Middle Ages and antiquity, such as Christian and Hellenistic materials. Modern Jewish historiography as distinct from earlier medieval historiography and ancient biblical historiography developed deeper formalized characteristics, such as the study of sources and methods. This movement weaves its way through the haskalah or the Jewish enlightenment. In the 19th century, this became the modern academic discipline of Jewish studies. The Wissenschaft des Judentums drew upon the 14th-16th century and earlier material and analyzed it while extending their study through modern developments. Therefore modern Jewish historiography often refers to the modern academic study of Jewish history.

== Background and context ==
Historian Salo Baron argued that medieval Jews preferred storytelling to history, while Yosef Hayim Yerushalmi argued that past was remembered in ritual. However, the abundance of medieval works shows that medieval Jews both produced and consumed historical work.

Mircea Eliade defined Judaism as a "historical religion;" Yerushalmi disagreed, but believed Jews practiced oriented or sacred history, such as biblical history, and were the "fathers of meaning in history." However, premodern Judaism before the Renaissance often didn't focus on post-biblical history, preferring philosophy and mysticism. Moshe Idel posits a model of Jewish history distinct from the typical role of history in European nationalism, conceived as a unification with, and then a rupture from, Jewish religious tradition.

Though not many of their works fully survive, Hellenistic Jewish historians such as Artapanus of Alexandria and Eupolemus presented an interpretatio Judaica which argued for the antiquity of their people, drawing on inherited texts. While Hellenistic Jewish historiography was forgotten by mainstream Jewish thought for many years, it was preserved by the Church and in the Book of Maccabees from Hasmonean Judea. The historical works of Philo of Alexandria and Justus of Tiberias are only partially preserved. Another example is Demetrius the Chronographer.

The earliest Hebrew books were printed in Rome starting in 1469. Early printers were aware of the strong sofer tradition of Hebrew scribal production. The move to printing eliminated the diversity in manuscripts and enabled texts to reach more people.

The major publications in Jewish history in the early modern period were influenced by the political climate of their respective times. Certain Jewish historians, acting on a desire to achieve Jewish equality, used Jewish history as a tool towards Jewish emancipation and religious reform. Regarding the Jewish historians of the 18th and 19th centuries, Michael A. Meyer writes that: "Envisaging Jewish identity as essentially religious, they created a Jewish past that focused on Jewish religious rationality, and stressed Jewish integration within the societies in which Jews lived."

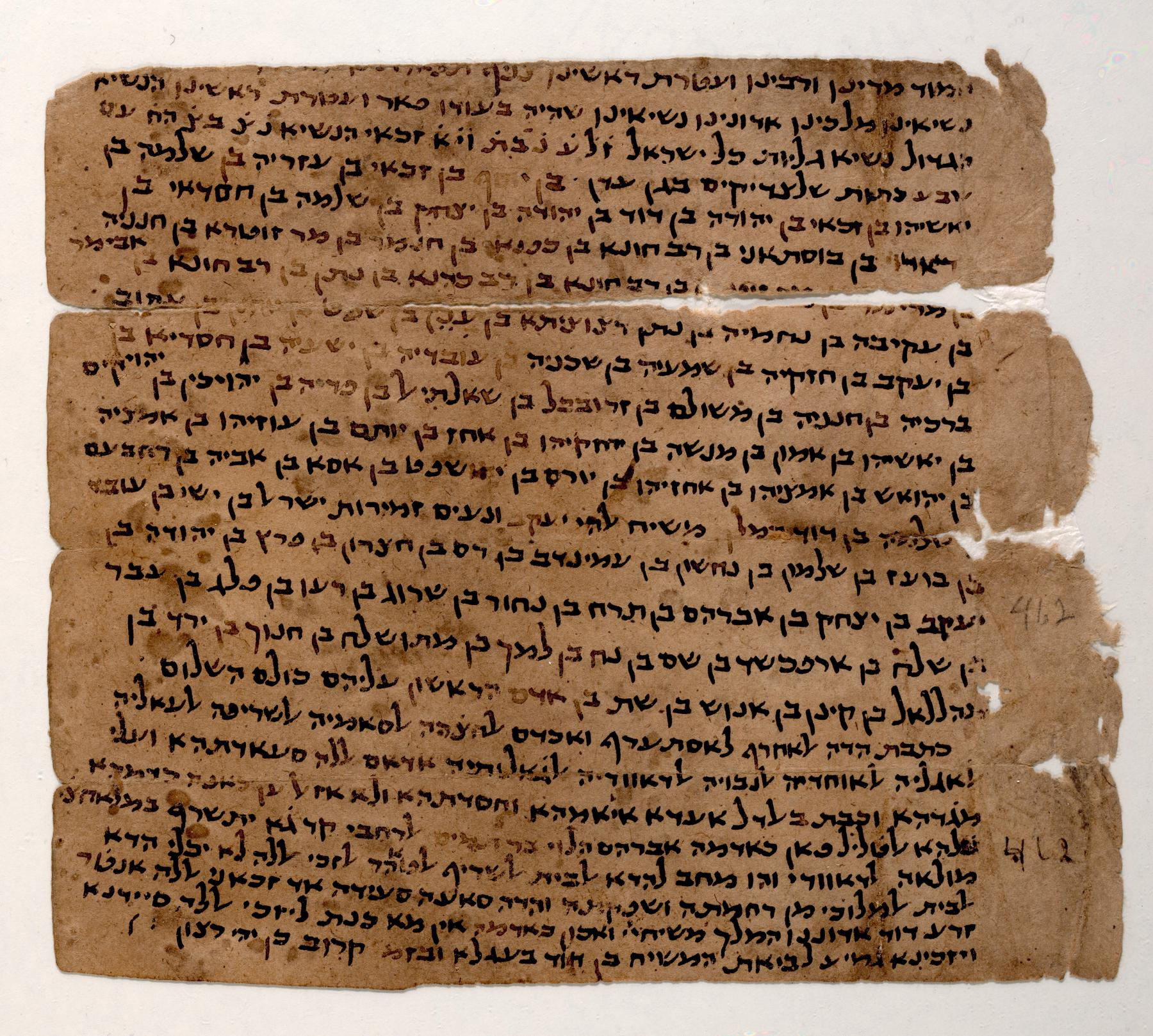
Genealogy of the Exilarchs to David and Adam, Avraham ben Tamim, Cairo Geniza, 1100s (Katz Center/UPenn)

=== Attitudes toward historical writing ===
Talmudic authorities discouraged the writing of history in the medieval and early modern era; the extent to which this was effective in discouraging actual historical production is unclear. Moritz Steinschneider and Arnaldo Momigliano had observed that Jewish historiography appears to slow down at the end of the Second Temple period, and even Maimonides (1138–1204) considered history a waste of time. Maimonides does however relate Jewish historical content in his Epistle to Yemen. Isaac Abarbanel, while he practiced and defended traditional biblical historiography, criticized contemporary historiographers for bias and unreliability, mixing truth with falsehood due to their preferences, and emphasized the importance of eyewitness accounts.

Officially, secular philosophy was seen by some medieval rabbinic authorities as a gentile activity and forbidden. Higher-class Jewish scholars were encouraged to study medicine. Astrology was also permitted. Medicine, astronomy and cosmography were an acceptable blending of religion and science, drawing on the Babylonians. History was read at times but considered an activity pursued by other groups; however, medieval Jewish authorities in the Arab world treated the practice of secular philosophy with salutary neglect, though banned, a blind eye was turned to its practice. In fact, as David Berger notes, Spanish Jewry was clearly hospitable to philosophy, literary arts and the sciences.

Joseph Caro called history books "books of wars," which he prohibited the reading of as the "sitting in the gathering of thoughtless people," and the Geonim, such as Saadia Gaon, implied the roots of heresy or simply lack of education. Some medieval attempts at critical historiography were met with controversy or imposed sanctions or prohibitions, such as bans, selective or general, or ordered burnings, or boycotts and effective sabotage of the publication's success. The conventional wisdom in Jewish historiography, as epitomized by Baron and Yerushalmi, is that halakhic attitudes severely limited the output of medieval Jewish historians, though this has been refuted by Robert Bonfil, Amos Funkenstein, and Berger, the former considering the Renaissance to be the "swan song" of earlier work, forming an important Yerushalmi-Bonfil debate in Jewish historiography according to Yerushalmi's student David N. Myers.

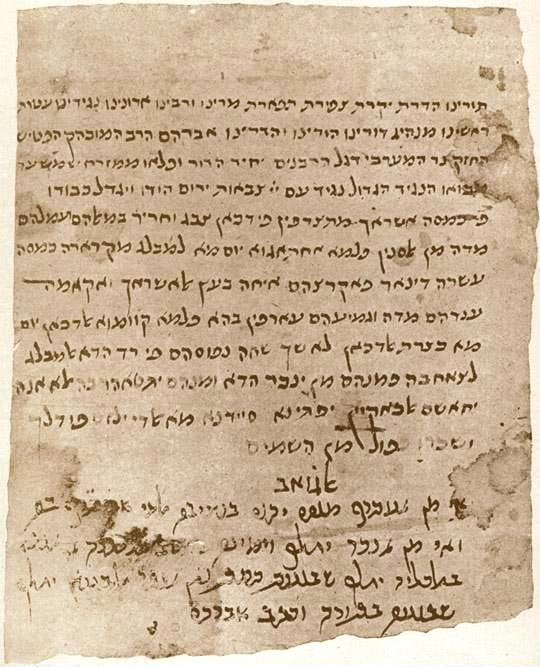
letter from Abraham Maimonides (1186-1237), in the Cairo Geniza, reprinted 1906 Brockhaus & Efron Jewish Encyclopedia

Amram Tropper has explained that intellectual elites used classicist literature and scholasticism to construct identity in the Roman Empire after failed Jewish revolts. Explaining through the example of Maimonides, ha-Cohen's, and Elijah Capsali (1485-1550)'s attitude toward history, Bonfil shows there is nonetheless a medieval historiography inherited by later writers, though he acknowledges the paucity of Jewish medieval historiography and the impact of the negative halakhic stance that should not be underestimated. Capsali, an important historian of Muslim and Ottoman history, has a medieval historical approach, with early modern subject matter. Capsali's chronicle may be the first example of a diasporic Jew writing a history of their own location (Venice).

Bonfil surmises that the return to traditionalism in orthodoxy was actually a later phenomenon, a reactionary response to modernity. When those among the halakhic authorities who valued philosophy studied it, such as Moses Isserles, they justified it with a continuity to Hellenistic philosophy.

Notably, Baruch Spinoza was excommunicated for transgressing the bounds of Rabbinic thought into the growing domain of Enlightenment philosophy in 1656. Spinoza and rabbi Joseph Solomon Delmedigo, who studied with Galileo, shared a goal to liberate science from theology, and combined it with scriptural references. Spinoza and others, such as Abraham Abulafia or Ibn Caspi, became figures in the conflict between emancipation and traditionalism in Jewish political and historical ideology. Israël Salvator Révah, per Marina Rustow, has stressed that the anti-rabbinic themes expressed by both Uriel da Costa (1585-1640) and Spinoza had emerged from the crucible of Iberian crypto-Jewish culture. Early modern philology (i.e. the study of historical texts) had an important impact on the development of the Enlightenment intellectual movements through work such as that of Spinoza. Richard Simon also had his work of historical biblical criticism suppressed by the Catholic authorities in France in 1678. While some Jews were willing to express doubt or disbelief privately, they feared the judgment or ostracism of the community to go too far in criticism of the establishment.

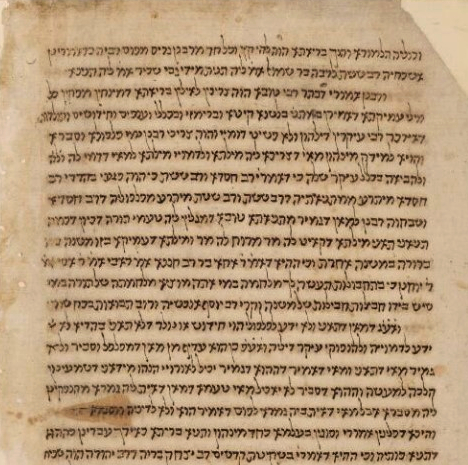
Responsa of the Geonim, 1300s, Österreichische Nationalbibliothek, Vienna

Medieval Jewish historical consciousness permeated various writings beyond formal historiography. Steinschneider included a broad range of texts in his definition of historical literature, such as selichot (penitential prayers), qinot (elegies), communal statutes, travel accounts, minhagim (customs), testaments, and letters. Yerushalmi acknowledged "the so-called 'chain of tradition' of the oral law (shalshelet ha-qabbalah)" was the exception to the scarcity of medieval Jewish historiography, that Bonfil pointed out remained a bestseller even in the era of early printed books, leading Bonfil to view Renaissance and Baroque Jewish historical writing as a "sad epilogue" of the medieval period. Bonfil further argued that this scarcity was partly due to a perceived Jewish marginality and lack of agency in political and military spheres, which were the predominant subjects of medieval historiography. Bonfil has pointed out that the chain of tradition has parallels in the Christian historiographical genre of apostolic succession as established by Eusebius in his medieval ecclesiastic historiography such as the Ecclesiastical History and other historiography in the Middle Ages, and Tropper has pointed out that both inherit from Hellenistic succession tradition such as those from the second Sophistic movement (60-250). Eusebius was influenced by Josephus. Bart Wallet points out that shalshelet ha-qabbalah influenced later historians such as David Gans and Menahem Amelander.

=== Medieval sources ===
About 90% of world Jewry inhabited the Muslim world around the Mediterranean in the medieval period. Jews of the medieval Islamic world such as Andalusia, North Africa, Syria, Palestine, and Iraq were prolific producers and consumers of historical works in Hebrew, Judeo-Arabic, Arabic and rarely Aramaic. David B. Ruderman has stated that Bonfil's perspective on the complex dialectic between Jews and non-Jews, rather than a simplistic understanding of "influence," is a revisionist perspective with implications for understanding historiography in context be it Christian or Ottoman; Ruderman is a proponent of Bonfil's interpretation.

Over 400,000 manuscript fragments in the Cairo Geniza are an important historical source from the Fatimid period, rediscovered as a historical source in the 18th and 19th centuries. The Geniza has been called a "lost archive." The Geniza was literally a storeroom in the Ben Ezra Synagogue in Fustat which contained scrap documents dating to the 9th century, and now exists as a corpus of widely-studied documents at various academic institutions.

Iggeret of Rabbi Sherira Gaon (987) and Sefer ha-Qabbalah (1161) by Abraham ibn Daud (ibn David) were two medieval sources available to and trusted by Jewish thinkers and early modern historiographers and are two of the most widely-cited and important early sources. Ibn David is considered one of the first rationalist Spanish Jewish philosophers. The 10th century responsa of the Geonim are an important corpus of correspondence. Iraqi Jews in areas such as Baghdad and Basra, were an important community in this time period and corresponded with the Talmudic academies in Babylonia.

The medieval chroniclers included Ahimaaz ben Paltiel in 1054 in Byzantine Italy, who merged history with mythology and hagiography in liturgical poems, and the Ashkenazic martyrologers such as Solomon bar Simson around 1140 in Mainz who recorded the persecutions of the Crusades, Eliezer bar Nathan (1090–c.1170), before 1146 in Mainz, Ephraim bar Jacob of Bonn (1132–1200 or 1221), the Sefer ha-Zikhronot, or Sefer ha-Zikaron (Book of Memory) of Eleazar bar Asher ha-Levi around 1335, and the Mainz Anonymous were important medieval sources. Bonfil calls this genre a book-of-tales or a sefer-midrash. Eli Yassif wrote that Sefer ha-Zikhronot constitutes the "greatest, most encompassing, and diverse literary anthology of the Jewish Middle Ages that we know of," and it strove to create "an encompassing historical picture of the world and the Jewish people" and a "universal history."

Menachem HaMeiri of Perpignan (c.1249–c.1315), writing in Southern France, makes reference to many historical events in his commentary, and makes use of ibn Daud and Sherira Gaon. These medieval chronicles are part of the chain of tradition genre, as does David ben Samuel of Estelle (c.1340) in an overview of rabbinic scholarship. Isaaq ben Yaqob de Lattes, who incorporates both of the former in his 1372 chronicle Shaarey Tzion (Gates of Zion) which was relied upon by Saadiah ben Maimun ibn Danan (c.1436–93), Gedaliah ibn Yahya, David Conforte, and Hayyim Azulai. The chronicle of Abraham bar Hiyya d. c.1136, considered the first chronicle of Jewish Christian Spain, was also utilized by ibn Daud and covers biblical, Jewish and world history until 1099. In Spain, Menahem ben Aaron ibn Zerah (1308 or 1310, to 1385), Samuel ibn Senah Tzartza (c.1369), and Hasdai Crescas (1340–1410/11) recorded the sufferings of Jewish communities of Spain. Profiat Duran (d. c.1414) wrote a survey of Jewish persecutions from the destruction of the Temple in 70 CE to the pogroms of 1391 during which he was forcibly baptized. Joseph ben Tzaddik incorporated a chain of tradition in his Qitzur Zekher Tzaddiq (Compendium of the Memory of the Righteous), 1467-1487. Abraham ben Solomon of Torrutiel continued ibn Daud in 1510 covering the events of 1492.

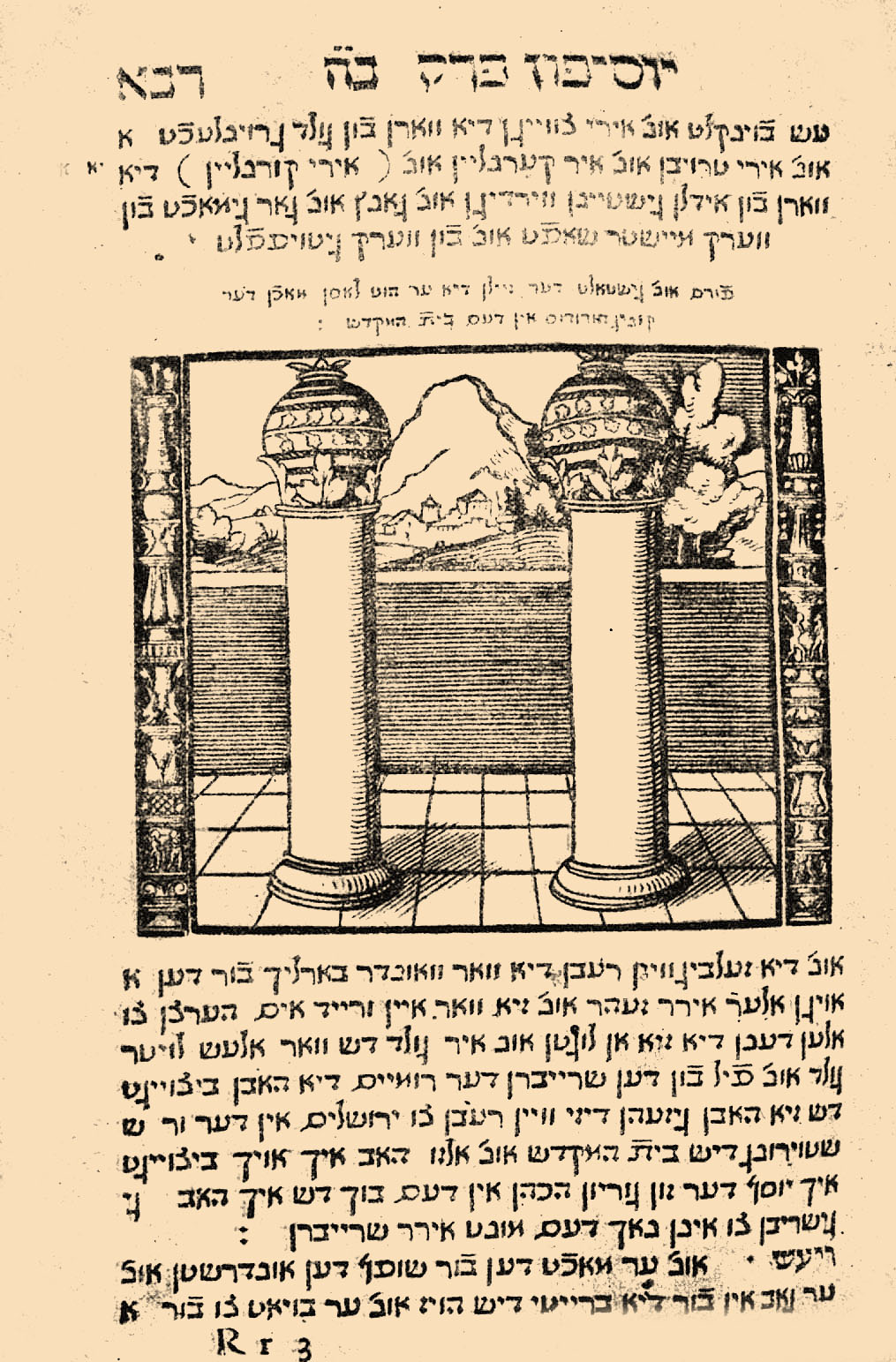
Yiddish Josippon 1546, reprinted 1906 Brockhaus & Efron Jewish Encyclopedia

==== Josippon ====
Josippon (or Sefer/Sepher Josippon), also called "Josephus of the Jews," was a key medieval source familiar to Hasdai ibn Shaprut and Ibn Hazm, one of if not the most influential historical works in pre-modern Jewish historiography, probably composed by a pseudonymous "Joseph ben Gorion" in the 10th century based on the earlier Josephus Flavius and his work Antiquities of the Jews. It relies on the Hegesippus (or Pseudo-Hegesippus), a Latin translator of Antiquities and Josephus' The Jewish War. The author had access to a decent library of material and drew on 1 Maccabees, 2 Maccabees, Jerome's translation of Eusebius, the Aeneid, Macrobius, Orosius, and Livy. Like its namesake and inspiration, the work commingles Roman history and Jewish history. Yosippon was republished in the 16th century and was a historical chronicle of critical importance to medieval Jews. It was relied on by Abraham ibn Ezra and Isaac Abravanel. These books were frequently reprinted through the 18th century.

The work emerged from the context of Hellenistic Judaism or Romaniote Judaism in the Jewish Byzantine Empire. The version of Josippon by the young Balkan scholar Yehudah ibn Moskoni (1328-1377), printed in Constantinople in 1510 and translated to English in 1558, became the most popular book published by Jews and about Jews for non-Jews, who ascribed its authenticity to the Roman Josephus, until the 20th century. Born in Byzantium, Moskoni's library of 198 volumes was once considered by historians to be the largest individual Jewish library in medieval Western Europe, although as Eleazar Gutwirth notes, there were numerous Jewish and converso libraries 1229-1550, citing Jocelyn Nigel Hillgarth. He further notes that Moskoni's library was sold in 1375 for a high price, and that Moskoni specifically commented on the use of non-Jewish sources in Josippon. Moskoni was part of a Byzantine Greek-Jewish milieu that produced a number of philosophical works in Hebrew and a common intellectual community of Jews in the Mediterranean.

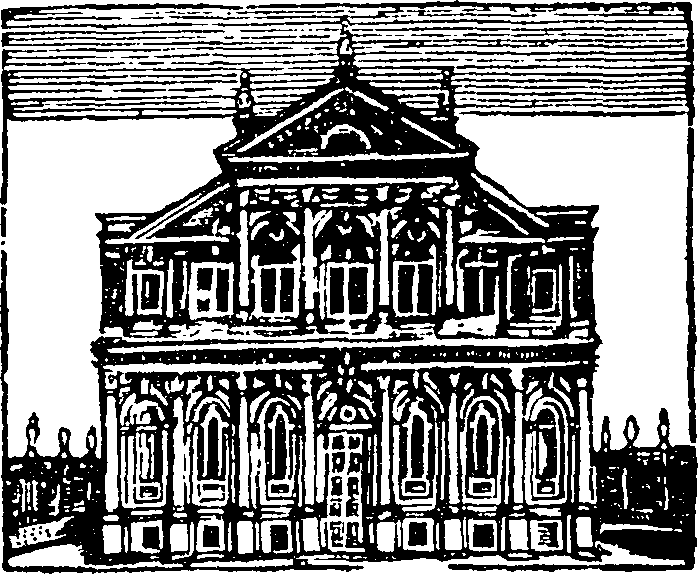
Printer's fleuron from 1706 edition of Josippon

Ibn Khaldun (1332-1406) 's Muqaddimah (1377) also contains a post-biblical Jewish history of the "Israelites in Syria" and he relied on Jewish sources, such as the Arabic translation of Josippon by Zachariah ibn Said, a Yemenite Jew, according to Khalifa (d. 1655). Saskia Dönitz has analyzed an earlier Egyptian version older than the version reconstructed by David Flusser, drawing on the work of a parallel Judaeo-Arabic Josippon by Shulamit Sela and fragments in the Cairo Geniza and the Genizat Germania, which indicate that Josippon is a composite text redacted several times.

Josippon was also a popular work or a volksbuch, and had further influence such as its Latin translation by Christian Hebraist Sebastian Münster which was translated into English by Peter Morvyn, a fellow of Magdalen College in Oxford and a Canon of Lichfield, printed by Richard Jugge, printer to the Queen in England, and according to Lucien Wolf may have played a role in the resettlement of the Jews in England. Munster also translated the historical work of ibn Daud which was included with Morwyng's edition. Steven Bowman notes that Josippon is an early work that inspired Jewish nationalism and had a significant influence on midrashic literature and talmudic chroniclers as well as secular historians, though considered aggadah by mainstream Jewish thought, and acted as an ur-text for 19th century efforts in Jewish national history.

=== Jewish expulsions and the Spanish Inquisition ===
map of Jewish expulsions

Jewish expulsions accelerated in the 15th century and influenced the growth in Jewish historiography. Sephardic Jews from Spain, Portugal, and France settled in Italy and the Ottoman Empire during this period, shifting the nexus of Jewry east. Southern France, particularly Narbonne, Hachmei Provence and the Languedoc region, had a large population of respected rabbis and Jewish authors, were forced to convert or flee in the 14th century, and they sought to avoid detection, which creates a paucity of documentation and a difficult scenario for historians. Within Italy, there was also considerable upheaval with the migration and expulsion of Jews in the Papal States in the late 1500s.

The Spanish Inquisition attempted to burn any parchment or paper containing Hebrew, and any book known to have been translated from Hebrew. This led to an estimated millions of texts destroyed in Spain and Portugal, especially centers of academic learning as Salamanca and Coimbra, rendering surviving manuscripts in foreign libraries rare and hard to come by.

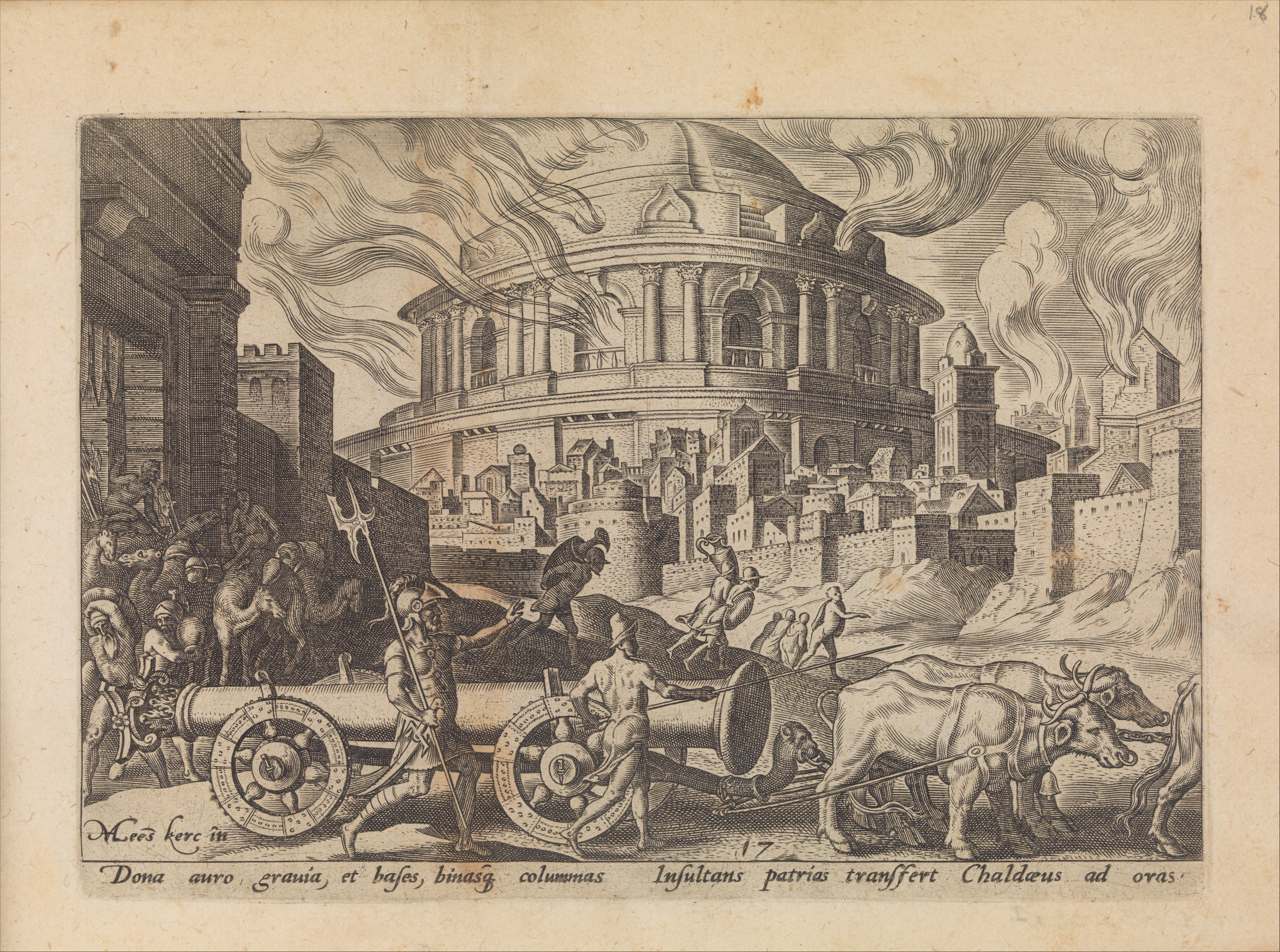
Maarten van Heemskerck (1498–1574), Philip Galle (1537–1612), The Chaldeans Carrying Away the Pillars of the Temple of Jerusalem, The Disasters of the Jewish People (1569)

Whether the Spanish Inquisition's records are truthful or worthy of trust is the subject of debate. Historians such as Yitzhak Baer and Haim Beinart have taken the view that the crypto-Jews were sincerely Jewish; Benzion Netanyahu has argued they were sincerely Christian converts, and their secret practice of Judaism a myth, before changing his view; Norman Roth has also argued the Inquisition's records can be trusted, which is disputed.

Yerushalmi observed that the "rise of Jewish historiography in the 16th century" in the works of Solomon ibn Verga (1460–1554), Abraham Zakuto (1452-c.1515), Samuel Usque (1500–after 1555), Joseph ha-Kohen (1496–1575), Gedaliah ibn Yaḥia (1526–87), Elijah Capsali (1483–1555), and David Gans (1541–1613) form "a cultural and historical continuum" in their relationship to "the primary stimulus" of expulsion from Spain and Portugal. The exceptions were Azariah de Rossi (1513–78), and per Mordechai Breuer, Gans.

== 16th century: post-medieval and Renaissance era ==
The 16th century is considered something of a blossoming of Jewish historiography by some historians, such as Yerushalmi, who characterizes the focus as shifting social and post-biblical. Although some historians focus on the 19th century as an important period in the development of modern Jewish historiography, the 16th century is also considered an important period which inspired it. Religion figured prominently and the differences in martyrdom and messianic figures in Sephardic and Ashkenazic communities post-expulsion are the subject of historiographical debate. Some historians, such as Bonfil, have disagreed with Yerushalmi that this period produced a significant sea change in historiography.

Italian Jewry in particular benefitted from factors such as education, geography, and access to printing. They enjoyed relative freedom during the period and had contact with Christian scholars. Besides their interest in Jewish text, they also pursued the sciences, medicine, music, and history. The liberal dukes of d'Este practiced toleration of Jewish faith.

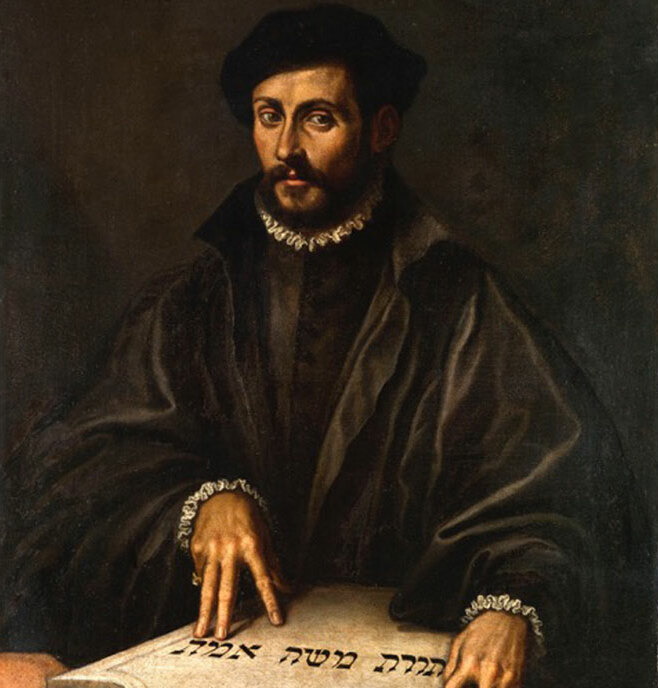
Portrait of a Man Pointing at a Hebrew Tablet, Antonio Campi, Cremona (1524-1587)

The Book of the Honeycomb's Flow (1476) by Italian rabbi Judah Messer Leon (c.1420-1498) (Judah ben Jehiel, alias Leone di Vitale) is an early work of humanistic classical rhetorical analysis that was also noted by Graetz, which was noted by Bonfil, and paraphrasing Israel Zinberg stated, he "was a child not only of the old people of Israel, but also of the youthful Renaissance." Nofet Zufim drew on the classical theoretical writings of Cicero, Averroes and Quintilian While not a work of history, it was a precursor to Azariah dei Rossi and cited by him as opening the door to the value of secular studies. It was printed by Abraham Conat. David ben Judah Messer Leon, his son, published a humanistic work defending the literary arts in Constantinople in 1497.

=== Zacuto ===
The 1504 historic work of the Portuguese royal astronomer Abraham Zacuto (1452-1515), Sefer ha-Yuḥasin (Book of the Genealogies), contains anti-Christian historiographical polemic and urging of strength in the face of persecution and Jewish martyrdom. Still, Zacuto was aware of and depended on secular work. Zacuto was an important scientist who befriended Columbus and provided a meaningful new astrolabe for the Portuguese explorers in addition to his work in history and commentary. Abraham A. Neuman writes,

Sefer Yuhasin is a medley of historical biographical notes, reminiscences, comments and observations which often express his inner thoughts. Here, he appears in his strength and weakness, a man of numerous contradictions. He was necessarily a many-sided figure, for he lived and participated in the adventures of an explosive age, midway between medievalism and modernism, holding in its grasp the Inquisition and the discovery of new worlds.

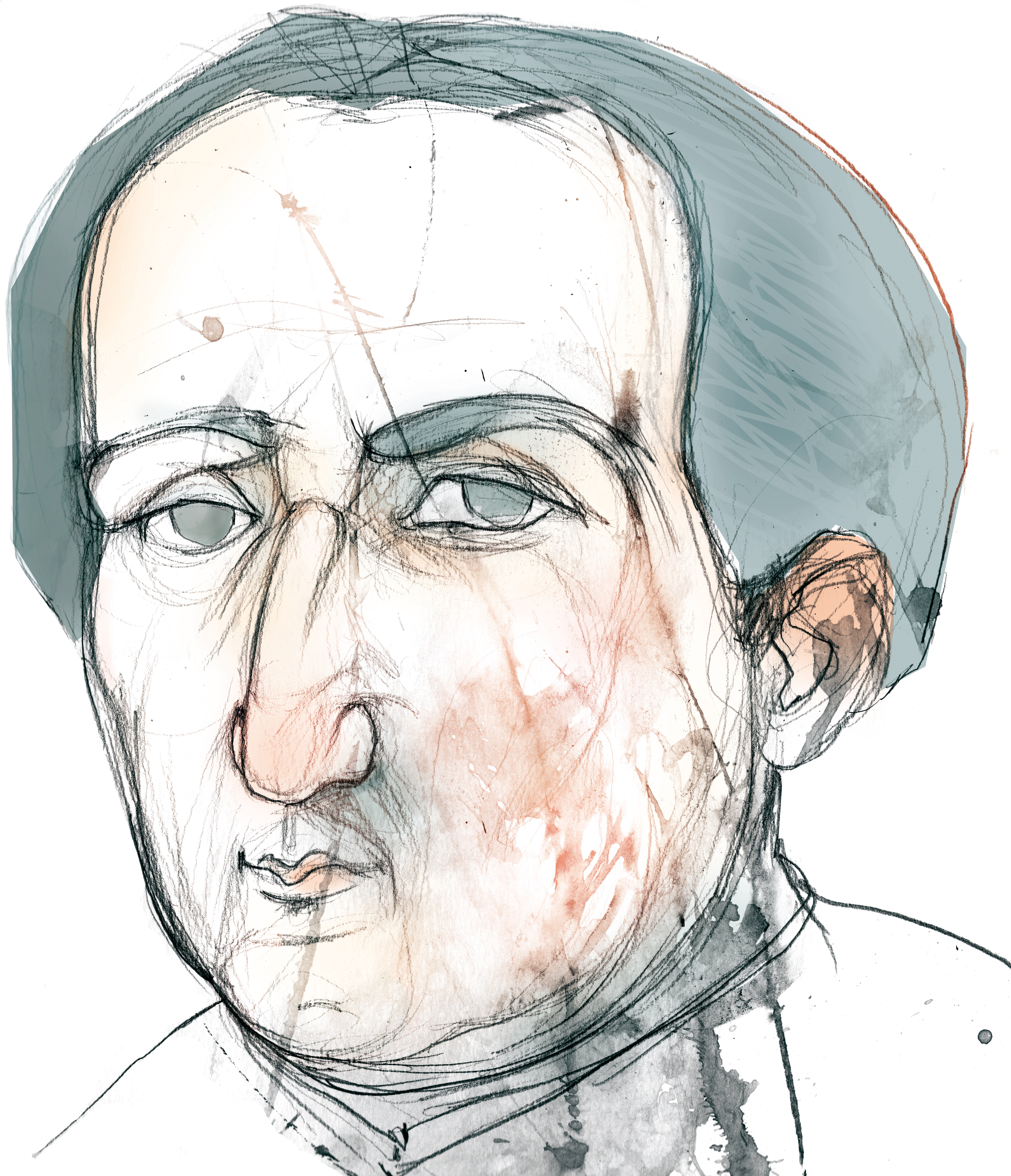
Zacuto, Eulogia Merle, 2011, National Museum of Science and Technology (Spain)

It is primarily a world history with specific attention to the Jewish plight, from creation to 1500. Sefer Yuhasin traces the chronology and development of the Oral Torah, and contains critical appraisal of Talmudic evidence. Zacuto expresses his view of the importance of familiarity with Roman history. He was familiar with Josippon but was apparently unfamiliar with the genuine Josephus; Samuel Shullam, his editor who published his annotated version in 1566, was familiar with the original Josephus, and inserted comments and glosses with corrections.

=== ibn Yahya ===
Italian talmudic chronologer Gedaliah ibn Yahya ben Joseph's (1515-1587) 1587 Shalshelet ha-Kabbalah (Chain of Tradition) was also of significance during this period. It included a justification of Aristotelian and Neoplatonic philosophy. The "chain of tradition" or the successor tradition is also used to refer to the continuation aspect of historians building on the shared reference base of works by creating introductions or citations to prior work, key to rabbinic textual analysis in the mishnah or mesorah well as Jewish historiography.

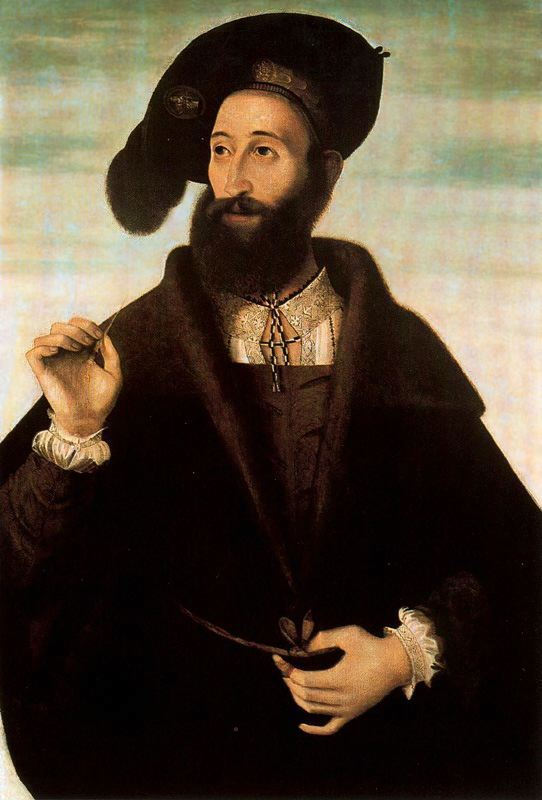
Abraham Farissol, Bartolomeo Veneto, (1525)

=== ibn Verga ===
Solomon ibn Verga (1460-1554)'s 1520 Scepter of Judah (Shevet Yehudah) was a notable chronicle of Jewish persecutions, written in Italy and published in the Ottoman Empire in 1550. It contains some 75 stories of Jewish persecution, and is a transitional work between the medieval and modern periods of Jewish history. Born in Spain, Verga's views were shaped by the expulsion in 1492, his forced baptism, and the massacres as he fled Portugal. Shevet Yehudah was "the first Jewish work whose main concern was the struggle against ritual murder accusations." It was cited by his contemporary Samuel Usque, Consolação às Tribulações de Israel ("Consolation for the Tribulations of Israel"), Ferrara, 1553. Usque was a trader. Rebecca Rist has called it a satirical work that blends fiction with history. Jeremy Cohen has said Verga was a pragmatist who presented benevolent and enlightened characters with a happy ending.

=== ha-Cohen ===
Joseph ha-Cohen (1496-1575) was a Sephardic physician and chronicler who is considered one of the most significant 16th-century Jewish historians and Renaissance scholars. Born in Avignon to Castilian and Aragonian Jewish parents and later in Genoa, he was cited and highly regarded by later historians such as Basnage. Emek Ha-Bakha (Vale of Tears), was started in 1558 and is considered an important historical work. The name comes from Psalm 84, and it is a history of Jewish martyrdom. It consisted of the narrative of Jewish persecution that extracted from and built on the Jewish part of his earlier world histories, and inspired Salo Baron's idea of the "lachrymose" conception of Jewish history. Yerushalmi notes that it begins in the post-biblical era. Bonfil notes that ha-Cohen's historiography is specifically shaped by the Jewish expulsion from Spain and France that ha-Cohen personally experienced. ha-Cohen's sources included Samuel Usque. ha-Cohen and Usque are sources for early documentation of Jewish blood libels. He was a contemporary of the Italian-Jewish geographer Abraham Farissol, a scribe from Avignon who worked for Judah Messer Leon, and drew upon his work. It incorporates earlier medieval chronicles almost verbatim.

=== dei Rossi ===
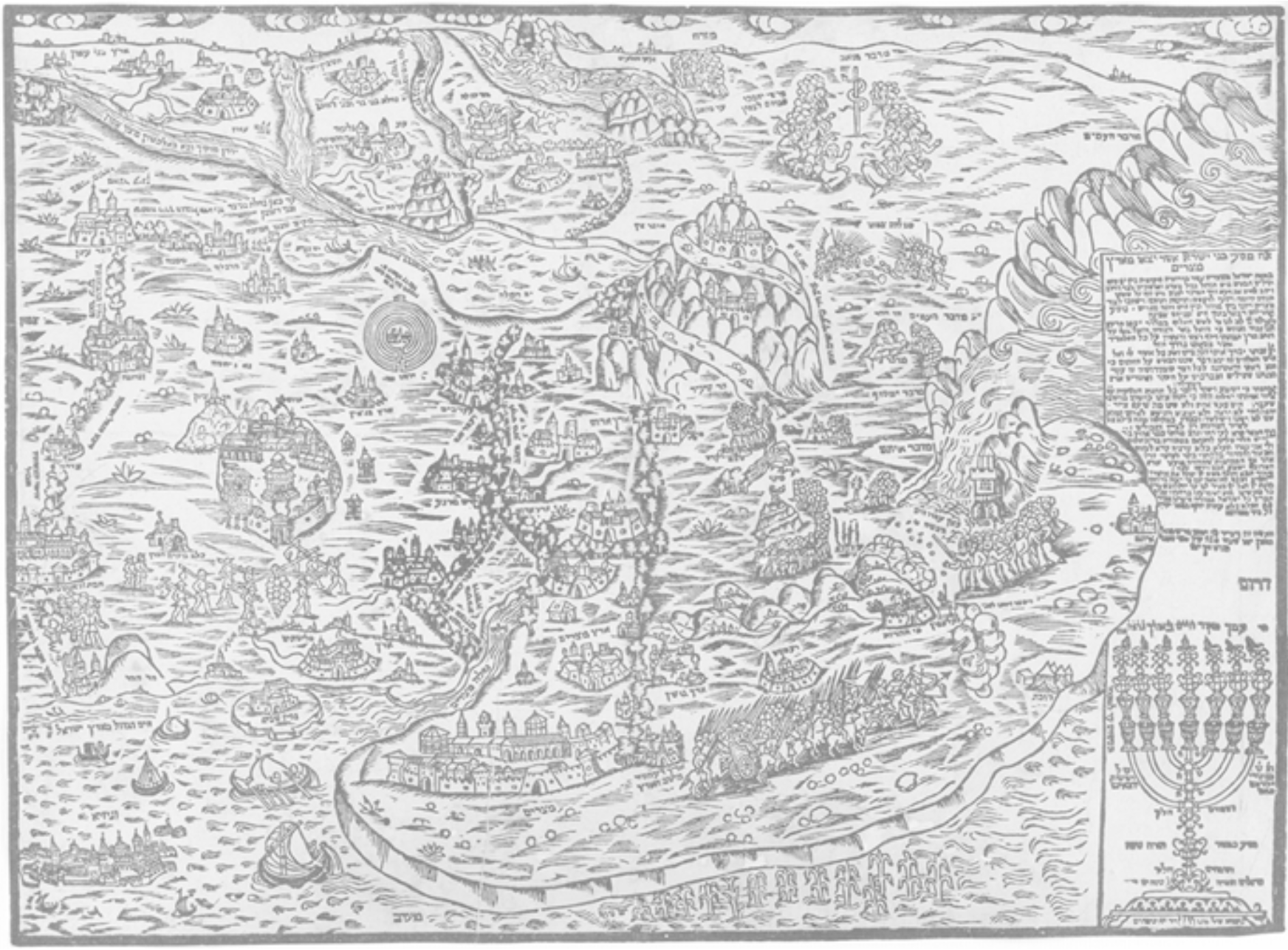
Map, Mantua, 1560, intended for a hagaddah, Central Library of Zurich

Azariah dei Rossi (1511-1578) was an Italian-Jewish physician, rabbi, and a leading Torah scholar during the Italian Renaissance. Born in Mantua, he translated classical works such as Aristotle, and was known to quote Roman and Greek writers along with Hebrew in his work. He is often considered the father of modern Jewish historiography. He was the first major author in Jewish historiography to incorporate and edit non-Jewish texts into his work. His 1573 work Me'or Einayim (Light of the Eyes) is an important early work of humanistic 16th century Jewish historiography. It includes a polemic critique of Philo noted by Baron and Norman Bentwich; Philo's work was popular among contemporary Italian Jews. Rossi drew on the Latin Josephus, with specific annotations on source text versions for the Jewish academies at Ferrara, and investigated the Septuagint. Bonfil writes that it was an attempt at a "New History" of the Jews and a work of ecclesiastical historiography, that adopted as its main tool, logical and philological criticism. Rossi also cited rabbinical material and Jewish writers such as Zacuto; Baron has also noted it was an apologetic work, and Bonfil has asserted ultimately a conservative work with a medieval worldview, but nonetheless pioneering in its critical study and methods.

De Rossi's work was critical of the rabbinical establishment, questioning the historicity of post-biblical Jewish legends, and was met with condemnation, opprobrium and bans; Joseph Caro called for it to be burned, though he died before this was carried out, and Samuel Judah Katzenellenbogen, the leader of the Venetian rabbis at the time, published herem prior to publication prohibiting owning or reading the book without permission. Rossi's work mixed the world of secular Renaissance scholarship with Jewish rabbinical textual analysis, addressing contradictions, which offended the sensibilities of religious leaders such as the Rabbi Judah Loew of Prague, known as the Maharal, who said the words of Torah should not mix with those of science. Signatories to the ban included important Jewish community scholars Yehiel Nissim da Pisa and Yehiel Trabot. Nonetheless, the rabbis of Mantua, Judah Moscato and David Provençal, although critical in some ways, still considered him a respectable Jew with great value.

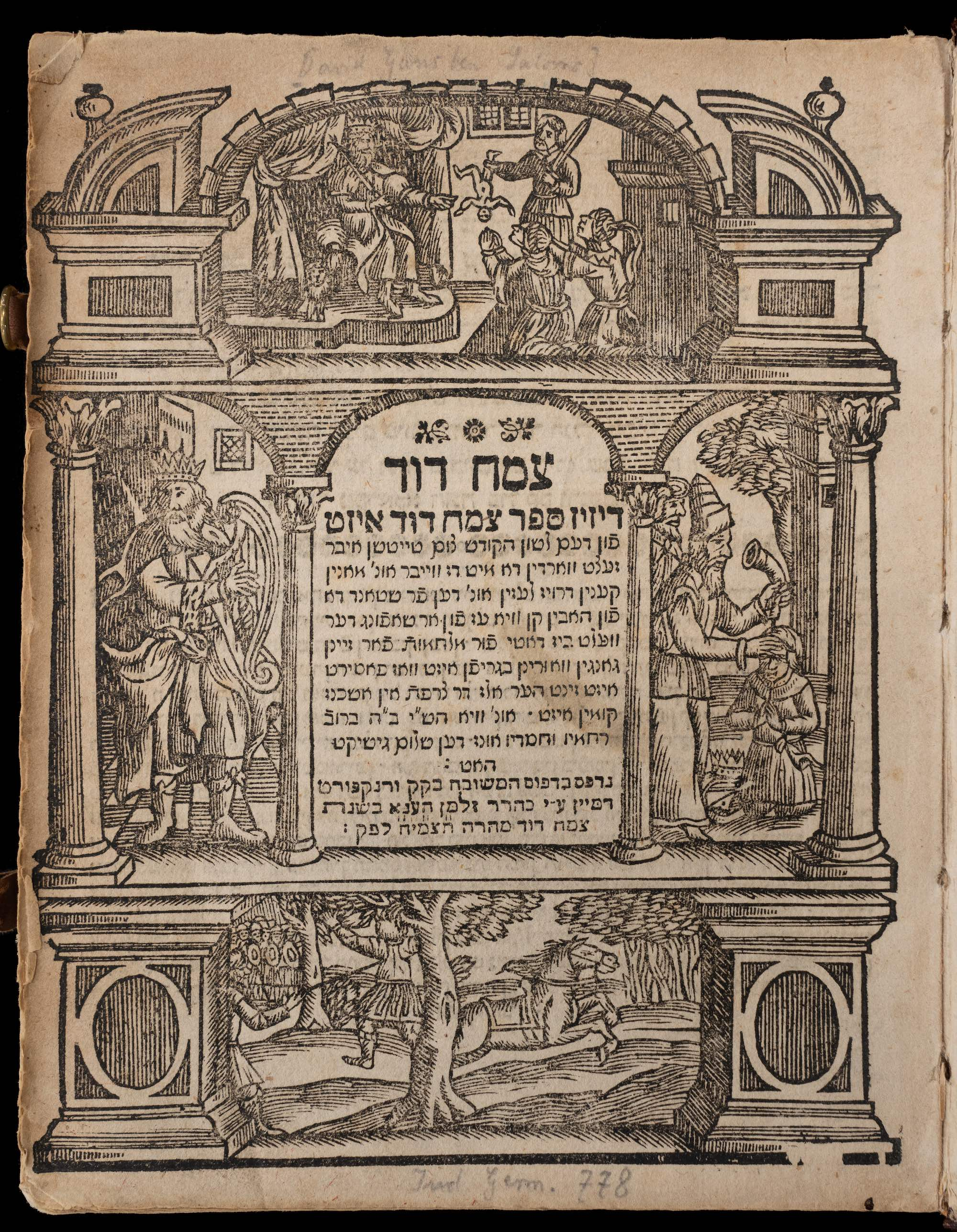
Tsemakh David, Frankfurt, 1698

Rossi went to Venice to argue his case with the rabbis who had charged him with heresy, who said he could publish if he would include David's brother Moses Provençal's defense of the traditional chronology, which he did along with his own response to the response. They also requested some passages to be deleted, which he yielded to; Abraham Coen Porto rescinded his veto, but the 1574 decree still held sway in limiting publication. Rossi sought help from the Catholics interested in bible study, and obtained an imprimatur from Marco Marini, a teacher of Hebrew and Latin in Venice. Marini taught Giacomo Boncompagno who requested Rossi translate Me'or Einyanim into Italian. Like Elijah Levita, Rossi became known for teaching Hebrew to Christians, earning disapproval from fellow Jews, but he did not convert. Rossi was cited by Christian Hebraists such as Bartolocci, Bochart, Buxtorf, Hottinger, Lowth, Voisin, and Morin.

Despite its controversial status, Rossi's work was known in the 17th and 18th centuries, per David Cassel and Zunz as relayed by Joanna Weinberg, individuals such as Joseph Solomon Delmedigo and Menasseh ben Israel considered it required reading. Baron considered Rossi an antiquarian; Bonfil posits he held a nationalistic view of Jewish history. Rossi's work is considered by modern historians to be an example of the construction of Jewish identity through modern historical methods.

=== Gans ===
David Gans (1541–1613) was a German-Jewish rabbi, astronomer, historian, and chronicler from Lippstadt, Westphalia, whose historical work Tzemach David, published in 1592, was a pioneering study of Jewish history. Gans wrote on a variety of liberal arts and scientific topics, making him unique among the Ashkenazi for his production of secular scholarship. Gans was a student of the Maharal, whom Yerushalmi says had the more profound ideas about Jewish history, and of Moses Isserles. Gans was the first Jewish scholar to use a telescope and the science of Copernicus. Gans also corresponded with secular astronomers such as Johannes Kepler and Tycho Brahe, and drew on August Gottlieb Spangenberg. Gans took inspiration from Josippon and Maimonides. Gans' work is a hybrid of two parallel stories of world and Jewish history. While not as cutting-edge a historian as his contemporary, de Rossi, his books introduced historiography to the Ashkenazi audience, making him a forerunner of subsequent developments in Jewish culture. Gans' work can be seen as a defense of the traditional dissemination of knowledge.

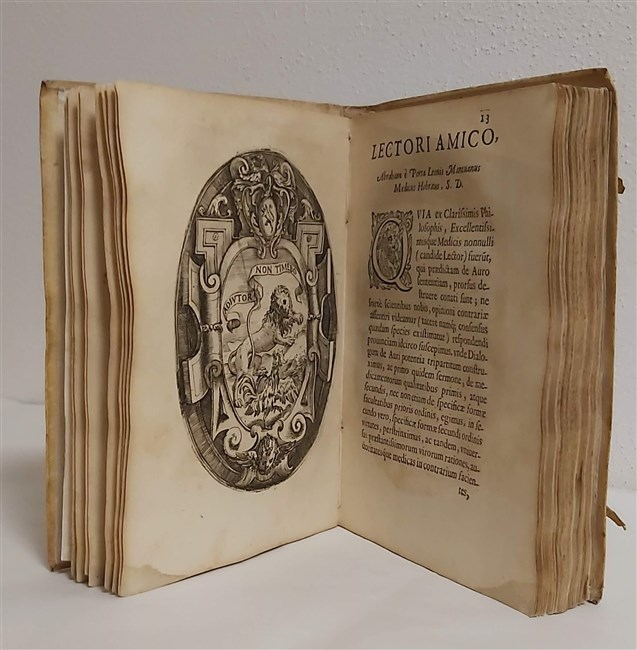
De auro dialogi tres. In quibus non solum de Auri in re Medica facultate verum etiam de specifica eius & caeterarum rerum forma ac duplici potestate qua mixtis in omnibus illa operatur copiose disputatur. Medico Hebraeo Auctore. Abraham ben David Portaleone, Baptistam a Porta, Venezia, 1584.

== 17th century ==
Abraham Portaleone was another Italian-Jewish Renaissance physician who, as discussed by Peter Miller and Moses Shulvass, published the historiographical work, Shilte ha-Giborim (Shields of the Heroes) in Mantua in 1612 which contained detailed descriptions of ancient life. Miller calls it a "complex" and "strange" "encyclopedic study." While ostensibly on the subject of the levitical tasks of the Temple, it touches on diverse topics such as botany, music, warfare, zoology, mineralogy, chemistry, and philology, and appears as a work of Renaissance scholarship per Samuel S. Kottek.

=== Conforte ===
David Conforte (1618) was a literary historian and compiler of Jewish bibliographic material from Salonica whose 17th century chronicle Kore ha-Dorot contains information on Sephardic rabbis from the Ottoman Empire and Italy in the 16th and 17th centuries, and relies on the rabbinic chain of tradition via Zacuto, Daud, and Yahya as well as responsa literature. It was reprinted in Warsaw in 1838 with an introduction by Jost, and by Cassel in 1846. This work contains historical information on extant yeshivot of the Jewish diaspora. According to Bonfil, likely motivated by the failure of Sabbateanism, the work explores the history of the Jewish people without mentioning that messianic movement. His work was also cited by Azulai.

=== Hannover ===
Nathan ben Moses Hannover's Yeven Mezulah (Abyss of Despair) (1653) is a chronicle of the Khmelnytsky massacres or pogroms in eastern Europe in the mid 17th century. While a massacre certainly occurred, accounts and casualty numbers differ among Ukrainian, Polish, and Jewish historians. All three groups also use the story as part of their own national ideologies.

=== Basnage ===
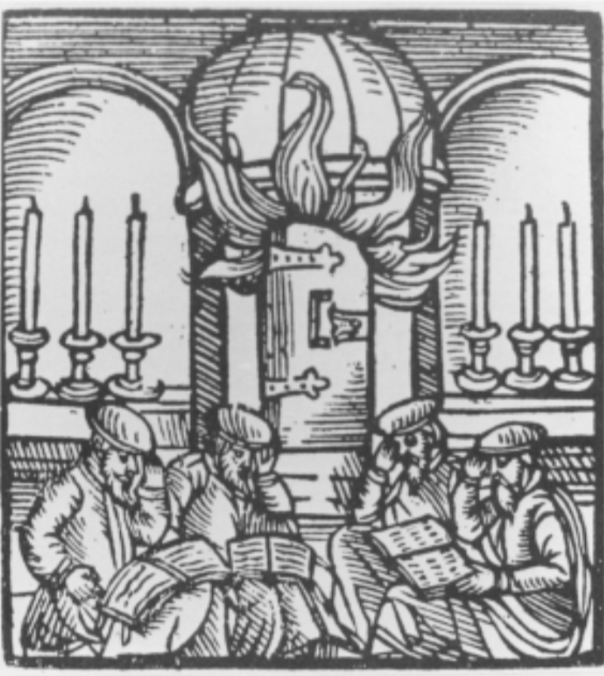
Jews in a synagogue with books, woodcut, Prague, 1617, reprinted in Rubens, 1971

Jacques Basnage (1653-1723), a Huguenot living in the Netherlands, was one of the first authors in the modern era to publish a comprehensive post-biblical history of the Jews. Basnage aimed to recount the story of the Jewish religion in his work Histoire des juifs, depuis Jésus-Christ jusqu'a present. Pour servir de continuation à l'histoire de Joseph (1706, in 15 volumes). Basnage heavily cites early modern and medieval Sephardic Jewish historians, such as Isaac Cardoso, Leon Modena, Abraham ibn Daud, Josippon, and Joseph ha-Cohen (whom he called "the best historian this nation has had since Josephus"), but also drew on Christian sources such as Jesuit Juan de Mariana.

It was said to be the first modern comprehensive post-biblical history of Judaism and became the authoritative work for 100 years; Basnage, quoted by Yerushalmi, believed no such work had ever been published before. Basnage sought to provide an objective account of the history of Judaism. His work was widely influential, and developed further by other authors such as Hannah Adams. Basnage's work is considered the birth of the "Christian historiography" of Jewish history.

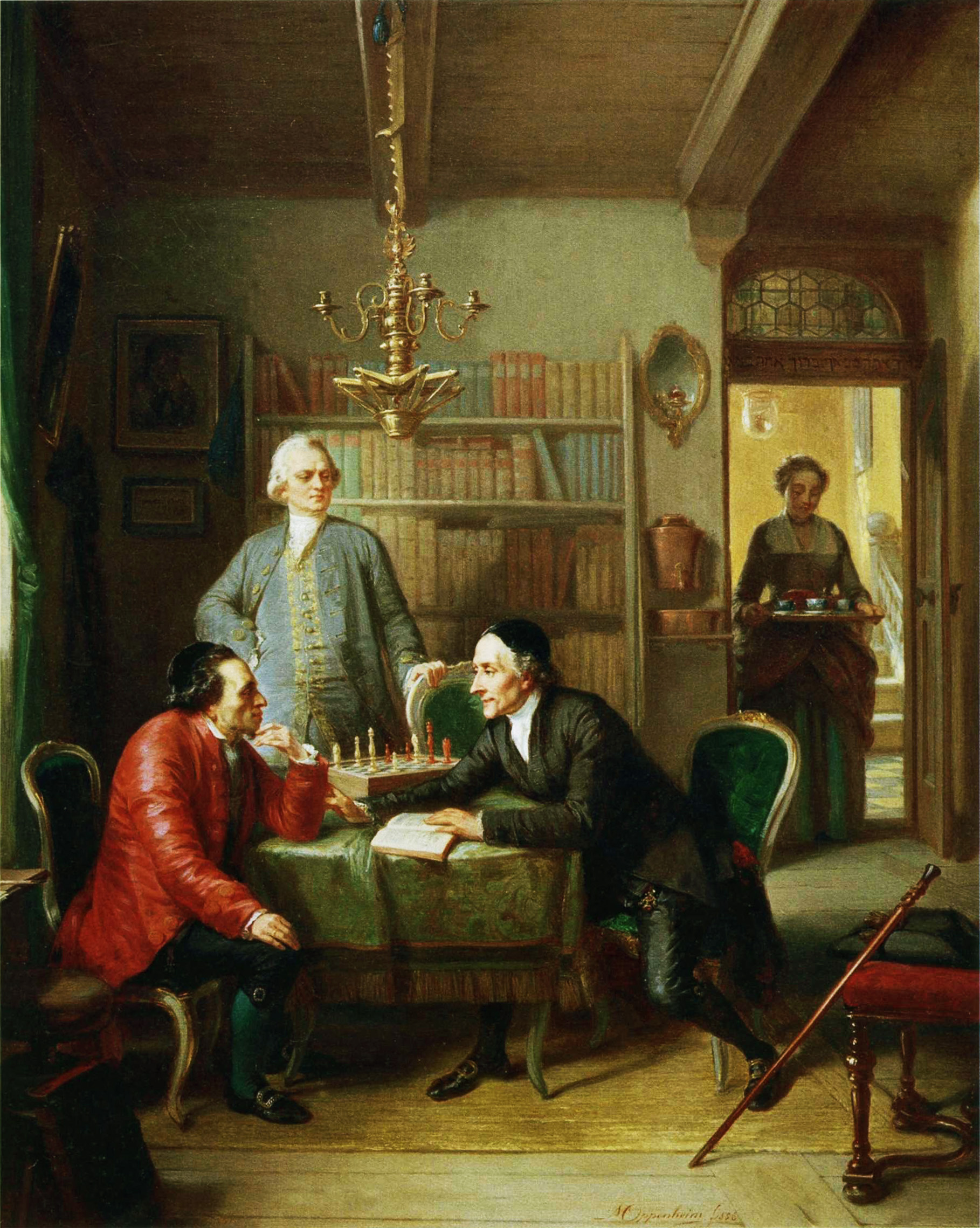
Mendelssohn, Lavater and Lessing, in an imaginary portrait by the Jewish artist Moritz Daniel Oppenheim (1856). Collection of the Judah L. Magnes Museum

== 18th century ==
=== Mendelssohn and the haskalah ===
In the 18th century, reformists such as Moses Mendelssohn (1729-1786) invoked Maimonides to pursue a rational emancipationist movement for German Jews. Mendelssohn has a significant role in Jewish history and the Haskalah or Jewish enlightenment. One of Mendelssohn's central goals concerned a grounding in Jewish history. Isaac Euchel (1756-1804)'s Toledot Rabbenu Moshe ben Menahem (1788) was the first biography of Mendelssohn and significant in beginning a movement of biographical studies in Jewish historiography. Meyer notes that Euchel acknowledges that Mendelssohn began his secular studies in history. Israel Zamosz, one of Mendelssohn's teachers, also published a work applying reason and science to the statements of talmudic authorities.

According to David B. Ruderman, the maskilim were inspired by such medieval and early modern historians and thinkers as Judah Messer Leon, de Rossi, ibn Verga, Moscato, Portaleone, Tobias Cohen, Simone Luzzatto, Menasseh ben Israel, and Isaac Orobio de Castro. Rossi's Me'or Einayim was republished by Isaac Satanow in 1794. Satanow wrote on education and encouraged the study of science and enlightenment philosophy, citing David Gans. According to Funkenstein as related by David Sorkin, the development of the Haskalah was related to classical liberalism, citing Mendelssohn's influence by Thomas Hobbes.

The Haskalah made education a priority and produced pedagogical literature in the humanistic vein, such as that of Satanow and David Friedländer. The Haskalah became interested in Sephardic Jewish sources and had an idea of historiography with an eye toward reformism. The scholarship of the Sephardim held a mystique for emancipated German Jews who had an opportunity to redefine their identities. They held manuscripts in held esteem, and superior to other types of sources.

=== Azulai, Vilna Gaon ===
The travel diary of Chaim Yosef David Azulai (1724-1806) is one important source for information on the broader Jewish world during this period. The Vilna Gaon was another figure that encouraged critical reading of text and scientific study during this period.

=== Prague: Beer, Löwisohn, Fischer ===
Prague was a major center of Jewish scholarship before the 19th century, with maskilim Peter Beer (1758-1838), Salomo Löwisohn (1789-1821), and Marcus Fischer (1788-1858) making it a center for Jewish historical production.

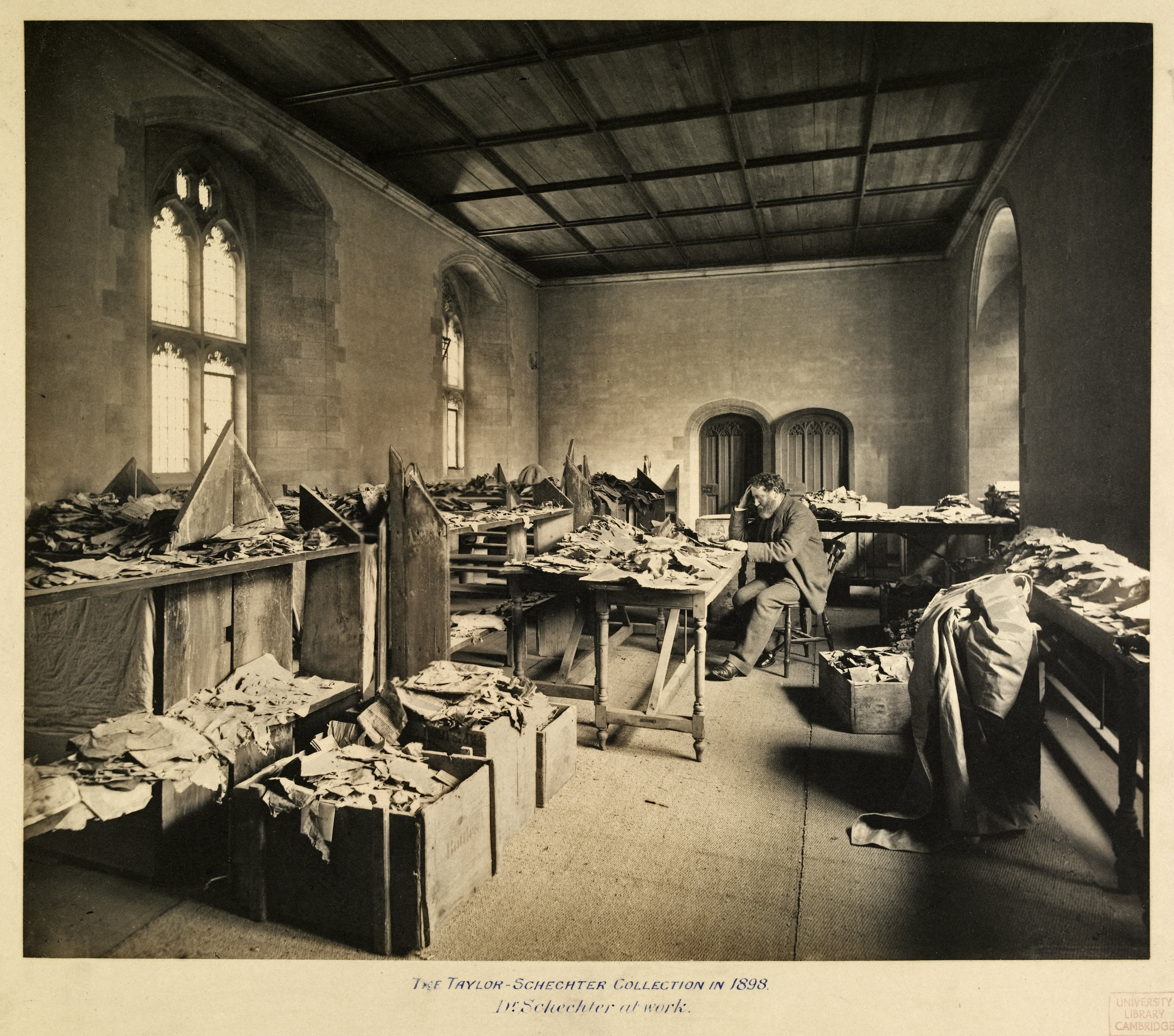
Solomon Schechter studying the fragments of the Cairo Geniza, 1898 (Cambridge University)

=== Amelander ===
Menahem Amelander (also called Menahem ben Solomon ha-Levi or Menahem Mann) in the Netherlands translated Josippon. He also drew on Basnage. His 1743 work Sheyris Yisroel (Remnant of Israel) picks up where Josippon left off. It is a continuation of his Yiddish translation of Josippon with a general history of the Jews in the diaspora until 1740. Max Erik and Israel Zinberg considered it the foremost representative of its genre. It was cited by Abraham Trebitsch with his Qorot ha-'Ittim and Abraham Chaim Braatbard with his Ayn Naye Kornayk. Zinberg called it "the most important work of Old Yiddish historiographical literature".

=== Heilprin ===
The Lithuanian rabbi Jehiel ben Solomon Heilprin (1660-1746)'s Seder HaDoroth (1768) was another 18th century historical work which cited the earlier work by Gans, ibn Yahya and Zacuto as well as other medieval work such as the itinerary of Benjamin of Tudela.

=== Krochmal ===
Nachman Krochmal (1785–1840) was a major representative of the Galician haskalah, who presented a universal theory of "organismic-cyclical" Jewish history, and believed that Jews defied the laws of human history.

== 19th century and birth of modern Jewish studies ==
Yosef Hayim Yerushalmi wrote that first modern professional Jewish historians appeared in the early 19th century, writing that "[v]irtually all nineteenth-century Jewish ideologies, from Reform to Zionism, would feel a need to appeal to history for validation". He has further explained that the 19th century themes of martyrology and the chain of rabbinic tradition were a line of continuation from the medieval era; Daniel Frank has suggested a corollary, that Jewish history had tended to focus on these themes and ignore threads without clear expression of them.

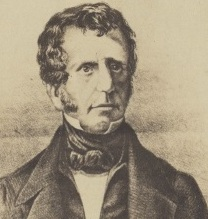
Jost, Anton Goldschmidt, Shavadron collection, National Library of Israel

The German Wissenschaft des Judentums (or the "science of Judaism" or "Jewish studies") movement, was founded by Isaac Marcus Jost, Leopold Zunz, Heinrich Heine, Solomon Judah Loeb Rapoport, and Eduard Gans, and was the birth of modern academic Jewish studies. Although a rationalist movement, it also drew on spiritual sources such as Yehuda Halevi's Kuzari. Zunz started the movement in 1818 with his Etwas.

Another important father of the movement was Immanuel Wolf whose essay Über den Begriff einer Wissenschaft des Judentums (On the Concept of Jewish Studies) in 1822 proposed a structure for Jewish studies, and indicated a modern notion of Jewish peoplehood. Wolf was a German idealist who dealt with Judaism in systematic, universal, Hegelian terms.

David Cassel was a notable historian and student of Zunz. Edouard Gans was one of Hegel's students.

Abraham Geiger founded the Hochschule für die Wissenschaft des Judentums or school/seminary for Jewish studies, in Berlin in 1872, which remained until it was shuttered by the Nazis in 1942.

Solomon Schechter was an important Moldavian-born, later British-American rabbi. A student of the Hochschule, he went on to start his own American school, become president of synagogues and was influential in the development of Conservative Judaism in the United States. He was also influential in British and American Jewish education. Schechter became aware of the Cairo Geniza and was instrumental in bringing the documents to Cambridge University Library and the Jewish Theological Seminary for study.

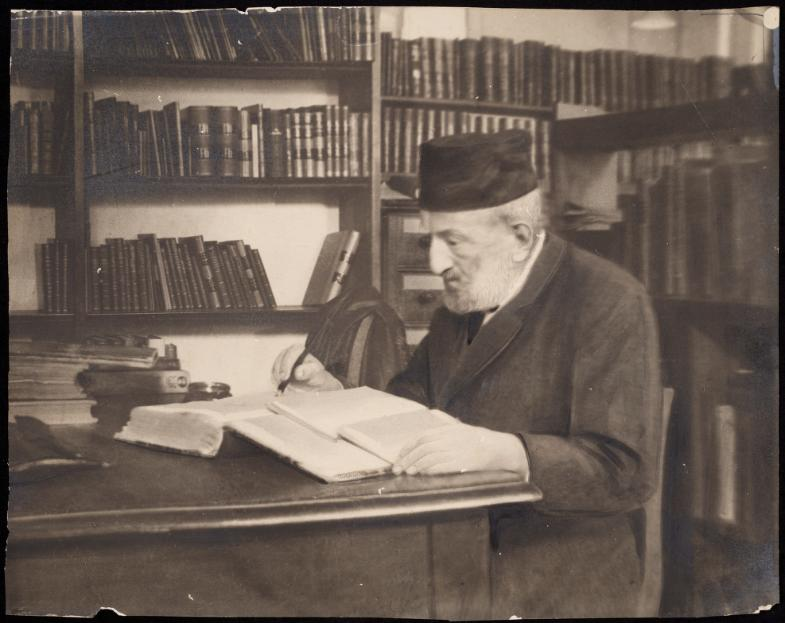
Moritz Steinschneider (1816–1907), Germany, Leo Baeck Institute

Adolph Jellinek was a rabbi, publisher and pamphleteer who spoke and wrote emphatically against antisemitism, and republished medieval works from the Crusades era and history from the early modern period such as ha-Kohen's Emeq ha-Bakha.

The Wissenschaft has been called "institutionalized German historicism," and a number of historians from Funkenstein to Meyer to Shmuel Feiner and Louise Hecht have challenged Yerushalmi's interpretation that the 19th century narrative is the salient shift in the characterization of Jewish historiography into modernity.

The Wissenschaft was drawn to suppressed and heretical traditions, such as Hellenistic Jewish philosophy and Spinozism, while simultaneously pulled by 18th-century rationalism, which caused them to discard Kabbalah and mysticism.

Significant work from the 19th century included Moritz Steinschneider (1816-1907)'s Geschichtsliteratur der Juden. Steinschneider became the preeminent scholar of the period. The work of Julius Fürst was also significant.

Théodore Reinach (1860-1928)'s Histoire des Israelites (1884) is the most significant example of 19th-century French-Jewish historiography which is something of a counterpoint to the mainstream German development in this time. Marco Mortara (1815-1894) can be considered an Italian-Jewish version. Isidore Loeb (1839-1892) founded the Revue des Études Juives or Jewish studies review, in 1880 in Paris. British Jews Claude Montefiore and Israel Abrahams founded The Jewish Quarterly Review, an English counterpart, in 1889. Emmanuel Levinas, a Lithuanian-French philosopher, offered a "new science of Judaism" critique of the Wissenschaft pertaining to Jewish particularism.

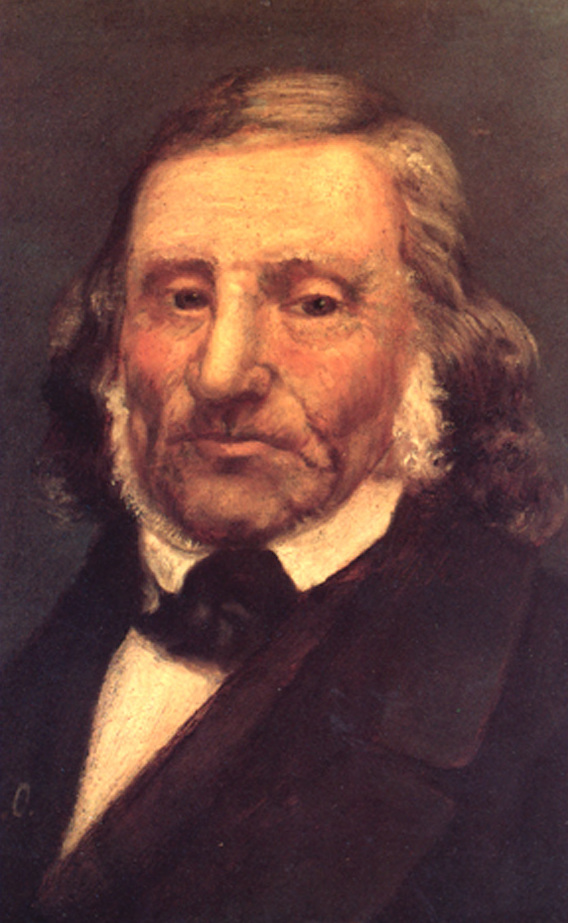
Leopold Zunz (portrait by Moritz Daniel Oppenheim)

Forerunners to Jewish national Zionist historiography from the 19th century include Peretz Smolenskin, Abraham Shalom Friedberg, and Saul Pinchas Rabinowitz, part of the Hibbat Zion movement, leading to Ahad Ha'am.

=== Jost ===
Isaak Markus Jost (1793-1860) was the first Jewish author to publish a comprehensive post-biblical modern history of the Jews. His Geschichte der Israeliten seit den Zeit der Maccabaer, in 9 volumes (1820–1829), was the first comprehensive history of Judaism from Biblical to modern times by a Jewish author. It primarily focused on recounting the history of the Jewish religion.

Jost's history left "the differences among various phases of the Jewish past clearly apparent". He was criticized for this by later scholars such as Graetz, who worked to create an unbroken narrative.

Unlike Zunz, Jost has an anti-rabbinical stance, and sought to free Jewish history from Christian theology. He saw influence from Greco-Roman law and philosophy in Jewish philosophy, and sought to secularize Jewish history.

=== Zunz ===
Leopold Zunz (1794-1886), a colleague of Jost, was considered the father of academic Jewish studies in universities, or Wissenschaft des Judentums (or the "science of Judaism"). Zunz' article Etwas über die rabbinische Litteratur ("On Rabbinical Literature"), published in 1818, was a manifesto for modern Jewish scholarship. Zunz was influenced by Rossi's philological and comparative linguistics approach. Though they were childhood friends, Zunz had a harsh and perhaps jealous criticism of Jost's earlier work and sought to improve on it. Zunz was a student of August Böckh and Friedrich August Wolf and they influenced his work.

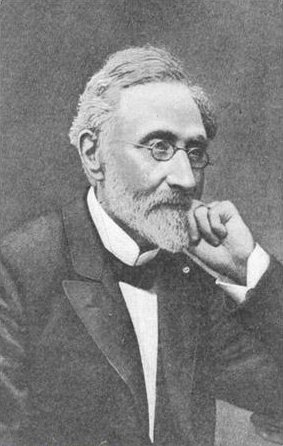
Heinrich Graetz, ca. 1885

Zunz urged his contemporaries to, through the embrace of study of a wide swath of literature, grasp the geist or "spirit" of the Jewish people. Zunz proposed an ambitious Jewish historiography and further proposed that Jewish people adopt history as a way of life. Zunz not only proposed a university vision of Jewish studies, but believed Jewish history to be an inseparable part of human culture. Zunz's historiographical view aligns with the "lachrymose" view of Jewish history of persecution. Zunz was the least philosophically inclined of the Wissenschaft but the most devoted to scholarship. Zunz called for an "emanicipation" of Jewish scholarship "from the theologians." He was the editor of Nachman Krochmal.

Contrasting with earlier bible printing, Zunz adopted a re-Hebraization of names.

Zunz was politically active and was elected to office. He believed that Jewish emancipation would come out of universal human rights. The revolutionary year of 1848 had an influence on Zunz, and he expressed a messianic eagerness in the ideals of equality. Zunz's stated goal was to transform Prussia into a democratic republic.

=== Graetz ===
Heinrich Graetz (1817-1891) was one of the first modern historians to write a comprehensive history of the Jewish people from a specifically Jewish perspective. Geschichte der Juden (History of the Jews) (1853-1876) had a dual focus. While he provided a comprehensive history of the Jewish religion, he also highlighted the emergence of a Jewish national identity and the role of Jews in modern nation-states. Graetz sought to improve on Jost's work, which he disdained for lacking warmth and passion.

Salo Baron later identified Graetz with the "lachrymose conception" of Jewish history which he sought to critique.

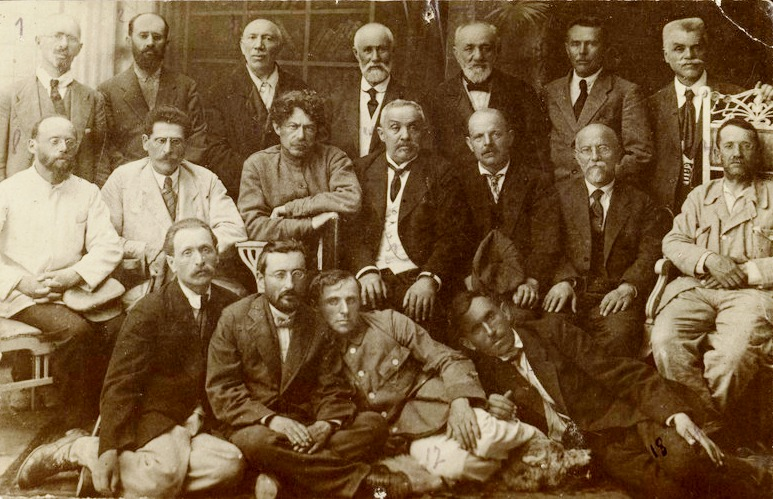
Ben-Zion Dinur (far left, middle row) with Hebrew writers, leaving Odessa, 1921

Baruch Ben-Jacob (1886-1943) likewise criticized Graetz' "sad and bitter" narrative for omitting Ottoman Jews. Graetz was also meaningfully challenged by Hermann Cohen and Zecharias Frankel.

== 20th century ==
The 20th century saw the Shoah and the establishment of Israel, both of which had a major impact on Jewish historiography.

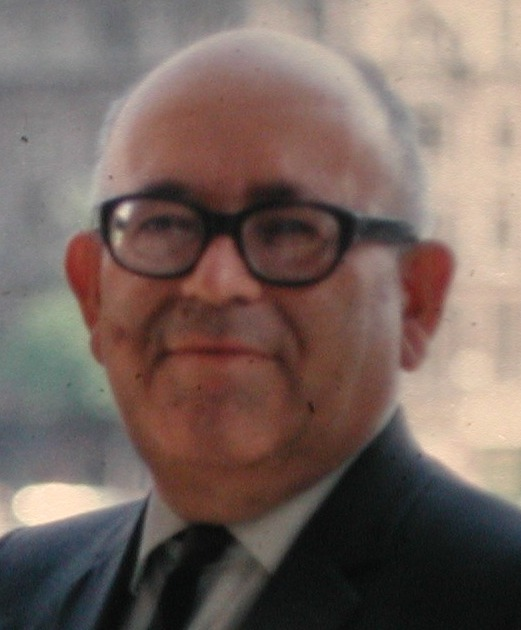
Ben-Sasson, 1917

Ephraim Deinard (1846–1930) was a notable 20th century historian of American Jews. The writings of Gershom Scholem and Hannah Arendt are also important in modern Jewish historiography of the 1940s. Scholem was a critic of the Wissenschaft for their history that had omitted Jewish mysticism. Martin Buber also was a significant exponent of Jewish mysticism building on the work of Scholem in the 20th century.

While most of the historians associated with the Wissenschaft were men, Selma Stern (1890-1981) was the first woman associated with the movement and one of the first professional female historians in Germany.

Jacob Katz was a pioneering social historian of Jewish history.

=== Dubnow ===
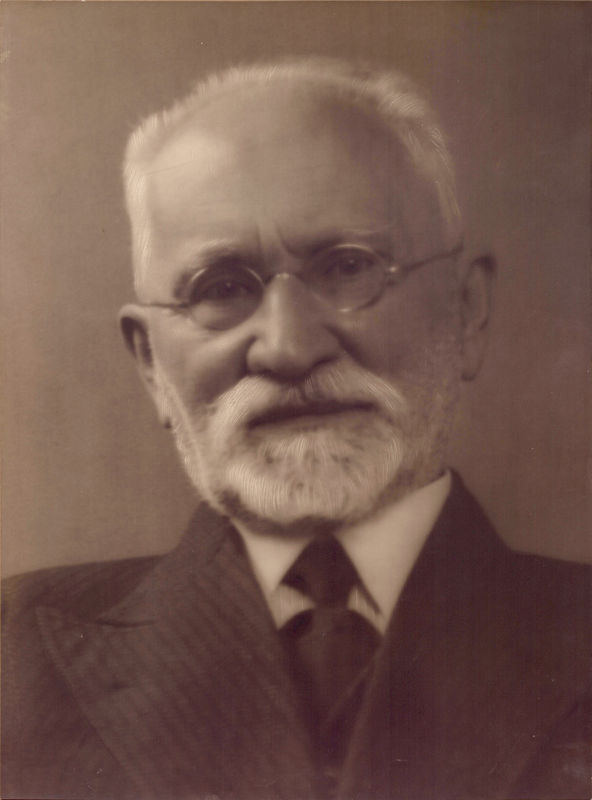
Simon Dubnow (1930s)

Simon Dubnow (1860-1941) wrote Weltgeschichte des Jüdischen Volkes (World History of the Jewish People), which focused on the history of Jewish communities across the world. His scholarship developed a unified Jewish national narrative, especially in the context of the Russian Revolution and Zionism. Dubnow's work nationalized and secularized Jewish history, whilst also moving its modern center of gravity from Germany to Eastern Europe and shifting its focus from intellectual history to social history. Michael Brenner commented that Yerushalmi's "faith of fallen Jews" observation "is probably applicable to no one more than to Dubnow, who claimed to be praying in the temple of history that he himself erected."

=== Dinur ===
Ben-Zion Dinur (1884 – 1973) followed Dubnow with a Zionist version of Jewish history. Conforti writes that Dinur "provided Jewish historiography with a clear Zionist-nationalist structure... [and] established the Palestine-centric approach, which viewed the entire Jewish past through the prism of Eretz Israel".

Dinur was the first Zionist scholar to study the fate of Jewish communities in Palestine during the Crusades.

=== Baron ===
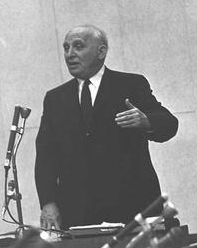
Prof. Baron testifying at Adolf Eichmann's trial (1961)

Salo Wittmayer Baron (1895-1989), a professor at Columbia University, became the first chair in Jewish history at a secular university; the chair at Columbia is now named after him. Born in Tarnów, he was ordained at the Jewish Theological Seminary in Vienna, Austria in 1920. He joined the faculty at Columbia in 1930, and starting in 1950 he directed Columbia's Institute for Israel and Jewish Studies, where he worked until retirement in 1963. He published 13 works of Jewish history. His student Yerushalmi called him the greatest 20th century historian of Jewish history. His A Social and Religious History of the Jews (18 vols., 2d ed. 1952–1983) covered both the religious and social aspects of Jewish history. His work is the most recent comprehensive multi-volume Jewish history.

Baron's work further developed the Jewish national history, particularly in the wake of the Holocaust and the establishment of Israel. Baron called for Jews and Jewish historical studies to be integrated into traditional general world history as a key part. Baron sought to balance the tendencies toward extremes of traditionalism or modernity, seeking a third way on the question of emancipation. While Baron's earlier work was periodic, in The Jewish Community he analyzed a Jewish community that transcended time, per Elisheva Carlebach. Amnon Raz‐Krakotzkin says Baron's historiography is a call to view Jewish history as counter-history. In contrast to Baer and the Zionist historians, Baron believed the diaspora to be a critical source of strength and vitality. While Baron was mainly criticizing the lachrymose conception of medieval Jewish history, "neobaronianism" has been proposed by David Engel to apply more generally.

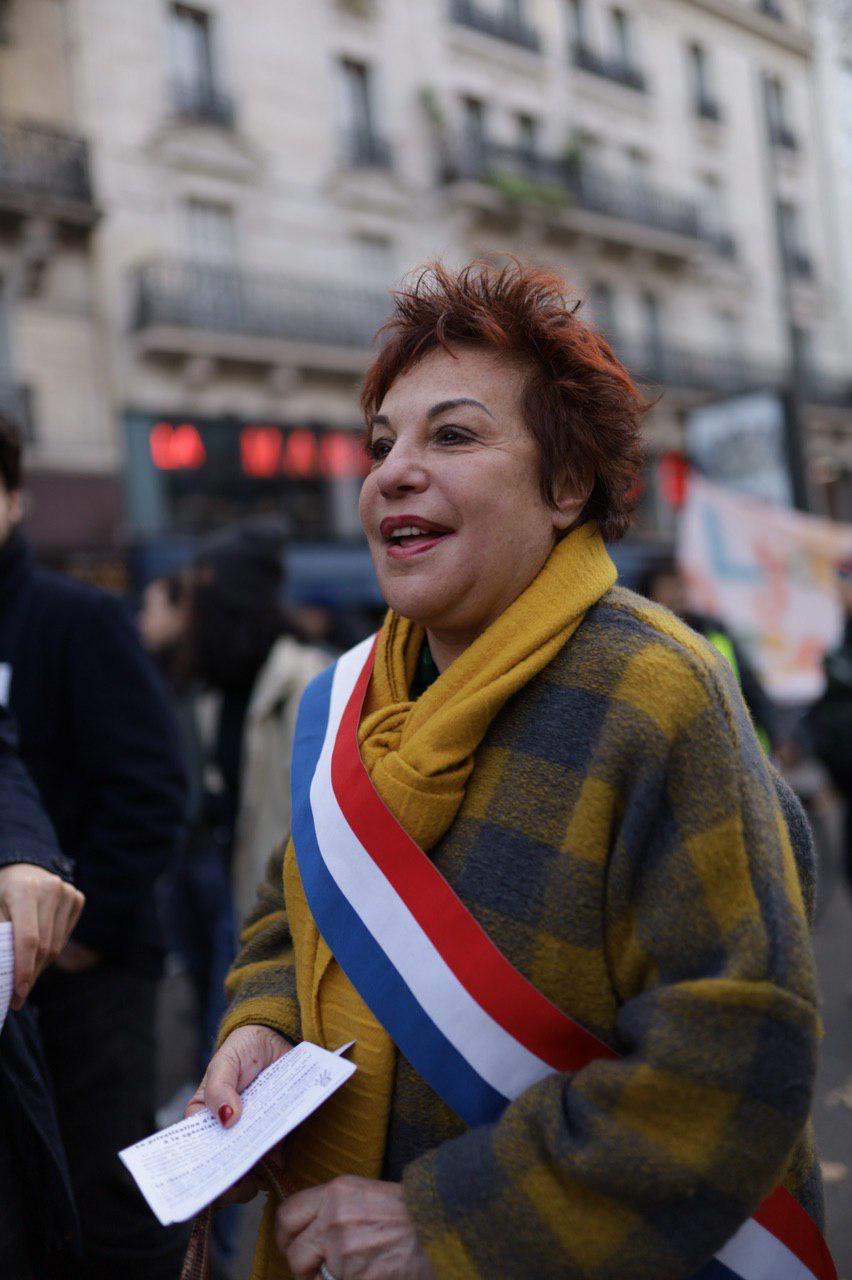
Esther Benbassa, French senator and historian, 2019

Baron admired and even revered Graetz, who was an influence on him, but he sought to counter and critique the historical view espoused by the older historian. Engel says the Baronian view of history stresses continuities, rather than ruptures. Baron's analysis of Jewish historiography runs through Zacuto, Hacohen, Ibn Verga, to Jost, Graetz, and Dubnow. Baron believed older work to be "parochial." Adam Teller says his work is an alternative to history motivated by persecution and antisemitism, at the risk of de-emphasizing the impact of violence on Jewish history. Esther Benbassa is another critic of the lachrymose conception and says that Baron is joined by Cecil Roth and to a lesser extent Schorsch in restoring a less tragic vision of Jewish fate.

=== Baer ===
Yitzhak Baer (1888-1980) made a significant contribution to medieval and modern Jewish historiography. He had a critique of Baron's view that had failed to take into account his friend Gershom Sholem's studies of Jewish mysticism and Jewish messianism. Baer aligned his approach with Israeli Zionist historians such as Dinur and Hayim Hillel Ben-Sasson. Moshe Idel considers Baer a "historian's historian" and possibly the most important historian at the Hebrew University since its inception, and the founder of the Jerusalem School of Jewish history. Baer's periodization considers Jewish history one long period from the end of the Second Temple until the Enlightenment.

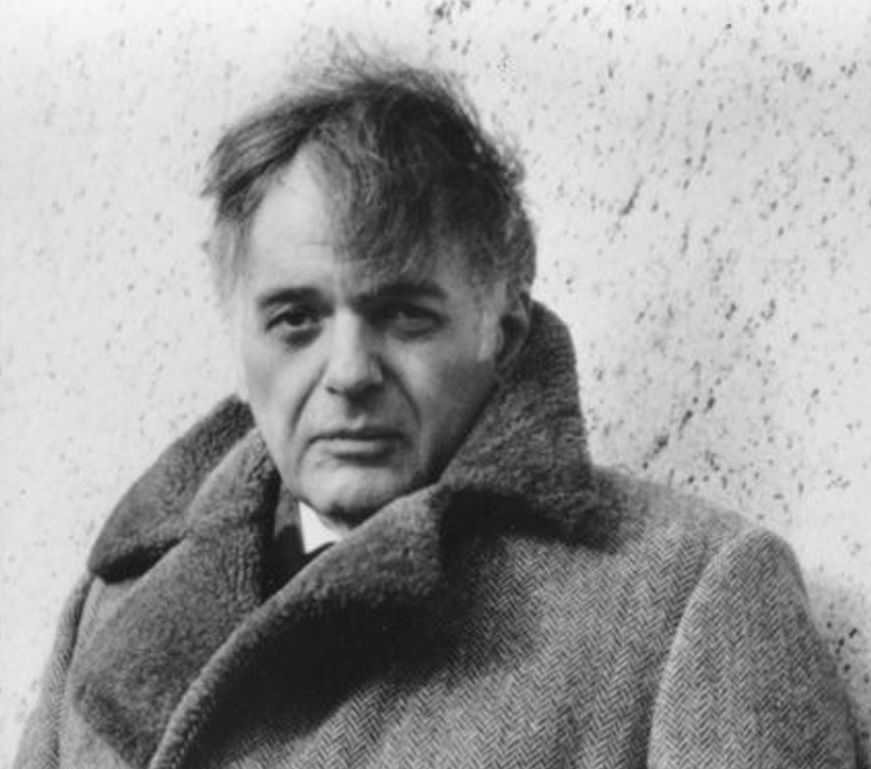
Yerushalmi, 1989

== Later 20th century: history of historiography ==
Jewish historiography also developed uniquely in Jewish diaspora communities such as Anglo-Jewish historiography, Polish-Jewish historiography, and American-Jewish historiography. History of women and Jewish women in particular became more widespread in the 1980s, such as the work of Paula Hyman and Judith Baskin.

Beginning around 1970, a new Polish-Jewish historiography gradually arose, driven by reprints of works by Zinberg, Dubnow, and Baron, as well as new consideration by Bernard Dov Weinryb. Relevant authors in Polish-Jewish historiography are Meier Balaban, Yitzhak Schipper and Moses Schorr.

The concept of microhistory has also arisen to describe a new movement in Jewish history led by Francesca Trivellato and Carlo Ginzburg. Steven Bowman is the recipient of a Fulbright Fellowship and filled a gap in the study of Greek Jews.

Hasia Diner wrote history of everyday Jewish communities while questioning myths and received wisdom.

=== Yerushalmi ===
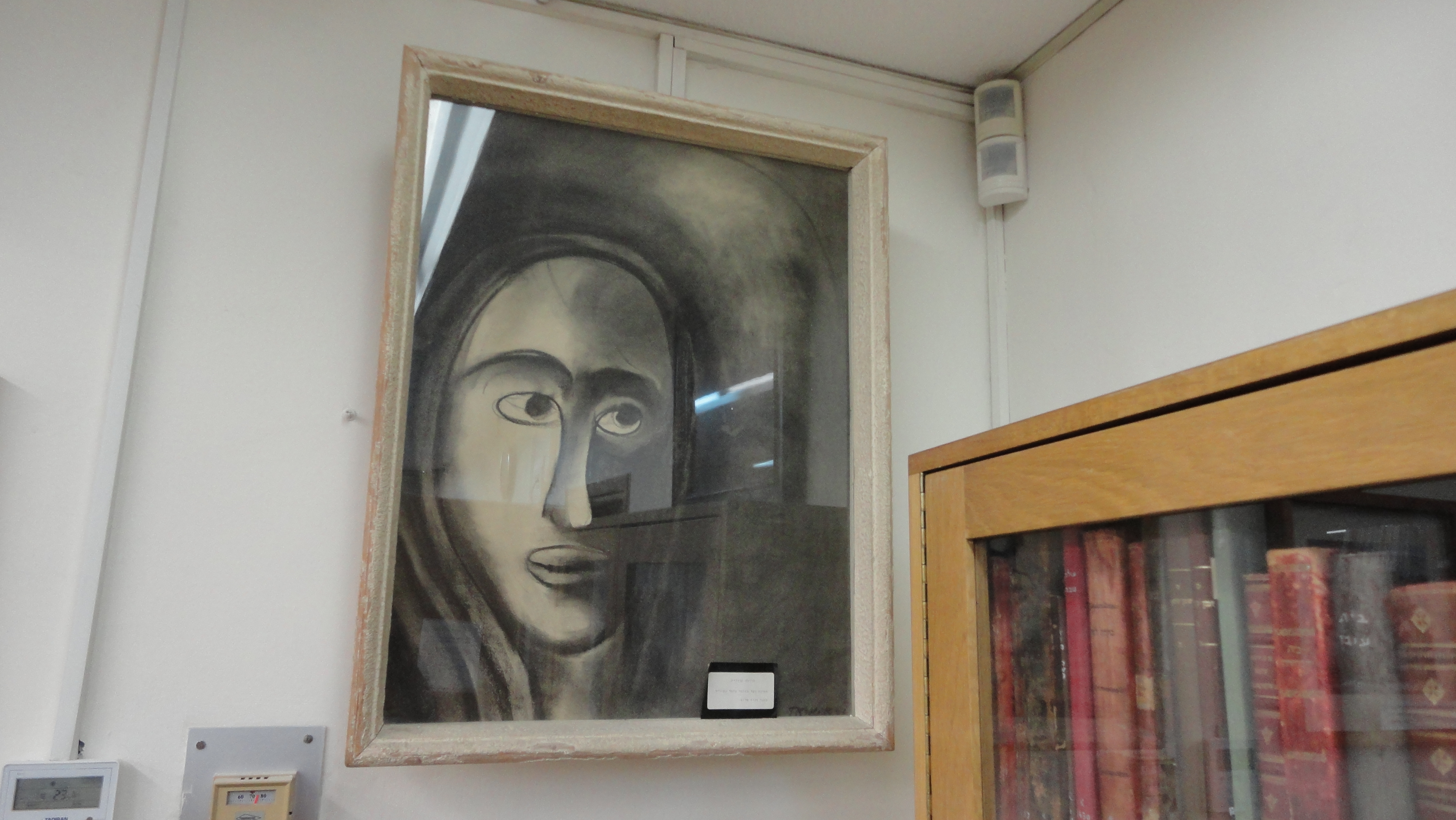
1947 drawing, Trude Krolik, Scholem, National Library of Israel

Yosef Hayim Yerushalmi (1932-2009) wrote Zakhor: Jewish History and Jewish Memory (1982) which explored the intersection of historical scholarship and Jewish collective memory, including mythology, religion and assimilation. The term Zakhor is an imperative "Remember," and the book discusses the author's perception of the decay in memory and the impact on the Jewish psyche; his core belief is that one can never stop being Jewish. It has been described as the "pathbreaking study on the relationship between Jewish historiography and memory from the biblical period to the modern age".

Yerushalmi's work can be viewed largely as critique of the Wissenschaft. He was influenced by his teacher, Salo Baron, whose classes he attended at Columbia University where he later taught, and saw himself as a social historian of Jews, not of Judaism. Yerushalmi was born and lived most of his life in New York City, aside from a stint at Harvard University in Cambridge, Massachusetts. Whilst Yerushalmi's work largely centered on premodern Jewish histories, it set the stage for future analysis of modern Jewish histories, per his student Brenner. Yerushalmi deeply studied the Sephardim, such as Isaac Cardoso, particularly the marrano or converso, i.e. crypto-Jewish or forced Catholic secular Jews, which were a core historical interest. In addition to his work on the Sephardim, Yerushalmi's history also focused on German Jewish, not Eastern European Jewish social history, despite being American Eastern European Jewish himself. Yerushalmi wrote that:

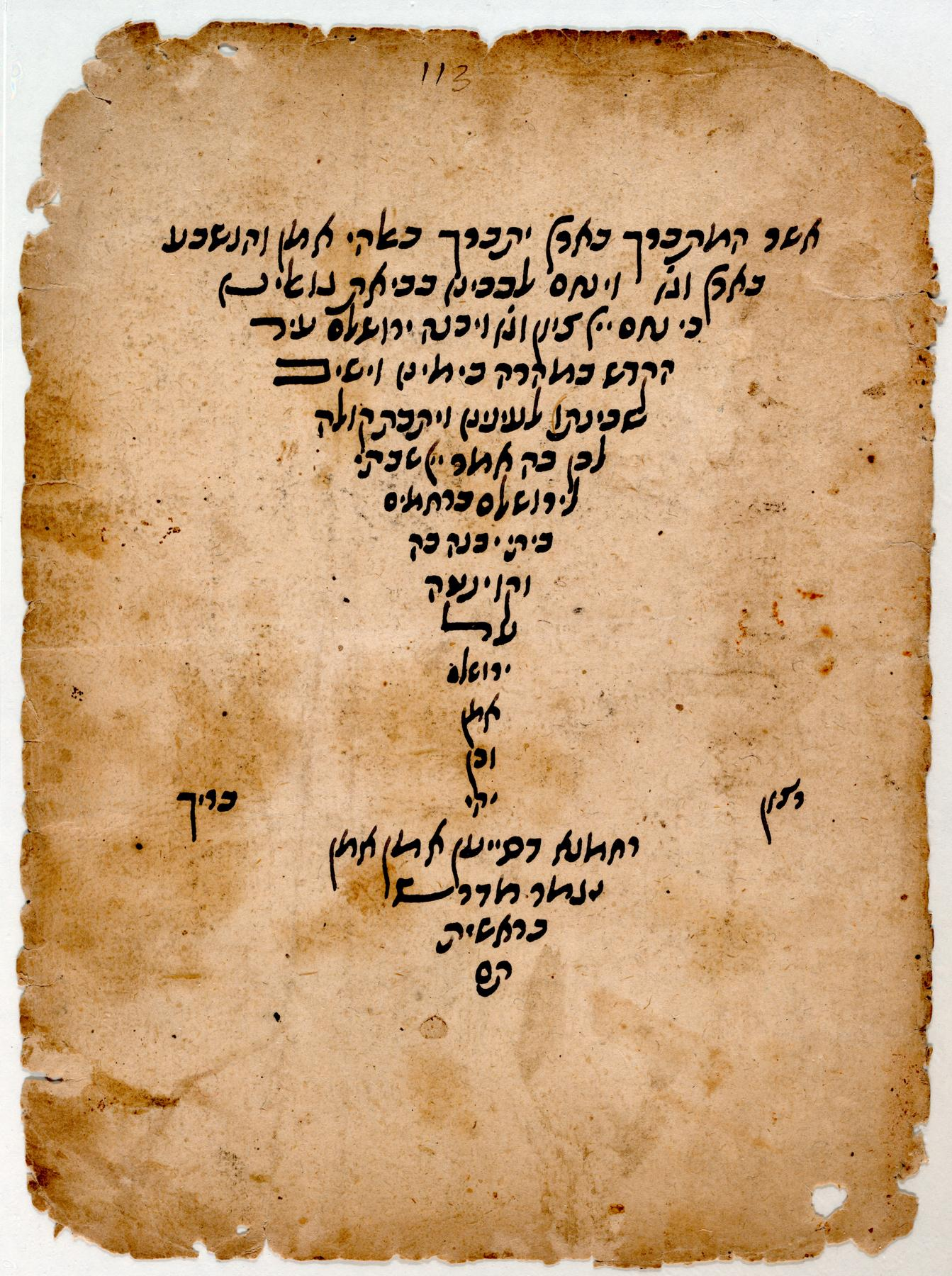
Midrash David on Genesis, colophon, Cairo Geniza, David ben Abraham Maimuni (ha-Nagid), 12th or 13th c., Katz Center/UPenn

...the secularization of Jewish history is a break with the past, [and] the historicizing of Judaism itself has been an equally significant departure... Only in the modern era do we really find, for the first time, a Jewish historiography divorced from Jewish collective memory and, in crucial respects, thoroughly at odds with it. To a large extent, of course, this reflects a universal and ever-growing modern dichotomy... Intrinsically, modern Jewish historiography cannot replace an eroded group memory which, as we have seen throughout, never depended on historians in the first place. The collective memories of the Jewish people were a function of the shared faith, cohesiveness, and will of the group itself, transmitting and recreating its past through an entire complex of interlocking social and religious institutions that functioned organically to achieve this. The decline of Jewish collective memory in modern times is only a symptom of the unraveling of that common network of belief and praxis through whose mechanisms, some of which we have examined, the past was once made present. Therein lies the root of the malady. Ultimately Jewish memory cannot be "healed" unless the group itself finds healing, unless its wholeness is restored or rejuvenated. But for the wounds inflicted upon Jewish life by the disintegrative blows of the last two hundred years the historian seems at best a pathologist, hardly a physician.

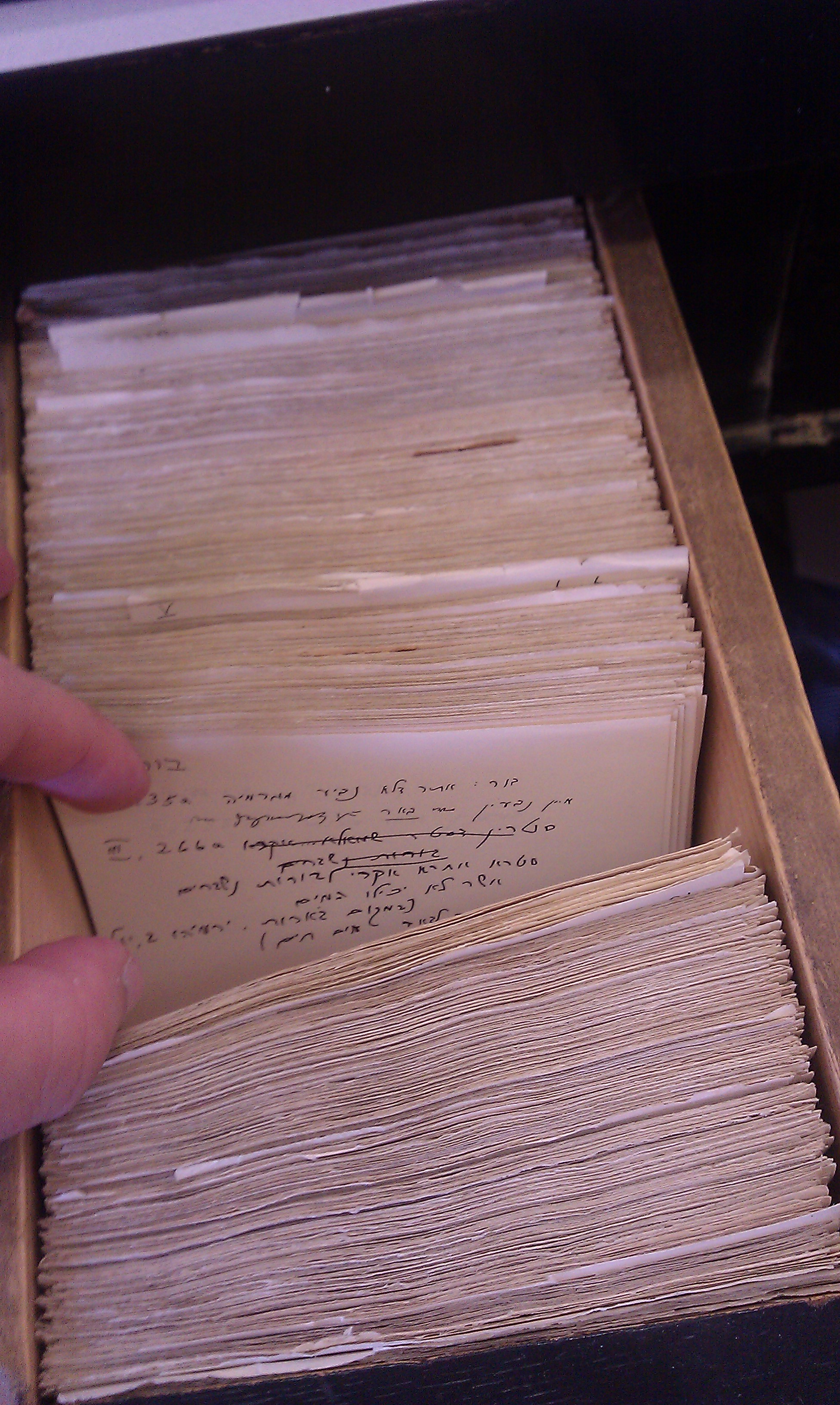
Scholem's card catalog

Some scholars such as Bonfil, Yerushalmi's students David N. Myers and Marina Rustow, and Amos Funkenstein took issue with Yerushalmi's interpretation of the importance of Jewish historiography or its relative abundance in the medieval period. In particular, Funkenstein argues that collective memory is an earlier form of historical consciousness, not a fundamental break. Rustow says that Yerushalmi's core thesis rests on a narrow definition of historiography and explores the issue of historical particularism. Gavriel D. Rosenfeld writes that Yerushalmi's fear that history would overtake memory was unfounded. Myers writes that his teacher took the criticism of his paper, which contextualized the work as a post-Shoah malaise and a postmodern authorial perspective, hard, and did not know how to respond to it, leading to estrangement that lasted years before reconnecting shortly before his professor's death.

Yerushalmi is also described by Rustow as practicing microhistory, that he did not believe in traditional methods, "heritage", "contributions", but sought a spirituality and "immanence" in his study of history. Yerushalmi was frustrated by "antiquarianism" and the anachronistic view of history. He had a complex relationship with the Jerusalem school of historians including Baer, whom he disagreed with, but was influenced by, and Scholem. He was also influenced by Lucien Febvre. Rustow, writes that Yerushalmi, like his teacher Baron, believed modernity to be a trade-off and that the role of the Church in protecting, as well as persecuting, the Jewish people of premodern Europe was "anti-lachrymose," and drew admiration from his teacher. However she writes that he agreed with Baer and Scholem that history could be only understood in Jewish terms, and disagreed with Baron's more integrationist view. Ultimately, he is criticized for accepting the sources of the Spanish Inquisition without characterizing their motive as anti-Jewish. One of Yerushalmi's major themes as expressed in the foreword to Zakhor is about a proposed return to previous modes of thinking.

=== Meyer ===
Michael A. Meyer's Ideas of Jewish History (1974) is a milestone in the study of modern Jewish histories, and Meyer's ideas were developed further by Ismar Schorsch's "From Text to Context" (1994). These works emphasized the transformation of Jewish historical understanding in the modern era and are significant in summarizing the evolution of modern Jewish histories. According to Michael Brenner, these works – like Yerushalmi's before them – underlined the "break between a traditional Jewish understanding of history and its modern transformation".

=== Brenner ===
Michael Brenner's Prophets of the Past, first published in German in 2006, was described by Michael A. Meyer as "the first broadly conceived history of modern Jewish historiography". Born in Weiden in der Oberpfalz, Brenner studied under Yerushalmi at Columbia.

=== Rustow ===
Marina Rustow, a Princeton University professor and student of Yerushalmi's at Columbia, was a recipient of a MacArthur Fellowship and a Guggenheim Fellowship and specializes in medieval Egypt, particularly the Cairo Geniza. Her 2008 work has changed the scholarly view of heresy with respect to the relative community interaction with the Karaites, a divergent group from the Rabbanite sect dominant in Judaism.

== Bibliography ==
- Baron, Salo Wittmayer; Hertzberg, A.; Feldman, L.A. (1964). History and Jewish Historians: Essays and Addresses. Jewish Publication Society of America.
- Batnitzky, Leora (2011). How Judaism Became a Religion: An Introduction to Modern Jewish Thought. Princeton University Press. ISBN 978-0-691-13072-9.
- Biale, David (1994). "Modern Jewish Ideologies and the Historiography of Jewish Politics". In Frankel, Jonathan (ed.). Studies in Contemporary Jewry: X: Reshaping the Past: Jewish History and the Historians. OUP USA/Institute of Contemporary Jewry, Hebrew University of Jerusalem. ISBN 978-0-19-509355-1.
- Brenner, Michael (2006). The Same History is Not the Same Story: Jewish History and Jewish Politics (PDF). Dorit and Gerald Paul lecture. Robert and Sandra S. Borns Jewish Studies Program, Indiana University.
- Brenner, Michael (2010). Prophets of the Past: Interpreters of Jewish History. Princeton University Press. ISBN 978-1-4008-3661-1.
- Conforti, Yitzhak (2005). "Alternative voices in Zionist historiography". Journal of Modern Jewish Studies. 4 (1). Informa UK Limited: 1–12. doi:10.1080/14725880500052667. ISSN 1472-5886. S2CID 144459744.
- Conforti, Yitzhak (2012). "Zionist Awareness of the Jewish Past: Inventing Tradition or Renewing the Ethnic Past?". Studies in Ethnicity and Nationalism. 12 (1). Wiley: 155–171. doi:10.1111/j.1754-9469.2012.01155.x. ISSN 1473-8481.
- Feiner, S. (2004). Haskalah and History: The Emergence of a Modern Jewish Historical Consciousness. Littman Library Liverpool University Press Series. Littman Library of Jewish Civilization. ISBN 978-1-904113-10-2.
- Funkenstein, Amos (1993). Perceptions of Jewish History. University of California Press. ISBN 978-0-520-91219-9.
- Gareau, Paul L. (2011). "History as the Rise Of a Modern Jewish Identity". Revue de Sciences des Religions d'Ottawa // Ottawa Journal of Religion.
- Gechtman, Roni (2012-05-01). "Creating a Historical Narrative for a Spiritual Nation: Simon Dubnow and the Politics of the Jewish Past". Journal of the Canadian Historical Association. 22 (2). Consortium Erudit: 98–124. doi:10.7202/1008979ar. ISSN 1712-6274.
- Helled, Alon (2021). "The Israeli National Habitus and Historiography: The Importance of Generations and State-Building". Norbert Elias in Troubled Times. Palgrave Studies on Norbert Elias. Cham: Springer International Publishing. pp. 295–311. doi:10.1007/978-3-030-74993-4_16. ISBN 978-3-030-74992-7. ISSN 2662-3102. S2CID 238937377.
- Israel, Jonathan I. (1998). European Jewry in the Age of Mercantilism, 1550-1750 (Third ed.). The Littman Library of Jewish Civilization. ISBN 1-874774-42-0.
- מיכאל, ראובן (Reuven Michael) (1993). הכתיבה ההיסטורית היהודית: מהרנסנס עד העת החדשה (in Hebrew). מוסד ביאליק. ISBN 978-965-342-601-6.
- מיכאל, ראובן (Reuven Michael) (1983). י״מ יוסט, אבי ההיסטוריוגרופיה היהודית המודרנית (in Hebrew). הוצאת ספרים ע״ש י״ל מאגנס, האוניברסיטה העבירת. ISBN 978-965-223-450-6.
- מיכאל, ראובן (Reuven Michael) (2003). היינריך גרץ: ההיסטוריון של העם היהודי (in Hebrew). מוסד ביאליק. ISBN 978-965-342-843-0.
- Meyer, Michael A. (1974). Ideas of Jewish History. Library of Jewish studies. Behrman House. ISBN 978-0-87441-202-4.
- Meyer, Michael A. (1988). "The Emergence of Jewish Historiography: Motives and Motifs". History and Theory. 27 (4). [Wesleyan University, Wiley]: 160–175. doi:10.2307/2505001. ISSN 0018-2656. JSTOR 2505001.
- Meyer, Michael A. (2007). "New Reflections on Jewish Historiography". The Jewish Quarterly Review. 97 (4). [University of Pennsylvania Press, Center for Advanced Judaic Studies, University of Pennsylvania]: 660–672. ISSN 0021-6682. JSTOR 25470231.
- Myers, David N. (1988). "History as Ideology: The Case of Ben Zion Dinur, Zionist Historian". Modern Judaism. 8 (2). Oxford University Press: 167–193. doi:10.1093/mj/8.2.167. ISSN 0276-1114. JSTOR 1396383.
- Myers, David N.; Kaye, Alexander (2013). The Faith of Fallen Jews: Yosef Hayim Yerushalmi and the Writing of Jewish History. Tauber Institute Series for the Study of European Jewry. Brandeis University Press. ISBN 978-1-61168-487-2.
- Ram, Uri (1995). "Zionist Historiography and the Invention of Modern Jewish Nationhood: The Case of Ben Zion Dinur". History and Memory. 7 (1). Indiana University Press: 91–124. ISSN 0935-560X. JSTOR 25618681.
- Rosman, Moshe (2007). How Jewish is Jewish History?. The Littman Library of Jewish Civilization. Liverpool University Press. ISBN 978-1-909821-12-5.
- Schorsch, Ismar (1994). From Text to Context: The Turn to History in Modern Judaism. Tauber Institute for the Study of European Jewry Waltham, Mass.: The Tauber Institute for the Study of European Jewry series. Brandeis University Press. ISBN 978-0-87451-664-7.
- Schulin, Ernst [in German] (1995). 'The Most Historical of All Peoples': Nationalism and the New Construction of Jewish History in Nineteenth-century Germany (PDF). Annual Lecture - German Historical Institute London. German Historical Institute. ISBN 978-0-9521607-8-6.
- Steinschneider, Moritz (1905). Die geschichtsliteratur der Juden in druckwerken und handschriften, zusammengestellt: von Moritz Steinschneider (in German). H. Itzkowski.
- Yerushalmi, Yosef Hayim (1982). Zakhor, Jewish History and Jewish Memory. Samuel and Althea Stroum lectures in Jewish studies. University of Washington Press. ISBN 978-0-295-95939-9.
