= Gedaliah ibn Yahya ben Joseph =

Gedaliah ibn Yahya ben Joseph (Hebrew: גדליה אבן יחיא בן יוסף; c. 1515 – 1587) was a 16th-century Italian Talmudist of the prominent Yahya family chiefly known for his chronology of the Bible and Jewish history up to his own time, The Chain of Oral Tradition (Hebrew: שלשלת הקבלה, romanized: Shalsheleṯ haqabbālā).

== Biography ==
Born in Imola, Italy, the son of Joseph ibn Yahya ben David and Abigail. In his early years he studied in Ferrara, later settling down in Rovigo, where he remained until 1562 when the burning of the Talmud took place in Italy. Following this he briefly lived in Salonica, moving back to Imola in 1567. He was later expelled with other Jews by Pope Pius V, and suffering a loss of 10,000 gold pieces, he went to Pesaro, and thence to Ferrara, where he remained till 1575. During the ensuing eight years he led a wandering life, and finally settled in Alexandria, which perhaps is where he died in 1587. Another theory "indicates that Gedaliah did not die in Alexandria, Egypt, but in Alessandria, a town sixty to seventy miles northwest of Genoa, Italy, along the road to Turin."

== Shalshelet ha-Ḳabbalah ==
Ibn Yayha's 1587 chronology is of significance in Jewish historiography. The Chain of Oral Tradition, also called the Book of Yahya (Sefer Yahya), which he labored on for more than forty years. It included a justification of Aristotelian and Neoplatonic philosophy. This work is not without defects, having suffered either because of the author's itinerant mode of life or through faulty copying of the original manuscript. Its contents are as follows:

- History and genealogy of the Jews from the time of Moses until that of Moses Norzi (1587)
- Account of the heavenly bodies, Creation, the soul, magic, and evil spirits
- History of the peoples among which the Jews have dwelt, and a description of the unhappy fate of the author's coreligionists up to his time.

The Chain of Oral Tradition was published at Venice, 1587; Kraków, 1596; Amsterdam, 1697; Zolkiev, 1802, 1804; Polonnoye, 1814; and Lemberg, 1862.

Gedaliah was the alleged author of twenty-one other works, which he enumerates at the end of his Chain and which are mentioned also in Isaac ben Jacob Benjacob's Oṣar ha-Sefarim.
