= Biblical historiography =

Study of writing Biblical history

Biblical historiography is the analysis and study of, and the writing of, traditional history that evolved from ancient oral tradition and the historical epic, which concerns the texts of the Hebrew Bible and Christian Bible. It may be viewed, for example by John Miles Foley, as a form of performance with relevance to personal and community identity, containing a form of truth distinct from "factual" history.

A shift in the writing of history to a more realistic narrative is traced to the setting of the period of the Hebrew Bible judges, traditionally dated to the twelfth-century BCE, through the books of Ezra-Nehemiah and Chronicles in the 4th century BCE, picking up again during the Hasmonean period in the Book of Maccabees and the Book of Jubilees. Alexander Rofé divides biblical history-writing into a quasi-secular branch and a heraldic-prophetic or kerygmatic branch. Some such as Thomas Römer do not consider the Deuteronomistic history to be historiography per se.

Methods of analysis or deconstruction may employ or overlap with literary criticism, exegesis, or archaeology.

== Periodization ==
Periodization of biblical historiography reflects distinct organization identified in the Second Temple Period or the Hellenistic period of Jewish history.

== See also ==
- Historiography of early Christianity
- Historicity of the Bible
