= Valley of Tears (disambiguation) =

The Valley of Tears is an area in the Golan Heights which was the site of a major battle in the 1973 Yom Kippur War.

Valley of Tears or Vale of Tears may also refer to:

== Valley of Tears ==
- The Valley of Tears (Doré), a 1883 painting by Gustave Doré
- "Valley of Tears" (song), by Fats Domino, released in 1957
- Valley of Tears, a 2015 Tank album
- The Valley of Tears – The Ballads, a 2017 compilation album by British rock band Magnum
- The Valley of Tears (film), a 2012 Canadian film
- Valley of Tears (TV series), an Israeli television series that aired in 2020

== Vale of Tears ==
- Vale of tears, a Christian phrase
- Vale of Tears (novel), the Peter T. King novel
- Vale of Tears: Revisiting the Canudos Massacre
- "The Vale of Tears", an episode of Scenes from a Marriage (American miniseries)
- Emek Ha-Bakha (Vale of Tears), a Jewish chronicle by Joseph ha-Kohen, 16th-century physician, rabbi, and historian
- Emek ha-bakha (1793), an obituary in memory of Yechezkel Landau by Baruch Jeitteles

== See also ==
- A Barrel of Laughs, a Vale of Tears – 1995 book by Jules Feiffer
