= Lachrymose conception of Jewish history =

Historiographical paradigm

The lachrymose conception of Jewish history is a historiographical theory, paradigm, or narrative of Jewish history that emphasizes and focuses on the suffering and persecution of Jews. The term was coined by Austrian-born American scholar Salo Wittmayer Baron, who criticized the pessimistic approaches of historians Heinrich Graetz and Joseph ha-Kohen toward medieval history specifically. It has come to more broadly reflect attitudes toward assimilation and antisemitism within the study of Jewish history. Baron's critique has been debated within Jewish historiography, with opposition from scholars such as Yitzhak Baer. The concept remains a focal point in discussions of Jewish historical narratives, particularly in relation to Zionist historiography and diaspora studies.

== History ==
It was anticipated by 16th century Jewish historians and revived in the 19th century as part of modern Jewish historiography. The phrase was coined by Baron, who used it to refer derisively to the pessimistic historiographical trend he criticized and associated with the 19th century German scholar Heinrich Graetz and the 16th century historian Joseph ha-Kohen.

According to Adam Teller, who offers a nuanced critique of Baron, Baron gave his clearest formulation of his position in 1937 in vol. 2 of the first edition of Social And Religious History Of The Jews:

It would be a mistake... to believe that hatred was the constant keynote of Judeo-Christian relations, even in Germany or Italy. It is in the nature of historical records to transmit to posterity the memory of extraordinary events, rather than of the ordinary flow of life. A community that lived in peace for decades may have given the medieval chronicler no motive to mention it, until a sudden outbreak of popular violence, lasting a few days, attracted widespread attention. Since modern historical treatment can no longer be satisfied with the enumeration of wars and diplomatic conflicts, the history of the Jewish people among the Gentiles, even in medieval Europe, must consist of more than stories of sanguinary clashes or governmental expulsions.

In 1928, Baron published "Ghetto and Emancipation: Shall We Revise the Traditional View?" in The Menorah Journal challenging the positions of 19th century Wissenschaft des Judentums scholars Leopold Zunz and Heinrich Graetz. According to Pierre Birnbaum, who likewise raises questions about Baron's conclusions, Baron in this article describes Graetz as having propagated in the modern period the view of the 16th century historical chronicler and physician Joseph ha-Kohen, whose work The Vale of Tears lamented the sufferings and persecutions inflicted on the Jews in detail. Birnbaum sees Baron as having accused Graetz of "neglecting the socioeconomic dimension of Jewish history in favor of the psychological interpretation 'of excessive subjectivity' manifested in a 'pulsating heart which cries out over the sufferings of his people.'"

Esther Benbassa is another critic of the lachrymose conception. Yosef Hayim Yerushalmi, Baron's student, also followed him in critiquing the lachrymose view, for example arguing that the Catholic Church had protected some Jews relative to their persecution in the Inquisition, per his student Marina Rustow. David N. Myers, another one of Yerushalmi's students, also identifies the lachrymose conception with Zunz.

According to Arie Dubnov, "Baron's mode of reading Jewish history turned out to be offering a diasporic answer to the Zionist interpretation of history, traditionally associated with the 'Jerusalem school' that could not distinguish diaspora from exile and identified both with suffering and destruction."

In his 1942 essay "The Jewish Factor in Medieval Civilization", Baron wrote that his "scholarly conscience (subconsciously perhaps also his pride in the Jewish heritage) made him impatient with the eternal self-pity characteristic of Jewish historiography", while acknowledging that there were "enormous Jewish sufferings during the Middle Ages which not even the staunchest opponent of the lachrymose conception of Jewish history would wish to minimize."

Robert Bonfil mentions that Baron revised his views somewhat on Jewish historiography in the 1960s. Still, even though his own parents were killed in the Holocaust, he insisted that persecution was not fundamental to Jewish history. However, Robert Liberles, Baron's biographer, points out that he lamented the decline of the lachrymose conception in a 1960s article, reversing his normal urging and hoping that the new currents in Jewish historiography would not completely displace the old, perhaps colored by his testimony at the trial of Adolf Eichmann.

Mark L. Smith writes that Baron, like the anti-lachrymose Yiddish historians of the interwar period, recognized the tragedy of Nazism and the "foregone conclusion of final destruction", but sought to emphasize Jewish agency and avoid "martyrology", a subset of "lachrymosity" and an example of the conclusion of the "lachrymose impulse".

== Criticism ==
Baron's anti-lachrymose conception of Jewish history has been criticized by scholars such as Yitzhak Baer.

Baron's view has been criticized by Steven Fine.

Magda Teter points out that Baron's view is widely misunderstood. David Engel also was critical of Baron's anti-lachrymose view, citing the Holocaust being a black box in Jewish historiography. Engel refers to the anti-lachrymose view as "neo-Baronianism", pointing out that Baron himself was only speaking about the Middle Ages specifically, writing,

Baron's criticism of the lachrymose theory of Jewish history was applicable to a particular period in Jewish history, not to Jewish history as a whole. As a historiographical platform, moreover, it was more descriptive than prescriptive... if Baron appears today to have deviated on occasion from his own prescription to turn historiographical attention away from catastrophe and suffering and toward continuities and beneficial interactions with the surrounding society, the appearance reflects an interpretation that is inconsistent with Baron's own work. A prescription to do so in all cases is a product of his latter-day votaries, not of Baron himself.

Robert Chazan points out that Engel showed the young Baron to not be an entirely impartial historian, his 1928 work polemical, and his innovative periodization in 1937, while influential on Jewish historiography, was still Eurocentric due to Baron and his readers' milieu, and the negation of lachrymosity limited in time.

Teller also wrote critically, dealing with the Khmelnytsky massacres, as quoted in the Jewish Review of Books by Allan Arkush,

Baron, according to Teller, was "correct when he argued that violence and suffering should not be seen as the only, or even the major, moving force in Jewish history." However, in arguing "that persecution and its effects were not a part of 'normal' Jewish life, he was unable to see what significance they did have." To this dry-eyed approach, Teller wishes to offer "a nuanced corrective." He maintains that "a return, albeit in limited form, to 'the lachrymose conception' is not only justified but actually an essential tool for understanding the Jewish past."

Teller argues that the focus, even fetish he writes, on avoiding lachrymosity in Jewish history has gone out of balance, and has led to downplaying the role of hatred and violence in Jewish history. He believes Baron would agree, if alive today, that understanding Jewish daily life did not have to mean overlooking the significance of antisemitism and persecution. Birnbaum cites the Kishinev pogrom and what it represented to American Jews as a kind of refutation of Baron's view, tracing antisemitism in America to the Tree of Life shooting.

Gavin I. Langmuir is critical of Baron's view of the development of "Jewish serfdom", calling it a paradoxical concept that obscures the degradation of Jewish status in the service of his anti-lachrymose thesis.

Magda Teter writes that the phrase and concept are still misunderstood today, and that Baron and Cecil Roth did not seek to deny suffering, but sought to celebrate life and the joy of Jewish history. Quoting Baron on Jewish agency in 1963, she points out he had acknowledged the "sordid reality" of Jewish history, including how the Nazis used the Middle Ages as a kind of camouflage, and wrote, "were Jews mere objects of general historical evolution, they could not possibly have survived the successive waves of hostility throughout the ages."

== Modern use ==
Sarah Pearce has argued that Wikipedia is unduly lachrymose in its coverage of Jewish history, such as the 1066 Granada massacre.
