= Zakhor: Jewish History and Jewish Memory =

1982 book by Yosef Hayim Yerushalmi

- Author: Yosef Hayim Yerushalmi
- Publisher: University of Washington Press
- Publication date: 1982 [1989, 1996]
- Publication place: United States
- Pages: 144
- ISBN: 978-0-295-97519-1
- OCLC: 767696741

Zakhor: Jewish History and Jewish Memory is a non-fiction work of Jewish historiography first published in 1982 by the historian Yosef Hayim Yerushalmi (1932–2009), a professor of Jewish history at Columbia University. It consists of four lectures that Yerushalmi gave as part of the 1980 series of "Stroum Lectures in Jewish Studies", now known as the Samuel and Althea Stroum Lectures in Jewish Studies, at the University of Washington in Seattle. Harold Bloom wrote the foreword for the publication. The title, Zakhor, is the Hebrew word for remember. The New Yorker described the book as "one of the most influential works on Jewish history" since the 1950s.

== Contents ==
According to 2019 The New Yorker article, Yerushalmi's central argument is that modern Jewish historiography rejects the "premises that were basic to all Jewish conceptions of history in the past." "Remember" is a "command delivered many times in the Bible, and it is possible to see Judaism itself as a technology of memory, a set of practices designed to make the past present". Yerashalmi wrote that, while many Jews in the 1980s were in search of a past, "they do not want the past that is offered by the historian." These Jews, Yerushalmi adds, must turn to "literature and ideology".

Zakhor was described in a New York Times 2009 article as a "slim volume", "barely 100 pages", "whose title bore the Hebrew imperative "Remember!". At the time of its publication, 1982, Yerushalmi was the Salo Wittmayer Baron Professor of Jewish History, Culture and Society at Columbia University, a position he held from 1980 to 2008.

In Zakhor, Yerushalmi, who "briefly led a congregation in Larchmont" as an ordained rabbi, explored the Biblical and rabbinic foundations of zakhor. He discussed the difference between history and memory, and the writing of history, the Middle Ages—vessels and vehicles of Jewish memory, the 1492 expulsion of Jews from Spain, and modern dilemmas related to Jewish historiography. The Postscript is a reflection on forgetting.

According to Yerushalmi, it was only in the sixteenth century that Jewish people began to truly write their historiography, so modern Jewish historiography is a "foreign, borrowed element in Jewish culture," and its rise coincided with a "decay in Jewish memory." (Note: Yeralshalmi is undecided about Yudka, the hero in Haim Hazaz's (1898–1973) 1942 controversial short story, Ha-Derashah or "The Sermon", which is, according to Patai, the Hebrew writer's most famous. In it, the fictional Yudka, a stonemason originally from southern Russia, struggles with his new life in Palestine and, although he is not comfortable speaking in public, decides to speak about his concerns to the committee of Haganeh leaders. Yudke "strongly criticizes the accepted notions of Zionism" and the concept of Jewish history full of "massacre and futility" that was written by Gentiles, in which Jews "wallow in the tragedy of exile". Yudke calls out to "new Jews" to wipe this history—from the fall of Masada in 73 to 74 CE to the return to Zion in the 19th century—out from their consciousness like a nightmare.)

Raphael Patai says that in the conclusion of his book, Yerushalmi predicts that Jewish history—with modern Jewish historical research dating from the 1880s—will never replace Jewish memory and there will be a time when a "new consciousness will prevail that will wonder why so many of us were immersed in history."

== Reviews ==
In the December 2009 obituary entitled "Yosef H. Yerushalmi, Scholar of Jewish History", Joseph Berger described Zakhor as an "examination of the conflict between the collective stories that invigorate Judaism as a culture and the verifiable chronicle of history itself."

In his 1983 article in The American Historical Review, Raphael Patai described it as a "remarkable book that discusses the millennial tension between the age-old Jewish commandment – and tradition – of remembrance and the relatively new Jewish interest in history". Patai wrote that, Zakhor is an "ancient and important "biblical injunction", to remember. During their 2000-year-long dispersion the Jewish people were kept alive by observing Zakhor. A New York Times 1984 book review by Leon Wieseltier, the author of Nuclear War, Nuclear Peace, said that Yerushalmi was "one of the Jewish community's most important historians". Zakhor established "him as one of its most important critics. Zakhor is "historical thinking of a very high order – mature speculation based on massive scholarship." "In his 2011 New Yorker review of Yeralshalmi's only fiction, a short story entitled "Gilgul", Nathaniel Stein wrote that the book was arguably [Yerushalmi's] most famous". In it he "meditates" on the "concept of Jewish history"—"unraveling a tangle of paradoxes surrounding memory and history in Judaism".

== Awards ==
1983: National Jewish Book Award in the Jewish History category
