= Conference on Jewish Social Studies =

The Conference on Jewish Social Studies was an American educational association created to under the role of Jews in the modern world.

The conference was first conceived of in April 1933 as the Conference on Jewish Relations by Salo W. Baron and Morris Raphael Cohen. Cohen was leader of the organization until his retirement in 1941 or 1942, when Baron replaced him. Its primary goal was distributing information about modern Jewish life to counter spreading Nazi propaganda and rising antisemitism in the United States. In addition, it aimed to get a fuller picture about Jewish population, economics, and various aspects of Jewish life. The first conference meeting was held in 1936, with Albert Einstein presiding over the conference. The organization was incorporated in New York later that year.

The organization is best known for its quarterly journal Jewish Social Studies, which began regular publication in January 1939 with editing led by Cohen. In 1944, the conference created the Commission on European Jewish Cultural Reconstruction (later renamed Jewish Cultural Reconstruction Inc.), an organization which aimed to recover and distribute property of Jews which was looted by Nazis.

In 1955 the conference obtained its present title. It was active until 1988. Its journal continues and is currently published by Indiana University Press.
