= Jewish Social Studies =

Academic journal

- Discipline: Judaic studies
- Language: English

Publication details
- History: 1939–present
- Publisher: Indiana University Press
- Frequency: Quarterly

Standard abbreviations
- ISO 4: Jew. Soc. Stud.

Jewish Social Studies is a quarterly U.S. based journal.

It was established in 1939, by the Conference on Jewish Relations, later known as the Conference on Jewish Social Studies. Its editor was the American philosopher Morris Raphael Cohen. In the early 1970s, Arthur Hertzberg was editor; his motto was "we are universalists and particularists", caring for all men and caring for Jews.

The journal is currently published by Indiana University Press.

== See also ==
- Sociology of Jewry
