= The YIVO Encyclopedia of Jews in Eastern Europe =

English-language reference work

- Editor: Gershon David Hundert
- Language: English
- Subject: Eastern Europe Jewry
- Genre: Reference encyclopaedia
- Published: 2008
- Publisher: Yale University Press; Official site
- Publication place: United States
- Media type: 2 volumes and online
- Pages: 2,400
- Awards: Association of Jewish Libraries Judaica Reference Award, 2008
- ISBN: 9780300119039
- OCLC: 170203576
- LC Class: P-PXK 12-442

The YIVO Encyclopedia of Jews in Eastern Europe is a two-volume, English-language reference work on the history and culture of Eastern European Jewry, prepared by the YIVO Institute for Jewish Research and published by Yale University Press in 2008.

== Print edition ==
The encyclopedia is 2,400 pages in length, contains over 1,800 alphabetical entries written by 450 contributors, and features over 1,000 illustrations and 55 maps.

== Online edition ==
The free online version of the Encyclopedia was officially launched June 10, 2010.

== Awards and honors ==
- Choice: Current Reviews for Academic Libraries Outstanding Academic Title 2008
- Recipient of the 2009 Dartmouth Medal Honorable Mention by the American Library Association.
- Honorable Mention for the 2008 PROSE Award in the Multi-volume Reference/Humanities & Social Sciences category, from the Association of American Publishers
- Winner of the 2008 Judaica Reference Award, given by the Association of Jewish Libraries

== Editorial staff ==
Editor-in-Chief: Gershon David Hundert, McGill University
Editorial Board:

- Marion Aptroot, Heinrich Heine University, Düsseldorf
- David Assaf, Tel Aviv University
- Gershon Bacon, Bar-Ilan University
- David Engel, New York University
- Immanuel Etkes, Hebrew University of Jerusalem
- Edward Fram, Ben Gurion University of the Negev
- Michał T. Galas, Jagiellonian University
- Haim Gertner, Hebrew University
- Avraham Greenbaum, University of Haifa, Hebrew University
- Ze'ev Gries, Ben Gurion University
- Avner Holtzman, Tel Aviv University
- Jack Jacobs, John Jay College, City University of New York
- Samuel Kassow, Trinity College
- Hillel J. Kieval, Washington University in St. Louis
- Barbara Kirshenblatt-Gimblett, New York University
- Mikhail Krutikov, University of Michigan
- Dov Levin, Hebrew University
- Olga Litvak, University at Albany
- Rachel Manekin, University of Maryland, College Park
- Alice Nakhimovsky, Colgate University
- Magda Opalski, Victoria, British Columbia
- Elchanan Reiner, Tel Aviv University
- Yaakov Ro'i, Tel Aviv University
- Michael K. Silber, Hebrew University
- Mark Slobin, Wesleyan University
- Shaul Stampfer, Hebrew University
- Michael Stanislawski, Columbia University
- Michael C. Steinlauf, Gratz College
- Adam Teller, University of Haifa
- Chava Turniansky, Hebrew University
- Leon Volovici, Hebrew University
- Chava Weissler, Lehigh University
- Mordechai Zalkin, Ben Gurion University

== See also ==
- List of encyclopedias by branch of knowledge

== Bibliography ==
- The YIVO Encyclopedia of Jews in Eastern Europe, ed. Gershon D. Hundert. New Haven: Yale University Press, 2008. ISBN 978-0-300-11903-9
