= Wie lieblich sind deine Wohnungen (Schein) =

Sacred motet by Schein

- Sacred motet by Johann Hermann Schein
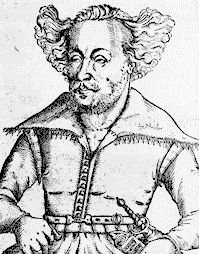
- The composer
- English: How lovely is your dwelling place
- Text: Psalms 84:2–4
- Language: German
- Composed: 1628
- Vocal: SSATB

Wie lieblich sind deine Wohnungen (How lovely are your dwelling places) is a sacred motet for four voices that Johann Hermann Schein, Thomaskantor in Leipzig, composed in 1628, setting verses 2–4 of Psalm 84 in German.

== History ==
Johann Hermann Schein was Thomaskantor in Leipzig from 1616 to 1630. He composed the motet possibly for the funeral of Maria Magdelena von Claußbruch in 1628; she was buried on 2 April that year and the sermon was given to the psalm text, verses 2–4 of Psalm 84 in Martin Luther's translation of the Bible into German. Schein set the motet for four parts, soprano, alto, tenor and bass (SATB), and basso continuo. It was published by Carus and Bärenreiter.

== Music ==
Schein set Wie lieblich sind deine Wohnungen in four beats per measure /4/2) and D minor. The beginning has declamation mostly in homophony, while later the music features faster notes and imitation. Schein used a madrigal style in the motet, depicting individual words in music. The swallow (Schwalbe) mentioned in the last line is illustrated by a leap down of an octave, and a slow rise afterward, like a swallow's "dive".

== Performances and recordings ==
When Andreas Reize conducted a choral concert of the Gabrielichor in 2017, of music of Bach's predecessors as Thomaskantor, he ranked the motet as one of three pinnacles of motets before Bach, the others being "Unser Leben ist ein Schatten" by Johann Bach, and "Tristis est anima mea" by Johann Kuhnau. In 2022, when he had become Thomaskantor himself, he programmed the motet for Deutsches Chorfest in Leipzig on 25 June 2022, and for the first tour program of the Thomanerchor after the COVID-19 pandemic, performed at locations in Thuringia and at the Lutherkirche, Wiesbaden as part of the R.
