= Psalm 84 =

- "How amiable are thy tabernacles"
- Hymn psalm · Pilgrimage psalm
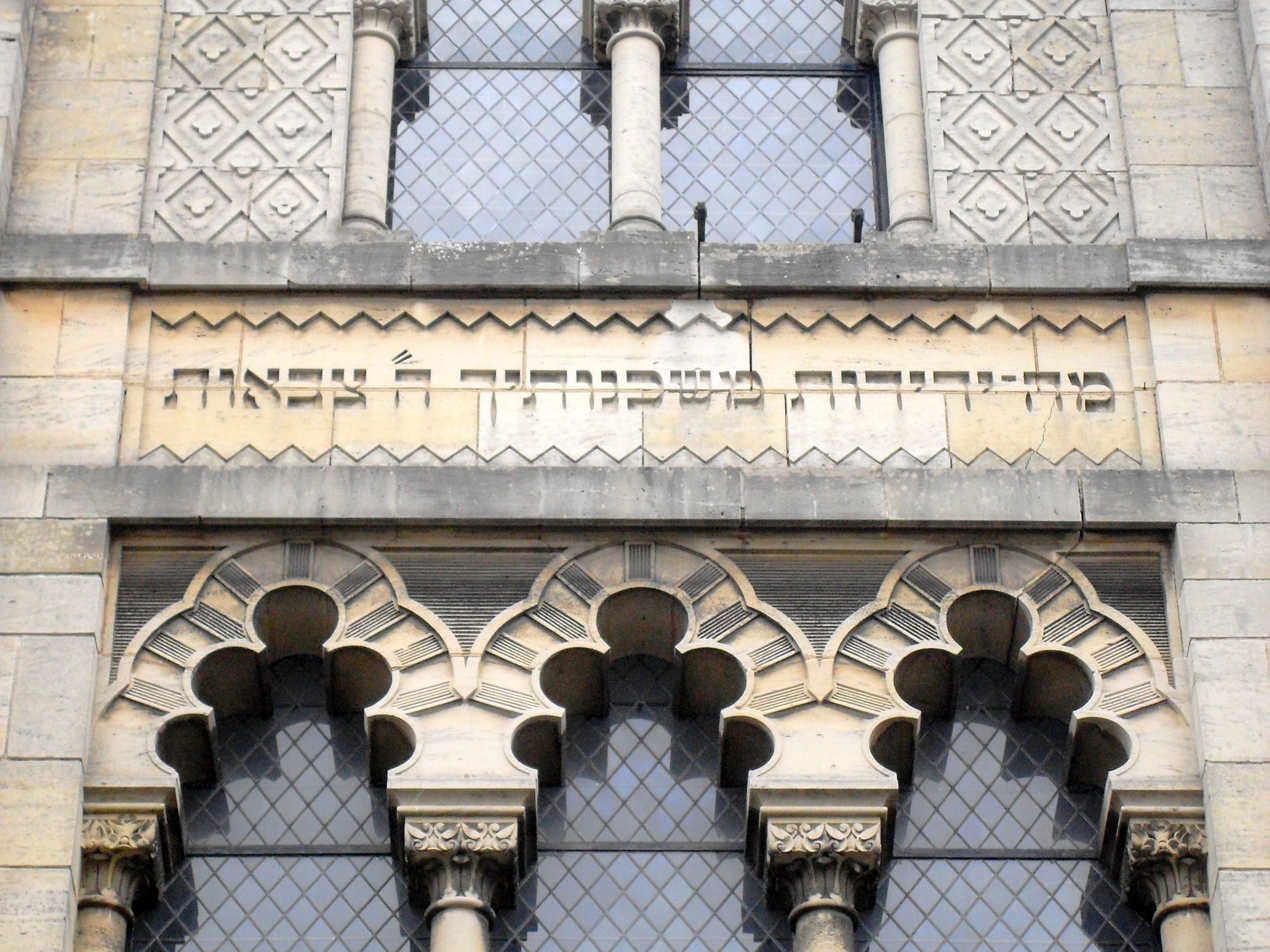
- The reference to the courts of the Lord can be seen at synagogues and churches, here at the synagogue of Châlons-en-Champagne
- Other name: "Quam dilecta tabernacula tua Domine virtutum"; "Wie lieblich sind deine Wohnungen"
- Written: 6th century BCE or earlier
- Text: by Korahites
- Language: Hebrew (original)

Psalm 84
- ← Psalm 83 Psalm 85 →
- Book: Book of Psalms
- Hebrew Bible part: Ketuvim
- Order in the Hebrew part: 1
- Category: Sifrei Emet
- Christian Bible part: Old Testament
- Order in the Christian part: 19

Psalm 84 is the 84th psalm of the Book of Psalms, beginning in the English of the King James Version: "How amiable are thy tabernacles, O Lord of hosts!". The Book of Psalms forms part of the Ketuvim section of the Hebrew Bible and part of the Old Testament of the Christian Bible. In the slightly different numbering system of the Greek Septuagint version of the bible, and in its Latin translations, the Vulgate, this psalm is Psalm 83. In Latin, the psalm is known as "Quam dilecta tabernacula tua Domine virtutum". The psalm is a hymn psalm, more specifically a pilgrimage psalm, attributed to the sons of Korah.

The psalm forms a regular part of Jewish, Catholic, Lutheran, Anglican and other Protestant liturgies. It has often been set to music, notably in Schein's motet Wie lieblich sind deine Wohnungen and by Johannes Brahms who included it in his Ein deutsches Requiem. The psalm was paraphrased in hymns. Dealing with the place where God lives, its beginning has been used as an inscription on synagogues and churches, and the psalm is sung for dedication ceremonies of buildings and their anniversaries.

== Context ==
Psalm 84 begins a group of psalms at the end of Book III within the 150 psalms, from this psalm to Psalm 89. These psalms attempt to provide hope to the exilic Israelite community, but despite their celebration of the historic traditions of the Jewish people, remind the reader that these elements no longer provide the hope they once did. Within this group, "Psalm 84 ties the presence of the divine to the temple."

Four psalms of this group, 84, 85, 87 and 88, are attributed to the Korahites, who are described as the doorkeepers of the tabernacle in the Book of Chronicles.

== Background and themes ==
The psalm could have been written before or after the exile in Babylon (6th century BCE). It is attributed to the sons of Korah, and was compiled by David into the Book of Psalms.

The psalm begins with a praise of the place where God lives, and where the singer longs to be. The psalm begins and ends addressing God as the Lord of Hosts, a divine epithet. The longing goes further than the place where God lives, yearning for the presence of the "living God". God is also identified with the sun, as "giver of life", and with a protective shield. God is called "my King and my God", the power behind life.

Originally, the desired place of God meant the Temple in Jerusalem. Some scholars believe that the psalm is written from the viewpoint of pilgrims on their way towards the temple, while others think that it dates from the time of the exile, longing to restore the destroyed temple. In Christian thinking, the place where God lives is often identified with Eternal life.

Augustine of Hippo wrote a detailed commentary. He explained, for example, that "For one day in Your courts is better than a thousand" meant one peaceful everlasting day near God is preferable to many days in the human condition. James Luther Mays comments in the book Psalms that Psalm 84 is especially beloved of all the psalms that contemplate God's dwelling, and notices that it contains three beatitudes. The Hebrew (Hebrew: עֵמֶק הַבָּכָא) (verse 6) has been translated as vale of tears or weeping and as valley of Baca.

== Uses ==
=== Judaism ===
Verse 5 of the psalm, "Fortunate are those who stay in Your house; they will continually praise You forever", is the first of two introductory verses appended to the prayer commonly known as Ashrei (Psalm 145), which is recited twice during Shacharit (morning prayer service) and once during Mincha (afternoon prayer service). The first word of this verse, Ashrei ("Fortunate"), gives its name to the whole prayer.

Verse 13, "O Lord of Hosts, fortunate is the man who trusts in You", is the second of a triad of verses recited in the Vehu Rachum prayer in Pesukei dezimra, in Uva letzion, and at the beginning of Maariv (evening prayer service). Verse 13 is also one of the verses of salvation and hope recited at the beginning of the Havdalah ceremony.

=== Catholicism ===
The psalm is part of the Catholic rite of dedication of churches and altars.

=== Coptic Orthodoxy ===
In the Agpeya, the Coptic Church's book of hours, this psalm is prayed in the office of Sext.

=== Protestantism ===
As in Catholicism, Psalm 84 was recommended for ceremonies to dedicate churches. The psalm has also been used for anniversaries of the dedication of churches, such as the 50th Kirchweihfest of the rebuilt Luisenkirche in Berlin-Charlottenburg, and the commemoration of 500 years Reformation in Munich. It is often the subject of sermons at such occasions, as by Jürgen Seidl in a service on 7 May 2006, celebrating 125 years of the Dreikönigskirche in Frankfurt, with the performance of Bach's cantata Gott der Herr ist Sonn und Schild, BWV 79, which quotes from it.

=== Book of Common Prayer ===
In the Church of England's Book of Common Prayer, this psalm is appointed to be read on the evening of the sixteenth day of the month.

=== Historical usage ===
Thomas More wrote annotations in his Psalter for Psalm 84 while awaiting execution in the Tower of London, expressing his desire to be able to take part in Christian worship again.

During the Putten raid in October 1944, the Nazi occupiers of the Netherlands attacked the village of Putten and took nearly all of its male population to concentration camps, from which only a few returned alive. When deported, the village men sang Psalm 84. In an annual commemoration at the location every October since the war, a choir sings verses of the psalm.

On April 30, 1956, Senator Alben W. Barkley gave the keynote address at the Washington and Lee Mock Convention. Barkley spoke of his willingness, when returning to the Senate, to sit with the other freshman senators, though in his earlier Congressional career he had been a senior Senator and Majority Leader for many years. He ended with an allusion to Psalm 84:10, saying "I'm glad to sit on the back row, for I would rather be a servant in the House of the Lord than to sit in the seats of the mighty." He then collapsed onstage and died of a heart attack.

== Musical settings ==
Psalm 84
Psalm 84, sung to a chant by Hubert Parry by the choir of Trinity Church, Boston

Johann Hermann Schein composed a motet, using the beginning verses of Psalm 84 in the German translation by Martin Luther, Wie lieblich sind deine Wohnungen, in 1628. Heinrich Schütz set the psalm in German as part of his Op. 2, Psalmen Davids sampt etlichen Moteten und Concerten (Psalms of David with several motets and concertos). Henry Dumont, one setting in 1652, Michel-Richard Delalande, one setting S.12 (before 1683), Marc-Antoine Charpentier, 2 settings, Quam dilecta: Psalmus David octogésimus tertius, H.167, for soloists, double chorus, flutes, strings and continuo (1675) and H.186, for 3 voices, 2 treble instruments and continuo (1680), one setting, Charles-Hubert Gervais (1723), André Campra (1725), Jean-Philippe Rameau (1722 ?), François Giroust (1779). Johann Sebastian Bach set verse 11 as the opening movement of his cantata Gott der Herr ist Sonn und Schild, BWV 79, written for Reformation Day 1725. Johann Justus Kahle set the psalm as one of four Psalm Cantatas for soprano, two oboes, two violins and continuo, for the dedication of the church in Ostrau.

Johannes Brahms included verses 1, 2 and 4 in German, "Wie lieblich sind deine Wohnungen" (How lovely are thy dwellings), as the fourth and central movement of his German Requiem, Ein deutsches Requiem, Op. 45. * Friedrich Kiel set the first 2 verses as No. 3 of his Six Motets, Op. 82, published in 1883.

Alexis de Castillon set a Paraphrase du Psaume 84 (Paraphrase of Psalm 84) by Louis Gallet for soloists, choir and orchestra as his Op. 17.

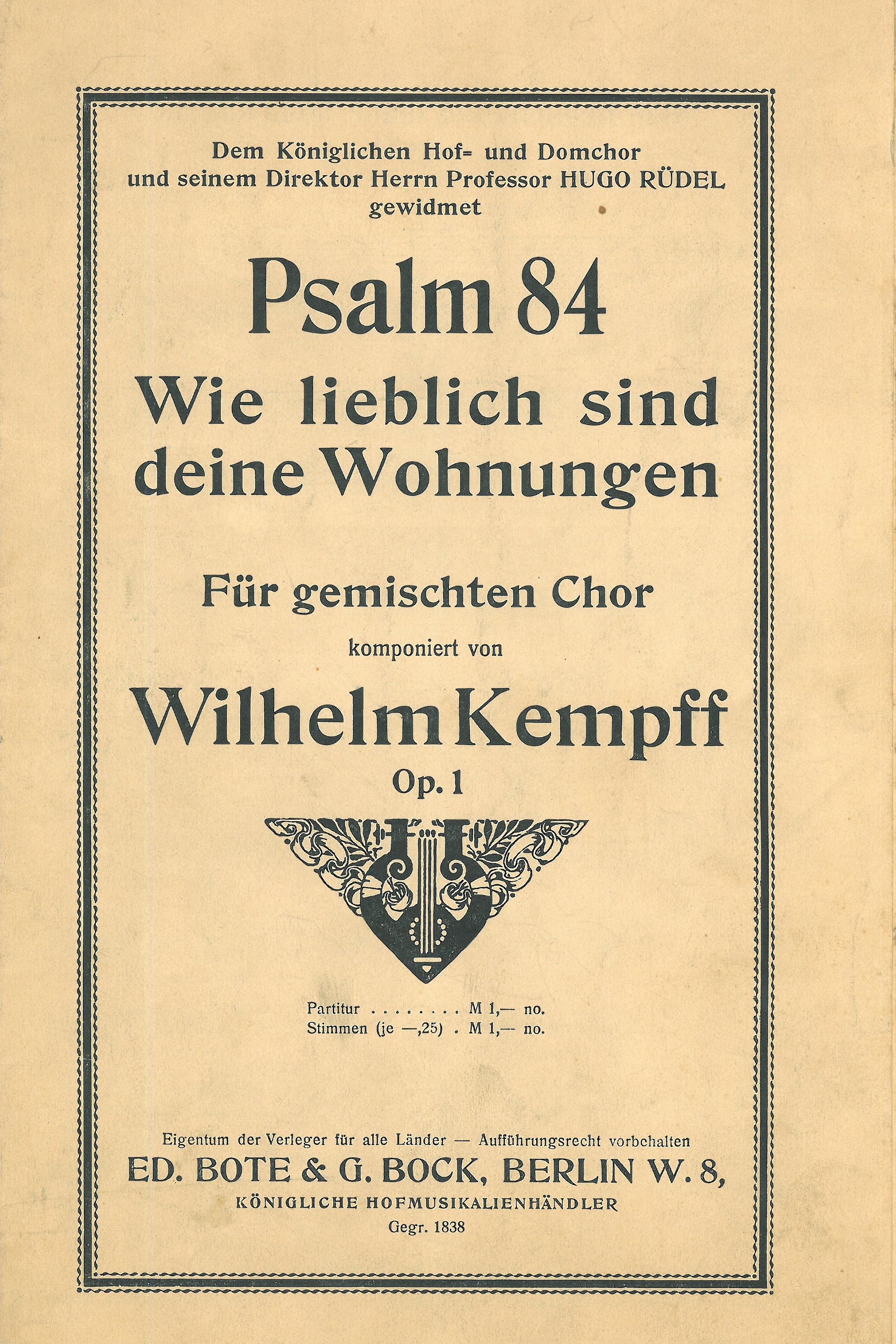
Cover of Wilhelm Kempff's setting

In 1913, Wilhelm Kempff composed a setting for choir a cappella for the cathedral choir in Berlin as his Op. 1. Katherine Kennicott Davis, the composer of the Christmas carol "The Little Drummer Boy", set verses 1–3 (How Lovely Are Thy Dwellings) for voice and piano or organ in 1952.

Several songs and hymns are based on Psalm 84 or contain part of it, for example the Dutch "Wat hou ik van uw huis" from Psalmen voor Nu. Matthias Jorissen wrote in 1798 a versed paraphrase for the Genfer Psalter, "Wie lieblich schön, Herr Zebaoth, ist deine Wohnung, o mein Gott", which appears in the Protestant hymnal Evangelisches Gesangbuch as EG 282. In 1834, Henry Francis Lyte wrote a hymn "Pleasant are thy courts above", a paraphrase of the psalm in four stanzas. Popular at the beginning of the 20th century, it is not very frequent in modern population. John Milton, the author of Paradise Lost, wrote a hymn in condensed form of four short stanzas, "How lovely are Thy dwellings fair!". Another hymn by Isaac Watts, first published in 1719, paraphrases the Psalm, beginning with "Lord of the worlds above". It was later re-published in collections such as Hymns Ancient and Modern.

Modern settings include "and the swallow" by Caroline Shaw, and "Better is One Day" by Matt Redman, which is based on verse 10. Philip Moore's anthem Lo! God is here! combines verses from Psalm 84 with John Wesley's translation of a hymn by Gerhard Tersteegen.

== Text ==
The following table shows the Hebrew text of the Psalm with vowels, alongside the Koine Greek text in the Septuagint and the English translation from the King James Version. Note that the meaning can slightly differ between these versions, as the Septuagint and the Masoretic Text come from different textual traditions. (Note: A 1917 translation directly from Hebrew to English by the Jewish Publication Society can be found here or here, and an 1844 translation directly from the Septuagint by L. C. L. Brenton can be found here. Both translations are in the public domain.) In the Septuagint, this psalm is numbered Psalm 83.

#	Hebrew	English	Greek
(Note: In the Jewish verse numbering, the ascription of this psalm is verse 1, and the rest of the psalm begins from verse 2. However, the Christian verse numbering does not count the ascription.)	לַמְנַצֵּ֥חַ עַֽל־הַגִּתִּ֑ית לִבְנֵי־קֹ֥רַח מִזְמֽוֹר׃	(To the chief Musician upon Gittith, A Psalm for the sons of Korah.)	Εἰς τὸ τέλος, ὑπὲρ τῶν ληνῶν· τοῖς υἱοῖς Κορὲ ψαλμός. -
1	מַה־יְּדִיד֥וֹת מִשְׁכְּנוֹתֶ֗יךָ יְהֹוָ֥ה צְבָאֽוֹת׃	How amiable are thy tabernacles, O Lord of hosts!	ΩΣ ΑΓΑΠΗΤΑ τὰ σκηνώματά σου, Κύριε τῶν δυνάμεων.
2	נִכְסְפָ֬ה וְגַם־כָּֽלְתָ֨ה ׀ נַפְשִׁי֮ לְחַצְר֢וֹת יְ֫הֹוָ֥ה לִבִּ֥י וּבְשָׂרִ֑י יְ֝רַנְּנ֗וּ אֶ֣ל אֵֽל־חָֽי׃	My soul longeth, yea, even fainteth for the courts of the Lord: my heart and my flesh crieth out for the living God.	ἐπιποθεῖ καὶ ἐκλείπει ἡ ψυχή μου εἰς τὰς αὐλὰς τοῦ Κυρίου, ἡ καρδία μου καὶ ἡ σάρξ μου ἠγαλλιάσαντο ἐπὶ Θεὸν ζῶντα.
3	גַּם־צִפּ֨וֹר מָ֪צְאָה בַ֡יִת וּדְר֤וֹר ׀ קֵ֥ן לָהּ֮ אֲשֶׁר־שָׁ֢תָה אֶפְרֹ֫חֶ֥יהָ אֶֽת־מִ֭זְבְּחוֹתֶיךָ יְהֹוָ֣ה צְבָא֑וֹת מַ֝לְכִּ֗י וֵאלֹהָֽי׃	Yea, the sparrow hath found a house, and the swallow a nest for herself, where she may lay her young, even thine altars, O Lord of hosts, my King, and my God.	καὶ γὰρ στρουθίον εὗρεν ἑαυτῷ οἰκίαν καὶ τρυγὼν νοσσιὰν ἑαυτῇ, οὗ θήσει τὰ νοσσία ἑαυτῆς, τὰ θυσιαστήριά σου, Κύριε τῶν δυνάμεων, ὁ Βασιλεύς μου καὶ ὁ Θεός μου.
4	אַ֭שְׁרֵי יוֹשְׁבֵ֣י בֵיתֶ֑ךָ ע֝֗וֹד יְֽהַלְל֥וּךָ סֶּֽלָה׃	Blessed are they that dwell in thy house: they will be still praising thee. Selah.	μακάριοι οἱ κατοικοῦντες ἐν τῷ οἴκῳ σου, εἰς τοὺς αἰῶνας τῶν αἰώνων αἰνέσουσί σε. (διάψαλμα).
5	אַשְׁרֵ֣י אָ֭דָם עֽוֹז־ל֥וֹ בָ֑ךְ מְ֝סִלּ֗וֹת בִּלְבָבָֽם׃	Blessed is the man whose strength is in thee; in whose heart are the ways of them.	μακάριος ἀνήρ, ᾧ ἐστιν ἡ ἀντίληψις αὐτοῦ παρὰ σοί· ἀναβάσεις ἐν τῇ καρδίᾳ αὐτοῦ διέθετο
6	עֹבְרֵ֤י ׀ בְּעֵ֣מֶק הַ֭בָּכָא מַעְיָ֣ן יְשִׁית֑וּהוּ גַּם־בְּ֝רָכ֗וֹת יַעְטֶ֥ה מוֹרֶֽה׃	Who passing through the valley of Baca make it a well; the rain also filleth the pools.	εἰς τὴν κοιλάδα τοῦ κλαυθμῶνος, εἰς τὸν τόπον, ὃν ἔθετο· καὶ γὰρ εὐλογίας δώσει ὁ νομοθετῶν.
7	יֵ֭לְכוּ מֵחַ֣יִל אֶל־חָ֑יִל יֵרָאֶ֖ה אֶל־אֱלֹהִ֣ים בְּצִיּֽוֹן׃	They go from strength to strength, every one of them in Zion appeareth before God.	πορεύσονται ἐκ δυνάμεως εἰς δύναμιν, ὀφθήσεται ὁ Θεὸς τῶν θεῶν ἐν Σιών.
8	יְ֘הֹוָ֤ה אֱלֹהִ֣ים צְ֭בָאוֹת שִׁמְעָ֣ה תְפִלָּתִ֑י הַאֲזִ֨ינָה אֱלֹהֵ֖י יַעֲקֹ֣ב סֶֽלָה׃	O Lord God of hosts, hear my prayer: give ear, O God of Jacob. Selah.	Κύριε ὁ Θεὸς τῶν δυνάμεων, εἰσάκουσον τῆς προσευχῆς μου, ἐνώτισαι, ὁ Θεὸς ᾿Ιακώβ. (διάψαλμα).
9	מָ֭גִנֵּנוּ רְאֵ֣ה אֱלֹהִ֑ים וְ֝הַבֵּ֗ט פְּנֵ֣י מְשִׁיחֶֽךָ׃	Behold, O God our shield, and look upon the face of thine anointed.	ὑπερασπιστὰ ἡμῶν, ἴδε, ὁ Θεός, καὶ ἐπίβλεψον εἰς τὸ πρόσωπον τοῦ χριστοῦ σου.
10	כִּ֤י טֽוֹב־י֥וֹם בַּחֲצֵרֶ֗יךָ מֵ֫אָ֥לֶף בָּחַ֗רְתִּי הִ֭סְתּוֹפֵף בְּבֵ֣ית אֱלֹהַ֑י מִ֝דּ֗וּר בְּאׇהֳלֵי־רֶֽשַׁע׃	For a day in thy courts is better than a thousand. I had rather be a doorkeeper in the house of my God, than to dwell in the tents of wickedness.	ὅτι κρείσσων ἡμέρα μία ἐν ταῖς αὐλαῖς σου ὑπὲρ χιλιάδας· ἐξελεξάμην παραρριπτεῖσθαι ἐν τῷ οἴκῳ τοῦ Θεοῦ μου μᾶλλον ἢ οἰκεῖν με ἐν σκηνώμασιν ἁμαρτωλῶν.
11	כִּ֤י שֶׁ֨מֶשׁ ׀ וּמָגֵן֮ יְהֹוָ֢ה אֱלֹ֫הִ֥ים חֵ֣ן וְ֭כָבוֹד יִתֵּ֣ן יְהֹוָ֑ה לֹ֥א יִמְנַע־ט֝֗וֹב לַֽהֹלְכִ֥ים בְּתָמִֽים׃	For the Lord God is a sun and shield: the Lord will give grace and glory: no good thing will he withhold from them that walk uprightly.	ὅτι ἔλεος καὶ ἀλήθειαν ἀγαπᾷ Κύριος ὁ Θεός, χάριν καὶ δόξαν δώσει· Κύριος οὐ στερήσει τὰ ἀγαθὰ τοῖς πορευομένοις ἐν ἀκακίᾳ.
12	יְהֹוָ֥ה צְבָא֑וֹת אַֽשְׁרֵ֥י אָ֝דָ֗ם בֹּטֵ֥חַ בָּֽךְ׃	O Lord of hosts, blessed is the man that trusteth in thee.	Κύριε, ὁ Θεὸς τῶν δυνάμεων, μακάριος ἄνθρωπος ὁ ἐλπίζων ἐπὶ σέ.

== Notes and references ==
Notes

=== Cited sources ===
- Augustine of Hippo (January 2000). Exposition on Psalm 84. Westminster John Knox Press. ISBN 978-0-66-425557-2 – via newadvent.org.
- Berger, Teresa (2013). Gender Differences and the Making of Liturgical History: Lifting a Veil on Liturgy's Past. Ashgate Publishing, Ltd. p. 147. ISBN 978-1-40-948149-2.
- Bullock, C. Hassell (2004). Encountering the Book of Psalms: A Literary and Theological Introduction. Baker Academic. pp. 74–77. ISBN 978-0-80-102795-6.
- Dellal, Pamela. "BWV 79 – Gott der Herr ist Sonn und Schild". Emmanuel Music. Archived from the original on 12 May 2008.
- Dunn, James D. G.; Rogerson, John William (2003). Eerdmans Commentary on the Bible. Wm. B. Eerdmans Publishing. p. 16. ISBN 978-0-80-283711-0.
- Evans, G. R. (2000). A History of Pastoral Care. A&C Black. p. 16. ISBN 978-0-22-566840-7.
- Gradofsky, Noah (2009). "Basic Judaism Course" (PDF). templeisraeloflb.org. p. 190.
- Huber, Wolfgang (2003). "Gottesdienst zum 50. Kirchweihfest der neuen Luisenkirche in Berlin-Charlottenburg (Psalm 84, 2-13)". ekd.de (in German).
- Isaiasz, Vera (2007). Stadt und Religion in der frühen Neuzeit: soziale Ordnungen und ihre Repräsentationen (in German). Campus Verlag. pp. 133–134. ISBN 978-3593384368.
- Koster, Jan (7 October 2014). "Psalm 84, jaarlijks bij de herdenking te Putten". genemuidenactueel.nl (in Dutch).
- Mays, James Luther (1994). "Psalm 84: How lovely Your Dwelling Place". Psalms. Westminster John Knox Press. pp. 274–280. ISBN 978-0-66-423747-9.
- Mazor, Lea (2011). "Book of Psalms". In Berlin, Adele; Grossman, Maxine (eds.). The Oxford Dictionary of the Jewish Religion. Oxford University Press. ISBN 978-0-19-973004-9.
- Pankhurst, Jennifer (2018). "The Conventions of Biblical Poetry". myjewishlearning.com.
- Seidl, Jürgen (2006). "Predigt zu Psalm 84". archiv.dreikoenigsgemeinde.de (in German).
- Trube, Ben (2012). "Scripture in Music (Part 1) – Psalm 84 "How Lovely Is Thy Dwelling Place"". bentrubewriter.com.
- Wallace, Robert E. (2011). "The Narrative Effect of Psalms 84–89". Journal of Hebrew Scriptures. 11: 1–15. doi:10.5508/jhs.2011.v11.a10.
- Warszawski, Jean-Marc (2005). "Castillon Marie-Alexis de Saint-Victor / (Alexis de Castillon) / 1838-1873". musicologie.org (in French).
- "Hymns for Psalm 84". ArkivMusic. Archived from the original on 5 April 2018.
- "282:0 Wie lieblich schön, Herr Zebaoth – Psalm 84 (Ö)". l4a.org.
- The Boston Composers Project: A Bibliography of Contemporary Music. MIT Press. 1983. p. 128. ISBN 978-0-26-202198-2.
- "Werke von "Matthias Jorissen" (1739–1823)". deutscheslied.com (in German).
- "Wilhelm Kempff (1895–1991) / Werke sortiert nach Musikgattung". klassika.info (in German).
- "500 Jahre Reformation: Münchens erstes protestantisches Gotteshaus". muenchen-evangelisch.de (in German). 2017.
- "Razzia 1944". Putten (in Dutch). 2020.
