= Johann Justus Kahle =

Johann Justus Kahle (11 February 1668 in Helmstedt – c. 1731 in Clausthal-Zellerfeld) was a German organist and composer.

== Life ==
He was born, son of the baker Bathold Kahle, on 11 February 1668, and christened on 12 April 1668 in the church St. Stephani. Nothing is known of his childhood; and his name cannot be found in the records of the Academia Julia. He was first organist at St. Stephani, then he moved to be organist at Zellerfeld.

He is known today only through the discovery in the library in Ostrau of Hans-Hasso von Veltheim of his church consecration cantatas which he composed on behalf of Otto Ludwig von Veltheim (1672 - 1714) around 1704.

== Works ==
Four Psalm Cantatas for soprano and instruments for dedication of St. George’s parish church in Ostrau:

- Wie lieblich sind deine Wohnungen, Herr Zebaoth (Psalm 84), cantata for soprano, 2 oboes, 2 violins and basso continuo
- Wie der Hirsch schreyet nach frischem Wasser (Psalm 42), cantata for soprano, 2 violins and basso continuo
- Ich hebe meine Augen auf zu den Bergen (Psalm 121), cantata for soprano, solo violin and basso continuo
- Jauchzet dem Herrn, alle Welt (Psalm 100), cantata for soprano, 2 oboes, 2 violins and basso continuo

== Recordings ==
- Psalm 84 "Wie lieblich sind deine Wohnungen"; Psalm 42 "Wie der Hirsch schreit"; Psalm 121 "Ich hebe meine Augen auf"; Psalm 100 "Jauchzet dem Herrn alle Welt" + Joachim Pauli: Zions Trost; Der Tag ist hin, nun kömmt die Nacht. Maria Skiba, Collegio Halense, Christoph Schlütter, Querstand, DDD, 2010
