= Jewish Cultural Reconstruction, Inc. =

Organization for returning stolen Jewish cultural property after World War II

Jewish Cultural Reconstruction, Inc. was an organization established by the Conference on Jewish Relations in April 1947 to collect and distribute heirless Jewish property in the American occupied zone of Germany after World War II. The organization, originally named the Commission on European Jewish Cultural Reconstruction (alternatively Jewish Cultural Reconstruction Commission), was originally proposed in 1944 by Theodor Gaster of the Library of Congress, and one of its cofounders.

Shortly after its founding, it became the cultural arm of the Jewish Restitution Successor Organization. It distributed about 150,000 heirless items, mostly books from the Offenbach Archival Depot whose owners could not be identified, to libraries in the United States and abroad, among others to the library of the Israelitische Cultusgemeinde Zürich in Switzerland. Hannah Arendt, then managing director of the Jewish Cultural Reconstruction, Inc., handed over parts of the library of the Breslau Rabbinical Seminary in Germany which was suppressed by the Nazis in 1938. The oldest books of the Breslau collection date back to the 16th century, among them a 1595 print of Flavius Josephus' Antiquities of the Jews. Funding for the Jewish Cultural Reconstruction's operations was provided by the American Jewish Joint Distribution Committee and the Jewish Agency for Palestine. Among the leaders and officers of the organization were Salo Baron, Hannah Arendt, Leo Baeck, and Gershom Scholem. The organization ceased operations in 1952.

== Bibliography ==
- Baron, Salo (2007). "Conference on Jewish Social Studies". Encyclopaedia Judaica. Thomson Gale.
- Gaster, Theodore (January 1945). "Foundations of Jewish Cultural Reconstruction in Europe". The Journal of Educational Sociology. 18 (5): 267–270. doi:10.2307/2262716. JSTOR 2262716.
- Herman, Dana (2008). Hashavat Avedah: a history of Jewish Cultural Reconstruction, Inc (PhD thesis). Montreal: Department of History, McGill University.
- "Jewish Cultural Reconstruction, Inc", Jewish Virtual Library
- Waite, Robert G. (2002). "Returning Jewish Cultural Property: The Handling of Books Looted by the Nazis in the American Zone of Occupation, 1945 to 1952". Libraries & the Cultural Record. 37 (3): 213–228. doi:10.1353/lac.2002.0062. ISSN 1932-9555. JSTOR 2262716. S2CID 159788651.
- Shlomit Steinberg. Orphaned Art: Looted Art from the Holocaust in the Israel Museum, Exhibition Catalogue, The Israel Museum, Jerusalem, 2008
- Shlomit Steinberg."Provenance Research in Museums: Between History and Methodology", Taking Responsibility, Nazi-looted Art – A Challenge for Museums, Libraries and Archives, Magdeburg, 2009, pp. 307–319
- Shlomit Steinberg, "The Road Paved with Good Intentions: Between Berlin and Jerusalem 1945-1955", Auf der Suche nach einer verlorenen Sammlung, Das Berliner Judisches Museum (1933-1938), Exhibition Catalogue, Berlin, 2011, pp. 48–57
- Shlomit Steinberg, "The Road to recovery: From the Central Collecting Points to a Safe Haven – The J.R.S.O, Dossier". In Schriftenreihe der Kommission fur Provenienzforschurg 3, Christopher Bazil and Eva Blimlinger (eds.). Bohlau Verlag, Wien-Koln–Weimar, 2012, pp. 119–132
- Elisabeth Gallas: Kulturelles Erbe und rechtliche Anerkennung. Die JCR, Inc. nach dem Zweiten Weltkrieg, in: Jahrbuch für Antisemitismusforschung, 22. Metropol, Berlin 2013, ISBN 3863311558, pp. 35 – 56 (in German)
- Elisabeth Gallas: "Das Leichenhaus der Bücher." Kulturrestitution und jüdisches Geschichtsdenken nach 1945. Vandenhoeck & Ruprecht, Göttingen 2013 ISBN 3525369573 (in German)
- David Guedj, The Distribution of Heirless Books to Morocco by the Jewish Cultural Reconstruction, Inc., Zutot: Perspectives on Jewish Culture, 15 (2018), pp. 63–72.
