= Mortal coil =

Poetic term for the troubles of daily life

Mortal coil is a poetic term for the troubles of daily life and the strife and suffering of the world. It is used in the sense of a burden to be carried or abandoned. To "shuffle off this mortal coil" is to die, exemplified in the "To be, or not to be" soliloquy in Shakespeare's Hamlet.

== Derivation ==
Derived from 16th-century English, coil refers to tumults or troubles. Used idiomatically, the phrase means "the bustle and turmoil of this mortal life". Coil was coined repeatedly; at various times, people have used it as a verb to mean "to cull", "to thrash", "to lie in rings or spirals", "to turn", "to mound hay", and "to stir". As a noun, it has meant "a selection", "a spiral", "the breech of a gun", "a mound of hay", "a pen for hens", and "noisy disturbance, fuss, ado". It is in this last sense, which became popular in the 16th century, that Shakespeare used the word.

Mortal coil—along with the slings and arrows of outrageous fortune; to sleep, perchance to dream; and aye, there's the rub—is part of Hamlet’s famous "To be, or not to be" speech.

== Schopenhauer's speculation ==
Arthur Schopenhauer, in his Parerga and Paralipomena, which was written in German, Volume 2, § 232a, conjectured that this phrase might have been involved in a typesetter's error or a slip of the author's pen.

Should there not have been originally 'shuttled off'? This verb itself no longer exists but 'shuttle' is an implement used in weaving. Accordingly, the meaning might be: 'when we have unwound and worked off this coil of mortality.'

In this way, the length of our life is metaphorically the length of thread that is coiled on a spool, a metaphor related to the ancient Greek mythological figures of the Fates. As humans live, the thread is unwound from the coil by the shuttle of the loom of time.

However, there are no other references in the speech to thread, looms, or weaving (aside from bodkin), and the remaining content of the speech matches the usage of coil, coile, or coyle to mean turmoil.

== See also ==
- Silver cord
- Vale of tears
