= Gershon Hundert =

Canadian historian of Polish Jewish history (1946–2023)

Gershon David Hundert
- Born: 1946; Toronto, Ontario, Canada
- Died: October 27, 2023 (aged 78); Montreal, Quebec, Canada
- Occupation: Historian
- Title: Leanor Segal Professor

Academic background
- Education: Columbia University

Academic work
- Discipline: Jewish history
- Sub-discipline: Polish Jewish history
- Institutions: McGill University

Gershon David Hundert FRSC (1946 – October 27, 2023) was a Canadian historian of Early Modern Polish Jewry and Leanor Segal Professor at McGill University.

== Biography ==
Hundert received his B.A. from Jewish Theological Seminary and School of General Studies at Columbia University (1968) and M.A. from Ohio State University (1971), where he wrote a thesis on 18th-Century Hasidic Rabbi Abraham Kalisker under the supervision of Zvi Ankori (1920–2012), a specialist of Byzantine Karaites and a student of Salo Baron.

Following Ankori, Hundert returned to Columbia to pursue a doctorate degree in history. He primarily studied with Andrzej Kaminski (born 1935), political and diplomatic historian of early modern Poland–Lithuania, and completed his dissertation in 1978 titled “Security and Dependence: Perspectives on Seventeenth-century Polish-Jewish Society Gained Through a Study of Jewish Merchants in Little Poland.” He was also deeply influenced and mentored by Israel historian Jacob Goldberg (1924–2011), the pioneer scholar of Polish-Jewish relations.

In 1975, Hundert came back to Canada and taught at McGill University ever since. He was appointed lecturer (1975–1978), assistant professor (1978–1983), associate professor (1983–1992), Montreal Jewish Community Professor of Jewish Studies (1993–2002), and Leanor Segal Professor of Jewish Studies (since 2002). He has served as Department Chair of Jewish Studies twice (1984–1988 and 1998–2007). He also held visiting professorships at Harvard, Yale and the Hebrew University. He was the editor-in-chief of The YIVO Encyclopedia of Jews in Eastern Europe (2008) and an elected fellow of the Royal Society of Canada (2011- ).

Hundert was married to Ruth Mencow, daughter of World War II veteran Nathaniel Mencow. They raised one son and two daughters. He died on October 27, 2023, at the age of 78.

== Scholarly contributions ==
Succeeding Raphael Mahler and Ignacy Schiper, Hundert represents the postwar-born generation of premodern Polish Jewish historians and, along with Moshe Rosman and Ada Rapoport-Albert, establishes “a new era of the historiography of Polish Jewry.”

His first monograph, The Jews in a Polish Private Town (1992), studies social and economic history of Opatów Jewry in the eighteenth century, exemplifying Jewish autonomy and identity and their crucial commercial roles in the later period of the Commonwealth. The work also sheds new light on Polish local history and Jewish microhistory.

His more renowned second monograph, Jews in Poland–Lithuania in the Eighteenth Century (2004), is an essential revisionist work in early modern European Jewish historiography. It examines the life of the understudied, but extremely important, East Central European Jewry—world's largest Jewish community at the time, and argues for their mentalité of chosenness and their particularities on the path towards modernity.

Another achievement is the groundbreaking The YIVO Encyclopedia of Jews in Eastern Europe published in 2008. 450 leading scholars from the world have contributed to this decade-long project, of which Hundert served as the editor-in-chief. The work includes more than 1,800 entries and covers all aspects of Eastern European Jewish experiences from the Middle Ages to the late twentieth century. The searchable version of the encyclopedia was launched in 2010.

Besides, he edited an essay collection on the development of scholarship on Hasidism in 1991 and co-compiled a bibliography on Eastern European Jewish historiography in 1984.

== Awards and honours ==
- President, American Academy for Jewish Research, 2014–2018.
- Fellow, the Royal Society of Canada, Academy of the Arts and Humanities, 2011-
- The Judaica Reference Award, from Association of Jewish Libraries, for Gershon Hundert, editor-in-chief, The YIVO Encyclopedia of Jews in Eastern Europe, 2008.
- Fellow, the Institute for Advanced Studies, Hebrew University, Jerusalem, 2007–2008.
- Fellow, the American Academy for Jewish Research, 2006- .
- I. J. Segal Prize, for the best non-fiction book on a Jewish theme by a Canadian, for Jews in Poland–Lithuania in the Eighteenth Century: A Genealogy of Modernity, 2010.
- Oscar Halecki Polish and East Central European History Award, for Jews in Poland–Lithuania in the Eighteenth Century: A Genealogy of Modernity, 2005.
- Doctor of Humane Letters (honoris causa), Reconstructionist Rabbinical College, Philadelphia, PA, 2003.
- Montreal Jewish Community Professor of Jewish Studies 1994–2002.
- Fellow, Katz Center for Advanced Judaic Studies, 2002-2003, 2013-2014.
- Leanor Segal Professor of Jewish Studies, McGill University, 2002- .

== Selected publications ==
=== Books ===
- Jews in Poland–Lithuania in the Eighteenth Century: A Genealogy of Modernity. University of California Press, 2004 (Paperback, 2006). ISBN 978-0520238442 / ISBN 978-0520249943. (Also published in Russian, Hebrew, Polish and Lithuanian).
- The Jews in a Polish Private Town: The Case of Opatów in the Eighteenth Century. The Johns Hopkins University Press, 1992. ISBN 978-0801842733.
- The Jews in Poland and Russia: Bibliographical Essays (with Gershon Bacon). Indiana University Press, 1984. ISBN 978-0253331588.

=== Edited books / encyclopedia ===
- The YIVO Encyclopedia of Jews in Eastern Europe, 2 vols., Editor in Chief. New Haven and London: Yale University Press, 2008. ISBN 978-0300119039. Online edition launched in 2010.
- Jews in Early Modern Poland. [Polin, Volume 10] Oxford: The Littman Library of Jewish Civilization in association with Vallentine Mitchell, 1997. ISBN 978-1874774310.
- Jews, Poles, Socialists: The Failure of an Ideal. [Polin, Volume 9] (edited with Antony Polonsky, Israel Bartal, Magdalena Opalski and Jerzy Tomaszewski). Oxford: The Littman Library of Jewish Civilization in association with Vallentine Mitchell, 1996. ISBN 9781874774211.
- Essential Papers on Hasidism: Origins to Present. New York University Press, 1991. ISBN 978-0814734704.
- Community and the Individual Jew: Essays in Honor of Lavy M. Becker. (edited with Ronald S. Aigen). Montreal, Reconstructionist Rabbinical College Press, 1986. ISBN 978-0938945000.
