= Joseph ha-Kohen =

16th-century physician, rabbi, and historian

- Born: December 20, 1496; Avignon
- Died: between 1575 and 1580 (aged between 79 and 84); Genoa
- Occupations: physician, historian, philologist

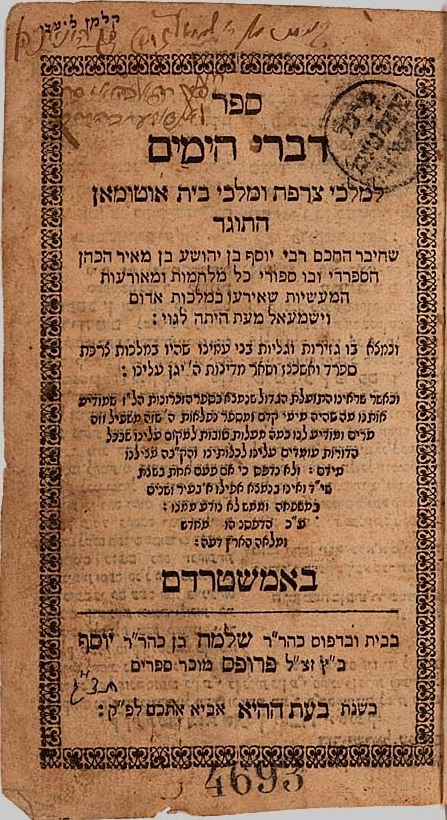
Divrei ha-Yamim. Amsterdam, 1733.

Joseph ben Joshua ben Meïr ha-Kohen (1496–1575/80) was a Jewish physician, historian and Renaissance scholar.

== Life ==
Joseph's paternal family originally lived at Cuenca, Castile. His mother, Dolca, originated from Aragon. When the Jews were expelled from Spain the family settled at Avignon, where Joseph was born. At the age of five Joseph left Avignon with his parents and went to Genoa, where they remained until 1516. Driven from that city, they went to Novi, but returned to Genoa in 1538, where Joseph practiced medicine for twelve years. On June 3, 1550, he and all his coreligionists were driven from Genoa as a consequence of the rivalry of the non-Jewish physicians. Joseph then settled at Voltaggio, at the request of the citizens of that small town, practicing there until 1567. When the Jews were driven out of the territory of Genoa, he went to Castelletto (Montferrat), where he was very well received. In 1571 he was again established at Genoa, where he died.

Joseph ha-Kohen had three sons (Joshua, Isaac, Judah) and two daughters. As for his brother Todros, he has tentatively been identified by Robert Bonfil with Ludovico Carretto, who is known to have converted from Judaism. Joseph ha-Kohen was highly regarded as a historian and physician. One of his chief concerns was also the release of the many Jewish captives taken by the vessels of the Italian republics and by the Corsairs; as in 1532, when Andrea Doria captured many Jews on taking Coron, Patras, and Zante; in 1535, when the emperor Charles V took Tunis; in 1542, when the galleys of Visconte Cicala had imprisoned a number of Jews.

== Historical works ==
Joseph ha-Kohen is considered one of the most significant 16th century Jewish historians and Renaissance scholars. He was cited and highly regarded by later historians such as Jacques Basnage. He undoubtedly tried to be a careful historian. He gathered his facts from all possible sources, made notes, kept registers, and conducted a wide correspondence. He added continually to the first redaction of his works, carefully dating each one. Of his second chronicle he thus made at least four updated editions. Having lived in Italy from his childhood and become acquainted with persons prominent politically, he is a valuable source for the history of his time; concerning many events, he had examined witnesses. He also mentions a number of important facts ignored by other historians. He is less accurate in the treatment of ancient history, for which he often was obliged to consult untrustworthy sources.

He has two prominent works in the world of Hebrew literature. His first chronicle, Dibre ha-Yamim le-Malke Zarfat we-Beit Otoman ha-Tugar (Chronicles of the Kings of France and Ottoman the Turk), is a history of the world, in the form of annals, in which he outlines the conflict between Asia and Europe, between Islam and Christianity, the protagonist for Islam being the mighty Turkish empire, and for Christianity, France. He connects this to European history, beginning with the downfall of the Roman empire. He also includes narratives of persecutions of Jews during the first and second crusades, copied from eye-witness reports available to him in manuscript. The work was printed in 1554 at Venice but later put on index (Amnon Raz-Krakotzkin). It was reprinted in Amsterdam in 1733. Parts were translated into German and French; the entire work was issued in English, but badly translated, by Christoph Heinrich Friedrich Bialloblotzky. He continued, however, the work on it, as is evident from autographs preserved in British Library.

His second chronicle, Emek Ha-Bakha (Vale of Tears), was started in 1558 and is considered an important historical work. The name comes from Psalm 84, and it is a history of Jewish martyrdom. It consisted of the narrative of Jewish persecution that extracted from and built on the Jewish part of his earlier world histories, and inspired Salo Baron's idea of the "lachrymose" conception of Jewish history. It incorporates material from Samuel Usque's Consolaçam as Tribulaçoens de Ysrael (1557) and the chronicle of Abraham ibn Daud. Its set purpose in the introduction to the book was to serve as reading on the fast of 9 Av, a mournful holiday event in Judaism. There he dwells upon the sorrows and sufferings the Jews endured in various countries in the course of centuries. The book, which is a martyrology from beginning to end, closes with the 24th of Tammuz, 5335 AM (1575 CE). Yerushalmi notes that it begins in the post-biblical era. Bonfil notes that Joseph ha-Kohen's historiography is specifically shaped by the Jewish expulsion from Spain that Joseph ha-Kohen personally experienced. Joseph ha-Kohen and Usque are sources for early documentation of Jewish blood libels. He was a contemporary of the Italian-Jewish geographer Abraham Farissol, a scribe from Avignon who worked for Judah Messer Leon, and drew upon his work. Joseph ha-Kohen incorporates earlier medieval chronicles almost verbatim.

Joseph ha-Kohen began the first version of this work in 1558, at Voltaggio, and concluded it, in its initial form, toward the end of 1563. It was finally carried by the author down to 1575. It circulated in Italy in manuscript and was edited for the first time by Samuel David Luzzatto and published in 1852 by Max Letteris. In 1858 M. Wiener published a German translation. A modern text-critical edition, edited by Karin Almbladh, appeared in 1981.

== Other works ==
Joseph ha-Kohen wrote few other works that had not been printed. Some of them are adaptations to Hebrew of books wrriten in Latin, Spanish, and probably also Italian.

- One of them is Joan Boemus's Omnium Gentium Mores Leges et Ritus, which is a geographical- ethnographical book about the Old World, which he completed in 1557, titled Matztib Gebulot 'Ammim (Who Setteth the Boundaries of Nations), although adding some new information regarding the geographical discoveries of his time in Africa, as well as mentioning the New World as well.
- In his late version of Chronicles of the Kings of France and Turkey, there is a reference to Amerigo Vespucci's discovery of the New World, which is assumed to be an error; he later began referring to Columbus instead. Joseph ha-Kohen heard about the new discoveries and arranged that the popular book by Francisco López de Gómara,La Historia general de las Indias, would be sent to him from Spain. He adapted to Hebrew this two volume book about the history of the Spanish conquests of Mexico and Central America by Fernando Cortés and others, starting with the account of the discoveries of Columbus.
- Joseph ha-Kohen wrote also a recepies work, titled Meqitz Nirdamim. It contains Hebrew version of Meïr Alguadez's Spanish (in Hebrew letters) medical work, giving prescriptions for the healing of various diseases; to these prescriptions he added many of his own, including remedies for Syphilis.
- Another small work of a different kind was his Peles ha-Shemot, written in 1561, containing an alphabetical list of Hebrew nouns, with scripture illustrations of their occurrence given for the purpose of fixing their gender — a matter in which (as he says) "many writers in Hebrew erred." He also compiled, in 1567, a book of polite formulas to be used in addressing letters, and a large number of verses, which are found, written in his own hand, at the end of his works. A large number of letters, evidently meant to serve as models, are found in the MSS. Rabbinowicz, No. 129 (now in Budapest and edited by Abraham David in 1985). Two-thirds of these are by Joseph ha-Kohen; they give an insight into his private life.

== Bibliography ==
- Karin Almbladh (ed.) Sefer Emeq ha-Bakha: The vale of tears: with the chronicle of the anonymous Corrector /Joseph ha-Kohen; introd., critical ed., comments by Karin Almbladh, Uppsala 1981 ISBN 91-554-1143-6
- Robert Bonfil, "Chi era Ludovico Carretto, apostata?" in: Guido Nathan Zazzu (Ed.), E andammo dove il vento ci spinse. La cacciata degli ebrei dalla Spagna. (Genova: Marietti, 1992), 51-58
- Robert Bonfil (ed.), Josef ha-Cohen, Sefer Emeq Ha-Bakha (The Vale of Tears), Magnes, Jerusalem 2020 (in Hebrew).
- Abraham David (ed.). The letters of Joseph ha-Kohen: the author of Emeq ha-bakha. Jerusalem 1985.
- Martin Jacobs, Empire from the Margins: Early Modern Jewish Historians on the Spanish and Ottoman Expansion (Philadelphia: University of Pennsylvania Press, 2025) ISBN 978-1-5128-2769-9, Part II.
- Martin Jacobs, "Joseph ha-Kohen, Paolo Giovio, and Sixteenth-Century Historiography", in Cultural Intermediaries: Jewish Intellectuals in Early-Modern Italy, ed. David B. Ruderman, Giuseppe Veltri (Philadelphia: University of Pennsylvania Press, 2004), 67-85.
- Martin Jacobs, "Sephardic Migration and Cultural Transfer: The Ottoman and Spanish Expansion through a Cinquecento Jewish Lens," Journal of Early Modern History 21, no. 6 (2017): 516-542.
- Mosheh Lazar (ed.), Sefer ha-Indiʾah ha-ḥadashah; Ṿe-Sefer Fernando Ḳorṭeś, 1553 Lancaster, Calif 2002 ISBN 0-911437-96-7
- Mintz-Manor Limor, The Discourse on the New World in the Early Modern Jewish Culture (Hebrew with English abstract),Thesis (Ph.D.) Hebrew University of Jerusalem, 2011
- Ana María Riaño López El manuscrito de Ha-Kohén. Granada, 2002. ISBN 84-89739-43-9
- Pilar Leon Tello (trans.) ʻEmeq ha-bakha de Yosef ha-Kohen: estudio preliminar, trad. y notas par Pilar Leon Tello Madrid 1964
- Amnon Raz-Krakotzkin, The censor, the editor, and the text: the Catholic Church and the shaping of the Jewish canon in the sixteenth century. University of Pennsylvania Press, 2007 ISBN 0-8122-4011-1, ISBN 978-0-8122-4011-5
