= Robert M. Levine =

American historian

Robert M. Levine (1941 – April 1, 2003) was an American historian, Gabelli Senior Scholar in the Arts and Sciences, Director of Latin American Studies, and professor of history at the University of Miami.

His interests were related to Latin America, in particular, Brazilian cultural and political history, Jewish diasporas in Latin America, Cuban history, and Latin American history in general.

== Biography ==
Robert M. Levine was born to David and Ruth Levine and grew up in New York City. After graduating with High Honors from Colgate University, he obtained his Ph.D. from Princeton University.

Levine died of cancer, leaving behind his two sons, Joey and David.

== Books ==
- 1970: The Vargas Regime: The Critical Years, 1934-1938 (from Ph.D. thesis)
- 1980: Portuguese translation: O regime de Vargas, nonfiction best-seller for 12 weeks
- 1995: Vale of Tears: Revisiting the Canudos Massacre in Northeastern Brazil
- 1989: Images of History: Nineteenth and Early Twentieth Century Latin American Photographs as Documents
- 1990: Cuba in the 1850s: Through the Lens of Charles DeForest Fredricks
- 1994: Tropical Diaspora: the Jewish Experience in Cuba, 1902-1992
- 1994: (with Jose Carlos Sebe) Cinderela Negra: A Saga de Carolina Maria de Jesus
- 1995: (with Jose Carlos Sebe) The Life and Death of Carolina Maria de Jesus
- 1997: Brazilian Legacies
- 1998: Father of the Poor? Vargas and His Era. New York: Cambridge University Press,1998. ISBN 9780521585286
- 1999:The History of Brazil (nonacademic; for general audience)
- 2000: (with Moises Asis) Cuban Miami. New Brunswick, NJ: Rutgers Univ. Press, 2000. ISBN 0-8135-2780-5
- 2001: Secret Missions to Cuba: Fidel Castro, Bernardo Benes, and Cuban Miami
- Cambridge Concise History of Cuba, left as manuscript; posthumously revisited by prof. Frank Mora
