= Father of the Poor? Vargas and His Era =

1998 book by Robert M. Levine

Father of the Poor?: Vargas and His Era
- Author: Robert M. Levine
- Language: English
- Genre: Non-fiction
- Published: 1998
- Publisher: Cambridge University Press
- Publication place: United Kingdom
- Media type: Print (hardback & paperback)
- ISBN: 978-0-521-58515-6

Father of the Poor?: Vargas and His Era is a book by historian Robert M. Levine published by Cambridge University Press in 1998. The author writes about the Vargas Era of Brazilian history with a focus on Vargas' life, his political history, Brazilian political atmosphere and a critique of the Revolution being “incomplete.” Vargas’s daughter, Alzira, is also credited with helping provide information to Levine for the content of the book.

== Synopsis ==
The book covers the origins of Vargas, including his family history, until his death in 1954. It also includes how society and various political actors felt about the “Estado Novo” period including the accounts on the Integralists and Communists. The detailed history provided in the first four chapters that primarily refer to Vargas and his policies. Vargas’s policies included but not limited to, worker empowerment programs, political reforms, that often involve censorship, and giving women the right to vote in 1937. The Vargas dictatorship according to Robert M Levine, had "populist" elements in addition to being very totalitarian. Vargas promoted a nationalist economic policy with his dictatorship. These economic reforms aided in industrializing Brazil and provided clarity to the working class. Workers received education, health, and dental care for the first time. The censorship of political parties played a role in characterizing the Vargas Period. Vargas' former political allies, the Integralists, tried to influence Vargas policies and were perceived as a threat by the government. With the parties censored, he and his loyalist cabinet were able to accomplish many tasks and strengthened the domestic affairs of the state.

The final chapters of the book cover the legacy and a critique of the “Estado Novo” dictatorship and Vargas’ character. One of the primary observations made by Robert was the politics Vargas was in, drove him to suicide in 1954. With the threat of military coup at any point, it caused anxiety in Vargas. The army had a history of rebelling against the government and attempted to overthrow the Old Republic at various times.

Finally, the last section of the book is a detailed timeline, information on sources and a picture gallery of the Estado Novo era. The Chronology section includes dates and times that are considered important to understanding the Vargas regime until its collapse.

== Critical reception ==
Review by Peter M. Beattie in the Latin American Research Review (36) 2001: 193-201.

Review by Joel W. Wolfe in the Hispanic American Historical Review 80 (2000): 210-212.

Review by Peter Flynn in the Journal of Latin American Studies 33 (2001): 638-640.
