= Salo Baron =

Austrian-American historian (1895–1989)

Salo Wittmayer Baron
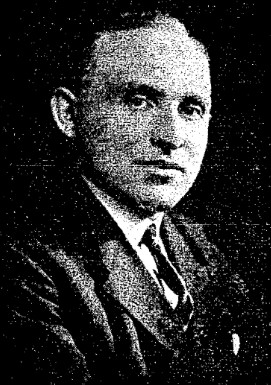
- Salo Wittmayer Baron
- Born: May 26, 1895; Tarnów, Austrian Poland
- Died: November 25, 1989 (aged 94); New York City, U.S.

Academic background
- Education: University of Vienna

Academic work
- Discipline: Jewish history
- Institutions: Columbia University

Salo Wittmayer Baron (May 26, 1895 – November 25, 1989) was a Galician-born American historian, described as "the greatest Jewish historian of the 20th century". Baron taught at Columbia University from 1930 until his retirement in 1963.

== Life ==
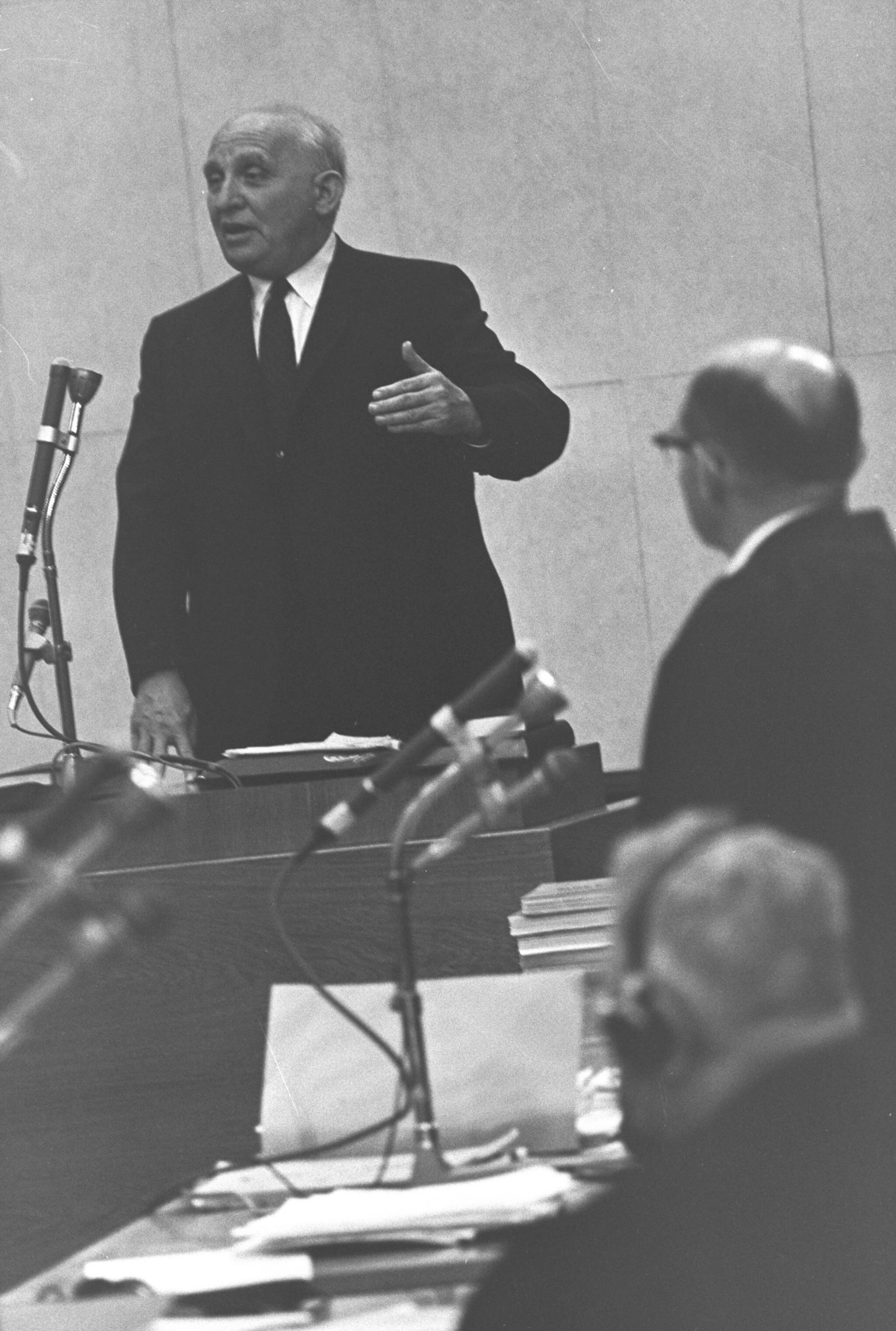
Prof. Baron testifying at Adolf Eichmann's trial

Baron was born in Tarnów, Galicia, which was then part of the Austro-Hungarian Empire but is now in Poland. Baron's family was educated and affluent, part of the Jewish aristocracy of Galicia. His father was a banker and president of the Jewish community of 16,000. Baron's first language was Polish, but he knew other languages, including Yiddish, Hebrew, French, and German, and was famous for being able to give scholarly lectures without notes in five languages.

Baron received rabbinical ordination at the Jewish Theological Seminary in Vienna in 1920, and earned three doctorates from the University of Vienna, in philosophy in 1917, in political science in 1922 and in law in 1923. He began his teaching career at the Jewish Teachers College (Jüdisches Pädagogium) in Vienna in 1926, but was persuaded to move to New York to teach at the Jewish Institute of Religion by Rabbi Stephen S. Wise in New York.

Baron's appointment as the Nathan L. Miller Professor of Jewish History, Literature and Institutions at Columbia University in 1929 is considered to mark the beginning of the teaching of the academic field of Jewish Studies in an American university.

In 1933, Jeannette Meisel, a graduate student in economics, consulted him about a dissertation she was writing. They married in 1934, and Jeannette Baron became a collaborator in his scholarly work. "He and his wife, in their heyday, were a kind of partnership," Mr. Hertzberg recalled. "She helped with every one of his books, and they signed a couple of monographs together."

After World War Two, Baron ran the Jewish Cultural Reconstruction, Inc., an organization established in 1947 to collect and distribute heirless Jewish property in the American occupied zones of Europe. Hundreds of thousands of books, archives, and ceremonial objects were distributed to libraries and museums, primarily in Israel and the United States.

On April 24, 1961, Professor Baron testified at the trial of Adolf Eichmann in Jerusalem. Baron explained the historical context of the Nazi genocide of the Jews. He further explained that in his birthplace, Tarnow, there had been 20,000 Jews before the war but, after Hitler, there were no more than 20. His parents and a sister were killed there.

In addition to his scholarly work, Baron was active in organizational efforts to maintain and strengthen the Jewish community both before and after World War II. From 1950 to 1968, he directed the Center of Israel and Jewish Studies at Columbia University. He received more than a dozen honorary degrees from universities in the United States, Europe, and Israel and was elected a Fellow of the American Academy of Arts and Sciences in 1964.

Baron died in New York City, aged 94. The Salo Wittmayer Baron Chair of Jewish History, Culture and Society at Columbia University was created in his honor, as were the U.S. Salo Wittmayer Baron Dissertation Award in Jewish Studies and The Salo Wittmayer Baron Faculty Research and Development Grant at Arizona State University.

== Scholarship ==
According to Yosef Hayim Yerushalmi, Baron "was undoubtedly the greatest Jewish historian of the 20th century." His and his wife's magnum opus was A Social and Religious History of the Jews (Columbia University Press), which began as a series of lectures, turned into a three-volume overview of Jewish history published in 1937 and finally grew into a revised version. Professor Baron continued to work on the series throughout his life.

Baron opposed the "lachrymose conception of Jewish history," sometimes identified with Heinrich Graetz, the 19th-century Jewish historian. In a 1975 interview, Baron said "Suffering is part of the destiny [of the Jews], but so is repeated joy as well as ultimate redemption." Robert Bonfil mentions that Baron revised his views somewhat on Jewish historiography in the 1960s. Still, even though his own parents were killed in the Holocaust, he insisted that persecution was not fundamental to Jewish history. However, Robert Liberles, Baron's biographer, points out that he lamented the decline of the lachrymose conception in a 1960s article, reversing his normal urging and hoping that the new currents in Jewish historiography would not completely displace the old, perhaps colored by his testimony at the trial of Adolf Eichmann. Magda Teter writes that the phrase and concept are still misunderstood today, and that Baron and Cecil Roth did not seek to deny suffering, but sought to celebrate life and the joy of Jewish history. Quoting Baron on Jewish agency in 1963, she points out he had acknowledged the "sordid reality" of Jewish history, including how the Nazis used the Middle Ages as a kind of camouflage, and wrote, "were Jews mere objects of general historical evolution, they could not possibly have survived the successive waves of hostility throughout the ages."

Magda Teter points out that Baron's view is widely misunderstood. David Engel also was critical of Baron's anti-lachrymose view, citing the Holocaust being a black box in Jewish historiography. Engel refers to the anti-lachrymose view as "neo-Baronianism," pointing out that Baron himself was only speaking about the Middle Ages specifically, writing,

Baron's criticism of the lachrymose theory of Jewish history was applicable to a particular period in Jewish history, not to Jewish history as a whole. As a historiographical platform, moreover, it was more descriptive than prescriptive... if Baron appears today to have deviated on occasion from his own prescription to turn historiographical attention away from catastrophe and suffering and toward continuities and beneficial interactions with the surrounding society, the appearance reflects an interpretation that is inconsistent with Baron's own work. A prescription to do so in all cases is a product of his latter-day votaries, not of Baron himself.

Robert Chazan points out that Engel showed the young Baron to not be an entirely impartial historian, his 1928 work polemical, and his innovative periodization in 1937, while influential on Jewish historiography, was still Eurocentric due to Baron and his readers' milieu, and the negation of lachrymosity limited in time.

Professor Baron also strove to integrate the religious dimension of Jewish history into a full picture of Jewish life and to integrate the history of Jews into the wider history of the eras and societies in which they lived. Baron called for Jews and Jewish historical studies to be integrated into traditional general world history as a key part. Baron sought to balance the tendencies toward extremes of traditionalism or modernity, seeking a third way on the question of emancipation. While Baron's earlier work was periodic, in The Jewish Community he analyzed a Jewish community that transcended time, per Elisheva Carlebach. Amnon Raz‐Krakotzkin says Baron's historiography is a call to view Jewish history as counter-history. Baron believed the diaspora to be a critical source of strength and vitality. While Baron was mainly criticizing the lachrymose conception of medieval Jewish history, "neobaronianism" has been proposed by David Engel to apply more generally.

Baron admired and even revered Graetz, who was an influence on him, but he sought to counter and critique the historical view espoused by the older historian. Engel says the Baronian view of history stresses continuities, rather than ruptures. Baron's analysis of Jewish historiography runs through Abraham Zacuto, Joseph Ha-Cohen, Solomon Ibn Verga, to Isaak Marcus Jost, Graetz, and Simon Dubnow. Baron believed older work to be "parochial." Adam Teller says his work is an alternative to history motivated by persecution and antisemitism, at the risk of de-emphasizing the impact of violence on Jewish history. Esther Benbassa is another critic of the lachrymose conception and says that Baron is joined by Cecil Roth and to a lesser extent Schorsch in restoring a less tragic vision of Jewish fate.

== Literary works ==
- The Jewish Community (3 vols., 1942)
- Jews of the United States, 1790–1840: A Documentary History (ed. with Joseph L. Blau, 3 vols., 1963)
- A Social and Religious History of the Jews (18 vols., 2d ed. 1952–1983)

== See also ==
- Jewish studies
- American Jewish Historical Society
