= Johann Hermann Schein =

German composer (1586–1630)

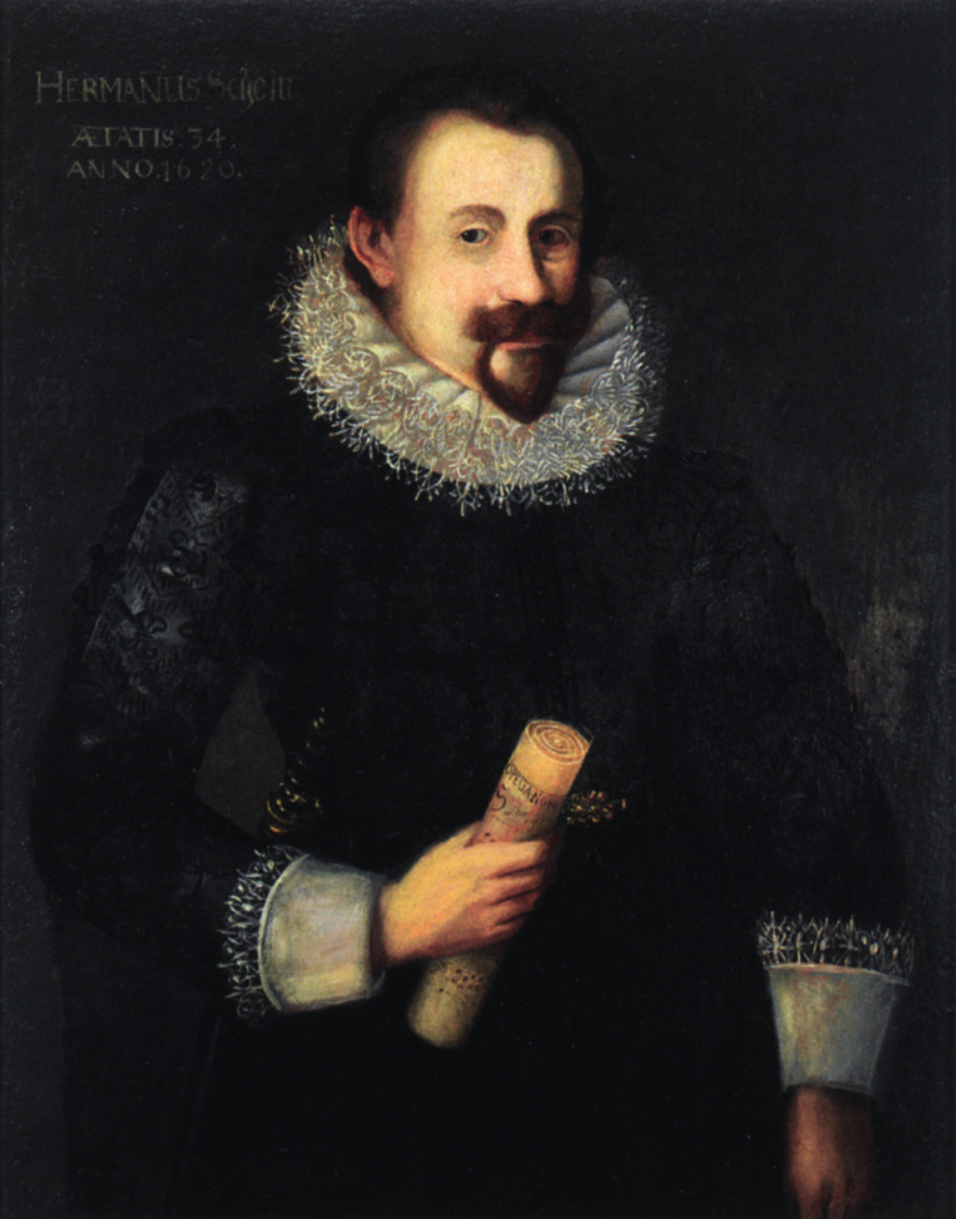
- Born: January 20, 1586; Grünhain
- Died: 19 November 1630 (aged 44); Leipzig
- Education: University of Leipzig
- Occupation: Thomaskantor

Johann Hermann Schein (20 January 1586 – 19 November 1630) was a German composer of the early Baroque era. He was Thomaskantor in Leipzig from 1615 to 1630. He was one of the first to import the early Italian stylistic innovations into German music, and was one of the most polished composers of the period.

== Biography ==
Schein was born in Grünhain. On the death of his father, Schein moved to Dresden where he joined the choir of the Elector of Saxony as a boy soprano. In addition to singing in the choir, he received a thorough musical training with Rogier Michael, the Kapellmeister, who recognized his extraordinary talent. From 1603 to 1607 he studied at Pforta, and from 1608 to 1612 attended the University of Leipzig, where he studied law in addition to liberal arts. Upon graduating, he was employed briefly by Gottfried von Wolffersdorff as the house music director and tutor to his children; later he became Kapellmeister at Weimar, and shortly thereafter became Thomaskantor, music director in Leipzig, especially cantor at the Thomasschule zu Leipzig and conducting the Thomanerchor, a post which he held for the rest of his life.

Unlike his friend Heinrich Schütz, he was afflicted with poor health, and was not to live a happy or long life. His wife died in childbirth; four of his five children died in infancy; he died in Leipzig at age 44, having suffered from tuberculosis, gout, scurvy, and a kidney disorder.

== Style ==
Schein was one of the first to absorb the innovations of the Italian Baroque—monody, the stile concertato, figured bass—and use them effectively in a German Lutheran context. While Schütz made more than one trip to Italy, Schein apparently spent his entire life in Germany, making his grasp of the Italianate style all the more remarkable. His early concertato music seems to have been modeled on Lodovico Grossi da Viadana's Cento concerti ecclesiastici, which were available in an edition prepared in Germany.

Unlike Schütz, who concentrated mainly on sacred music (although it must be borne in mind that at least two operas composed by him, among other secular works, have been lost), Schein wrote sacred and secular music in approximately equal quantities, and almost all of it was vocal. In his secular vocal music he wrote all of his own texts. Throughout his life he published alternating collections of sacred and secular music, in accordance with an intention he stated early on — in the preface to the Banchetto musicale — to publish alternately music for use in worship and social gatherings. The contrast between the two kinds of music can be quite extreme. While some of his sacred music uses the most sophisticated techniques of the Italian madrigal for a devotional purpose, such as the motet Wie lieblich sind deine Wohnungen setting verses from Psalm 84, several of his secular collections include such things as drinking songs of a surprising simplicity and humor. Some of his works attain an expressive intensity matched in Germany only by those of Schütz, for example the spectacular Fontana d'Israel or Israel's Brünnlein (1623), in which Schein declared his intent to exhaust the possibilities of German word-painting "in the style of the Italian madrigal."

Possibly his most famous collection was his only collection of instrumental music, the Banchetto musicale (Musical banquet) (1617) which contains twenty separate variation suites; they are among the earliest, and most perfect, representatives of the form. Most likely they were composed as dinner music for the courts of Weissenfels and Weimar, and were intended to be performed on viols. They consist of dances: a pavan-galliard (a normal early Baroque pair), a courante, and then an allemande-tripla. Each suite in the Banchetto is unified by mode as well as by theme.

== Published works ==
=== Sacred vocal ===
- Cymbalum Sionium (1615)
- Opella nova, geistlicher Concerten (1618)
- Fontana d'Israel, Israelis Brünnlein (1623)
- Opella nova, ander Theil, geistlicher Concerten (1626)
- Cantional oder Gesangbuch Augspurgischer Confession (1627, 1645)

=== Secular vocal ===
- Venus Kräntzlein (1609)
- Musica boscareccia (1621, and several portions published later)
- Diletti pastorali, Hirten Lust (1624)
- Studenten-Schmauss (1626)
- So da, mein liebes Brüderlein (1626)

=== Instrumental ===
- Banchetto musicale (1617)

== Sources ==
- "(85216) Schein". Minor Planet Center.
- Manfred Bukofzer, Music in the Baroque Era. New York, W.W. Norton & Co., 1947. ISBN 0-393-09745-5
- Article "Johann Hermann Schein," in The New Grove Dictionary of Music and Musicians, ed. Stanley Sadie. 20 vol. London, Macmillan Publishers Ltd., 1980. ISBN 1-56159-174-2
