= Morris Raphael Cohen =

American philosopher and lawyer (1880–1947)

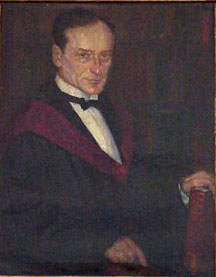
- Born: July 25, 1880; Minsk, Imperial Russia (present-day Belarus)
- Died: January 28, 1947 (aged 66); Washington, D.C., U.S.

Education
- Education: CCNY; Harvard University (PhD, 1906)
- Academic advisors: William James; Hugo Münsterberg; Josiah Royce

Philosophical work
- Era: 20th-century philosophy
- Region: Western philosophy
- School: Pragmatism; Logical positivism
- Institutions: CCNY
- Notable students: Sidney Hook; Ernest Nagel; Paul Weiss
- Main interests: Legal philosophy
- Notable ideas: Objective relativism

Morris Raphael Cohen (Belarusian: Морыс Рафаэль Коэн; July 25, 1880 (Note: Arriving in New York City in 1892 and "obliged to indicate his date of birth, Cohen chose 25 July because it was the approximate date of his arrival in his new country. His parents were unable to specify even the year of his birth, but agreed upon 1880 in order to justify Cohen's bar mitzvah in 1893, which was to take place at the end of his thirteenth year.") – January 28, 1947) was a Russian-born American judicial philosopher, lawyer, and legal scholar who united pragmatism with logical positivism and linguistic analysis. This union coalesced into the "objective relativism" fermenting at Columbia University before and during the early twentieth-century interwar period. He was father to Felix S. Cohen and Leonora Cohen Rosenfield.

== Life and career ==
Cohen was born in Minsk, Imperial Russia (present-day Belarus), the son of Bessie (Farfel) and Abraham Mordecai Cohen. He moved with his family to New York at the age of 12. He attended the City College of New York (CCNY) and Harvard University, where he studied under Josiah Royce, William James, and Hugo Münsterberg. He obtained a PhD from Harvard in 1906, with a dissertation titled Kant's Doctrine as to the Relation between Duty and Happiness.

He was Professor of Philosophy at CCNY from 1912 to 1938. He also taught law at City College and the University of Chicago 1938–41, gave courses at the New School for Social Research, and lectured in Philosophy and Law at Columbia, Cornell, Harvard, Stanford, Yale, and other universities.

Cohen was legendary as a professor for his wit, encyclopedic knowledge, and ability to demolish philosophical systems. "He could and did tear things apart in the most devastating and entertaining way; but...he had a positive message of his own", said Robert Hutchins. Bertrand Russell said of Cohen that he had the most original mind in contemporary American philosophy.

In 1923 he edited and penned an introduction to a collection of Charles Sanders Peirce essays entitled Chance, Love and Logic.

In the 1930s, Cohen helped give CCNY its reputation as the "proletarian Harvard," perhaps more than any other faculty member. He advocated liberalism in politics but opposed laissez-faire economics. Cohen also defended liberal democracy and wrote indictments of both fascism and communism. Cohen's obituary in the New York Times called him "an almost legendary figure in American philosophy, education and the liberal tradition".

On May 3, 1953, under President Buell G. Gallagher, the City College Library was dedicated to and named for Morris Raphael Cohen.

Cohen helped, with Professor Salo W. Baron, organize the Conference on Jewish Relations to study modern Jewry scientifically; he also edited its quarterly journal Jewish Social Studies.

Cohen died on January 28, 1947, in Washington, D.C.

According to Richard T. Hall, he was buried in Mount Zion Cemetery in Maspeth, New York.

== Main works ==
- Zionism: tribalism or liberalism (1919)
- Reason and Nature (1931, rev. 1953), his major philosophical work.
- Law and the Social Order (1933)
- An Introduction to Logic and the Scientific Method, with Ernest Nagel (1934)
- Random thoughts : Liberalism in life and philosophy (1936)
- Jewish studies of peace and post-war problems (1943)
- The Faith of a Liberal (1945)
- A Preface to Logic (1945)
- The Meaning of Human History (1947)

Published posthumously

- A source book in Greek science (1948)
- A Dreamer's Journey (1949), his autobiography.
- Studies in philosophy and science (1949)
- Reason and Law (1950)
- Reflections of a wondering Jew (1950)
- King Saul's daughter, a Biblical dialogue (1952)
- American Thought, a Critical Sketch (1954)
