= Vale of Tears: Revisiting the Canudos Massacre =

1992 book by Robert M. Levine

Vale of Tears: Revisiting the Canudos Massacre in Northeastern Brazil, 1893-1897
- Author: Robert M. Levine
- Language: English
- Genre: Non-fiction
- Published: 1992
- Publisher: University of California Press
- Publication place: United States
- Media type: Print (hardback & paperback)
- ISBN: 978-0-520-20343-3

Vale of Tears: Revisiting the Canudos Massacre in Northeastern Brazil, 1893–1897 is a book by historian Robert M. Levine published by the University of California Press in 1992. The book goes into detail of the Massacre that occurred in the Northeastern state of Bahia. Focused on the events from 1893-1897, the book looks at the life of Antônio Conselheiro and the city that he created. Antônio Conselheiro was a Brazilian religious leader, preacher, and the creator of Canudos, the scene of the War of Canudos (1896-1897). This war was between the state of Brazil and the 30,000 settlers that followed Antônio Conselheiro. After multiple confrontations the central government brutally took control of the city killing more than 15,000 people and destroying what was left of the town.

== Synopsis ==
Robert M. Levine's aim in this book is to look past the world view of Canudos and actually look at all the dimensions- at the local, state, regional, and national levels; and to understand Conselheiro's movement and his vision on their own terms. In 1888 slavery was abolished in Brazil and by 1889 Brazil underwent major changes within their government. They had changed from a monarchy to a republic and with that came a big change economically and politically. The state of Bahia suffered because of the changes that were being made and this allowed for people to take control and lead. Conselheiro unhappy with the government decided to go around to all local cities within the state. During the day he would repair that towns church or their local graveyard. After a long days work he would preach about God and that judgement day is coming but would also make political statements as well. He was known to be a monarchist and thought that the idea of a republic would fail. Most of the people listening to him speak were illiterate and lived a hard life out in the brutal conditions of Northeastern Brazil. Many of the former slaves or ancestors of slaves. He was a brilliant speaker and could captivate an audience like nothing anyone had seen.

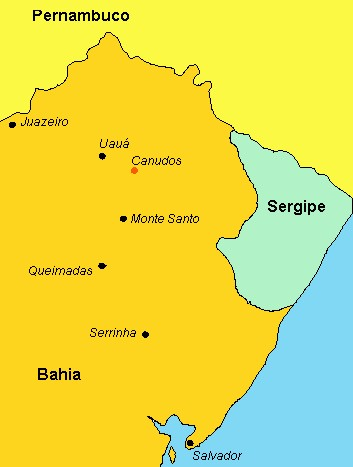
Map of Bahia including cities such as Canudos.

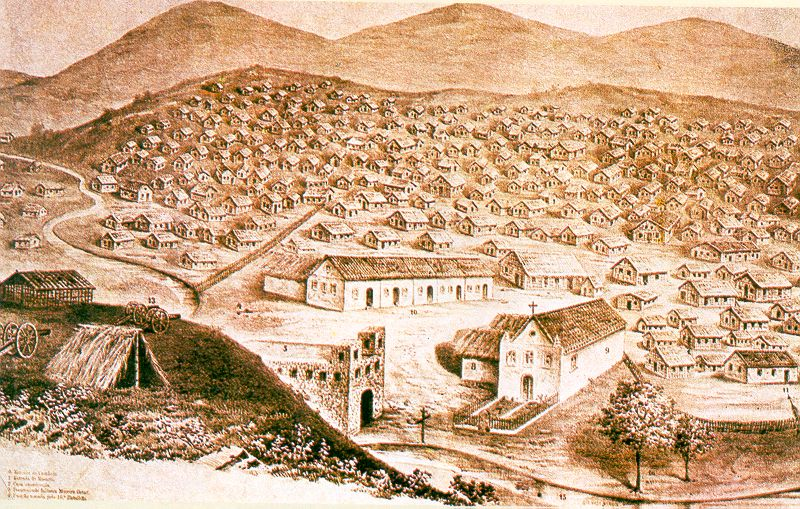
Image of Canudos.

Soon people started following him and they then created Canudos in 1893. Rumors of a crazed man leading a group of fanatics in northern Brazil soon consumed the nation. Hundreds of different newspapers were created depicting these people as crazy armed savages. This was largely because Euclides da Cunha and his writing. He wrote the book Os Sertões, a piece of literature that is a cornerstone in Brazilian literacy. Da Cunha's book depicts the people of Canudos as insane and violent. Canudos while having this bad reputation was actually quite nice compared to the rest of the backlands. Unlike many other cities Canudos lived relatively crime free. Prostitution, use of any substances including tobacco and alcohol were banned and could mean prison sentences. While food and water was always needed they had enough to supply the people unlike many other cities. Conselheiro would work during the day repairing churches and doing daily activities. He lived a modest life living just as all others did.

Being a radical religious leader Conselheiro had made enemies with both the Catholic church and the central government. For his own safety he felt the need to hire armed body guards called by the people Jagunço. Fame had grown of Canudos and because of this the government sent 30 armed men there to see if they were any real threat. The body guards confused by the armed men opened fire and a gun fight broke out. Conselheiro made it out alive. The incident caused panic and the central government wanted Canudos gone. in 1896 the federal government planned a second attack, this time with over 100 men. At this point in Canudos the population is at its peak with over 30,000 residence and almost 5,000 homes. They attacked once again and were met by 500 armed men. The government suffered many casualties and were forced to retreat. By now the myth of this town had spread all throughout Brazil. A third attack with over 800 men came to Canudos but this result was just the same. After being forced to retreat 3 times the Brazilian government had, had enough and sent 8,000 men under the command of General Artur Oscar de Andrade Guimarães. This led to the brutal murders of over 15,000 settlers and the death of Conselheiro.

== Critical reception ==
Reviewed by Jeffrey D. Needell in the Journal of Church and State 35 (1993): 910-911.

Reviewed by Jeff Lesser in the Journal of Latin American Studies 25 (1993): 397-398.
