= Vale of tears =

Religious phrase in Christianity

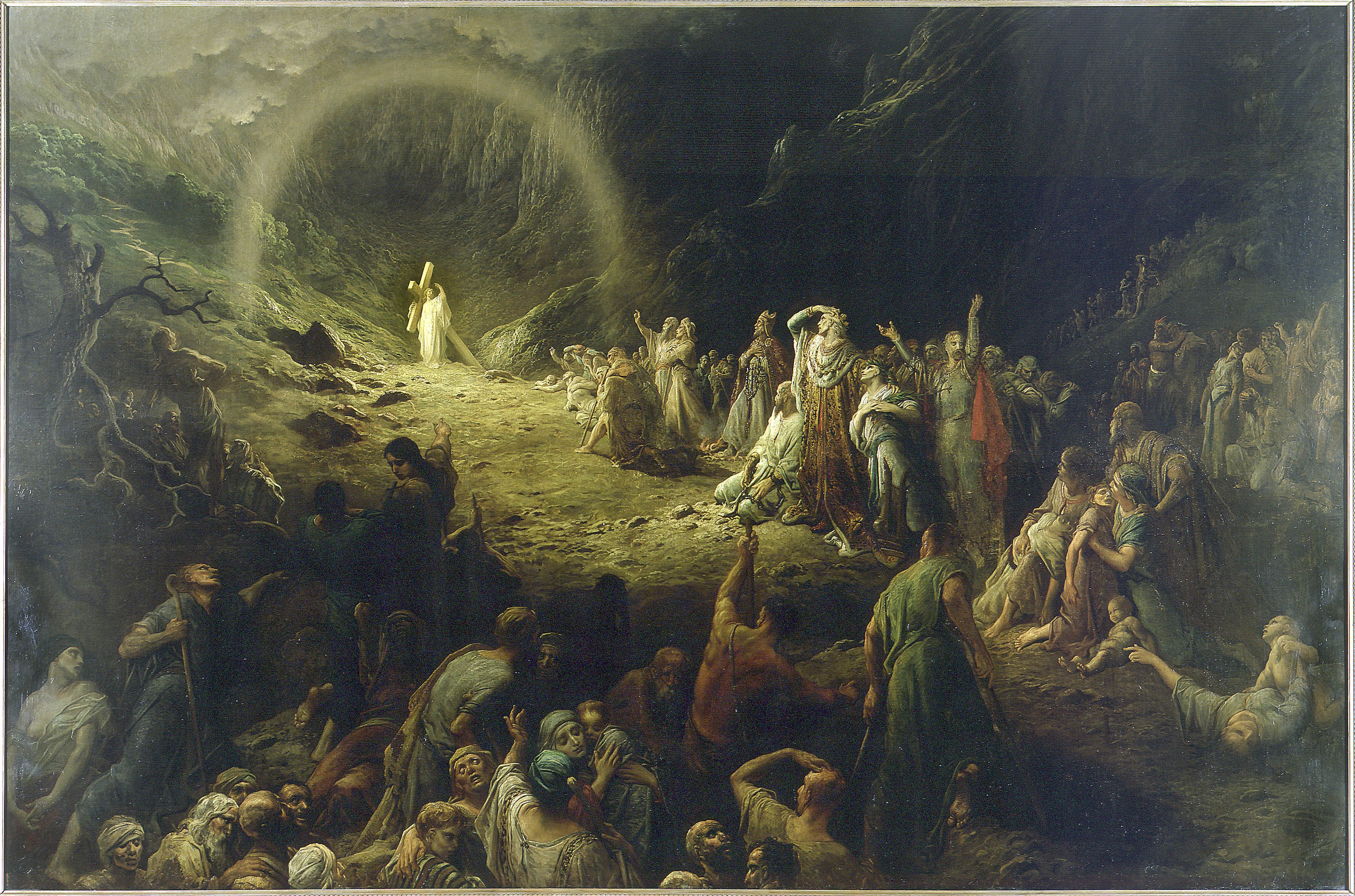
Gustave Doré, The Valley of Tears

"Vale of tears" or "Valley of tears" (Latin: vallis lacrimarum) is a Christian phrase referring to the tribulations of life that Christian doctrine says are left behind only when one leaves the world and enters Heaven. The phrase appears in some translations of Psalm 84:6, which describes those strengthened by God's blessing: "As they pass through the valley of tears (Hebrew: עֵמֶק הַבָּכָא), they make it a place of springs; the autumn rains also cover it with pools" (NIV with "Valley of Baca" replaced).

== Translations ==
The Sixto-Clementine version of the Latin Vulgate uses the phrase "valle lacrimarum" in Psalm 83:7 (the equivalent of Psalm 84:6 in English translations). Wycliffe's Bible (1395) translates the phrase as "valei of teeris", and the Bishop's Bible (1568) reads "vale of teares". The King James Version (1611), however, reads "valley of Baca", and the Psalter in the Book of Common Prayer (1662) follows the Coverdale Bible (1535) and reads "vale of misery".

Modern translations also vary, with the Revised Standard Version and New Revised Standard Version continuing the "Valley of Baca" translation, the Revised English Bible rendering it "the waterless valley", and the term "Valley of Weeping" featuring in both the New Living Translation and the American Standard Version.

== Use in Christian writing and hymnody ==
The phrase also occurs in the writings of Jerome (c. 347–420) and Boniface (c. 675–754), but was perhaps popularized by the hymn "Salve Regina", which at the end of the first stanza mentions "gementes et flentes in hac lacrimarum valle", or "mourning and weeping in this valley of tears".

The phrase also appears in "Be Still, My Soul" (1855), the English translation of the German Lutheran hymn.

== See also ==
- Meaning of life
- Mortal coil
- The Jewish liturgical song Lekhah Dodi centers one of its allegorical verses around the phrase
- Joseph ha-Cohen
