= Arthur Hertzberg =

American rabbi, historian, and activist (1921–2006)

Rabbi Arthur Hertzberg
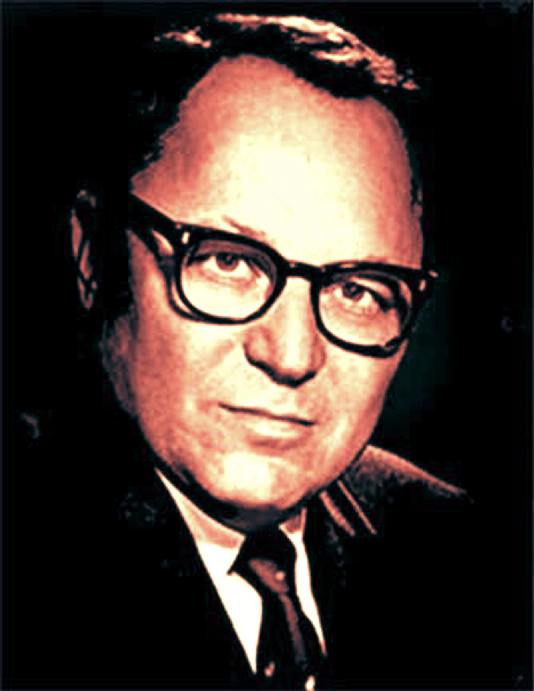
- Rabbi Arthur Hertzberg in 1972
- Title: Rabbi emeritus

Personal life
- Born: Arthur Hertzberg; June 9, 1921 Southeastern Poland
- Died: April 17, 2006 (aged 84) En route to Pascack Valley Hospital, Westwood, New Jersey, U.S.
- Spouse: Phyllis Cannon
- Children: 2
- Parent: Orthodox rabbinic scholar (father)
- Notable works: The French Enlightenment and the Jews (1968); The Zionist Idea (editor, 1959)
- Education: Johns Hopkins University; Jewish Theological Seminary of America; Columbia University
- Known for: Civil rights advocacy, Jewish–Christian dialogue, scholarship on Zionism and modern antisemitism
- Occupation: Rabbi, scholar, author, professor, civil rights activist

Religious life
- Religion: Judaism
- Denomination: Conservative Judaism
- Movement: Zionism

Jewish leader
- Synagogue: Temple Emanu-El (Englewood, New Jersey)

Arthur Hertzberg (June 9, 1921 – April 17, 2006) was a Conservative rabbi and prominent Jewish-American scholar and activist.

== Biography ==
Avraham Hertzberg was born in Lubaczów, Poland, the eldest of five children. In 1926, he left Europe with his mother and grandmother to join his father in the United States, where he adopted the name Arthur. Hertzberg recalled that, as a teenager in an Orthodox Jewish neighborhood in Baltimore, Maryland, he would not accept the notion that the literary world of talmudic learning, the kabbalistic books and the writing of the chasidim were less worthy than the Iliad, the Odyssey or Dante's Inferno. His father was an Orthodox rabbi trained in Eastern Europe, who taught Arthur to appreciate the richness of the Talmud and the other great works of Judaism. Although Hertzberg would later depart from his Orthodox upbringing and receive ordaination as a Conservative rabbi, he "never used my 'heresy' as the excuse to prefer the majority culture to my own." Hertzberg was a student of Ernst Cassirer at Columbia University in the winter of 1944–1945. After Cassirer's death in New York, Hertzberg, then a young rabbi, conducted his funeral service. He was married to the former Phyllis Cannon from 1950 until his death. They had two daughters, Dr. Linda Beth and Susan Riva, and they have four grandchildren named Rachel, Mike, Michelle, and Derek.

Hertzberg's love of Judaism and the Jewish texts was at the core of his life as a rabbi, scholar, educator and Jewish communal leader. Over the course of his more than 50-year career, Rabbi Hertzberg served as a congregational rabbi, president of both the American Jewish Policy Foundation and the American Jewish Congress, vice president of the World Jewish Congress and a leading representative of world Jewry in the historic Catholic–Jewish dialogue that commenced during the papacy of Pope John XXIII. Hertzberg was at the center of crucial events that shaped American Jewish life after World War II.

A resident of Englewood, New Jersey, Hertzberg died on April 17, 2006, of heart failure while en route to Pascack Valley Hospital in Westwood, New Jersey, at the age of 84. He was survived by his wife, daughters, brothers Rabbi Isaiah and Rabbi Joshua, and a sister, Eve Rosenfeld.

=== Social activism ===
Hertzberg participated in the 1943 Rabbis' march, walked with Martin Luther King Jr. in both the 1963 March on Washington for Jobs and Freedom and the 1965 "Bloody Sunday", during the first of the Selma to Montgomery marches, at the height of the American civil rights movement. Hertzberg also served as an intermediary between the American Jewish community and Secretary of State Henry Kissinger. Hertzberg played a major role in significant issues facing world Jewry in the decades following World War II, including discussions with the Roman Catholic Church over the Vatican's refusal to release documents pertaining to Pius XII.

== Views and influences ==
Mordecai Kaplan was an influence on Hertzberg when he attended the Jewish Theological Seminary in New York City. Kaplan proved to him that with talent and guts, you could be your own man even in mainstream America. He agreed with Kaplan and Salo W. Baron, that cultural and religious identity in America would continue to exist "only if they were redefined and reconstructed." After the Six-Day War in 1967, he proposed the creation of a Palestinian state alongside Israel and debated with Golda Meir and Menachem Begin over their policies.

Hertzberg challenged the wisdom of what he viewed as banking the future of Jewish continuity on the twin pillars of unquestioned support for Israel and the veneration of the Holocaust. Referring to the United States Holocaust Memorial Museum in Washington, D.C., as "the national cathedral of American Jewry's Jewishness", Hertzberg questioned whether the memory of the Holocaust was sufficient to keep Jews "on the reservation." Citing demographic studies, he contended that the proliferation of courses on the Holocaust would not be sufficient to stop a large number of Jews from leaving the Jewish community.

== Academic career ==
Hertzberg graduated from Johns Hopkins University in 1940, received rabbinic ordination from the Jewish Theological Seminary of America in 1943 and a Ph.D. in history from Columbia University in 1966. He began his career as the director of the campus Hillel for Amherst College and the University of Massachusetts Amherst, and taught at Princeton, Rutgers, Columbia, Hebrew University, and Dartmouth. He was the Bronfman Visiting Professor of the Humanities at New York University from 1991 until his death in 2006.

== Rabbinic career ==
In addition to his academic posts, Hertzberg was a rabbi for congregations in Philadelphia and Nashville, served as a chaplain in the United States Air Force from 1951 to 1953. He lived in Englewood, New Jersey, where he served as rabbi of Temple Emanu-El (at the time in Englewood) from 1956 to 1985, and remained as rabbi emeritus until his death. He also served as president of the American Jewish Policy Foundation since 1978, president of the American Jewish Congress from 1972 to '78, and vice president of the World Jewish Congress from 1975 to 1991.

== Meeting with John Paul II ==
During Pope John Paul's March 2000 Jerusalem visit, he asked the Pope numerous questions about his activities during the Second World War.

== Jewish scholarship ==
Hertzberg also made his mark in Jewish scholarship. His landmark book, The French Enlightenment and the Jews: The Origins of Modern Anti-Semitism (1968), argued that the source of modern antisemitism could be traced to the ideas of such Age of Enlightenment philosophers as Voltaire. Similarly, his The Zionist Idea: A Historical Analysis and Reader (1959) pioneered the study of Zionism and provided generations of students with the understanding that modern Zionism was a secular movement to remake Jewish identity into one of the many modern secular nationalisms. Finally, although a self-styled pragmatic liberal, Hertzberg saw no contradiction between his political convictions and his reverence for a Jewish tradition shorn of its religious fundamentalism.

Hertzberg wrote, edited or co-edited over thirteen books. Hertzberg had planned to write two more books and had partially completed one at the time of his death, entitled This I Believe, an exploration of his personal theology. He had also intended to write a book explicating the Talmud to an educated but non-Orthodox Jewish audience, preserving the integrity of the source material but also demonstrating its relevance and accessibility to modern readers.

In his memoir A Jew in America, Hertzberg frequently referred to American poet Ralph Waldo Emerson. Emerson, a descendant of American Puritans who revolted against his heritage and became a Unitarian, wrote that "every man is a conveyance on which all his ancestors ride." Hertzberg said he may not have opted to agree with every word of his Jewish forebears but wrote "my respect and reverence for them is the foundation of my being."

== Published works ==
- Essays on Jewish Life and Thought (1959) (co-editor)
- The Zionist Idea (1959)
- The Outbursts That Await Us (1963)
- The French Enlightenment and the Jews (1968) – won the first Amran Award as the best work of nonfiction in the Jewish field.
- Judaism (1961)
- Being Jewish in America (1978)
- The Jews in America: Four Centuries of an Uneasy Encounter (1989), ISBN 0-231-10841-9
- Jewish Polemics (1992)
- At Home Only with God (1993)
- The Zionist Idea (1997)
- Jews: The Essence and Character of a People (1998) (co-authored with Aron Hirt-Manheimer)
- A Jew in America: My Life And a People's Struggle for Identity (2002)
- The Fate of Zionism : A Secular Future for Israel & Palestine (2003).
