= Yosef Hayim Yerushalmi =

American scholar of Jewish history (1932–2009)

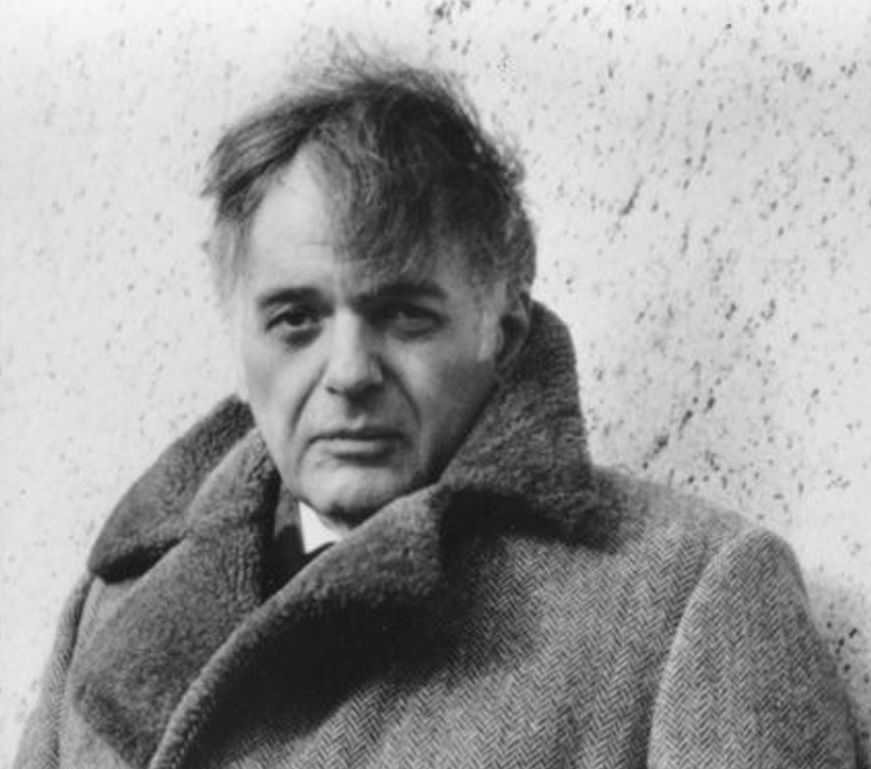
- Yosef Hayim Yerushalmi in 1989
- Born: Joseph Hyman Erushalmy; May 20, 1932; The Bronx, New York City, U.S.
- Died: December 8, 2009 (aged 77)
- Occupations: Historian, Professor
- Awards: National Jewish Book Award (1983), Guggenheim Fellowship (1989–90)

Academic background
- Education: Yeshiva University (BA), Columbia University (PhD)

Academic work
- Discipline: Jewish history, historiography
- Institutions: Columbia University, Harvard University
- Notable works: Zakhor: Jewish History and Jewish Memory

Yosef Hayim Yerushalmi (born Joseph Hyman Erushalmy; May 20, 1932 – December 8, 2009) was the Salo Wittmayer Baron Professor of Jewish History, Culture and Society at Columbia University, a position he held from 1980 to 2008.

== Early life and education ==
Yerushalmi was born Joseph Hyman Erushalmy in the Bronx, New York City on May 20, 1932, to Yiddish-speaking Russian parents who had immigrated to the United States. His father was a Hebrew teacher.

Yerushalmi attended the Manhattan Talmudical Academy, now known as Yeshiva University High School for Boys. In 1953, Yerushalmi received his bachelor's degree from Yeshiva University. According to his 1952 Yeshiva College yearbook, he went by "sad-eyed Joe" in college and told some students that he had exotic origins, joking that he may have come from Turkey, Tajikistan, and Oxford. Later, in 1957 he was ordained as a rabbi at the Jewish Theological Seminary of America and afterward served as rabbi of Beth Emeth, a synagogue in Larchmont. He went on to receive a doctorate from Columbia University in 1966. Salo Baron was his dissertation director. After completing his doctoral studies, he devoted his life's work to academia and the scholarly study of Jewish history and historiography. He would later write: "I live with the ironic awareness that the very mode in which I delve into the Jewish past represents a decisive break with that past."

== Career ==
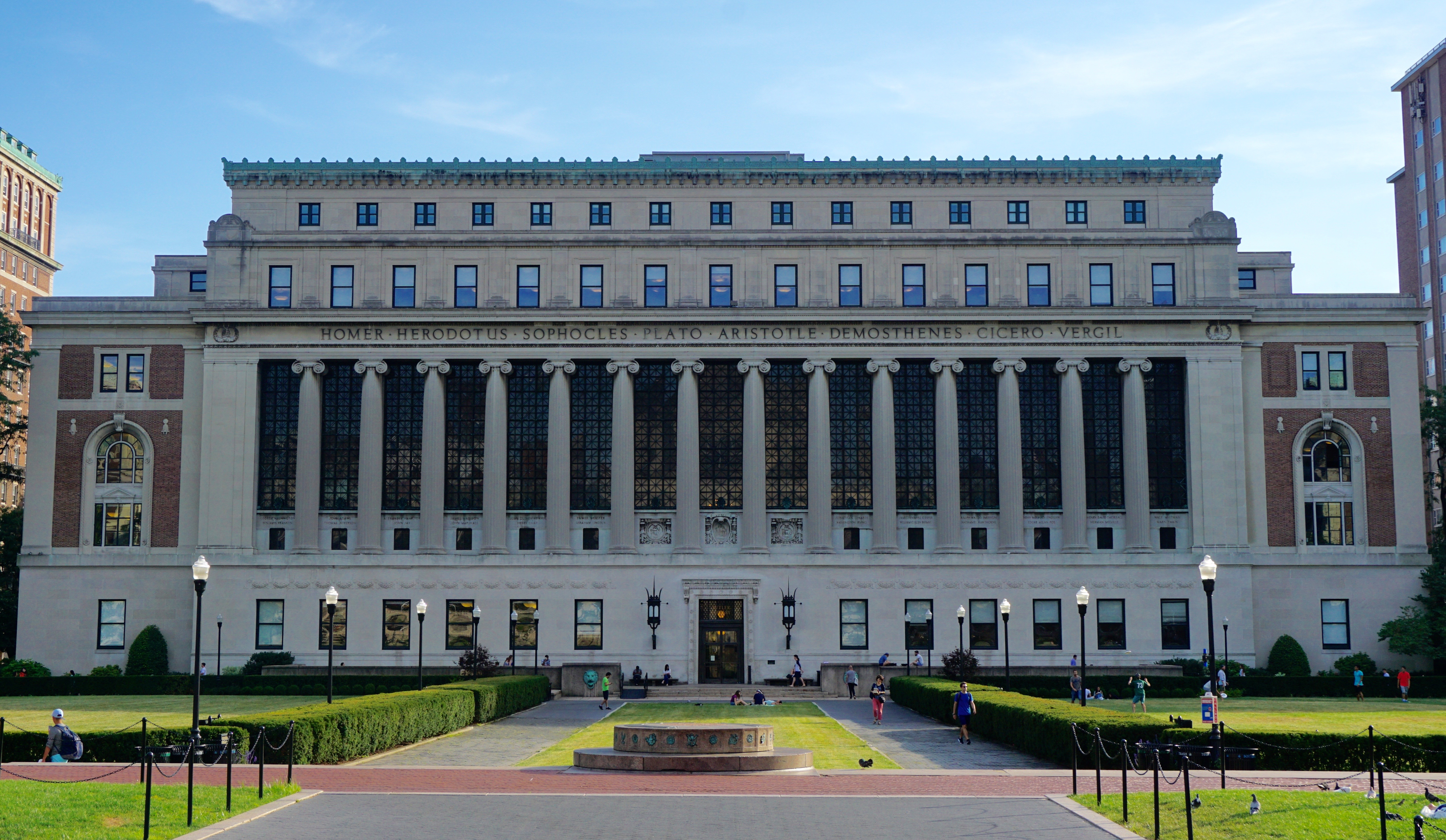
Butler Library Columbia University

From the time of receiving his doctorate until his appointment to the Columbia faculty, Yerushalmi taught at Harvard University, where he was Jacob E. Safra Professor of Jewish History and Sephardic Civilization and chairman of the Department of Near Eastern Languages and Civilizations. In 1980 he gave a series of four lectures, "Stroum Lectures in Jewish Studies", at the University of Washington in Seattle. These lectures became the basis of his important work, Zakhor: Jewish History and Jewish Memory, which was first published in 1982. In 1984, Leon Wieseltier wrote that whereas Yerushalmi was already established as "one of the Jewish community's most important historians" Yerushalmi's latest book "Zakhor" would "establish him as one of its most important critics." From 1980 to 2008 he was the Salo Wittmayer Baron Professor of Jewish History, Culture and Society at Columbia University.

Professor Yerushalmi died of emphysema on December 8, 2009. He was succeeded at Columbia University by Elisheva Carlebach Yoffen.

== Books ==
- Israel, der unerwartete Staat, Tübingen: Mohr Siebeck, 2006, ISBN 978-3-16-148860-3 (English translation: Israel, The Unexpected State) - 2005]
- The Lisbon Massacre of 1506 (Cincinnati: HUC Press, 1976)
- Zakhor: Jewish History and Jewish Memory - 1996 (University of Washington Press, Seattle 1982)
- Freud's Moses: Judaism Terminable and Interminable – 1993
- Haggadah and History: A Panorama in Facsimile of Five Centuries of the Printed Haggadah (Philadelphia:JPS 1975). Second edition, 1997. Republished with a new preface in 2005.
- From Spanish Court to Italian Ghetto - 1971
- "A Jewish Classic in the Portuguese Language:Samuel Usque's Consoloçam" (Lisbon:Fundac̜ão Calouste Gulbenkian, 1989)

== Honors and Prizes ==
- National Jewish Book Award in the Jewish History category for Zakhor: Jewish History and Jewish Memory, 1983
- National Jewish Book Award in the Jewish Thought category for Freud's Moses: Judaism Terminable and Interminable, 1992
- Fellow of the American Academy of Arts and Sciences
- National Foundation for Jewish Culture: Jewish Cultural Achievement Award, 1995
- Fellow of the American Academy for Jewish Research
- Honorary Member of the Portuguese Academy of History in Lisbon
- Newman Medal for Distinguished Achievement by the City University of New York, 1976
- Fellow of the National Endowment for the Humanities, 1976–77
- Rockefeller Fellow in the Humanities, 1983–84
- Guggenheim Fellow, 1989–90
- The Dr. Leopold Lucas Prize by the University of Tübingen, 2005
