= The Valley of Tears (Doré) =

Painting by Gustave Doré

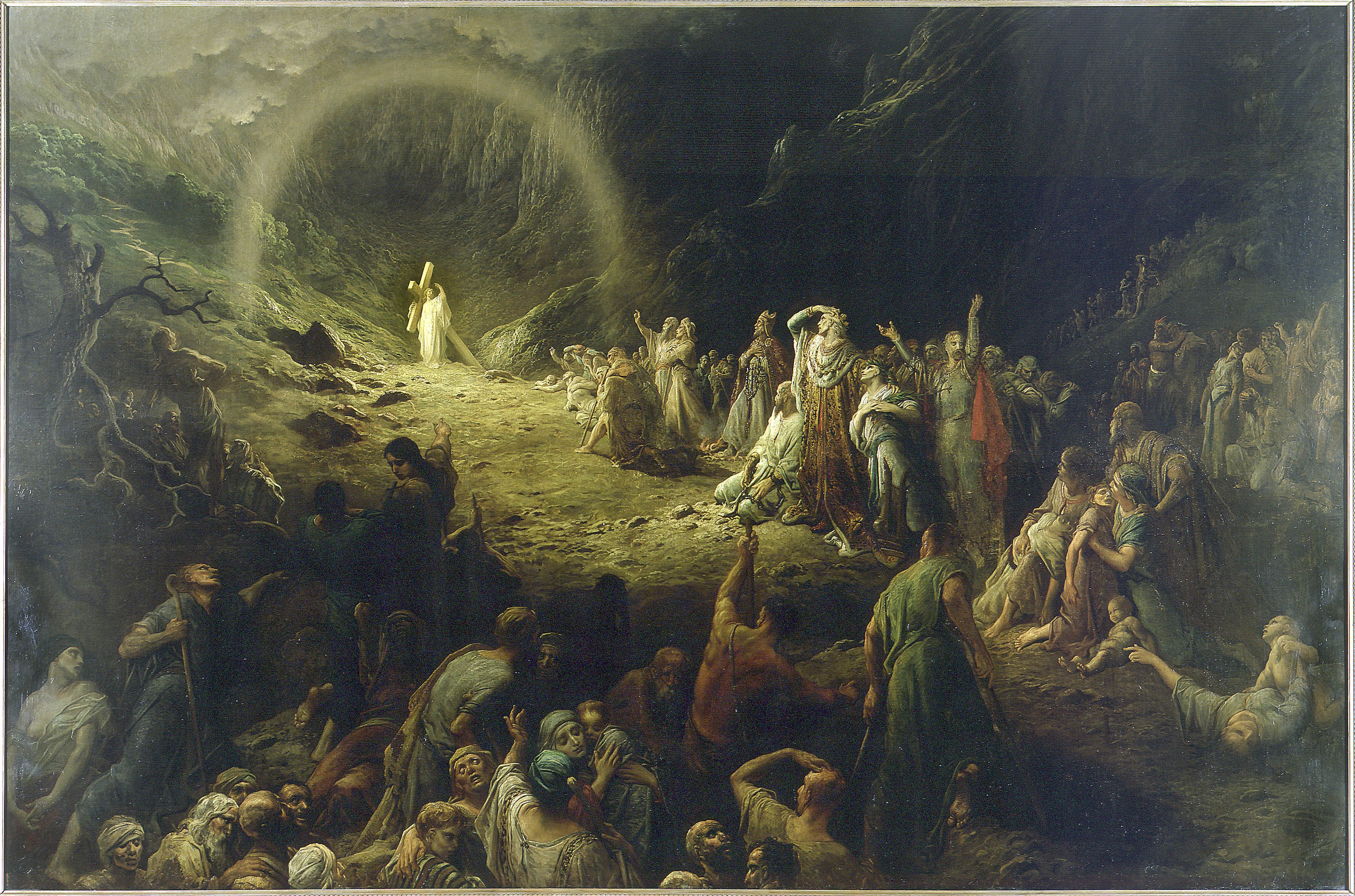
- Artist: Gustave Doré
- Year: 1883
- Medium: Oil on canvas
- Dimensions: 413.5 cm × 627 cm (162.8 in × 247 in)
- Location: Petit Palais, Paris

The Valley of Tears (French: La Vallée de Larmes) is an oil-on-canvas painting by French artist Gustave Doré, from 1883. It is very large (413.5cm x 627cm). It was bought by the city of Paris in 1984 and is currently in the collection of the Petit Palais. It was one of a great number of works Doré completed on biblical themes. It was begun at the time of his mother’s death, and completed only very shortly before he himself died.

== Subject ==
The subject of the painting is inspired by a verse in the Gospel of Saint Matthew (11:28) "Come unto me, all ye that labour and are heavy laden, and I will give you rest." It depicts those experiencing intense suffering turning towards the distant figure of Christ, who is carrying his cross and indicating to them to follow him. The light radiating from the Christ figure reveals a barren, steeply sloping mountain landscape through which presses a mixed crowd of people, princes and paupers, children and old people. Their clothes evoke the Middle East, the birthplace of Christianity. Unusually for a religious picture, Christ is in the background, with the foreground emphasizing the weeping crowds of the destitute. This is an example of the humanism that also characterised many of his secular works.

== History ==
The painting was one of twenty large canvasses commissioned from Doré in 1867, following the enormous success of his illustrated Holy Bible. They were exhibited in London at the Doré Gallery from 1869 to 1892, where they were seen by around two and a half million visitors. Most of the paintings, including this one, were then sent on tour in the United States, where they were shown in a traveling exhibition until 1898. After that they were apparently forgotten until they were found in 1947 in a Manhattan warehouse, sold at auction and dispersed. Three of these paintings, including the current one were bought by the Petit Palais, in 1984-1985. In 2005 it underwent conservation work and was remounted, going back on display in 2006.

A study for the work by Doré also exists. It was acquired in 1992 from the Samuel Clapp Fiduciary Company Ltd. and is in the collection of the Strasbourg Museum of Modern and Contemporary Art.
