= Adam Teller =

English historian

Adam J. Teller
- Born: 1962 (age 63–64); London, England
- Occupation: Historian

Academic background
- Education: Oxford University; University of Jerusalem

Academic work
- Discipline: Jewish history
- Sub-discipline: Eastern European Jews
- Institutions: Brown University

Adam J. Teller (born 1962) is an English historian whose research focuses on the social, economic, and cultural development of the Eastern European Jews during the early modern period. He is a Professor of History and Judaic Studies at Brown University and a fellow of the American Academy for Jewish Research.

== Biography ==
Born in London, England, Teller completed his undergraduate studies at the University of Oxford in 1984, reading Hebrew and Jewish History. He moved to Israel to begin his graduate studies at the Hebrew University of Jerusalem, receiving his MA in 1990 and his PhD in 1997. His doctoral thesis, written under the direction of Prof. Jacob Goldberg was awarded the annual Bloomfield Prize for the university's Outstanding Doctorate Dissertation in the Humanities. He then taught in the Dept. of Jewish History at the University of Haifa from 1997 to 2010, after which he moved to Brown University in Providence, Rhode Island.

== Publications ==
Teller is the author of three monographs, editor of four collections of essays, and has published over fifty academic articles in English, Hebrew, Polish, and German.

His first book, The Jewish Quarter of Poznań and its Population in the First Half of the 17th Century, was published in Hebrew by the Magnes Press, Jerusalem in 2003. As its title suggests, it is a demographic, social, and cultural history of one Europe's largest Jewish urban centers at the turn of the seventeenth century.

His next book, Money, Power, and Influence in 18th Century Lithuania: The Jews on the Radziwiłł Estates, was published first in Hebrew by Merkaz Zalman Shazar in Jerusalem in 2005 and, in a revised and updated English version by Stanford University Press in 2016. This study is a reconceptualization of the eighteenth-century Poland-Lithuanian magnate economy from the perspective of its connections with the market, with which Jews were intimately connected, rather than of its productive capabilities, with which they were not.

His latest book, Rescue the Surviving Souls: The Great Jewish Refugee Crisis of the Seventeenth Century was published by Princeton University Press in 2020. A study of the huge refugee crisis sparked by the mid-seventeenth century wars in the Polish-Lithuanian Commonwealth, this is the first book to examine this horrific moment of displacement and flight, and to assess its social, economic, religious, cultural, and psychological consequences. In 2021, it was jointly awarded the inaugural Rachel Feldhay Brenner Award in Polish Jewish Studies, was honorably mentioned for the Kulczycki Book Prize in Polish Studies, and was a finalist for the 2020 National Jewish Book Award (History). It is currently being translated into Hebrew and Polish.

His edited volumes are Studies on the History of the Jews in Old Poland: Scripta Hierosolomitana 38, Jerusalem: Magnes Press 1998; Borders and Boundaries in the History of the Jews in Old Poland (Polin vol. 22), co-edited with Magda Teter, Oxford-Portland: The Littman Library 2010; and Purchasing Power: The Economics of Modern Jewish History, co-edited with Rebecca Kobrin, Philadelphia: The University of Pennsylvania Press 2015.

== Other academic activity ==
Teller was the editor of two sections of The YIVO Encyclopedia of the Jews of Eastern Europe, (Editor-in-Chief, Gershon Hundert: Poland-Lithuania, 1000-1795 and Economic History.

He was one of the co-founders of the Early Modern Workshop and on its board from 2004 to 2013. He presented materials on early modern Polish Jewish society and culture on a regular basis.

From 2005 to 2010, Teller was a member of the core academic team for the award-winning POLIN: Museum for the History of Polish Jews in Warsaw. He was responsible for the two early modern galleries of the Core Exhibition, Paradisus Judaeorum and Into the Country. Together with the rest of the team, he was granted the Order of Merit for Contribution to Polish Culture, Zasłużony dla Kultury Polskiej, by Poland's Ministry of Culture in 2015.

He was also one of the directors of The Pinkassim Project, which was responsible for identifying and scanning 220 Jewish Community Record books from early modern Europe. In co-operation with the Israel National Library and with financial support from the Rothschild Foundation Europe, these materials are now freely accessible on the National Library's website.

== Personal life ==
Teller is married to Rachel Rojanski, also a professor at Brown University, and author of the award-winning study, Yiddish in Israel: A History. He is the father of three daughters (Osnat, Shira, and Na'ama) from his previous marriage.

He was President of Sulam Ya'akov, a small reform community in Zikhron Ya'akov, Israel from 2000 to 2002. Since 2012, he has been a member of the TBZ (Temple Beth Zion) community in Brookline, Massachusetts. In 2020 he was named a TBZ "Community Hero" by the Synagogue Council of Massachusetts for his work in setting up and running a zoom morning prayer group (minyan) during the COVID-19 pandemic.
