= Robert Bonfil =

Israeli historian

- Hebrew: רוברט בונפיל
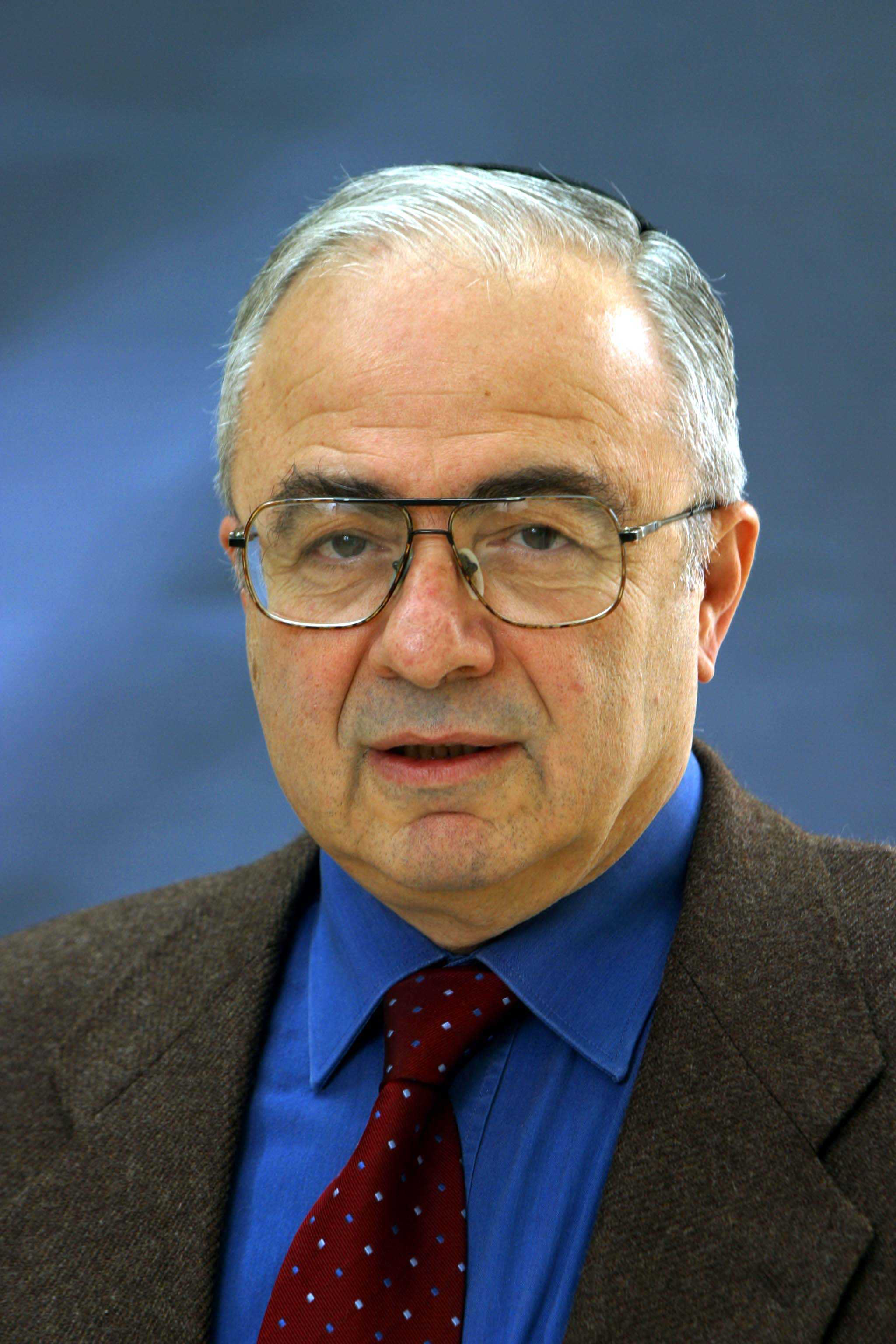
- Born: 1937 (age 88–89)

Academic work
- Discipline: history
- Sub-discipline: Jewish history
- Institutions: Hebrew University of Jerusalem
- Main interests: history of the Jews in Italy history of the Jews in the Byzantine Empire
- Notable works: Jewish Life in Renaissance Italy

Robert (Roberto, Reuven) Bonfil (Hebrew: רוברט בונפיל) is an Israeli scholar of pre-modern Jewish history and modern Jewish historiography. He is a professor at the Hebrew University of Jerusalem. His work focuses on the history of the Jews in Italy and the history of the Jews in the Byzantine Empire. He was born in 1937 in Greece and is a Holocaust survivor.

== Publications ==
- Bonfil, Robert (1994). Jewish Life in Renaissance Italy. Translated by Oldcorn, Anthony. University of California Press. ISBN 978-0-520-07350-0.
- Bonfil, Robert (2009). History and Folklore in a Medieval Jewish Chronicle: The Family Chronicle of Aḥima'az Ben Paltiel. BRILL. ISBN 978-90-04-17385-9.
- Bonfil, Robert (2012). Jews in Byzantium: dialectics of minority and majority cultures. Jerusalem studies in religion and culture. Leiden: Brill. ISBN 978-90-04-20355-6.
