= Goldbaum =

Goldbaum is a surname. Notable people with the surname include:

- David Goldbaum (1858–1930), Mexican surveyor and politician
- Marcus Goldbaum (1835–1886), Prussian-born American pioneer and prospector
- Meshulam Zalman Goldbaum (1836–1915), Hebrew writer and playwright
- Wilhelm Goldbaum (1843–1912), German author

== See also ==
- Goldblum
