= Goldbloom =

Goldbloom is a surname. Notable people with the surname include:

- Anthony Goldbloom (born 1983), Australian businessman
- David Goldbloom (born 1953), Canadian psychiatrist
- Goldie Goldbloom (born 1964), Australian writer
- Michael Goldbloom (born 1953), Canadian lawyer, publisher, and academic administrator; son of Victor Goldbloom
- Richard Goldbloom (1924–2021), Canadian pediatrician, professor, and academic administrator
- Ruth Goldbloom (1923–2012), Canadian philanthropist
- Sam Goldbloom (1919–1999), Australian peace and human rights activist
- Victor Goldbloom (1923–2016), Canadian pediatrician, lecturer, and politician

== See also ==
- Goldblum
