= Menahem Amelander =

Dutch-Jewish author and historian

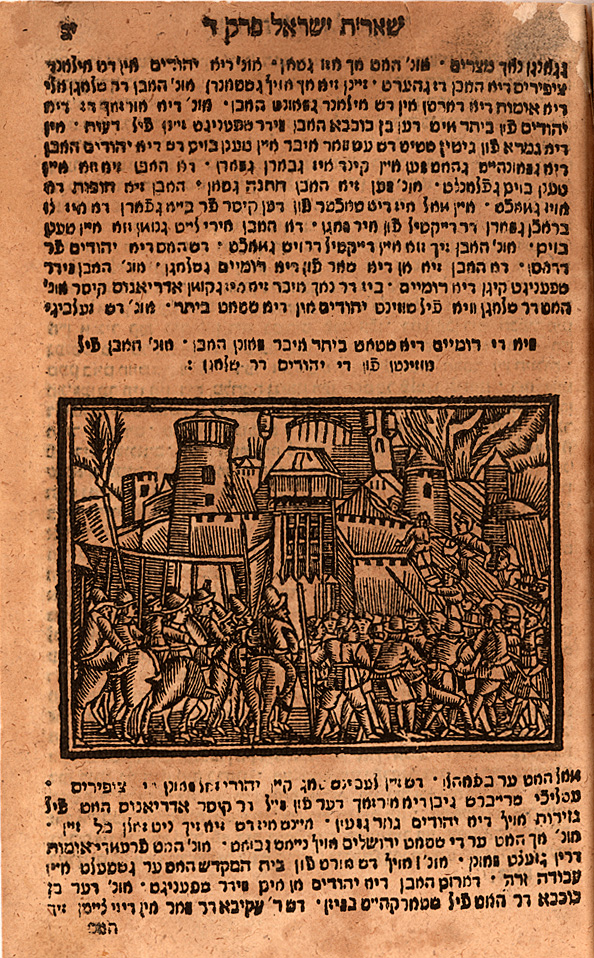
She'erit Yisra'el. Amsterdam : Kosman ben Yosef Barukh, 1770 or 1771.

Menahem Mann Ben Solomon ha-Levi Amelander was a Dutch-Jewish author and historian of the 18th century. He died before 1767.

== Work ==
His 1743 Old Yiddish chronicle, Sheyris Yisroel (Sheʼerit Yiśraʼel, Remnant of Israel) is a continuation of his Yiddish translation of Josippon with a general history of the Jews in the diaspora until 1740. He also drew on the history of Jacques Basnage. Maks Erik and Israel Zinberg considered it the foremost representative of its genre. It was cited by Abraham Trebitsch with his Qorot ha-'Ittim and Abraham Chaim Braatbard with his Ayn Naye Kornayk. Zinberg called it "the most important work of Old Yiddish historiographical literature". It is a continuation of the traditional track of Jewish historiography. It inspired Benzion Dinur and Simon Dubnow and the maskilim. It is considered one of the first original Jewish histories composed in Yiddish. It continued to be reprinted into the 19th century.

== Jewish Encyclopedia Bibliography ==
- Goudsmit's edition of Sheyrit Yisrael;
- Steinschneider, Cat. Bodl, No. 6365;
- Fürst, Bibl. Jud. ii. 320;
- Rabbinovicz, Katalog, No. 12 (No. 917);
- Roest, Cat. der Rosenthal'schen Bibl. i. 63, 64;
- Zedner, Cat. Hebr. Books, Brit. Mus. p. 531;
- Benjacob, Oẓar ha-Sefarim, pp. 218, 562.
