= Israel Zinberg =

Russian-Jewish chemist and historian

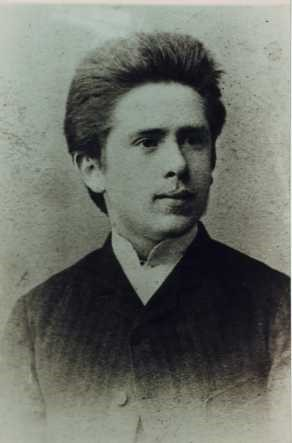
- Born: 1872 or 1873; Lanovka
- Died: 1938, 1939, or 1943

Academic background
- Education: Basle University

Academic work
- Discipline: Jewish literature
- Sub-discipline: Yiddish literature
- Institutions: Jewish University in Petrograd
- Notable works: Geshikhte fun der Literaturbei Yidn

Israel Zinberg (also known as Srul, Izrail, Yisroel Tsinberg; born Sergei Lazarevich Tsinberg) (1872 or 1873 – 1938, 1939 or 1943) was a Russian-Jewish chemist and a historian of Jewish literature. His work is significant in the field of Yiddish literature and Jewish literary history.

== Biography ==
Zinberg was born into a Hasidic family in Lanovka, near Kremenets. His father had become an ardent maskil. He attended Karlsruhe Institute of Technology, where he received a chemical engineering degree in 1895, and a doctorate from Basle University the same year. In 1898 he got a job as the manager of a chemical lab at the Putilov Plant in St. Petersburg where he worked until he was arrested in 1938.

While abroad he became interested in Marxism, but it lost its attraction for him before his return to Russia in 1897. In 1914 he wrote in a letter to Samuel Niger, "In my younger years I went for a time to the Marxist synagogue, until I realized that very important prayers are missing from its prayerbook." However, Marxism had an influence on his work and his emphasis on historical materialism and the "democratic religion of the heart," a longing for a more equal and just society. For example, in his analysis of the aftermath of the Khmelnytsky pogroms he analyzed the "class struggle" dynamics.

He became head of the laboratory in 1905 and he published many articles on chemistry and metallurgy in Russian and German journals. He participated in the Society for the Promotion of Culture among the Jews of Russia, publishing an article in Yiddish on popular science and an essay in Russian on Isaac Baer Levinsohn in 1900. He wrote a column in Voskhod from 1901 to 1906, promoting national consciousness for the Jewish intelligentsia. His 1903 essay argued in favor of Yiddish as a popular language of culture as opposed to Hebrew as a national language. He joined the Folkspartei in 1905 and wrote for its publications, and represented it in the Jewish National Council in 1918. He was the academic secretary of the Jewish University in Petrograd, where he taught Jewish and Yiddish literary history from 1919 to 1925. In advocating for literary activity in Yiddish, he argued, "language exists for the people, not the people for the language." His work is within the haskalah tradition or the Jewish enlightenment.

Zinberg was not a professional historian by background or training, but he worked as a chemical engineer and pursued literary history as an "avocation." He was a member of the St. Petersburg school of Jewish scholars along with Simon Dubnow. He drew on the works of Leopold Zunz, David Kaufmann, David Kahana, Moritz Steinschneider and Ber Borokhov as well as Solomon Birnbaum, Maks Erik, and Max Weinreich.

His 1905 article Dva techeniia v evreiskoi zhizni (Two Currents in Jewish Life) outlined his theory of Jewish history, the basis of the structure of his later voluminous work, a centuries-long struggle between popular mysticism and aristocratic rationalism. It can be seen as a critique of the negative attitude expressed by Heinrich Graetz toward, and a defense of, Jewish mysticism. He idealized the merging of these trends such as that of Yehuda ha-Levi.

Zinberg's work is foundational to the field of Old Yiddish literary studies. Zinberg worked within the framework of the Wissenschaft des Judentums even as he took a different approach to his engagement with the subject. Steven T. Katz in a 1977 review of History of Jewish Literature wrote that, "Israel Zinberg's History is the most complete and able treatment of its subject which exists... the work remains the best treatment of its subject."

Originally published in Russia in the Yiddish language as Geshikhte fun der Literaturbei Yidn, the work spans 12 volumes and different locations and historical time periods.

In 1934 Zinberg wrote in a letter to his friend Joseph Opatoshu:

You know that the old Petersburg occupied a special place in the history of the Russian Jewish intelligentsia ... The local community served as an important center which influenced ... the whole Russian Jewry. Alas, after the October upheaval, the cultural importance of the "Jewish Petersburg" fell very low. Nearly nothing remained of the old intelligentsia ... Here I am, once one of the "young blood", a radical", now "the last of the Mohicans" ... I now write about nothing but our past, the culture we inherited from our forefathers. Yet the hell of it is, my interest in public affairs hasn't died out completely. I feel sometimes like talking with live people, not just the old dust of generations past.

In 1936 regarding Dubnow to Opatoshu he wrote:

Dubnow's work disappointed me greatly. He tried to be strictly, scientifically objective, and so the book was written in a tone that is neither hot nor cold. In cultural history strict objectivity is an impossibility, for when the historical investigator illuminates the facts, his own Weltanschauung must reveal itself.

Regarding his own worldview he wrote:

no matter how different the periods in the cultural life of the Jewish community in Europe, they are all united by one main problem which runs like a red thread through all aspects of the national creativity. The basic motif, the life nerve of Jewish literature, is the question concerning the purpose of human life. To what end does man live? In what does the goal consist? How can man's great suffering and the endless sorrows of the 'chosen' people be justified? How is the tragic mystery of the world to be explained? How can one resolve the great enigma, the profound contradiction: the Creator, a God full of compassion, and the world so steeped in evil and corruption?

On April 4, 1938, the NKVD arrested Zinberg for Anti-Soviet agitation (Article 58 of the RSFSR Penal Code). Zinberg rejected the charges of anti-Soviet propaganda. He may have been arrested due to his independence, carrying on correspondence with friends abroad and publishing his work out of Vilna. Because he was greatly valued at the chemical plant as an "old specialist," he was kept on for six weeks after the arrest. On June 21, 1938 he was sentenced and sent to the Far East transit camp. Some sources report that he died in Vladivostok that same year. Michael Beizer believes he died around New Year's Eve or Day 1939 of a heart attack. Mark Wischnitzer believed he didn't die until 1943.

== Publications ==
- Zinberg, Israel (1973). A History of Jewish Literature. Press of Case Western Reserve University. ISBN 978-0-8295-0241-1. (multiple volumes)
  - Zinberg, Israel (1972). A history of Jewish literature. Internet Archive. Cleveland : Press of Case Western Reserve University. ISBN 978-0-8295-0228-2.
  - "A history of Jewish literature". Internet Archive. 1972.
