= Canadian Museum of Immigration at Pier 21 =

Coordinates: 44°38′16″N 63°33′57″W

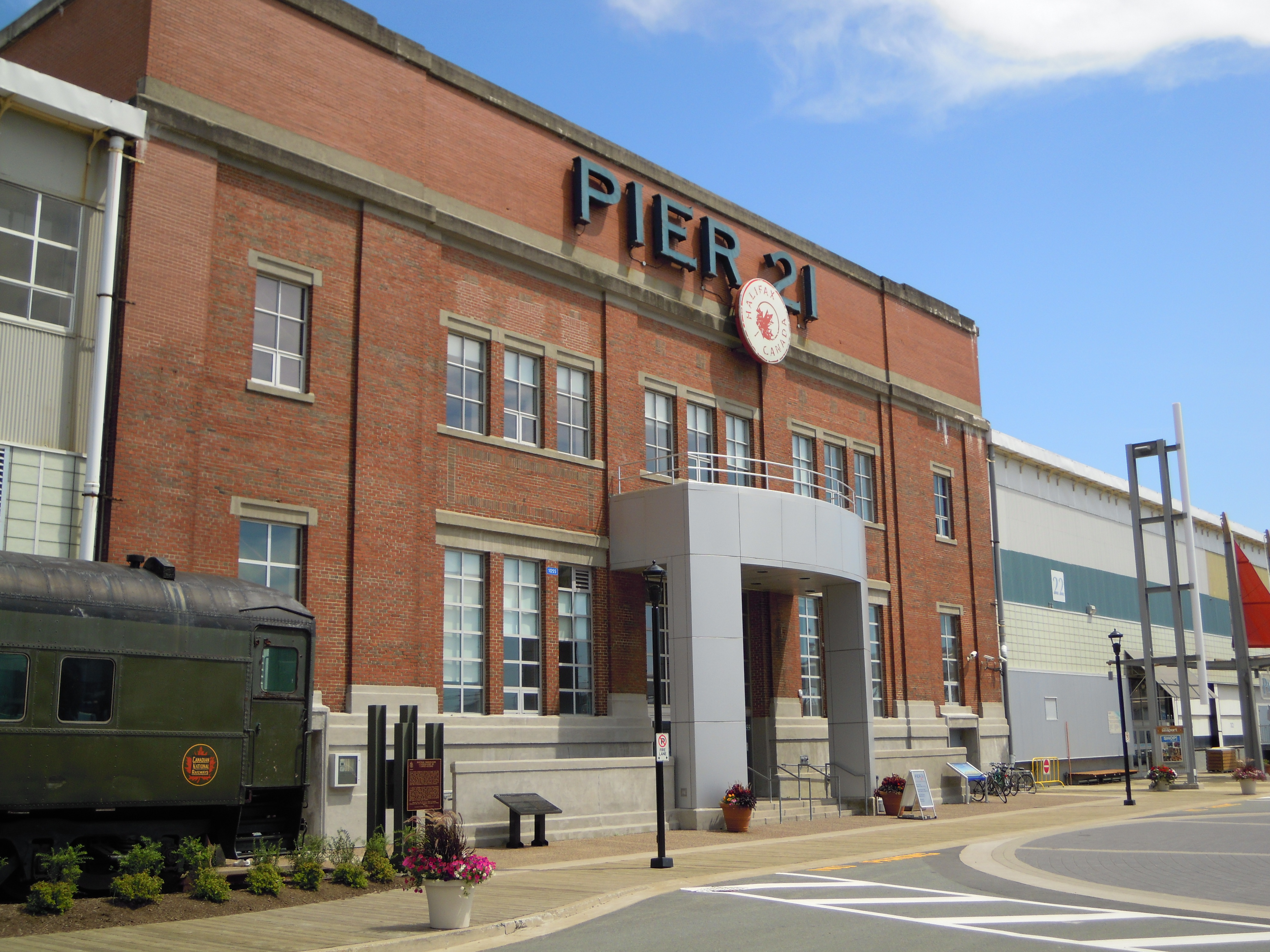
- Entrance to the Canadian Museum of Immigration at Pier 21 in 2010.
- Established: 1999
- Location: Halifax, Nova Scotia, Canada
- Type: Immigration Museum
- Owners: Pier 21 Society (1999–2011); Government of Canada (2011–present)
- Website: www.pier21.ca/

The Canadian Museum of Immigration at Pier 21 (French: Musée canadien de l'immigration du Quai 21), in Halifax, Nova Scotia, is Canada's national museum of immigration. The museum occupies part of Pier 21, the former ocean liner terminal and immigration shed from 1928 to 1971. Pier 21 is Canada's last remaining ocean immigration shed. The facility is often compared to Ellis Island (1892–1954), in terms of its importance to mid-20th-century immigration to Canada an association it shares with 19th century immigration history at Grosse Isle, Quebec (1832–1932) and Partridge Island in Saint John, New Brunswick (1785–1941). The museum began as an independent institution run by the Pier 21 Society in 1999. It became a national museum run by the Canadian federal government in 2011.

== History ==
The museum is located in the former Pier 21 immigration facility built in 1928 as part of the Ocean Terminals development in Halifax. The Pier played a crucial role in World War II and in the peak years of postwar immigration to Canada in the 1940s and 50s. Pier 21 closed as an immigration terminal in 1971. From the 1970s until 1991, Pier 21 housed the Nova Scotia Nautical Institute, a training facility for professional mariners. During the 1990s, the former immigration quarters provided studio and workshop space for artists. The ocean liner pier itself became increasingly used as the Halifax Port Authority's cruise ship dock. On September 22, 1997, the site was designated a National Historic Site by the Historic Sites and Monuments Board of Canada.

=== Pier 21 Society Museum ===
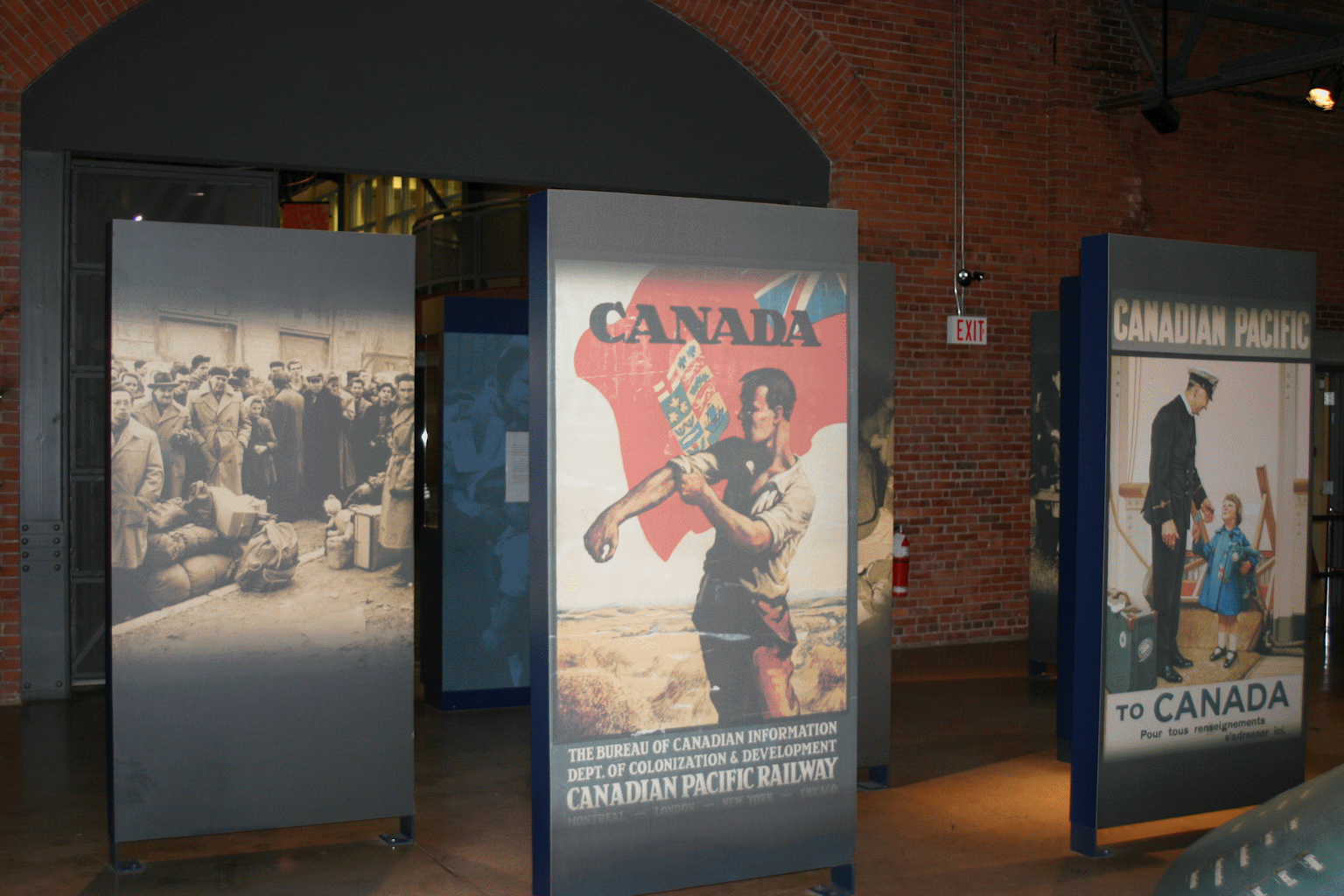
Part of the exhibition in 2007

In 1985, the Pier 21 Society was founded by J.P. LeBlanc to raise funds and renew the public's interest in the derelict shed, which was the last of its kind in Canada. Ruth Goldbloom became the organization's second president in 1993, and the push to turn the property into a National Historic Site and museum proceeded quickly. In cooperation with the Halifax Port Authority, Pier 21 was re-opened as a museum on Canada Day in 1999, and began its new role to celebrate the 1.5 million immigrants that passed through its doors.

=== National Museum ===
In 2009, the Government of Canada, the Pier 21 Society, the Pier 21 Foundation and the Halifax Port Authority agreed to partner in support of a new national museum at Pier 21. On June 25, 2009, Prime Minister Stephen Harper announced a Statement of Intentions to designate a National Museum of Immigration at Pier 21. Later that year, Pier 21 was chosen to compete in the Canadian Broadcasting Corporation's (CBC) "Seven Wonders of Canada" television show, placing out of the top seven places. As the sixth national museum in Canada—and only the second national museum outside of Canada's National Capital Region—Pier 21 joined Canada's five other national museums officially on February 7, 2011. The Museum was voted bronze for Best Museum by readers of The Coast from 2012 to 2015. Marie Chapman, the museum's chief executive officer, resigned in December 2025 after a report alleged that she mistreated staff and used "inappropriate language" throughout her tenure.

== Permanent exhibitions ==
=== The Pier 21 Story ===
The Pier 21 Story exhibition shows visitors what it was like to immigrate through Pier 21 between 1928 and 1971. Visitors can open replica children's trunks to see what five immigrant children might have brought with them to Canada, walk through a replica of the colonist train cars that newly arrived immigrants boarded for the next stage of their journey, and even dress up as some of the key staff and volunteers at Pier 21.

==== Exhibits ====
- Before Pier 21
- Why Halifax
- A Gateway to Canada
- The Transatlantic Voyage
- The Cabin
- Arrival
- Medical Facilities – Canadian Immigration Hospital
- What Pier 21 Means to Me
- Assembly Hall
- Bronfman Theatre
- Colonist Car
- Major Immigration Waves
- Pier 21 Memories Album
- People of the Pier

=== Canadian Immigration Hall ===
The Canadian Immigration Hall was created to tell the story of 400 years of immigration to Canada, from initial contact with First Nations peoples to the present day. A multimedia immigration map allows visitors to visualize migration trends. The BMO Oral History Gallery includes almost 200 oral histories that visitors can browse by theme. The exhibit is divided into four sections: Journey, Arrival, Belonging, and Impact.

=== Temporary exhibitions ===
Empress of Ireland: Canada's Titanic is a temporary exhibition from November 23, 2015, to November 13, 2016. It was created by the Canadian Museum of History and co-presented by the Canadian Museum of Immigration at Pier 21. The exhibit tells the story of the thousands of passengers who took the RMS Empress of Ireland to and from Canada and Great Britain and its subsequent maritime disaster on 29 May 1914 that saw it sink after a collision with the Norwegian collier SS Storstad.

=== Wall of Service ===
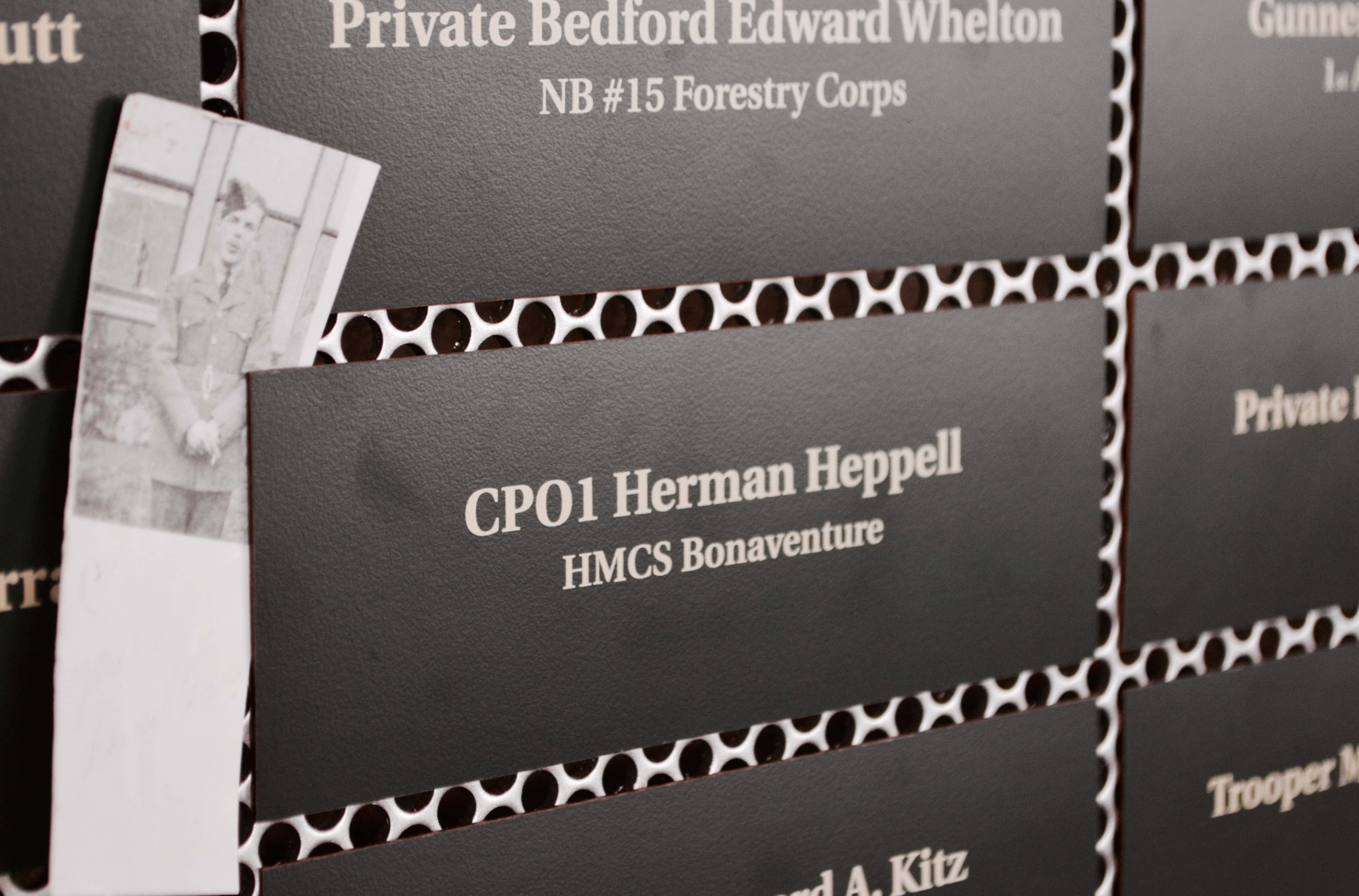
CP01 Herman Heppell, HMCS Bonaventure, on the Wall of Service

The Wall of Service commemorates Pier 21 as the departure point for over 500,000 Canadians during the Second World War. The wall recognizes the sacrifices of service personnel past and present, war brides, and individuals who have provided service at Pier 21. Bricks are purchased on behalf of a designate and displayed on the Canadian Museum of Immigration at Pier 21's WWII Deck as well as on the Virtual Wall of Service.

=== Sobey Wall of Honour ===
The Sobey Wall of Honour gives tribute to individuals who have chosen Canada as their home and have helped build Canada as a nation. It is supported by the Sobey Foundation. Bricks are purchased on behalf of a designate and displayed in the entrance to the Canadian Museum of Immigration at Pier 21.

=== Wadih M. Fares Wall of Tribute ===
The Wadih M. Fares Wall of Tribute recognizes community and cultural groups with a connection to Pier 21 and immigration to Canada. Bricks are purchased by community and cultural groups and displayed in the Hall of Tribute at the Canadian Museum of Immigration at Pier 21. The wall is named after Wadih M. Fares, an immigrant to Canada from Lebanon in 1976 and chair of the board at Pier 21 from 2007 to 2009.

== Collection ==
The Canadian Museum of Immigration at Pier 21 has both a physical artifact collection and a vast Oral History collection. Pier 21 currently holds 2,000 stories, 500 oral history interviews, 700 donated books, 300 films, and thousands of archival images and scans of immigration and WWII documents. Many of the resources can be found on the website and all can be accessed by contacting Pier 21's Scotiabank Family History Centre.

The Pier 21 story collection has broadened from those who actually passed through Pier 21's doors, to include stories about immigration from all points of entry from the early beginnings of Canada (including First Nations) and concentrating on all immigration from 1867 to the present. Pier 21 is collecting family histories that go back to 1867 and is eager to begin collecting stories from those that arrived after 1971. These stories will be among the raw materials used to create future exhibits.

Oral historians conduct oral history interviews onsite and occasionally in different centres across Canada. These interviews are vital to the museum's collection and its ongoing commitment to preserving and sharing stories of all Canadians.

The image collection includes thousands of scanned newspaper clippings, immigration related documents and ship memorabilia, as well as digital photos donated by individual families and organizations.

The museum actively collects donated personal and family stories on immigration to Canada to add to the museum's Story Collection.

=== MS St. Louis memorial ===
On January 20, 2011, a memorial sculpture, the "Wheel of Conscience", was displayed at Pier 21. It commemorated the German passenger liner MS St. Louis's 1939 voyage from Europe to North America. Over 900 Jewish passengers, fleeing the early stages of the Holocaust, were turned away as refugees from many North American ports; a quarter were murdered in the Holocaust. Designed by Daniel Libeskind with graphic design by David Berman and Trevor Johnston, it was produced by the Canadian Jewish Congress. The memorial is a polished stainless steel wheel. Symbolizing the hateful and racist policies that turned away more than 900 Jewish refugees, the wheel incorporates four gears of descending size named to represent the process that led to the denial of sanctuary – antisemitism, xenophobia, racism, and then hatred. On the back of the memorial is a list of the passengers aboard the MS St. Louis. After an initial display period, the sculpture was shipped to its fabricators, Soheil Mosun Limited, in Toronto for repair and refurbishment. As of the museum re-opening in the spring of 2015, the memorial is back in place in the main lobby of the Canadian Museum of Immigration at Pier 21.

== Programs and services ==
=== Research and genealogy services ===
The Scotiabank Family History Centre (SFHC), located on the main floor of the museum, houses a large, publicly available collection of non-circulating books, periodicals, and archival records related to the Pier 21 National Historic Site and the broader study of immigration in Canada, with a focus on the role that immigrants and their descendants have had in shaping Canadian life.

Pier 21's most important project is collecting the personal recollections of immigrants whether they arrived in the busy post-war years or yesterday.

==== Genealogy services ====
The SFHC offers a comprehensive range of genealogical services to patrons worldwide tracing their family histories from various countries of origin. While the SFHC is not a repository for historical records, it does have access to a multitude of resources to help visitors begin or continue their family history journey. Visitors can search for the basic arrival information of anyone arriving through a Canadian port between 1865 and 1935, and the records of individuals coming through Halifax, Quebec City, Montreal or Saint John between 1925 and 1935 can be accessed on microfilm.

On-site visitors can work with a staff member to explore and uncover historical documents with an emphasis on discovering an immigration record or their original immigrant ancestor. People can also put in research requests remotely via the Canadian Museum of Immigration at Pier 21 website.

=== Public programs ===
==== Artist-in-Residence program ====
The Canadian Museum of Immigration at Pier 21 hosts an annual Artist-in-Residence. The 2021 Artist-in-Residence is Aquil Virani, creating a collaborative art project called “Our Immigrant Stories” that invites the public to celebrate the immigrant heroes in their lives. The previous Artists-in-residence include: Katarina Marinic (2019), Shauna MacLeod (2018), Andrea Tsang Jackson (2017) and Kyle Jackson (2016).

==== Diversity Spotlight Film Series ====
The Diversity Spotlight Program is a partnership program with community organizations across Canada. It explores different themes related to immigration, cultural heritage, and multiculturalism. Film presentations range from documentaries to international films and are free for the public to attend.

==== Pier 21 Reads ====
Pier 21 Reads profiles Canadian authors whose work touches on immigration, either from their own experience, their point of view, or the stories of their characters. This program is offered in English or French (Le Quai 21 se raconte). The event is an opportunity for the public to meet with the authors and for the authors to present their work to a live audience.

The program started in September 2015 with the participation of Esi Edugyan, followed by Lawrence Hill in October 2015 and Kim Thúy in March 2016.

=== School programs ===
All school programs (tours and workshops) are available in French and English. Different programs explore the issues of immigration appropriate for different grade levels.

=== Celebrating citizenship ===
The Canadian Museum of Immigration at Pier 21 regularly hosts official citizenship ceremonies. Over the years, around 1000 immigrants have become new Canadians at the museum. In partnership with Immigration, Refugees and Citizenship Canada, a special Canada Day citizenship ceremony is organized every year.

=== Other services ===
The Canadian Museum of Immigration at Pier 21 also features a Café and a Museum Gift Shop. Souvenirs related to the museum and also from Nova Scotia can be found at the shop. Local crafts are also well represented.

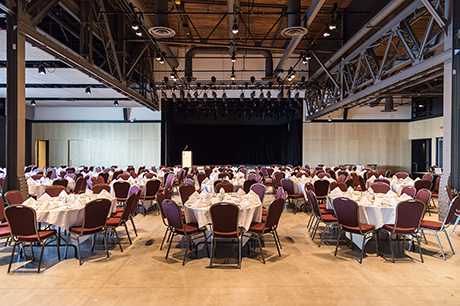
Kenneth Rowe Hall

Pier 21 went under renovation in 2015 and now offers new rental facilities. The museum's location attracts a variety of events, from weddings to conferences and corporate events, with over 200 events hosted each year.

== Mascot ==
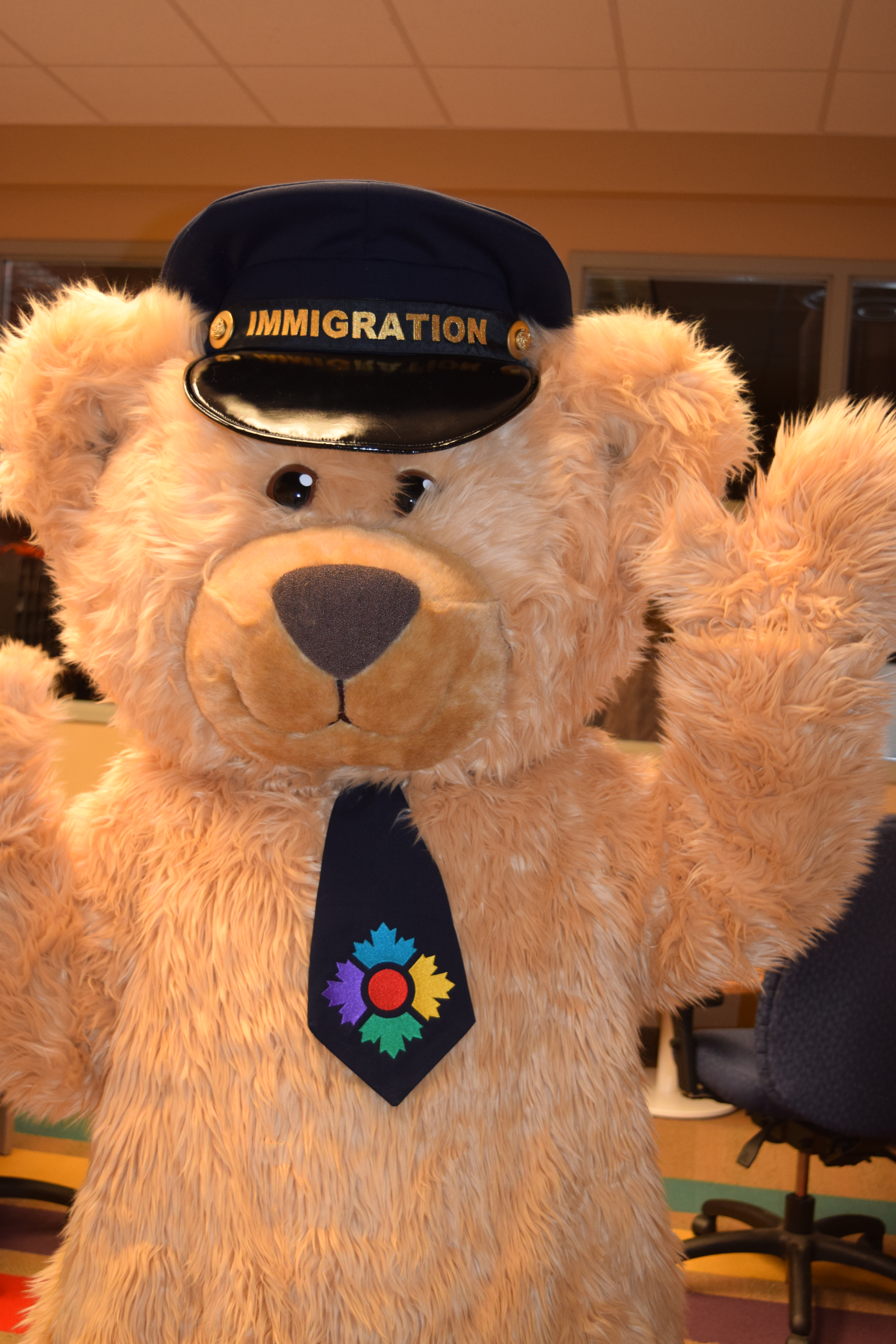
Fenton Bear, official mascot of the Canadian Museum of Immigration

Fenton Bear, the official mascot at the Canadian Museum of Immigration at Pier 21, made his first public appearance in spring of 2015. Fenton is an excellent dancer, and is the star of both Dance Off video contest entries. He was created as the focus of the museum's junior education program Teddy Bear's Journey, which explores the themes and challenges of immigration through the eyes of children and their stuffed animals. Fenton was named for Fenton Crossman, an immigration officer who worked at the Pier in its heyday. Now Fenton can be found greeting cruise ships, attending festivals on behalf of the museum, and surprising unsuspecting visitors.

== See also ==
- Eswyn Lyster – warbride author
