= Goldblum =

Goldblum (Yiddish: גאָלדבלום, Hebrew: גּוֹלְדְבְּלוּם) is a surname. Notable people with the surname include:

- Amiram Goldblum (born 1945), Israeli chemist and activist
- Isidore Goldblum (1863–1925), Polish Hebrew writer and bibliographer
- Jeff Goldblum (born 1952), American actor
- Peter Goldblum (born 1946), American psychologist, specialising in LGBTQ+ research

== See also ==
- Goldbloom (Anglicized form)
- Goldblatt
- Goldfeld (surname)
