= Ilya Dvorkin =

Russian-Israeli historian

Ilya Saulovich Dvorkin
- Илья Саулович Дворкин
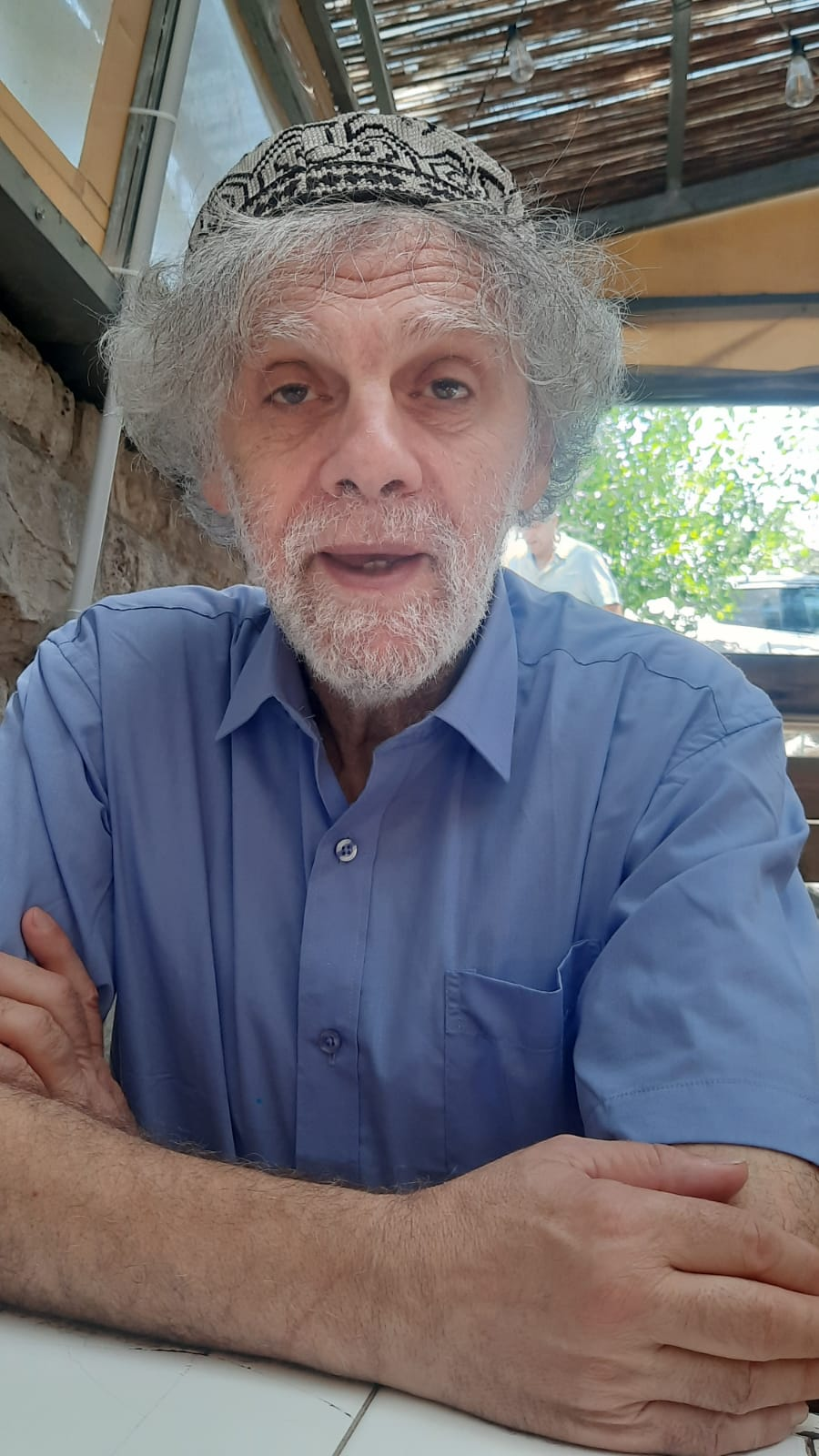
- Dvorkin in 2024
- Born: July 23, 1954 (age 72); Leningrad (now Saint Petersburg), USSR
- Citizenship: Soviet Union, Russia, Israel
- Education: Polytechnic Institute
- Known for: First rector and organizer of the St. Petersburg Institute of Jewish Studies
- Scientific career
- Fields: philology, history, Jewish studies
- Workplaces: Hebrew University of Jerusalem

Ilya Dvorkin (Russian: Илья Саулович Дворкин) is a Russian and Israeli historian, philologist and philosopher. He was the organizer and the first rector of St. Petersburg Institute of Jewish Studies from 1989 to 1997.

== Biography ==
Here's the English translation of the provided text about Ilya Dvorkin:

Ilya Dvorkin was born in 1954 in Leningrad, now Saint Petersburg. In 1981, he graduated from Северо-Западный государственный заочный технический университет (North-Western Open Technical University) and defended his diploma in logic and applied mathematics in the full-time department. Later, his sphere of interests shifted to philosophy and cultural history. In 1989, he became the organizer and rector of the Petersburg Jewish University (PJU), which revived the study and teaching of Judaica in Russia. He participated in numerous academic programs, including being a visiting researcher at Harvard University in 1995. In 1998, he completed his postgraduate studies without defending a dissertation at the Institute of Philosophy of the Russian Academy of Sciences on the topic "Hermeneutics of Maimonides".

Since 1998, he has been in Israel, teaching at the Hebrew University of Jerusalem. He was the coordinator for developing curricula for Jewish schools in the former Soviet Union (a joint project of the Hebrew University and the Israeli Ministry of Education), as well as a project for training teachers for Jewish schools (a joint project of the Hebrew University of Jerusalem and Moscow State University). He has also taught multiple times at the philosophy faculties of Moscow State University and Saint Petersburg State University. He is the head of the "Sambation" project and educational projects at the Chais Center of the Hebrew University, and has been involved in organizing international scientific conferences.

Ilya Dvorkin was born in 1954 in Leningrad (now Saint Petersburg). He graduated from the Polytechnic University there, where he specialized in theoretical physics and cybernetics, but later his interests shifted towards philosophy and history, especially Jewish studies. In 1989, he became the organizer and rector of the Petersburg Jewish University, which revived the study and teaching of Jewish studies in Russia. In 1994, he was a visiting professor at the Center for Jewish Studies at Harvard. In 1998, he completed his postgraduate studies on the philosophy of Maimonides at the Institute of Philosophy of the Russian Academy of Sciences. Since 1998, he has been in Israel, teaching at the Hebrew University of Jerusalem. He has also frequently taught at the philosophy faculties of Moscow State University and Saint Petersburg State University.

== Scientific activity ==
Here's an English translation of the additional information about Ilya Dvorkin:

Dvorkin defended his diploma thesis on "Reflexive Logical Method in the Analysis of Complex Systems" and published his first printed works on this topic in the 1980s. He studied under Vladimir Bibler, Georgy Shchedrovitsky, and Piama Gaidenko. He also engaged in Semiotics and was an active participant in the seminar on semiodynamics and other informal scientific associations. In 1982-83, he proposed a logical-semantic concept called "Arithmology". On June 9-12, 1982, an all-union seminar "Arithmological Aspects of Classiology" was held in Pushchino.

In the early 1980s, he began to intensively study Judaica and joined the Jewish cultural movement. He studied at the Yeshiva of Rabbi Adin Steinsaltz. From the mid-1980s, he began conducting ethnographic expeditions to study the vanished forms of Jewish life in the USSR.

In 1989, based on these expeditions and other scientific and educational projects, he organized the St. Petersburg Institute of Jewish Studies (PJU, Petersburg Jewish University), of which he was rector until 1998. The university became an important center for the study and teaching of Jewish studies, research of Jewish history, development of Jewish education, and formation of a new Jewish community. From 1990 to 1998, PJU, together with the Hebrew University of Jerusalem, conducted more than forty research expeditions in Belarus, Ukraine, Lithuania, Latvia, Uzbekistan, Georgia, and other countries. During these expeditions, many of which were conducted under the direct leadership of I. Dvorkin, more than 10,000 photographs and 300 hours of audio and video recordings were collected. One of the important research topics for I. Dvorkin during that period was the history of Bukharian Jews. However, philosophy remained his main area of research.

Later, he studied at the Hebrew University of Jerusalem.

In 1998, he prepared a dissertation on the philosophy of Maimonides at the Institute of Philosophy (Russian Academy of Sciences) in Moscow, but in the same year, he immigrated to Israel, where he worked at the Hebrew University in Jerusalem. He cites the philosophy of dialogue as his main philosophical specialty. He is the author of 9 books and 80 publications. Among them are such major works as the preparation of the academic edition of Franz Rosenzweig's main philosophical work "The Star of Redemption", which received high praise from specialists.

== Family ==
He is married with five children. He has a daughter from his first marriage.

=== Books ===
- Ilya Dvorkin (2022). Ilya Dvorkin (ed.). Anthology of Jewish Philosophy of Modern and Contemporary Times. Studies in Jewish Thought (in Russian). Moscow, Jerusalem: M. Greenberg Library; Knizhniki. p. 928. ISBN 978-5-905826-44-3.
- Ilya Dvorkin, Markiel Fazylov (2018). Popular History of Bukharian Jews. VK-2000. p. 320.
- Franz Rosenzweig (2017). I. Dvorkin (ed.). Man and Star. Biography of Franz Rosenzweig. In the book "The Star of Redemption" (in Russian). Translated by E. Yanduganova. Moscow: Mosty kultury/Gesharim. p. 544. ISBN 978-5-93273-445-2.
- I. Dvorkin (2010). Jewish shtetls, cities, communities in the perspective of personal and family history. Moscow.
- I. Dvorkin (2010). Jewish classical texts. The art of rereading. Moscow.
- I. Dvorkin (2010). Jewish culture in images, symbols and works of art. Moscow.
- I. Dvorkin (1999). The Dream of Rabbi Honi ha-M'agel. St. Petersburg - Jerusalem.
- I. Dvorkin (1998). This is the book of the generations of man. St. Petersburg: Petersburg Jewish University. ISBN 5879910504.
- Ilya Dvorkin, ed. (1996). The Leningrad Children's Haggadah. St. Petersburg: Petersburg Jewish University. p. 128.
- I. S. Dvorkin (1995). T. D. Vyshenskaya (ed.). Jews in Central Asia. Past and present: Expeditions, research, publications: Collection of scientific works. St. Petersburg: Petersburg Jewish University.

=== Articles ===
- Dvorkin, Ilya (2024). "I. The Interaction of Continental and Analytical Philosophy in the Development of the Philosophy of Dialogue". Philosophies. 9 (4): 127. doi:10.3390/philosophies9040127.
- Dvorkin, Ilya (2022). "Hidden Person Makes Dialogue Present: The Place of It in the System of Dialogue According to Cohen, Buber and Rosenzweig". Religions. 13 (6): 514. doi:10.3390/rel13060514.
- Dvorkin, Ilya (2022). "Rosenzweig and Bakhtin. Hermeneutics of Language and Verbal Art in the System of the Philosophy of Dialogue". RUDN Journal of Philosophy. 26 (3): 537–556. doi:10.22363/2313-2302-2022-26-3-537-556. ISSN 2313-2302.
- Dvorkin, Ilya (2021). "The Concept of Grammatical Organon in the Star of Redemption by Rosenzweig". Religions. 12 (11): 945. doi:10.3390/rel12110945.
- Dvorkin, Ilya (2021). "Kant's Concept of Space and Time in the Light of Modern Science". Studies in Transcendental Philosophy. 2 (2). doi:10.18254/S271326680016904-4. ISSN 2713-2668.
- Dvorkin, Ilya (2021). "Hermeneutics of Aristotle and Hermeneutics of Sophists in Terms of Dialogue Philosophy. Part 2". RUDN Journal of Philosophy. 25 (1): 103–120. doi:10.22363/2313-2302-2021-25-1-103-120.
- Dvorkin, Ilya (2020). "Hermeneutics of Aristotle and Hermeneutics of Sophists in Terms of Dialogue Philosophy. Part 1". RUDN Journal of Philosophy. 24 (3): 480–501. doi:10.22363/2313-2302-2020-24-3-480-501.
- Dvorkin, Ilya (2020). "Philosophy of dialog: a historical and systematic introduction". Judaica Petropolitana (13): 6–24.
- Dvorkin, Ilya (2019). Hermann Cohen and the Philosophy of Dialogue. Proceedings of the 4th International Conference on Contemporary Education, Social Sciences and Humanities. Vol. 329. Atlantis Press. doi:10.2991/iccessh-19.2019.39. ISSN 2352-5398.
- Dvorkin, I. (2019). "Jewish philosophy as a Direction of the World philosophy of Modern and Contemporary Times". RUDN Journal of Philosophy. 23 (4): 430–442. doi:10.22363/2313-2302-2019-23-4-430-442.
- Dvorkin, I.S. (2016). "FIRE AND RAYS. PHILOSOPHY OF JUDAISM AND CHRISTIANITY IN F. ROSENZWEIG'S "STAR OF REDEMPTION"". Judaica Petropolitana (6). ISSN 2307-9053.
- Dvorkin, I. (2018). "From Correlation to Gestalt. Cohen's and Rosenzweig's Foundations of Dialogue Philosophy". Filosofia. Rivista annuale Quarta Serie (63). Milan: Mimesis: 97–106. doi:10.13135/2704-8195/3794.
- Dvorkin, Ilya (2016). "Analytical Introduction to the Philosophy of Dialogue". Metaphysics. Scientific Journal. 22 (4): 8–27.
- Dvorkin, I.S. (2013). "Being and Existing. Overcoming Metaphysics in Cohen, Heidegger and Levinas". Judaica Petropolitana (1): 155–173.
- Akhiezer, Golda; Dvorkin, Ilya (2004). "Tombstone Inscriptions from the Karaite Cemeteries in Lithuania". Pe'amim: Studies in Oriental Jewry (in Hebrew). 4 (98/99): 225–260.
- Dvorkin, I.S. (2001). "Maimonides". New Philosophical Encyclopedia (in Russian). Vol. 4.
