= Naḥman Isaac Fischmann =

Galician Hebrew-language writer, dramatist, poet and editor

- Born: c. 1809; Lemberg, Galicia, Austrian Empire
- Died: 1873; Lemberg, Galicia, Austria-Hungary
- Writing career
- Language: Hebrew

Naḥman Isaac Fischmann (Hebrew: נחמן יצחק הכהן פישמאן; c. 1809–1873), also known by the pen name Ha-nif ha-kohen mi-Lvov (Hebrew: הני״ף הכהן מלבוב), was a Galician Hebrew-language writer, dramatist, poet, and editor.

He was a member of the young Haskalah group in Lemberg, best known for his Biblical dramas Mapelet Sisra (1841) and Kesher Shevna (1870). Along with Jacob Bodek, Abraham Menahem Mendel Mohr, and Jacob Mentsch, he published the controversial magazine Ha-roʼeh u-mevaḳer (Lemberg and Ofen, 1837–39), which attacked the philological and archaeological works of Samuel David Luzzatto, Isaac Samuel Reggio, and especially Solomon Judah Loeb Rapoport.

Fischmann's other publications include Eshkol ʻanavim, a collection of original Hebrew poems and translations (Lemberg, 1827), Safah le-ne'emanim, a comprehensive commentary on Job (Lemberg, 1854), and the poem Ha-et ve-ha-meshorer (Lemberg, 1870). He was also a contributor to the literary publications Bikkure ha-Ittim and Yerushalayim ha-benuya.

== Bibliography ==
- Eshkol ʻanavim: shirim [A Bunch of Grapes: Poems]. Lemberg: Gedruckt bei F. Grossman. 1827. hdl:2027/hvd.hwnmph.
- Ha-roʼeh u-mevaḳer [The Seer and the Searcher]. Grosman, Affen, Berger. 1837. hdl:2027/uc1.aa0012080677.
- Mapelet Sisra: Der Sturz Sisera's, oder die Befreiung Israels Durch Barak und Deborah [The Fall of Sisera]. Lemberg: Gedruckt bei Chawe Grosman. 1841.
- Safah le-ne'emanim [Language for the Faithful]. Śafah le-neʾemanim. Lemberg: Gedruckt bei F. Grossman. 1854. hdl:2027/hvd.hwnmh2.
- Kesher Shevna. Lemberg: Verlag von S. Stricks & J. Rohatin. 1870. hdl:2027/uc1.$b387188.
- Ha-et ve-ha-meshorer [The Pen and the Poet]. Lemberg: Verlag von J. Rohatin. 1870.
