= Aquil Virani =

Canadian artist

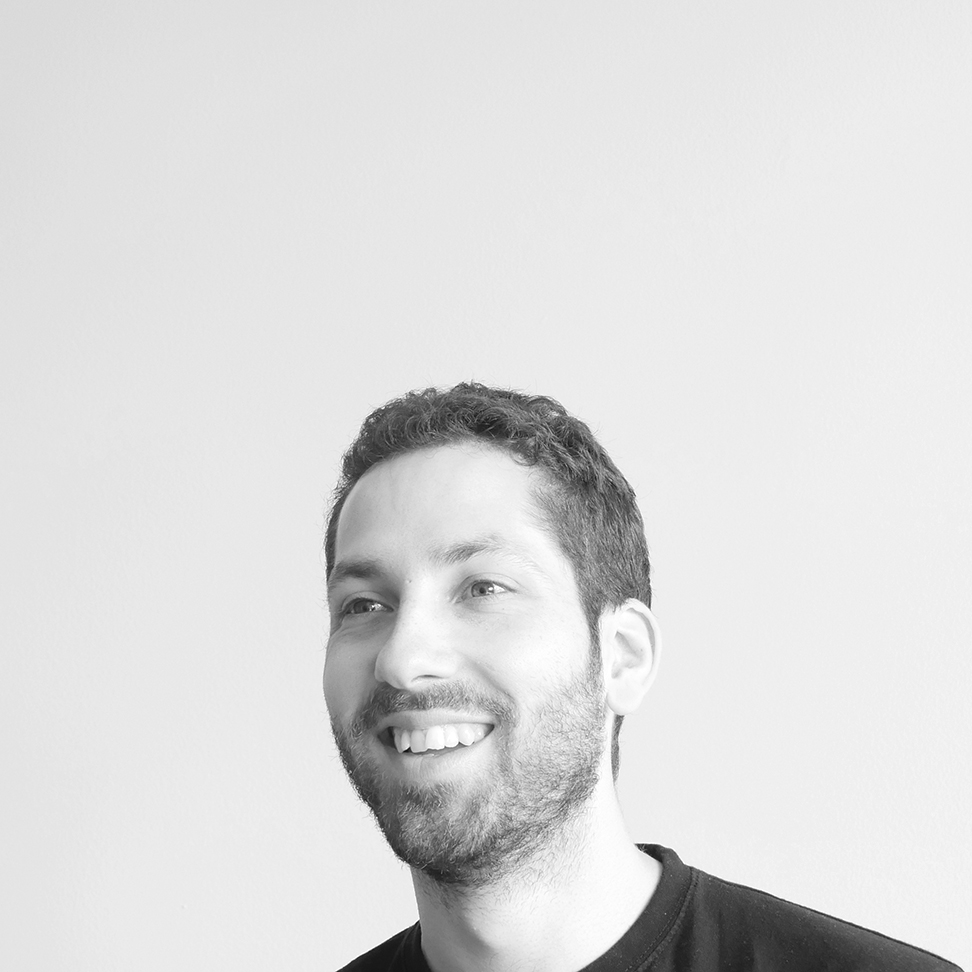
- Virani in 2019
- Born: Surrey, British Columbia, Canada
- Education: Bachelor of Arts, McGill University
- Occupation: Artist
- Website: aquil.ca

Aquil Virani is a Canadian artist, who was born in British Columbia and is currently based in Toronto. He is best known for his community-engaged art projects that explore social issues and often combine public participation and figurative portraiture. His work includes painting, graphic design, illustration, filmmaking, writing and participatory art events.

== Early life ==
Virani grew up in Surrey, British Columbia to immigrant parents and is the youngest of four sons. His mother was born in France, and his father is a Ismaili Muslim of Indian heritage who was born and raised in East Africa, immigrating to Canada from Tanzania. Virani graduated from Southridge Secondary School in 2008, before completing his undergraduate degree at McGill University and graduated with a Bachelor of Arts in Philosophy and Marketing after first studying math and physics. Virani is a self-taught artist and worked at L’Oréal Canada for several years, while moonlighting as an artist, before becoming self-employed in 2014.

== Career ==
In 2012, Virani had a solo art exhibit at McGill University, entitled "Copycat", where he combined hundreds of participant drawings that were reproduced ‘live’ onto a collaborative painting over the course of different events.

In 2014, Virani and Rebecca Jones traveled across Canada to collect stories and drawings for a project entitled "Canada's Self Portrait." The project was partially crowdfunded and received over 800 responses. It was later exhibited at the Galerie Mile End in Montreal and the Canadian Museum of Immigration at Pier 21 in Halifax.

For his 24th birthday, Virani created 24 original works of art in the 24 hours leading up to his birthday.

In 2017, Virani received a grant from the Silk Road Institute's Combating Hate, Advancing Inclusion (CHAI) digital video arts initiative for his project, "Postering Peace". In 2017, at a Montreal vigil in the aftermath of the Quebec City mosque shooting, Virani also had attendees contribute to a "live painting", where they could write messages over his depiction of Muslim hands in prayer. The painting was sent as a gift to the Islamic cultural centre in Sainte-Foy.

In 2017, Virani started a series of portraits of inspiring women for his "CelebrateHer" project, which included portraits of Kwanlin Dün First Nation Chief Doris Bill as well as Ta'an Kwäch'än Council Chief Kristina Kane. The project was unveiled in a series of art exhibits in Montreal, including one at McGill University.

In 2018, Virani won the "Artist for Peace" Award. Later that year, in Copenhagen, Virani worked with a community centre called "Trampoline House" to develop materials for a petition campaign for asylum-seeking children.

In 2020, Virani received a $5,000 Canada Council Digital Originals grant.

For his 30th birthday in 2021, Virani mailed 30 letters to people who had inspired him in some way for his “30 letters” project, which was the focus of an episode of The Doc Project. This included his childhood martial arts instructor, a friend's mother, Roberto Luongo, Ron Maclean, Kent Monkman, among others. He received responses from "about a dozen" people.

In 2021, he designed and produced a bilingual art anthology of Ottawa-based Muslim artists and writers called “Ottawa Inshallah” with the theme, “Ottawa Inshallah: Dreaming of a better future” with financial support from the City of Ottawa.

In 2021, he was also named “Artist-in-Residence” at the Canadian Museum of Immigration at Pier 21. At the end of his residency at the museum in 2022, he unveiled a collaborative animated film, a series of six participatory visual artworks, and a book compiling 100 immigrant stories submitted from participants across the country.

In 2022, Virani also unveiled six commemorative portraits of the victims of the Quebec City mosque shooting, created in accordance with the wishes of the victims’ families. The artworks, measuring 30 x 65 inches each, were shipped to the Centre Culturel Islamique de Québec to be exhibited for the 5th anniversary commemoration of the attack on January 29, 2022, before being gifted directly to the families.

In 2023, Virani presented the “50 Years of Migration” exhibition that debuted at the Aga Khan Museum. The travelling exhibition integrates family photographs, first-hand accounts, historical documents, and personal interviews with Canadian Ismaili Muslims from Uganda, Afghanistan, Syria, Tajikistan, India, Pakistan and beyond. According to an interview published on the museum’s website, Virani’s goal is to "showcase the courage and resilience of the countless Ismaili Muslims who fled their homelands in search of refuge.” He says he "spent hundreds of hours over several months researching, writing, gathering, corresponding, interviewing, editing, photo editing, designing panels, editing text, and producing the audio play [...] in service to the community.” The exhibition was presented in Vancouver, Toronto, Brampton, Kitchener, Pickering, Edmonton, Calgary, Brossard and Ottawa at the Delegation of the Ismaili Imamat, with various political figures like NDP Leader Jagmeet Singh, Brampton Mayor Patrick Brown, and Senator Mobina Jaffer attending different local launch events, including one event co-hosted by the Vancouver Art Gallery.

Later in 2023, in a separate project, he collaborated with the Royal Ontario Museum and curator Justin Jennings on a collaborative art project titled “Things will get better” where he "integrated hundreds of these sticky notes into a multimedia artwork, commemorating our collective early pandemic experiences and amplifying the diverse voices of participating community members."

In 2024, Virani was invited to give an artist talk at Queen's University for the National Day of Remembrance to Honour the Victims of the Quebec City Mosque Attack. In April, he also created a collaborative artwork using picket signs from the OPSEU Local 535 strike by workers of the Art Gallery of Ontario. His intention is to gift the artwork to the workers. For this project, Virani won the "Labour Creative Maverick Award" from the Mayworks Festival of Working People and the Arts.

In 2025, the Senate of Canada exhibited Virani's artwork, "Canada's Self Portrait," created in collaboration with Rebecca Jones, marking the 60th anniversary of the National Flag of Canada as part of the "Visual Voices" exhibition program.

== Personal life ==
Virani is an Ismaili Muslim. He also identifies as a feminist.
