= Meshulam Zalman Goldbaum =

Galician Hebrew poet and playwright

- Born: Moshe Goldbaum; 1 January 1836; Lvov, Austria-Hungary
- Died: 2 November 1915 (aged 79); Prague, Kingdom of Bohemia
- Writing career
- Language: Hebrew
- Literary movement: Haskalah

Meshulam Zalman Goldbaum (Hebrew: משולם זלמן גולדבוים, romanized: Meshulam Zalman Goldboym; 1 January 1836 – 2 November 1915) was a Galician Hebrew poet and playwright.

== Biography ==
Goldbaum was born in Lvov, where he was raised among Maskilim. He began writing poems at a young age, the earliest of which were published in Naḥman Isaac Fischmann's Safah la-ne’emanim in 1854. He received a letter of thanks from Napoleon III for an occasional poem celebrating the Treaty of Paris.

In 1857 he moved to Iași, where he founded a school for Jewish children. While there he published articles in German and French on the rights of Romanian Jews. He was an active Freemason, and published a tragedy inspired by the Masonic movement, Yedidya ha-Isi (Iași, 1873).

After thirty years as an educator in Romania, he returned in 1888 to his hometown. He continued publishing poetry, some of which he collected in his book Sefer ha-shirim (Lviv, 1887). He lived his final years in solitude, and died in Prague as a refugee of the First World War in November 1915.

== Publications ==
- Yedidya ha-Isi ben Shim'on ben Shetaḥ [Jedediah the Essene] (Tragedy). Jassy: J. Goldenbaum. 1873.
- Sefer ha-shirim [The Book of Poems]. Vol. 1. Lemberg: E. Salat. 1910.
- Sefer ha-shirim [The Book of Poems]. Vol. 2. Lemberg: E. Salat. 1915.
