= David Goldbloom =

Canadian psychiatrist (born 1953)

Professor David Goldbloom OC FRCPC
- Born: Montreal, Quebec, Canada
- Education: Harvard University and McGill University
- Occupation: Senior Medical Advisor
- Employer(s): Centre for Addiction and Mental Health
- Organization(s): CAMH and Jack.org
- Board member of: Board Member of Jack.org
- Awards: Department of Psychiatry's Robin Hunter Award (2000); Council Award of Ontario College of Physicians and Surgeons (2001); Distinguished Fellow of Canadian Psychiatric Association and American Psychiatric Association (2005); Henry Durost Award University of Toronto (2005); Queen Elizabeth II Diamond Jubilee Medal (2012)
- Honours: Officer of the Order of Canada (2014) Family Physicians Honour Roll – Honorary Member (2016)

David Goldbloom (born 1953) is a retired Canadian psychiatrist, Professor Emeritus of Psychiatry at the University of Toronto, author, lecturer and mental health advocate. He most recently served from 2003-2022 as the Senior Medical Advisor of the Centre for Addiction and Mental Health (CAMH) and a psychiatric consultant. He has provided over many years lectures to students, colleagues, and the general public. Goldbloom has received various awards and recognition for his work in Psychiatry and is an honorary member of The College of Family Physicians of Canada.

== Early life and education ==
Goldbloom is the son of Ruth Goldbloom and Richard Goldbloom, born in Montreal in 1953 and raised in Quebec and Nova Scotia. He was educated at St. George's School and Lower Canada College in Montreal, the Halifax Grammar School in Halifax, and Neuchâtel Junior College in Switzerland. He attended Harvard University and obtained an honours undergraduate degree, majoring in Government. He later entered the University of Oxford as a Rhodes Scholar and completed an M.A. in Physiological Sciences. He then went on to train and study medicine and psychiatry at McGill University earning his MD and his specialist certificate in psychiatry. He completed 3 years as a Medical Research Council Centennial Fellow in the Program for Eating Disorders at The Toronto Hospital.

== Career ==
He became a staff psychiatrist at The Toronto Hospital following his fellowship; he worked in the psychiatry inpatient unit and led outpatient schizophrenia clinics. From 1989 - 1993, he directed the psychiatry fellowship training program at the University of Toronto. He then became the head of the new Division of General Psychiatry within the Department of Psychiatry at the University of Toronto.

In 1995 he became the Vice President of Medical Affairs and Chief of Staff at the Clarke Institute of Psychiatry and in 1998 was appointed as the inaugural Physician-in-Chief of the newly created Centre for Addiction and Mental Health (CAMH), resulting from the merger of the Clarke Institute of Psychiatry, The Donwood Institute, the Addiction Research Foundation, and Queen Street Mental Health Centre. His term ended in 2003 and he was then appointed Senior Medical Advisor. Goldbloom continues to lecture locally and nationally.

== Charitable work ==
Goldbloom has been involved in mental health advocacy and has sat on the board of directors for many mental health organizations. He served as vice-chair and then chair of the board of the Mental Health Commission of Canada from 2007–2015. He previously served on the board of the Canadian Mental Health Association Metro Toronto, Canada's largest community mental health agency, as well as on the board of the CAMH Foundation from 2003-2022. He also served on the board of directors of Jack.org, a national youth-led mental health organization focused on changing the way young people think about mental health, and the board of directors of the Graham Boeckh Foundation, a private family foundation in Montreal focused on catalyzing transformation of youth mental health services. He currently serves on the board of the Daymark Foundation, a private family foundation focused on bipolar disorder and peripartum mental health. P

Beyond his mental health work, he is a member of the Board of Trustees of the Canadian Museum of Immigration at Pier 21. He has also chaired the Board of Governors of the Stratford Shakespeare Festival of Canada as well as chairing the Board of Directors of The Off Centre Music Salon, a professional chamber music ensemble. He also served on the Board of Directors of the Glenn Gould Foundation and the Royal Conservatory of Music.

== Publications ==
Goldbloom has published numerous scientific articles and books and is the editor of two psychiatric textbooks titled Psychiatric Clinical Skills and Psychiatry in Primary Care: A Concise Canadian Pocket Guide. His best-selling book which he co-authored with Pier Bryden, titled "How Can I Help? A Week in My Life as a Psychiatrist", has provided reading material for students, professionals and public audiences to aid in the understanding of Canada's mental healthcare system and the work of a mental health professional. It has been translated into French and Mandarin. His book, "We Can Do Better: Urgent Innovations to Improve Mental Health Access and Care", was published by Simon & Schuster in 2021. His latest book, "Finding Ellen: The Remarkable Life of Ellen Ballon, Canadian Concert Pianist" will be published in 2027 by At Bay Press.

He has frequently appeared in print media, radio, television, and online to provide public education around mental illness.

== Awards and recognition ==
Goldbloom has received various awards and recognition for his exceptional professional work in psychiatry and charitable work in mental health:

- Recipient of The Department of Psychiatry's Robin Hunter Award for excellence in postgraduate education University of Toronto 2000
- Awarded The Council Award of the Ontario College of Physicians and Surgeons 2001
- Elected as a Distinguished Fellow of Canadian Psychiatric Association and American Psychiatric Association 2005
- Awarded The Henry Durost Award for Excellence in Creative Professional Activity from the Department of Psychiatry at the University of Toronto 2005
- Recipient of The Queen Elizabeth II Diamond Jubilee Medal 2012
- Appointed as an Officer of the Order of Canada2014
- Inducted into the Family Physicians Honour Roll (Honorary Membership) 2016
