= October 2012 Yisraela Goldblum Fund poll =

In mid-September 2012 a poll surveying Israeli attitudes was commissioned by the Yisraela Goldblum Fund and conducted on the eve of Rosh Hashanah by the polling agency Dialog, The results were first presented to the public by Haaretz journalist Gideon Levy on October 23, 2012, under the headline:'Survey: Most Israeli Jews would support apartheid regime in Israel.' In the wake of a controversy, Haaretz emended this to 'Survey: Most Israeli Jews wouldn't give Palestinians vote if West Bank was annexed', stating that the original headline 'did not accurately reflect the findings of the Dialog poll'. According to Haaretz, in the poll, 58% of respondents said Israel practiced apartheid against the Palestinians, and a third said Israeli Arabs should be denied the vote in Israel. Both the poll and Haaretz's presentation of its results have been challenged.

Deustche Welle described the poll as "set[ting] off a storm of reactions across" Israel.

== Polling agency ==
Dialog is run by Prof. Camil Fuchs, Haaretz's in-house pollster, and head of the Department of Statistics at Tel Aviv University's School of Mathematical Sciences. According to Haaretz, the questionnaire was written by a group of academic, peace, political and civil rights activists. The group consisted of the former director general of the Foreign Ministry and Israel ambassador to Turkey Alon Liel, who is married to New Israel Fund Israel's Executive Director Rachel Liel; former ambassador to South Africa Ilan Baruch, member of the New Israel Fund International Council; former chief of education in the IDF Mordechai Bar-On, member of the New Israel Fund International Council; and human rights lawyer Michael Sfard, legal counsel to several recipients of grants from the New Israel Fund, including Yesh Din, Breaking the Silence, Sheikh Jarrah Solidarity Movement.

The questionnaire consisted of 17 questions put to a sampling group of 503 interviewees, differentiated in terms of secular, traditional, religious, ultra-Orthodox and Russian. The margin of error was 4.3 Though originally reported as connected to the poll, the New Israel Fund quickly dissociated itself from the survey.

The poll results were first published in Haaretz by Gideon Levy, initially with the following headline:’ Survey: Most Israeli Jews would support apartheid regime in Israel.’ Levy’s presentation stirred headlines round the world, and was repeated or taken up rapidly by several newspapers that same day, including The Independent, Sydney Morning Herald the Daily Telegraph, and the Christian Science Monitor. AFP excluded the word ‘apartheid’ and headlined its report ‘Israelis approve discrimination if West Bank is annexed’.

== Gideon Levy's presentation ==
Levy made the following points:-

- (1) A 59% majority of the Jewish public wants preference for Jews over Arabs in government ministries.
- (2) 49%, almost half, desire better treatment by the state for its Jewish, as opposed to its Arab, citizens
- (3) 42% preferred not to live in the same building with Arabs.
- (4) 42% preferred not to have their children share school classes with Arab children
- (5) A third of the Jewish public wants a law that would block Israeli Arabs from voting for the Knesset (the Israeli parliament).
- (6) 69% object, in the event that Israel was to annex the West Bank, to giving the 2.5 million Palestinian residents there the right to vote.
- (7) 74% approve of a separate road system in the West Bank for Israelis and Palestinians.
- (8) 24% regard separate roads as "a good situation" vs. 50% who consider them "a necessary situation.”
- (9) 47% percent want part of Israel's Arab population transferred to the Palestinian National Authority.
- (10) 36% support the transference of authority of some Israeli Arab villages to the rule of the PA, in exchange for keeping some of the West Bank settlements.
- (11) 58% of the Jewish population believe Israel practices apartheid against Arabs, even before any annexation takes place in the West Bank.
- (12) 31% believe that this racial segregative regime does not exist in Israel-
- (13) 38% wish, and 48% object to, the annexation of areas in the West Bank with Jewish Settlements.

Analyzing the results according to sectoral segmentation, Levy gave the following breakdown of the poll results:-

Ultra Orthodox Israelis:-

- (14) 70% of the ultra-Orthodox support legally barring Israeli Arabs from voting.
- (15) 82% support state treatment in favor of Jews.
- (16) 95% are in favor of discrimination when deciding to accept Arabs or Jews for employment.

(Non ultra-orthodox) religious Israelis:-

- (17) This group, is second to the ultra-orthodox, in its racism.

Secular Israelis:-

- (18) This group is the least racist:
- (19) 68% of secular Israelis would not object to Arab neighbors,
- (20) 73% percent would not object to Arab students in their children's classes.
- (21) 50% think there should be no discrimination against Arabs in admissions to a workplace.

Russian immigrants are less radical, and closer to the secular Israelis in their outlook.

In a companion op-ed, Levy wrote he expected that the New Israel Fund, which has links to the Yisraeli Goldblum foundation, would be attacked for commissioning the survey. Levy noted that the results stated what Israelis already knew.

== Responses ==
That afternoon HonestReporting gave a detailed critique of what it called Levy’s skewing of the poll data. On October 23, the Times of Israel also reported on problems with the poll.

Haaretz reported that the survey conductors said that perhaps the term "apartheid" was not clear enough to some interviewees. Later in a press release Amiram Goldblum, who commissioned the poll stood by Haaretz’s version, stating that “A large part of the Jewish population (58%) accepts the application of the term ‘apartheid’ to the current state of affairs in Israel.” Goldblum also acknowledged there were problems with the questions and methodology used.

Meretz leader Zehava Gal-On said that “It is not surprising that following four years of Netanyahu’s government, most Israeli citizens support apartheid”, and Jamal Zahalka, leader of Balad, said that Israel belonged to "the same family" as South Africa's apartheid regime.

The conductors of the survey and critics of the poll suggested it was unclear what respondents understood with "apartheid", and that since a plurality of respondents opposed annexing the West Bank, it shouldn't be concluded that most Israelis support apartheid. Some critics said a question in the poll on apartheid was complex and problematically formulated.

Maurice Ostroff, a past chairman of the Israel South Africa Chamber of Commerce and a pro-Israel commentator, said that the results of the poll reveals that a vast majority of Israelis are not racists, and that the level of racism in Israel is lower than in most Western countries and in the Arab world. He cited an Amnesty International study titled “Choice and prejudice – discrimination against Muslims in Europe”, which found that public opinion in several European countries reflects Islamophobic views combined with racist attitudes. Another poll, he wrote, found that three-quarters of Qataris would object to a non-Muslim neighbor.
