= Alexander Kobrinsky =

Russian opposition politician

- Александр Кобринский
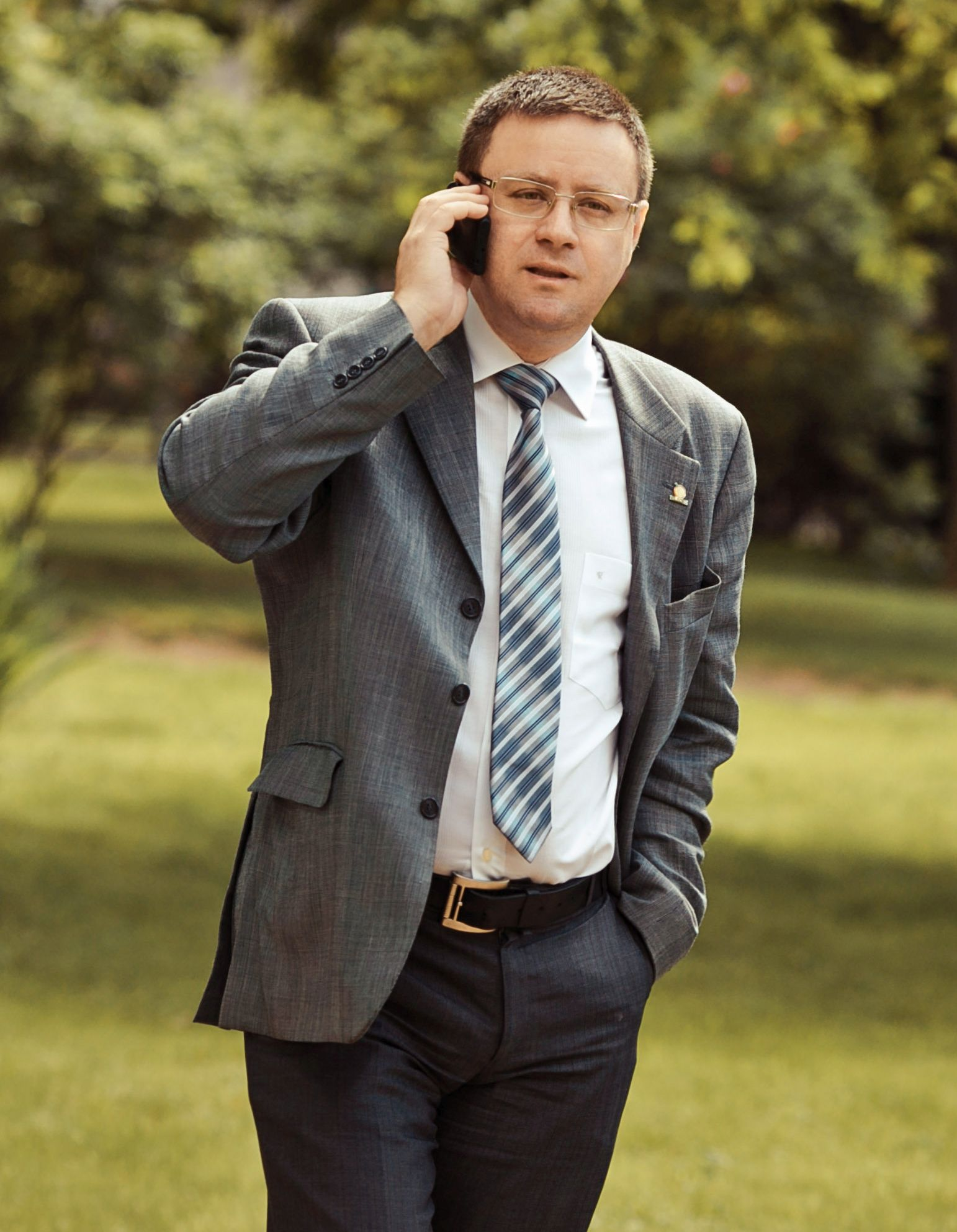
- Kobrinsky in 2016
- Born: March 20, 1967; Leningrad, Soviet Union
- Citizenship: USSR, Russia
- Education: Herzen University, Doctor of Sciences
- Political party: Yabloko
- Scientific career
- Fields: Philology
- Workplaces: Herzen University, professor (until 2019); St. Petersburg Institute of Jewish Studies

Alexander Arkadyevich Kobrinsky (Russian: Алекса́ндр Арка́дьевич Ко́бринский, born March 20, 1967) is a Russian literary critic, opposition politician and lawyer. Doctor of Philology, professor. Ex-deputy of the Legislative Assembly of Saint Petersburg of the 5th convocation (2011–2016), assistant to the deputy of the Legislative Assembly of Saint Petersburg Boris Vishnevskiy (since 2016).

== Biography ==
Kobrinsky is a graduate of Herzen University in Saint Petersburg, Russia. In 1992 he defended his Ph.D. thesis "Prose of Daniil Kharms", in 1999 – his doctoral dissertation "OBERIU Poetics in the Context of the Russian Literary Avant-Garde of the 20th Century". Trained at Hebrew University of Jerusalem (1997-1998), participant of the Fulbright program (2001-2002, University of Wisconsin–Madison, USA). Kobrinsky worked as a professor at the Department of Russian Literature of the Herzen University. In 2019, he resigned from the Herzen University after submitting anonymous complaints to the university management.

Specialist in the Russian avant-garde. Managing editor of the scientific journal "Summer School on Russian Literature", published by the St. Petersburg Institute of Jewish Studies.

In 2011 he graduated from the Faculty of Law of the Herzen University, although he began his human rights and legal activities much earlier. Lawyer at the Institute of Russian Literature of the Russian Academy of Sciences (Pushkin House).

=== Political activity ===
In 2006, Kobrinsky appealed to the Supreme Court of Russia with a demand to recognize the illegal forced evacuation of cars and their placement in a car impound in case of violation of traffic rules by drivers. The process was lost, but Kobrinsky continued to defend the rights of motorists, fighting against illegal requisitions, road "traps", demanding compensation harm to those illegally deprived of a driver's license.

In 2007, he was a candidate for deputy of the Legislative Assembly of Saint Petersburg on the list of the party of the Russian Democratic Party Yabloko. Together with the entire list of the party, he was not admitted to the elections.

In 2009, Kobrinsky went to court to lift the ban on the entry of cars to Kamenny Islands (this place is known for its super-expensive real estate and government dachas). The court denied the claim.

In March 2010, he signed the appeal of the Russian opposition "Putin Must Go" campaign. In March 2011, among 45 representatives of the Russian intelligentsia, he signed an appeal to Amnesty International with a request to recognize Mikhail Khodorkovsky and Platon Lebedev as prisoners of conscience.

The most important area of human rights activities of Alexander Kobrinsky was the protection of the rights of protesters. Kobrinsky constantly defends in courts those detained at rallies and pickets, and also provides other legal assistance to victims of the actions of the authorities. Kobrinsky consistently fought against restrictions on the rights of citizens to hold public events and himself acted as one of the organizers of rallies on this topic.

Kobrinsky was a member of the federal bureau of the Yabloko party. In December 2011, he was elected to the Legislative Assembly of Saint Petersburg of the 5th convocation (2011–2016) on the regional list of the Yabloko party. In 2020, he was nominated by the Yabloko party as a candidate for the by-elections of a deputy of the legislative assembly of Saint Petersburg. However, the elections were canceled due to the COVID-19 pandemic.

In July 2011, together with Boris Vishnevsky, he wrote a response to an appeal by a group of figures close to Right Cause, “There is a Choice,” titled “It’s time to choose good!”, in which he sharply condemned the authors’ attempt to rely on Dmitry Medvedev as an alternative to Vladimir Putin. In October 2011, he signed a statement “Khodorkovsky must go out [from a prison], and Putin and his team must go away”.

In December 2011, he was elected to the Legislative Assembly of Saint Petersburg of the 5th convocation on the regional list of the Russian Democratic Party Yabloko.

In 2012, Alexander Kobrinsky sharply opposed the law “On propaganda of homosexuality” proposed by Vitaly Milonov (was adopted) and against the law banning abortion. Subsequently, in 2013, Kobrinsky, together with Vishnevsky, introduced a bill to repeal the law "On propaganda of homosexuality", as a result of which they were attacked by "traditionalists". Kobrinsky, together with Vishnevsky, advocated for the rights of LGBT people and defended the safe exercise of their right to public events, opposed racism and homophobia.

Among other deputies, Alexander Kobrinsky spoke out against the so-called "Dima Yakovlev Law", which prohibits the adoption of Russian children in the United States. Instead, Kobrinsky proposed to ban Russian deputies and officials from being treated abroad.

As a deputy, Kobrinsky constantly took part in the protection of the green spaces of Saint Petersburg (Podkovyrovsky Square, Lopukhinsky Garden, Udelny Park, Malinovka Park, etc.)

In 2014, he opposed the introduction of Russian troops into Ukraine and participated in solo pickets on Nevsky Prospekt against the war with Ukraine. Participated in a spontaneous gathering of opponents of the war at the Kazan Cathedral.

Alexander Kobrinsky consistently opposes the political rehabilitation of Joseph Stalin, developed a bill on the inadmissibility of the rehabilitation and glorification of Stalin and Stalinism

Kobrinsky was also actively involved in animal protection and introduced a bill to increase liability for cruelty to animals.

In 2016, Kobrinsky turned to the governor of Saint Petersburg with a request to protect the mural depicting Daniil Kharms on the house where he lived. The proposal received support.

In 2016, after the expiration of his powers, he became an assistant to the deputy from Yabloko Boris Vishnevsky.

==== Battle for Mephistopheles ====
On August 6, 2015, Alexander Kobrinsky was the first to turn to the police with a statement about an act of vandalism: a high-relief depicting a demon (known as "Mephistopheles") was knocked down from house 24 on Lakhtinskaya Street (built by architect Aleksandr Lishnevsky) that day. Kobrinsky became one of the organizers of a mass gathering on Lakhtinskaya Street in protest against vandalism, and later on mass actions demanding that the high relief be recreated.

Immediately after this case, Kobrinsky introduced a bill to increase liability for vandalism, which, however, was not adopted by the Legislative Assembly. Kobrinsky became a member of the initiative group for the reconstruction of Mephistopheles and repeatedly (himself and together with deputy Vishnevsky) sent requests to the governor of Saint Petersburg and members of the city government regarding the acceleration of the return of the high relief to the facade of the building, met with vice-governor Bondarenko. However, the restoration was never completed.

== Allegations of sexual harassment ==
In January 2020, the Internet resource "People's News" (Narodnye Novosti) and a number of other resources that are part of Yevgeny Prigozhin's Patriot Media Group published messages about Kobrinsky's alleged correspondence with a certain girl, in which the professor allegedly made obscene proposals to his interlocutor. In October 2020, the Kholod online publication published an investigative article by Sonya Volyanova “The Brilliant Professor” about Kobrinsky's sexual harassment of female students of the Herzen University, the names of almost all the girls in the publication have been changed. The same material also includes comments by Kobrinsky himself. He stated that he invited students and female students to his home "exclusively for educational purposes." At the same time, he said that he had a “very different” relationship with female students, but did not disclose the details.

After the publication of the article, the Bureau of the Saint Petersburg branch of the Yabloko party refused to conduct its own investigation, since Kobrinsky had already filed a lawsuit for the protection of honor and dignity. A group of four party members (Igor Kochetkov, Anna Boeva, Darya Besedina, Guzel Leman) organized a commission to verify the published information. Members of the working group talked to the authors of the material and the girls who made claims (also without naming them), and, according to a report signed by Kochetkov and Boeva, they could not “find grounds to consider false the information told by the girls in the article”

In December 2020, Kobrinsky filed a lawsuit against Kholod journalist Sonya Volyanova, as well as the publication Narodnye Novosti, to protect honor and dignity. The editor-in-chief of Kholod, Taisiya Bekbulatova, notes that the cause of the lawsuit was descriptions of episodes of violence against two girls, but the court decision also refers to many other charges, in particular, accusations of sexual harassment are refuted. In December 2021, the Petrogradsky District Court of Saint Petersburg satisfied Kobrinsky's claim, requiring both defendants to publish retractions and pay compensation. The court demanded 300,000 rubles from Volyanova, and 30,000 rubles from Narodnyy Novosti (plaintiff's claims: 1 million and 300,000 rubles, respectively). On July 19, 2022, the Saint Petersburg City Court, having considered the appeal, basically left the decision of the Petrogradsky District Court unchanged, increasing the amount of recovery from the publication "People's News" to 50 thousand rubles.

In December 2021, Kobrinskiy filed a defamation complaint against Republic journalist Rimma Polyak. Claims were caused by the text “The Kobrinsky effect: the old Yabloko and the new ethics”, which described the reaction of the party to the accusations against Kobrinsky. In February 2022, after negotiations between the parties, the publication made changes to the article, and Kobrinsky announced his refusal to prosecute.
