= Pachtersoproer =

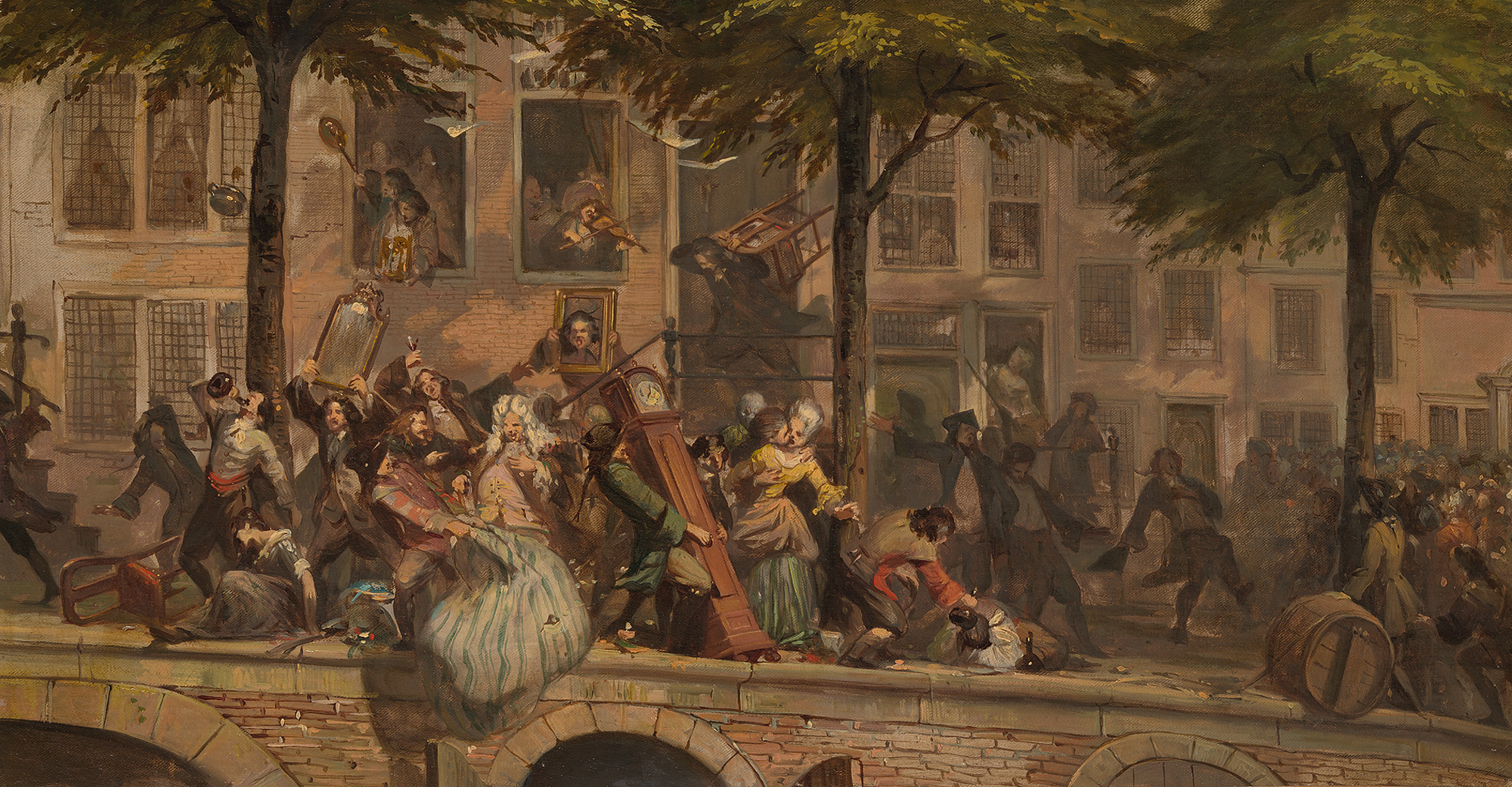
Looting the houses of the tax collectors, 1748

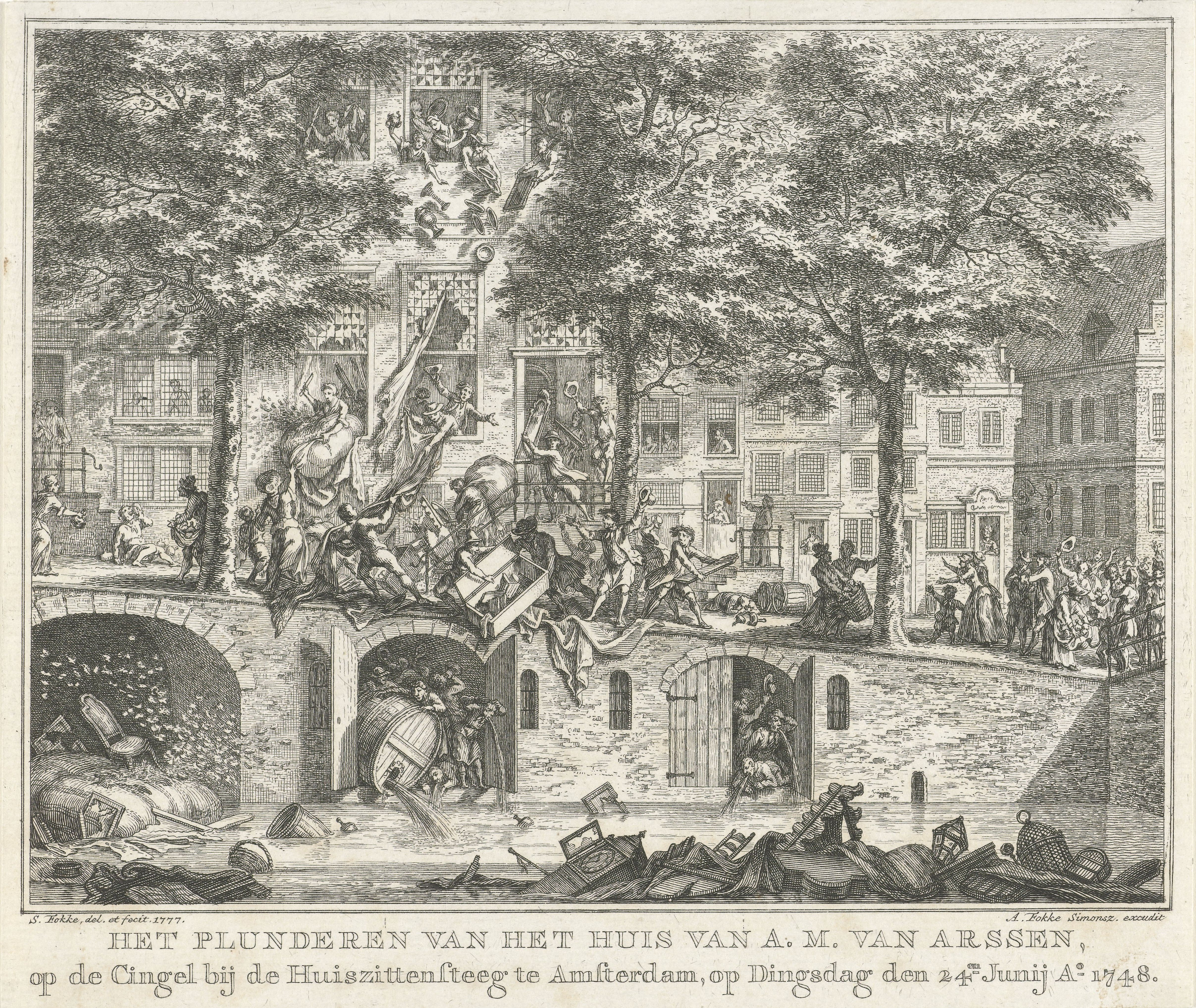
Het plunderen van het huis van A.M. van Arssen, op de Cingel bij de Huiszittensteeg te Amsterdam, op Dingsdag den 24en Junij A° 1748.

The pachtersoproer was a Dutch rebellion in the 18th century. The origin of the uprising was to be found in the economic malaise of the 1740s as a result of the Austrian War of Succession. It was the system of commercial tax-collection called pacht that brought serious complaints, combined with deep dissatisfaction at the way in which the regents and the landed gentry exercised their power.

== Reasons ==
The riots began in Friesland (Bergum) and Groningen in the spring of 1748 (March 17 in Groningen and in May). Its immediate cause was perhaps the birth of William V on March 8, 1748. The houses of the landadel (great-men) and the tax-collectors were ransacked, particularly those who had not sufficiently demonstrated their loyalty to the Orangist regime.

In the city of Leeuwarden 72 points for reform were put forward. Frisian skippers brought the news to Amsterdam. On June 17 the Botermarkt, now Rembrandtplein, called together a crowd to offer such a threat that the collectors of the butter tax saw themselves forced out of office several hours earlier than normal to conclude a peace. The riots spread rapidly to Haarlem and Leiden. On June 23 the Stadholder forbade gatherings for plays and fairs.

== Amsterdam ==
In Amsterdam riots fully broke out on Monday June 24 at the Botermarkt. Pavements were broken up and stones were thrown. People ran through the houses of the taxmen, breaking open and looting everything, and throwing crates of money and expensive porcelain from the bridges into the water. 36 houses in total were looted, and three people were killed and wounded.

The riots lasted until Tuesday evening. On Wednesday morning all pacht taxes were suspended for a period of six months. On Friday, June 28, two men and one woman would be hanged from the window of the Waag on the Dam. The onlooking crowd began to move in to be able to watch better, or possibly to try to free the convicted. Suddenly shooting was heard from the direction of Kalverstraat, and panic broke out. Many people were looking for shelter and jumped into the water from the Damrak. Contemporary local chronicler Braatbard suspected around two hundred men either got trampled or drowned.

== Sources ==
- This article is based entirely or partially on its equivalent on Dutch Wikipedia.
- (in Dutch) Brugmans, H. (1972) Geschiedenis van Amsterdam, deel IV. Afgaand getij.
- (in Dutch) Fuks, L (1960) De Zeven Provinciën in beroering. Hoofdstukken uit een jiddische kroniek 1740-1752 van Abraham Chaim Braatbard
- (in Dutch) Het dagboek van J. Bicker Raye, bewerkt door F.M. Bijerinck & M.G. de Boer, (1935).
- (in Dutch) Slot, E. (1990) Vijf gulden eeuwen. Momenten uit 500 jaar gemeentefinanciën
