= Abraham Braatbard =

- Born: 1699
- Died: 1786

Abraham Hayim ben Zvi Hirsh Braatbard (1699–1786) was an 18th-century Hebrew typesetter from Amsterdam and the author of the Yiddish chronicle Ayn Nayer Kornayk fun 1740 bis 1752.

== Overview ==
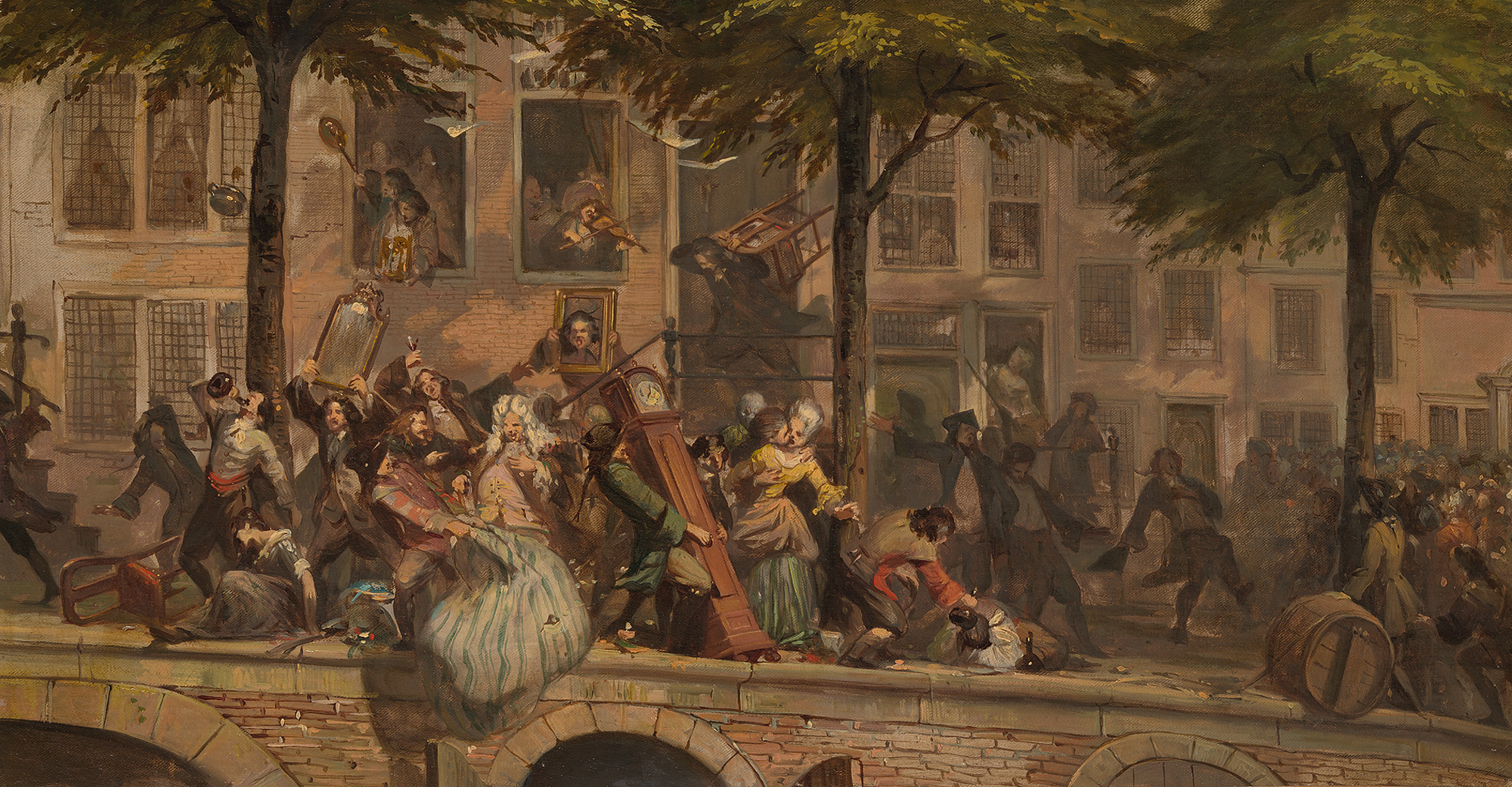
Braatbard's chronicle is one of the main sources for the pachtersoproer.

Braatbard's chronicle focuses on Jewish political and community life in the Dutch Republic and is a continuation of the work of Menahem Amelander. Braatbard discusses the failed Doelist movement in Amsterdam in some depth. Braatbard wrote, "As long as the world shall exist, never again will there be a time like these twelve years." Braatbard documented the succession battles of the House of Orange and the tax collectors' rebellion or pachtersoproer of 1748. He compares Daniel Raap to Haman, and had great confidence in William IV, Prince of Orange, who was a friend of Isaac de Pinto.

Braatbard's manuscript likely remained in private possession until 1940 and was found after World War II in the ruins of Jewish Amsterdam. It portrays his strong opinions of the political events in Amsterdam in idiomatic Yiddish and Ashkenazic cursive according to the common usage at the time, and does not reflect above-average education. He also uses a number of Hebrew words and Dutch words. It was translated by Leo Fuks in 1960 who brought it to wider knowledge.

The chronicle was likely written after 1755. It ends in 1751, at which time Braatbard had taken over his father's business.

== Personal life ==
Braatbard married Sipra Hyman in 1729 and had 9 children, 6 daughters and 3 sons. The Braatbards lived in Houtgracht. Braatbard worked a typesetter for various Jewish printers and was familiar with the Ashkenazi bookstores and meeting places for intellectual life in Amsterdam. He worked as a typesetter from at least 1725 to 1732, working on several projects for Moses Frankfurter. He also worked for Naftali Herz Levi Rofé and Joseph Dayyan.
