= Abraham Trebitsch =

Austrian Jewish scholar

Abraham ben Reuben Trebitsch (about 1760 in Trebitsch, Moravia – between 1800 and 1850 in Nikolsburg) was an Austrian Jewish scholar.

He attended the yeshibah of Löb Fischels at Prague in 1775 ("Ḳorot ha-'Ittim," p. 24a), and then settled in Nikolsburg, where he became secretary to the Landesrabbiner.

He was the author of "Ḳorot ha-'Ittim," a history of the European monarchs, including the emperors of Austria, from 1741 to 1801 (part i., Brünn, 1801; with additions, under the title "Ḳorot Nosafot," up to the year 1830, by Jacob Bodek, Lemberg, 1841). It deals especially with the history and literature of the Jews in the Austrian states. Trebitsch's work is a continuation of Menahem Mann ben Solomon ha-Levi's "She'erit Yisrael," which traces the history down to the year 1740.

Trebitsch, with Hirsch Menaḳḳer, was the author of "Ruaḥ Ḥayyim," a story of the exorcising of an evil spirit that possessed a young man (published in Hebrew and Yiddish, Nikolsburg, 1785; Frankfurt (Oder), 1794).
