= Jacob Bodek =

Galician Maskilic writer

- Born: 24 June 1819; Lemberg, Galicia, Austrian Empire
- Died: 18 July 1855 (aged 36); Lemberg, Galicia, Austrian Empire
- Writing career
- Language: Hebrew
- Literary movement: Haskalah

Jacob Bodek (Hebrew: יעקב בודק; 24 June 1819 – 18 July 1855) was a Galician Maskilic writer.

== Biography ==
Jacob Bodek was born in Lemberg (now Lviv, Ukraine), where he spent most of his life.

Bodek was a leading member of Ha-Ro'im ('The Spectators'), a group of conservative Maskilim opposed to the "scientific" strand of the Haskalah. Together with his brother-in-law, A. M. Mohr, he published a journal entitled Ha-ro'eh ve-mevaker sifre meḥavre zemanenu ('Spectator and Critic of Contemporary Works'; Lemberg, 1837), which contained polemical articles criticizing the work of Solomon Judah Rapoport, Samuel David Luzzatto, and Isaac Samuel Reggio. Due to the efforts of Joshua Heschel Schorr and others, the work was banned in the Austrian Empire. The second volume was thus published in Hungary under a separate title.

Later, he published with Mohr a periodical entitled Yerushalayim ('Jerusalem'), which appeared at irregular intervals between 1844 and 1855. The journal was less confrontational than Ha-ro'eh, and generally more sympathetic to Rapoport. Bodek also republished with notes the chronicles of Abraham Trebitsch, Korot ha-ʻitim which cover the period from 1741 to 1801, and Korot nosafot, a continuation until the year 1850 (Lemberg, 1851). His biography of his friend, Zvi Hirsch Chajes, appeared in Ha-Maggid (1857).

Bodek died in Lemberg in the 1855 cholera pandemic.

== Publications ==
- Ha-ro'eh ve-mevaker sifre meḥavre zemanenu [Spectator and Critic of Contemporary Works]. Lemberg. 1837. Edited with A. M. Mohr.
- Emek Shoshanim [Valley of Roses]. Ofen. 1839. Edited with A. M. Mohr.
- Trebitsch, Abraham (1851). Korot ha-ʻitim: sipure kol ha-milḥamot mi-shenat 5501 ʻad 5561. Lemberg: s.n. Edited by Bodek, with supplementary material under the title Korot nosafot ('Additional Details').
- "Toldot ha-Rav Tsvi Chayes". Ha-Maggid. 1 (8–11). 1857.
