= Canadian Immigration Hospital =

Geography
- Location: Halifax, Nova Scotia, Canada
- Coordinates: 44.63909°N 63.56688°W

Links
- Lists: Hospitals in Canada

The Canadian Immigration Hospital was an acute care hospital located in Halifax, Nova Scotia at Pier 21.
