= Amiram Goldblum =

Israeli chemist and activist (born 1945)

- עמירם גולדבלום
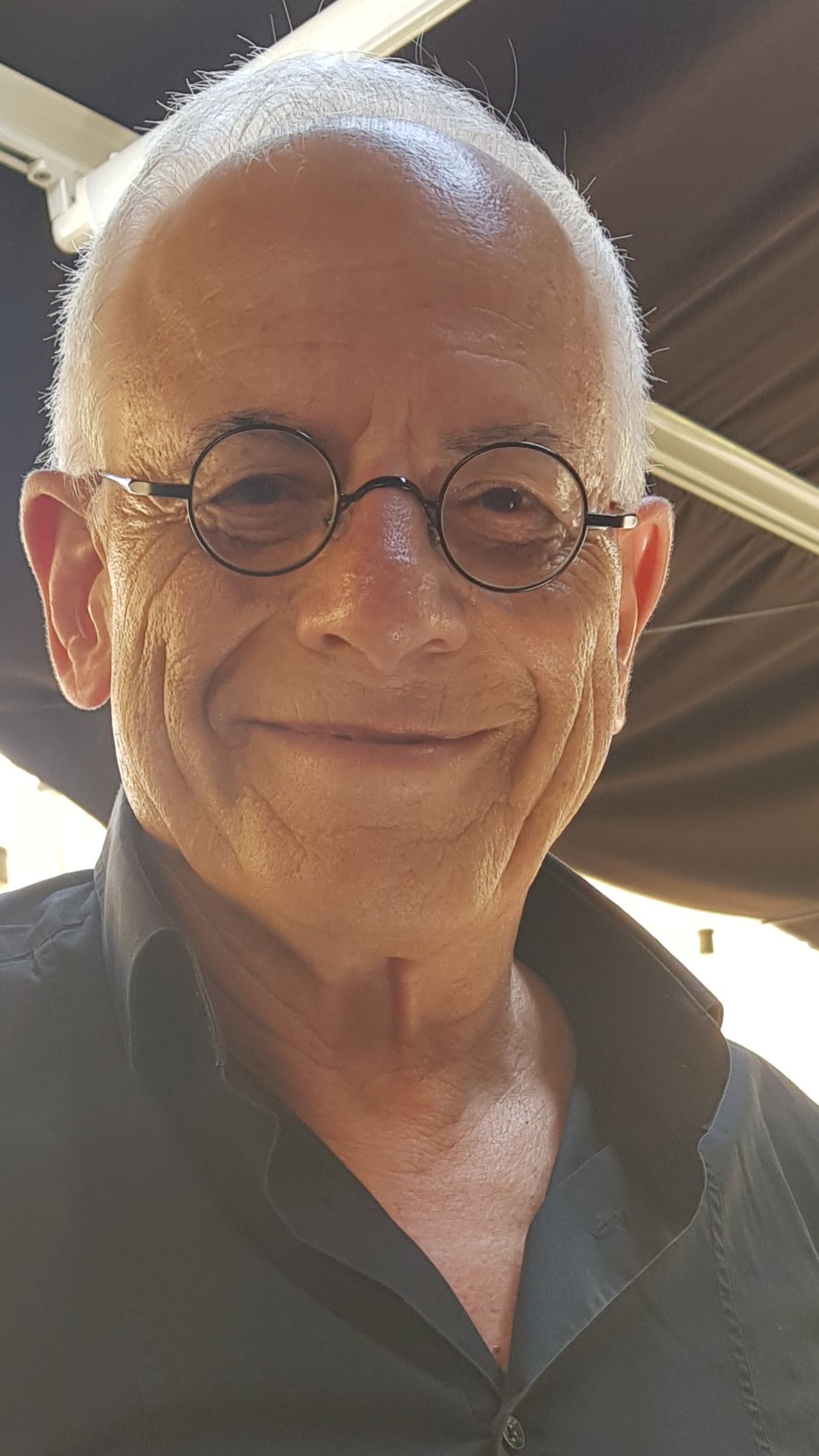
- Goldblum in 2022
- Born: 1945 (age 80–81); Rosh Pinna, British Mandate of Palestine
- Spouse(s): Israela Weinstien (m. 1967; died 2006); Idit Amihai (m. 2012)
- Children: Dan Goldblum, Maya Goldblum

Amiram Goldblum (Hebrew: עמירם גולדבלום; born 22 December 1945) is an Israeli chemist and activist in the Israeli–Palestinian conflict. He is Professor Emeritus of Computational Medicinal Chemistry at the Hebrew University of Jerusalem School of Pharmacy. He holds a PhD in organic chemistry from the Hebrew University. He is the head of the Molecular Modelling and Drug Design unit at the university's Institute for Drug Research.

Goldblum was a leader of Peace Now, served as its spokesperson for 20 years, and constructed the Settlements Watch activities of Peace Now. Until 2020, he was on the board of the international council of the New Israel Fund.

== Biography ==
Amiram Goldblum was born in Rosh Pinna in 1945. He is the son of Professor Natan Goldblum, a senior officer in the Medical Corps of the IDF until 1956 and an Israel Prize recipient (1988) for his lifetime efforts to eradicate viral diseases in Israel, in particular, polimyellitis a. The family was evacuated to Haifa during the 1948 Arab–Israeli War. Goldblum's mother Tamar (née Toren) was a member of the Irgun and had been in the Beitar youth movement, being instructed by Eliyahu Meridor (father of Israeli politician and Minister Dan Meridor). Goldblum attended high school in the Hebrew University Secondary School. Goldblum studied chemistry and physics at the Hebrew University of Jerusalem, as a student of Ernst David Bergmann and of Raphael Mechoulam, and continued postdoc studies in Paris with Bernard Pullman and Alberte Pullman and with Corwin Hansch in Pomona College (California). During the years 1970-1979 he served as a news announcer in Kol Yisrael and as an anchor of classical and jazz music programs on the Israeli Radio. Goldblum joined the Hebrew University in 1979 and became associate professor of Medicinal Chemistry in 1989 and full professor in 2010 and retired in 2015, becoming Professor Emeritus. Goldblum is a member of the Supreme Academic Council of the Jerusalem Academy of Music and Dance and member of the Supreme Academic Council of the AlQasemi Academy in Baka El Gharbieh

Goldblum was married to Israela Weinstein from 1967 until her death in 2006. Goldblum is married to Idit Amihai, head of Museums and Public Galleries departments of Israel's Ministry of Culture and Sports.

Goldblum's son, Dan Goldblum, who served in the Israeli Commando Unit, Sayeret Matkal, was badly wounded in the commando's preparative operation (Operation Bramble Bush) to kill Saddam Hussein, on 5 November 1992. Goldblum's daughter Maya served in Sayeret Matkal following her brother.

Goldblum fought in the Yom Kippur War, October 1973, as part of battalion 86 which was attached to armoured Division 460. Goldblum fought with his unit over the Suez Canal, where his unit was fighting inside the Egyptian city of Suez toward the end of the war Battle of Suez. The story of some of Goldblum's actions during that war was published in 2014.

== Scientific career ==
Goldblum invented an algorithm for solving extremely complex combinatorial problems, called Iterative Stochastic Elimination (ISE).

Goldblum's ISE algorithm is the basis for two Hebrew University science-related companies that expand on his research and discovery of drug candidates, Pepticom, and RebioticsRX, focusing on nanomedicine He won first prize in the contest of the American Chemical Society Computers in Chemistry Division in the ACS meeting, Washington D.C. 2000 for his new algorithm, which was developed together with PhD student Meir Glick. Goldblum was awarded the Kaye Innovation Prize in 2017 for "dramatic improvements in drug discovery methods". Fraunhofer Institute, the leading European Application oriented research center opened one of its two first project centers, "Fraunhofer Project center on Drug discovery and delivery" in the labs of Profs. Golomb (drug delivery) and Goldblum (Drug Discovery) at the Institute for Drug Research.

Goldblum's research is focused on the discovery of new drugs against SARS-CoV-2, on Cannabinoids and the CNS, and obesity.

== Political activism ==
Goldblum was the spokesperson of Peace Now from 1980 to 2000. He was in the front line of the demonstration when Peace Now protester Emil Grunzweig was murdered. He later identified the incident as a "catalyst" for greater political activism. Goldblum initiated the Settlements Watch activities of Peace Now in 1990. In 1995, Goldblum, referring to the Israeli cabinet decision to expand the settlements, said, "We believe that this decision is going to bring a tremendous clash with the Palestinians." In a 2001 interview after the beginning of the Second Intifada, Goldblum discussed the name of the organization Peace Now, saying "The name is very problematic. Today I would not choose the same name for the movement, but we can't change it now. I find this name extremely difficult and it is even a source of embarrassment for me. I can't even put the movement's sticker on my car."

In October 2012, Goldblum and his family foundation, the Yisraela Fund paid for and were involved (along with other Israeli academics) in commissioning a controversial poll regarding Israeli attitudes towards prejudice, along with Mordechai Bar-On, Ilan Baruch, Alon Liel, and Michael Sfard. In a press release of the commissioning group, sent by Goldblum, it was stated, "a large part of the Jewish population (58%) accepts the application of the term 'apartheid' to the current state of affairs in Israel. It is, however, not clear what these respondents understand by the term as this question did not require clarification." Goldblum also acknowledged there were problems with a question used on the poll. Israeli statistician Camil Fuchs, who supervised the company that conducted the poll, told The Times of Israel that the questions in the poll were fine and did not need changing by the Dialog team.

In January 2013 Goldblum was #87 on the candidates list of Meretz, for the Knesset elections.

In February 2013, Goldblum was one of the organizers of a gathering at the Van Leer Institute in Jerusalem which discussed apartheid in the Israeli context. A new NGO, 'The Organization for the Prevention of Apartheid in Israel', was established to expose and fight against trends of racism and apartheid in Israel.

Due to his political views, Goldblum decided in April 2020 to leave the International Council of the New Israel Fund saying that he "left in order to be free and independent, in order not to attribute to NIF anything that I say which is different than what NIF says". New Israel Fund denied a report on Makor Rishon claiming that "NIF dissociated itself from Goldblum in the wake of his derogatory remarks about Israeli settlers and right wing figures". NIF reacted by declaring that "Contrary to what is said in this report, NIF did not take any steps against Prof. Goldblum, Goldblum was not rejected from the International Council, NIF did not dissociate itself from him and did not request to do so. As Goldblum said, he requested to leave on his own will. Prof. Goldblum is a person of countless virtues who devoted all his life to voluntary activism for the sake of Peace and Equality, for the sake of the State of Israel, The Israeli Society and for the New Israel Fund and we thank him for that".
