= Goldblatt =

Goldblatt is a surname, meaning "gold leaf" in the German language. Notable people named Goldblatt include:

- David Goldblatt, South African photographer
- Harry Goldblatt, American physician
- Hilda Goldblatt Gorenstein, artist
- Mark Goldblatt, American cinema editor
- Max Goldblatt, American actor, son of Mark
- Peter Goldblatt, South African botanist
- Robert Goldblatt, New Zealand philosopher and mathematician
- Rose Goldblatt, Canadian administrator, pianist and teacher
- Scott Goldblatt, American swimmer
- Stephen Goldblatt, American artist and animator

== Other ==
- Goldblatt's, Chicago department store
