= St. Petersburg Institute of Jewish Studies =

Academic institution In Russia

- Former names: Leningrad Jewish University (1989–1991); St. Petersburg Jewish University (1991–1997)
- Type: private university
- Established: 1989
- Rector: Dmitri Elyashevich
- Students: 100
- Location: St. Petersburg, Russia
- Website: http://www.pijs.ru/

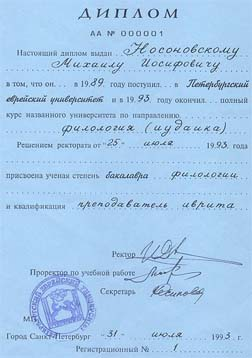
First diploma certificate issued by St. Petersburg Jewish University in 1993

St. Petersburg Institute of Jewish Studies (Russian: Петербургский Институт Иудаики, also known as St. Petersburg Jewish University in 1991–1997 and Leningrad Jewish University in 1989–1991) is a private institution of higher education in the area of Jewish Studies in Saint Petersburg, Russia.

== History ==
Leningrad Jewish University was established in 1989 as a continuation of the Baron Günzburg's Courses for Oriental Studies (1907–1917) and the Petrograd / Leningrad Jewish University (1919–1925). The latter was closed by the Soviet Authorities as "unnecessary" in 1925. The new Leningrad Jewish University was created in 1989 during the new Soviet policy of Perestroika by enthusiasts and Jewish Activists, Ilya Dvorkin (the first Rector of the university), Veniamin Lukin, Khava Korzakova, and others. During its first year '89/90 only evening classes were offered of Hebrew, history, Torah studies, as well as seminars on Ethnography, Linguistics and Local History, and several others.

Since 1991, morning and day classes were offered and a four-year educational program was established, aiming to prepare Bachelors of Arts in Hebrew, history, and education. The university was officially recognized and accredited. The first alumni graduated in 1996.

In 1997 the name of the university was changed to St. Petersburg Institute of Jewish Studies. Prof. Dmitri Elyashevich became the rector of the institute in 1997, and Prof. Alexander Kobrinsky is the vice-Rector / Provost.

The institute worked at various addresses, including the Jewish Community Center of St. Petersburg and became a prominent part of the Jewish community of St. Petersburg.

== Research ==
The institute is a home of a largest Jewish library in the Former Soviet Union. Several scientific conferences on Jewish education, history and other aspects of Jewish Studies were organized by the university. The journal Evreyskaya Shkola ("Jewish School" in Russian) was published in 1992-1996. The series "Trudy po Iudaike" ("The works on Jewish Studies") are published since 1993. The Institute for the Studies of Jewish Diaspora organized numerous expeditions and field trips to Ukraine, Belarus, Baltic States, the Central Asia and the Caucasus. The materials are kept in the Archive of the Institute.

== Notable alumni & faculty ==
- Dmitri Elyashevish
- Ilya Dvorkin
- Alexander Kobrinsky
- Hava Korzakova
- Boris Haimovich
- Leonard Hertzenberg
