= David Goldbaum =

Mexican surveyor and politician

- Born: 1858; Mexico
- Died: c. 1930
- Education: Colorado School of Mines
- Children: Federico Goldbaum; Rodolfo Goldbaum
- Relatives: Marcus Goldbaum (paternal uncle); Julius Goldbaum (cousin)

David Goldbaum (1858–1930) was a Mexican surveyor and politician. He served as the mayor of Ensenada, Baja California, from 1927 to 1930 and surveyed much of Baja California.

== Early life ==
David Goldbaum was born in 1858 in Mexico. His father was of Polish-Jewish origin who emigrated to Mexico as a pioneer. His paternal uncle, Marcus Goldbaum, was a German-born settler in the Arizona Territory who tried to bargain with Native Americans to release their captives in 1866–1870, and was later murdered by the Apaches in 1886. His cousin, Julius Goldbaum, sold tobacco, wine and cheese through Julius Goldbaum, Inc. in Arizona; he also owned mining interests in Arizona.

Goldbaum was kidnapped with several schoolchildren as a child and released after his father paid a ransom. Shortly after, he was sent to be educated in San Francisco, California in the United States. He graduated from the Colorado School of Mines in Golden, Colorado, where he studied Mineralogy.

== Career ==
Goldbaum served as the surveyor of much of Baja California, including Ensenada, where he settled. He also served as the Director of the Museo Regional in Ensenada. He then served as Mayor from 1927 to 1930.

He explored much of Baja California, where he owned mining interests. He wrote The Charles Pacheco colony, an essay of fourteen pages, in 1917. A year later, in 1918, he wrote, Indian tribes of northern district, Lower California, Mexico., an essay of twenty-three pages. That same year, he wrote Towns and villages of Lower California. in 1918.

Goldbaum co-wrote Towns of Baja California: A 1918 Report. It was rediscovered by Ellen C. Barrett in 1954 and translated into English by William O. Hendricks of the Sherman Foundation. In a 1972 academic review written by Dr. W. Michael Mathes, an Associate Professor of History at the University of San Francisco, for The Journal of San Diego History, Mathes suggested it was "rather brief", with "a well-researched and well-written introduction and extensive historical notes on each settlement".

In 1930, shortly before his death, he wrote Lower California, Its History, Resources, Possibilities and Opportunities: Fishing, Hunting and Points of Interest.

According to the Jewish Telegraphic Agency, he was "a personal friend" of Presidents Porfirio Díaz, Plutarco Elías Calles and Emilio Portes Gil.

== Death ==
He died in 1930. His two sons, Federico and Rodolfo, died of the yellow fever.

== Legacy ==
The Crassinella goldbaumi, a mollusk mostly found in Baja California, was named in his honor.
