= Richard Goldbloom =

Canadian pediatrician (1924–2021)

Richard Goldbloom OC ONS
- Goldbloom in Toronto in 1990
- Born: December 16, 1924; Montreal, Quebec, Canada
- Died: November 18, 2021 (aged 96); Halifax, Nova Scotia, Canada
- Occupation: Pediatrician/University Chancellor
- Spouse(s): Ruth Goldbloom (née Schwartz) (1946—2012)
- Children: Alan, David, & Barbara Goldbloom
- Parent(s): Alton & Annie (née Ballon) Goldbloom

Richard Ballon Goldbloom OC ONS (December 16, 1924 – November 18, 2021) was a Canadian pediatrician, university professor, and the fifth chancellor of Dalhousie University. The son of Montreal pediatrician Alton Goldbloom, he was educated at Selwyn House School and Lower Canada College. He received a Bachelor of Science degree in 1945 and a Doctor of Medicine degree in 1949 from McGill University. He did his post-graduate medical education at the Royal Victoria Hospital, the Montreal Children's Hospital and the Children's Hospital Boston. From 1964 to 1967, he was an associate professor at McGill University and a physician at the Montreal Children's Hospital. From 1967 to 1985, he was the head of Dalhousie University's Department of Pediatrics. He was the first physician-in-chief and director of research at the Izaak Walton Killam Hospital for Children in Halifax, Nova Scotia.

In 1975 he became the founding president of the Halifax-Dartmouth Waterfront Development Corp., a federal and provincial agency that worked towards restoration and development of the area's waterfront, until 1980, when he was unexplainably removed by the Nova Scotia government. A classical pianist, Goldbloom was the president of the Atlantic Symphony Orchestra in the 1970s. From 1983 to 1985, he was Chairman of the Rhodes Scholar Selection Committee and since 1989 he has been the Chairman of the Maritimes Rhodes Scholar Selection Committee.

On December 29, 1986, was appointed an Officer of the Order of Canada. He was invested into the order on April 29, 1987 for

promot[ing] outreach traveling pediatric clinics and the "Regional Pediatric Program" which is aimed at upgrading the pediatric knowledge and skills of general practitioners in Nova Scotia.

In 2017 he was inducted into the Canadian Medical Hall of Fame.

His older brother Victor Goldbloom also started his career as a pediatrician, and later became a politician and then Canadian Commissioner of Official Languages, and Companion of the Order of Canada. Richard was married to fellow Order of Canada recipient Ruth Goldbloom (née Schwartz) from 1946 until her death in 2012. They had three children. Their oldest son, Alan Goldbloom, was the former C.O.O. of Toronto's Hospital for Sick Children and is retired as the president and CEO of Children's Hospitals and Clinics of Minnesota. Their daughter, Barbara Goldbloom-Hughes, is an education consultant in Burlington, Ontario. Their youngest son, David Goldbloom, is the former Physician-in-Chief at Toronto's Centre for Addiction and Mental Health (CAMH). He now serves as Senior Medical Adviser to the CAMH, as well as Chair of the Mental Health Commission of Canada.

Goldbloom died on November 18, 2021, in Halifax, at the age of 96 – about three weeks short of his 97th birthday.

== See also ==
- List of Canadian university leaders

== Notes ==
- "Canadian Who's Who 1997 entry".
- "Dr. Alton Goldbloom". Canadian Jewish Congress Institutional Collections Personal Collections and Other Collections. Canada Jewish Congress Archives. 2002. Archived from the original on 2007-09-27.

Academic offices
Preceded by Graham Day	Chancellor of Dalhousie University; 2001 – 2008	Succeeded by Fred Fountain
