= Marcus Goldbaum =

Prussian-born American pioneer and prospector (1835–1886)

- Born: 1835; Prussia
- Died: 1886 (aged 50–51); Arizona Territory
- Spouse: Sara Goldbaum
- Children: 7
- Relatives: David Goldbaum (nephew)

Marcus Goldbaum (1835–1886) was a Prussian-born American pioneer and prospector in the Arizona Territory.

== Early life ==
Marcus Goldbaum was born in 1835 in Prussia to a Polish-Jewish family. He immigrated to the United States in the 1850s.

== Career ==
Goldbaum lived in Kansas, Colorado, New Mexico and California in the 1860s. In 1869, he moved to Tucson, Arizona. He served as a Justice of the Peace in Wickenburg, Arizona, in 1870. He also lived in Florence, Harshaw, Benson and Tombstone. He then settled down in Tucson, where he worked as a butcher. He also worked as a butcher in Phoenix.

Goldbaum was also a prospector in Southern Arizona, including the Whetstone Mountains.

== Personal life and death ==
Goldbaum was married to Sara Goldbaum. They had seven children, four of which were born in Bavaria and three in Arizona.

Goldbaum was killed by Apache Native Americans in the Whetstone Mountains in 1886.
