= Maks Erik =

Maks Erik (born Zalmen Merkin; 1898-1937) was a Jewish literary critic, literary scholar and historian of Yiddish literature. He married his student Idę Rosenhein.

== Early life and education ==
Merkin was born in the Dabrowa Basin in Sosnowiec (then in the Russian Empire) and his mother's brother was Yitzhak Pejsekzon, the founder of the General Jewish Workers' Union. His general and Jewish educations were both very good - he attended cheder and a Russian-language secondary school and his private tutors included Hayim Nahman Bialik.

After secondary school - with Sosnowiec now falling in an independent Poland - he moved to a Polish officer-training school in 1919,) graduating with the rank of reserve officer two years later. After completing his army service he decided to study law, which he did at the University of Krakow from 1921 to 1922.

== Career ==
He moved to Vilnius in 1924 and there taught Polish and Yiddish literature in local secondary schools there from 1925 to 1926.

Aged twenty, he began publishing his first articles in Yiddish, mainly dealing with contemporary writers working in Europe. "Literarisze Bleter" published his texts on figures such as David Bergelson, Moyshe Kulbak and Joseph Opatoshu. He focussed on the period up to and including the 18th century, which became the main theme of his later works such as the book Wegn altjidiszn roman un nowele (On the Old Yiddish Novel and Short Story).

Also in 1920, his first essay was published in I.M. Weissenberg's Judisze Zamelbicher - the topic was neo-Catholicism and Hugo Cukerman. His first book, published in 1924, was Konstrukcje sztudjen: cu der konstruktions fun der Goldene Kejt (An Interpretive Study: An Interpretation of "The Golden Chain"), on the plays Di goldene kejt (The Golden Chain) and Baj nacht ojfn altn mark (At Night in the Old Market Square), both by I. L. Peretz. His work was characterised by the thorough and independent research behind them. While writing the book Geszichte fun der jidiszer literatur: Fun di eltste cajtn biz der haskole-tkufe (The History of Yiddish Literature: From the Earliest Times to the Haskalah Period) he visited many libraries in western Europe.

He also formulated a theory dividing Yiddish literature into two periods: the "Shpilman period" (the troubadour period) and the "Muser period" (the ethical period). This theory connected traditional Judaism with secular tendencies in Yiddish literature. According to Erik, the Jewish troubadour was the prototype of the modern, secular creator of Yiddish literature, drawing from other languages and adapting compositions into Yiddish. This thesis was criticized during his lifetime, and recent research has completely refuted it.

In 1929, he settled in Minsk in the Soviet Union, hoping that modern Yiddish literature would captivate the radical segment of the Jewish community. However, his activities for the Poale Zion party hindered his literary work. In 1932 he was forced to move to Kyiv and - as in Minsk - he taught at various Jewish institutions and academic institutions. During this period his work increasingly adopted the party's preferred perspective, forcing him to abandon research on Yiddish literature almost completely.

He instead focused on research into the Haskalah period in Germany and Galicia in his Etjudn cu der geszichte fund der haskole (A Study on the History of the Haskalah). His publications also focused on Sholem Asch.

== Later life ==
In 1936, after the liquidation of the Institute of Jewish Proletarian Culture at the Ukrainian Academy of Sciences, he was arrested and sent to a gulag in Siberia, where he died a year later.

== Bibliography ==
- Avraham Novershtern. "Erik, Maks". The Yivo Encyclopedia of Jews in Eastern Europe.
- Skolnik, Fred; Michael Berenbaum (2007). Encyclopaedia Judaica, Volume 6 (2nd ed.). Granite Hill Publishers. p. 479. ISBN 978-0-02-865928-2. ISBN 9780028659282.
- Roskies, David G. (2008). Yiddishlands: A. Memoir. Wayne State University Press. p. 215. ISBN 978-0-8143-3544-4. ISBN 9780814335444.
- Z. Reyzen. "Max Erik". Museum of Family History. p. 815-818.
