= Ruth Goldbloom =

Canadian philanthropist (1923–2012)

Ruth Goldbloom OC ONS
- Ruth Goldbloom in Sydney, Nova Scotia, February 1990
- Born: December 5, 1923; New Waterford, Nova Scotia
- Died: August 29, 2012 (aged 88); Lunenburg, Nova Scotia
- Occupation: Philanthropist/Administrator
- Known for: Canadian Museum of Immigration at Pier 21
- Spouse: Dr. Richard Goldbloom
- Children: Dr. Alan Goldbloom, Dr. David Goldbloom, Ms. Barbara Goldbloom Hughes
- Parent(s): Abraham and Rose Schwartz (née Claener)

Ruth Miriam Goldbloom OC ONS (née Schwartz, December 5, 1923 – August 29, 2012) was a Canadian philanthropist who co-founded the Canadian Museum of Immigration at Pier 21 in Halifax, Nova Scotia. She was born and raised in New Waterford, Nova Scotia, to immigrant parents. Their immigrant experience influenced her throughout her life and was a major factor in her helping to found Pier 21. She became the first Jew to Chair Mount Saint Vincent University's board, which was a Catholic women's university at the time. She was the chancellor of the Technical University of Nova Scotia in the 1990s and fundraising chair for the Halifax area United Way. She was inducted into the Order of Canada for her work with charities in the 1980s and 1990s.

== Early life ==
Goldbloom was born and raised as Ruth Miriam Schwartz, in New Waterford, Cape Breton, Nova Scotia. Her grandparents and parents immigrated to Canada from the Pale of Settlement, Russian Empire, with their immigrant experience influencing her throughout her life. She attended both Mount Allison University and McGill University. She met Richard Goldbloom at McGill, and married him in 1946. They moved to Halifax, Nova Scotia, from Montreal in 1967 with their family.

== Community work ==
When Goldbloom moved to Halifax in 1967 with her husband and family, she began to get involved in the community. She was a fundraising chair for the Izaak Walton Killam Children's Hospital, where her husband was the Physician-in-Chief. She became a fundraiser for Mount Saint Vincent University, at the time a women-only Catholic institution. In the 1980s, she became the first Jew to chair the University's board. In 1989, she became the first chairwoman of the Halifax United Way's annual fundraising drive. She served as the Chancellor for the Technical University of Nova Scotia before it merged with Dalhousie University. She became a fundraiser for the Cape Breton Regional Hospital in 2009. She and her husband were also involved with the Arts community, and they helped support Symphony Nova Scotia and its precursor the Atlantic Symphony Orchestra.

== Pier 21 ==
Goldbloom was the second chair of the Pier 21 Society, which eventually established the Canadian Museum of Immigration at Pier 21. She spearheaded the fundraising efforts to raise $16 million to build a new museum at the pier, which opened in 1999. Pier 21 operated as an ocean liner terminal and immigration entry point from 1928 to 1971. In 2009, the year that the museum was designated a national museum, with Goldbloom present as the Prime Minister announced the museum's new status; Goldbloom noted that she always wanted it "to become the second museum outside of Ottawa to be a national museum of immigration."

== Awards ==
She was appointed a Member of the Order of Canada in 1992 for her fundraising work at the Halifax United Way and at Mount Saint Vincent University. She was later promoted to an Officer of the Order of Canada in April 2000 for her work at Pier 21 and as Chancellor of the Technical University of Nova Scotia. Goldbloom was awarded the Order of Nova Scotia in 2008 for her volunteer work in social, religious and heritage organizations in that province. She was awarded seven honorary doctorate degrees from Dalhousie University, Mount Saint Vincent University, Nova Scotia Community College, Nova Scotia College of Art and Design, Mount Allison University, University of King's College, and Acadia University. As well, she was awarded numerous awards from Jewish organizations, and community groups.

== Personal life ==
Goldbloom died from cancer on August 29, 2012, aged 88. She was survived by her husband, Dr. Richard Goldbloom, three children, seven grandchildren and four great grand children. A large public funeral was held next to Pier 21 at the Cunard Centre, with the premier of Nova Scotia, Darrell Dexter; Lt. Governor John James Grant; other government officials and prominent people in attendance.
