= Slavonic Josephus =

Old East Slavic translation of Flavius Josephus' History of the Jewish War

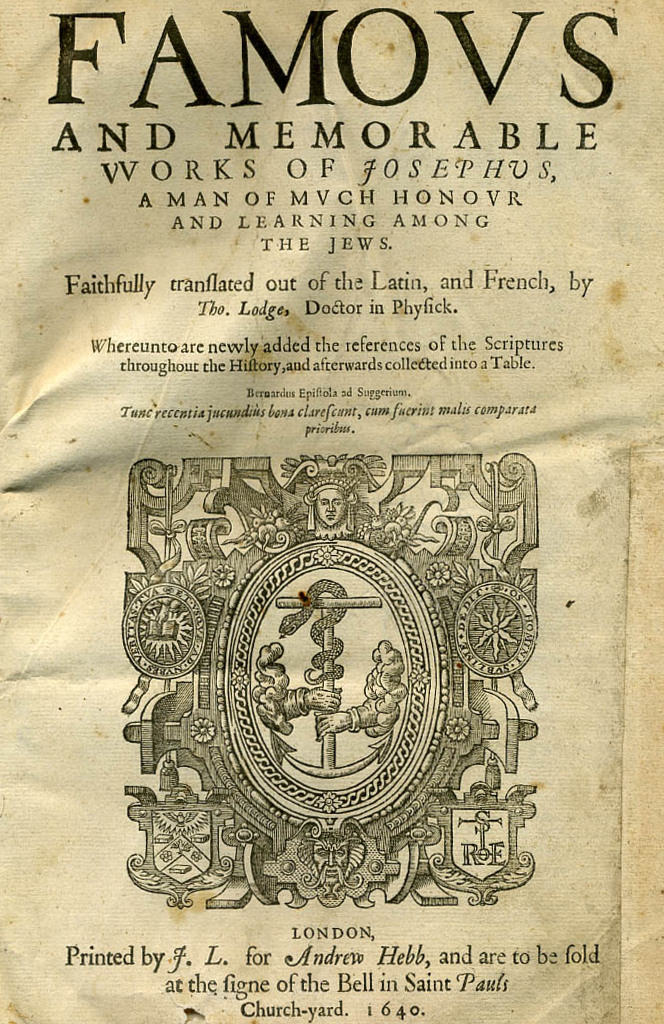
A 1640 edition of the Works of Josephus

The Slavonic Josephus is an Old East Slavic translation of Flavius Josephus' History of the Jewish War which contains numerous interpolations and omissions that set it apart from all other known versions of Josephus' History. The authenticity of the interpolations was a major subject of controversy in the 20th century, but the latest scholarship has rejected them.

== Background ==
Josephus wrote all of his surviving works after becoming established in Rome (c. 71 AD) under the patronage of the Flavian emperor Vespasian. As is common with ancient texts, however, there are no surviving extant manuscripts of Josephus' works that can be dated before the 11th century. The oldest of these are all Greek minuscules, copied by Christian monks. (Jews did not preserve the writings of Josephus because they considered him to be a traitor.) Of the about 120 extant Greek manuscripts of Josephus, 33 predate the 14th century.

According to Van Voorst, Creed, and a narrow group of researchers, the references to Jesus by Josephus found in Book 18 and Book 20 of the Antiquities of the Jews do not appear in any other versions of Josephus' The Jewish War except for a Slavonic version of the Testimonium Flavianum (at times called Testimonium Slavonium). This version surfaced in the West at the beginning of the 20th century, after its discovery in Russia at the end of the 19th century.

== History of the text ==
The earliest surviving manuscript of the Slavonic Josephus dates to 1463. The translation itself, however, is at least a century older than that. Some scholars have associated it with the very first Slavic school of translators active in the ninth and tenth centuries. Others have associated it with the Jewish community of Lvov in the fourteenth century. Virtually any date between those two extremes is possible.

The text is generally associated with Kievan Rus' on the grounds that it has proto-Russian features. It was widely copied and survives in some 33 manuscripts. In some it is interwoven with the chronicles of the Byzantine historians John Malalas and George Hamartolos to form a single universal history.

Grigorije Vasilije was a Serbian Orthodox monk and scribe who translated The Jewish War from Old Church Slavonic to Serbian in the sixteenth century. All predate the first English translation of Josephus's writings based on the Latin text made in 1602 by Thomas Lodge.

== History of the controversy ==
The existence of the documents that led to the discovery of the Slavonic Josephus was first brought to light by A. N. Popov in Russia in 1866. In 1879 Izmail Sreznevsky pointed out that the language used was not Bulgarian or Serbian, but comparable to Rus' chronicles. At about the same time as Sreznevsky, the subject was also studied by E. Barsov and by the end of the 19th century knowledge of the existence of the documents was established in the west via its listing by Niese and Destinon in 1894. Alexander Berendts published a German translation in 1906 and proposed the theory that the Slavonic version had been derived from the original Aramaic of Josephus. However, Paul L. Maier states that the Slavonic Josephus "includes so many sensationalized accretions" that most modern scholars consider it as a highly colored translation and paraphrase, and do not consider it to be true to the original Aramaic.

The Slavonic Josephus was defended in 1926 as authentic by Robert Eisler and was later supported by George Williamson. Robert Van Voorst states that apart from Eisler's controversial book and Williamson statements, "no strong defense has been made" for the authenticity of the Slavonic Josephus. Henry Leeming states that Eisler at times used insufficiently substantiated material which were then discredited, adding that Eisler's philological attempts to reverse translate from Old Russian to Greek were shown to be "extremely flimsy". Van Voorst states that the contents of the passages in the Slavonic Josephus show that "they are Christian compositions and that they do not provide an authentic textual alternative to the main Testimonium Flavianum.

In 1948 Solomon Zeitlin argued that the Slavonic Josephus was composed for the purpose of giving a Christian version of Josephus in Greek.

Steven B. Bowman states that the consideration of the Slavonic Josephus should be removed from the scholarly discussions of the first century, for it only pertains to the Macedonian elements of the 10th and 11th centuries. The Cambridge History of Judaism states that the Slavonic version includes statements which Josephus could have hardly written and that recent scholarly opinion dismisses the Slavonic Josephus as less than authentic, but the 11th-century creation as an ideological struggle against the Khazars. Van Voorst states that the Slavonic Josephus at times focuses on blaming the Jews, to the point of suggesting that the Jews and not the Romans crucified Jesus.

Louis Feldman states that the question "is Josephus the author of the additions and modifications in the Slavonic version" has usually received a negative answer. Craig A. Evans states that although some scholars had in the past supported the Slavonic Josephus, "to my knowledge no one today believes that they contain anything of value for Jesus research".

== See also ==
- Josephus on Jesus
- Trilingual heresy
- Grigorije Vasilije

== Bibliography ==
- Baras, Zvi (1987). "The Testimonium Flavianum and the Martyrdom of James". In Feldman, Louis H.; Hata, Gōhei (eds.). Josephus, Judaism and Christianity. Brill. ISBN 978-90-04-08554-1.
- Bowman, Steven B. (1987). "Josephus in Byzantium". In Feldman, Louis H.; Hata, Gōhei (eds.). Josephus, Judaism and Christianity. Brill. ISBN 978-90-04-08554-1.
- Chilton, Bruce; Evans, Craig A. (1998). Studying the Historical Jesus: Evaluations of the State of Current Research. BRILL. ISBN 978-90-04-11142-4.
- Creed, John Martin (Oct 1932). "The Slavonic Version of Josephus' History of the Jewish War". The Harvard Theological Review. 25 (4): 277–319. doi:10.1017/S0017816000021301. S2CID 162926700.
- Davies, William David, ed. (2000). The Cambridge History of Judaism, Vol. 3: The Early Roman Period. Cambridge University Press. ISBN 978-0-521-24377-3.
- Kaminsky, Joel S. (1997). Maier, Paul L. (ed.). Josephus: The Essential Works. Grand Rapids, Mich.: Kregel Publications. p. 416. doi:10.2307/3169705. ISSN 0009-6407. JSTOR 3169705. S2CID 162250694.
- Feldman, Louis H.; Hata, Gōhei (1989). Josephus, the Bible, and history. Brill. ISBN 978-90-04-08931-0.
- Flavius Josephus; Leeming, Henry; Osinkina, Lyubov V.; Leeming, Katherine (2003). Josephus' Jewish War and Its Slavonic Version: A Synoptic Comparison of the English Translation by H. St. Thackeray with the Critical Edition by N.A. Meščerskij of the Slavonic Version in the Vilna Manuscript Translated into English by H. Leeming and L. Osinkina. Leiden: Brill. ISBN 978-90-04-11438-8.
- Flavius Josephus; Whiston, William; Maier, Paul L. (1999). The New Complete Works of Josephus. Kregel Academic. ISBN 978-0-8254-2948-4.
- Leeming, Kate (2016). "The Slavonic Version of Josephus's Jewish War". In Honora Howell Chapman; Zuleika Rodgers (eds.). A Companion to Josephus. Wiley Blackwell. pp. 390–401.
- Van Voorst, Robert E. (2000). Jesus Outside the New Testament: An Introduction to the Ancient Evidence. Wm. B. Eerdmans Publishing Co. ISBN 978-0-8028-4368-5.
- Wells, George Albert (1971). The Jesus of the early Christians. Pemberton Books. ISBN 978-0-301-71014-3.
- Zeitlin, Solomon (October 1948). "The Hoax of the 'Slavonic Josephus'". The Jewish Quarterly Review. New Series. 39 (2): 172–177. doi:10.2307/1452821. JSTOR 1452821.
