= Josippon =

Chronicle of Jewish history

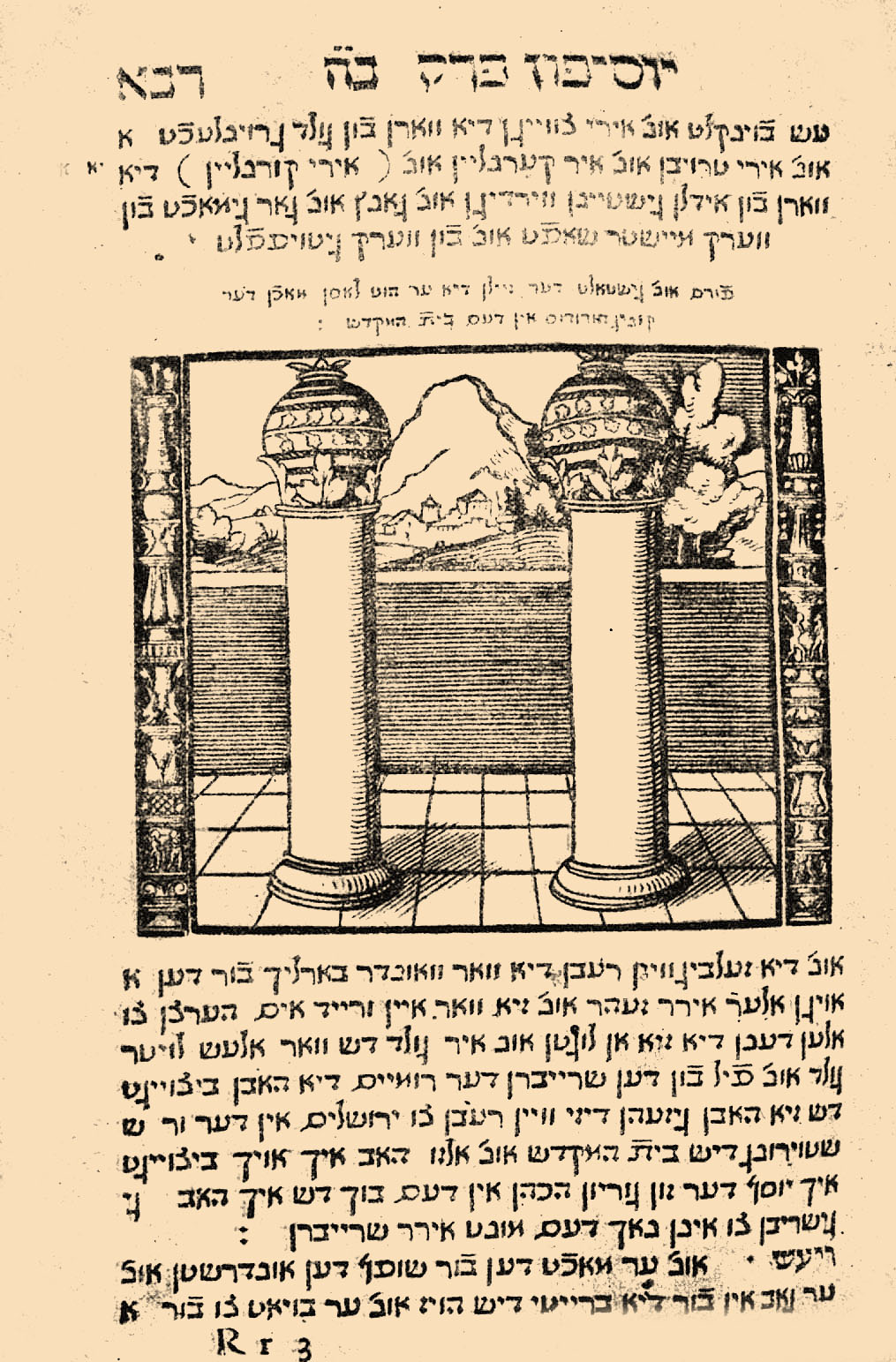
Josippon (1546)

The Book of Josippon, also called Sefer Yosippon (Hebrew: ספר יוסיפון), is one of the most influential medieval chronicles of Jewish history, translated into many languages and republished in many editions, and a landmark of Jewish national historiography. It is a history of the Roman Empire and its Jewish inhabitants from the biblical history of Adam to the age of Titus. The author writes that he is copying the works of Roman-Jewish historian Josephus to whom its name refers. It was composed in the 10th century in Byzantine Italy. The Ethiopic version of Josippon is recognized as canonical by the broader canon of the Ethiopian Orthodox Tewahedo Church and the Eritrean Orthodox Tewahedo Church. It is also part of the ancient Coptic Bible.

== History ==
The anonymous author of the work writes that he is copying from the writings of the old Jewish-Roman historian Josephus, whom the author calls Joseph ben Gorion (יוסף בן גוריון). The name Joseph is given the Greek ending on, resulting in the book's title Josephon, Joseppon, or Josippon. His Arabic name Yusibus is, according to Wellhausen, identical with "Hegesippus". A gloss gives the form from Italian Giuseppe. Trieber held the singular view that the author lived in the fourth century and derived much of his material from Hegesippus. In the Arabic and Yemenite translations, the author is called "Yusuf ibn Qaryun."

The earliest textual versions surviving today are from the Cairo Geniza, fragments dated to the 11th century. Shulamit Sela has proposed that the earliest version might have been only the material from the Book of Maccabees.

The Sefer Josippon was compiled in Hebrew early in the 10th century by a Jewish native of the Greek-speaking community of the Catepanate of Italy in Southern Italy, which was at that time part of the Byzantine Empire. The version edited and expanded by Yehudah ibn Moskoni (1328-1377), a Romaniote Jew from Ohrid, in the Balkan region, was printed in Constantinople in 1510 and translated to English in 1558. Moskoni was part of a Byzantine Greek-Jewish milieu that produced a number of philosophical works in Hebrew and a common intellectual community of Jews in the Mediterranean. Moskoni's version of Josippon became the most popular book published by Jews and about Jews for non-Jews, who ascribed its authenticity to the Roman Josephus, until the 20th century.

The first edition was printed in Mantua in 1476. The book subsequently appeared in many forms, one of the most popular being in Yiddish, with quaint illustrations. As the Muslim writer ibn Hazm (d. 1063) was acquainted with the Arabic translation by a Yemenite Jew, Daniel Chwolson proposes that the author lived at the beginning of the ninth century. Ibn Khaldun (1332-1406) 's Muqaddimah (1377) also contains a post-biblical Jewish history of the "Israelites in Syria" and he relied on Jewish sources, such as the Arabic translation of Josippon by Zachariah ibn Said, a Yemenite Jew, according to Khalifa (d. 1655). Saskia Dönitz has analyzed an earlier Egyptian version older than the version reconstructed by David Flusser, drawing on the work of a parallel Judaeo-Arabic Josippon by Shulamit Sela and fragments in the Cairo Geniza and the Genizat Germania, which indicate that Josippon is a composite text redacted several times.

Josippon was also a popular work or a volksbuch, and had further influence such as its Latin translation by Christian Hebraist Sebastian Münster which was translated into English by Peter Morvyn, a fellow of Magdalen College in Oxford and a Canon of Lichfield, printed by Richard Jugge, printer to the Queen in England, and according to Lucien Wolf its popularity may have played a role in the eventual resettlement of the Jews in England. Munster also translated the historical work of ibn Daud which was included with Morwyng's edition. Steven Bowman notes that Josippon is an early work that inspired Jewish nationalism and had a significant influence on midrashic literature and talmudic chroniclers as well as secular historians, though considered aggadah by mainstream Jewish thought, and acted as an ur-text for 19th century efforts in Jewish national history.

== Content ==
Commencing with Adam and the geographical conditions of the first millennium BCE, the author passes to the legendary history of Rome and Babylon, to the accounts of Daniel, Zerubbabel (according to the Apocrypha), the Second Temple, and Cyrus the Great, and to the histories of Alexander the Great and his successors. He then gives the history of the Jews down to the destruction of the Temple. The last part contains, among other things, a brief history of Hannibal and an account of the coronation of an emperor, which, according to Basnage refers to that of Otto I, Holy Roman Emperor (crowned 962); this would be the only and a most valuable source of information concerning this event. If Basnage's conjecture is correct, the date of the composition of the "Yosippon" may be placed at the end of the 10th century. "Yosippon" is written in comparatively pure Biblical Hebrew, shows a predilection for certain Biblical phrases and archaisms, and is rich in poetical passages and in maxims and philosophical speculations.

== Value as a historical source ==
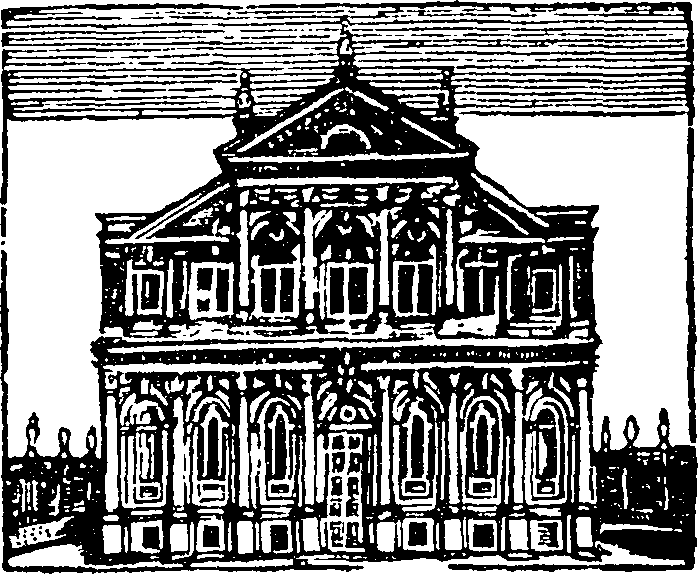
Printer's fleuron from 1706 edition of Josippon

Josippon was one of the most highly respected historical sources on Jewish history in the Middle Ages, and was frequently reprinted. It relies on Pseudo-Hegesippus, a Latin translator of Antiquities and Josephus's The Jewish War. The author had access to a decent library of material and drew on 1 Maccabees, 2 Maccabees, Jerome's translation of Eusebius, the Aeneid, Macrobius, Orosius, and Livy. Like its namesake and inspiration, the work commingles Roman history and Jewish history.

Joseph Justus Scaliger in his "Elenchus Trihæresii Nicolai Serarii" was the first to doubt its worth; Jan Drusius (d. 1609) held it to be historically valueless on account of its many chronological mistakes; Zunz and Delitzsch have branded the author as an impostor. Both the manuscripts and printed editions contain a number of historical errors, discrepancies or misinterpretations when compared to the original Josephus and other sources it drew upon, and subjective commentary from the author. But there is scarcely any book in Jewish literature that has undergone more changes at the hands of copyists and compilers; Judah ibn Moskoni knew of no less than four different compilations or abridgments. The later printed editions are one-third larger than the editio princeps of Mantua.

However, in modern times, Josippon was once again recognized as an important source in its own right. Josippon is considered a valuable source for certain topics, such as the Hasmonean dynasty and Jewish history in Italy and the Byzantine Empire, and it paraphrases much of Josephus. David Flusser and Steven Bowman wrote modern critical editions, and the latter considers it a mix of history and midrash.

== Literary criticism ==
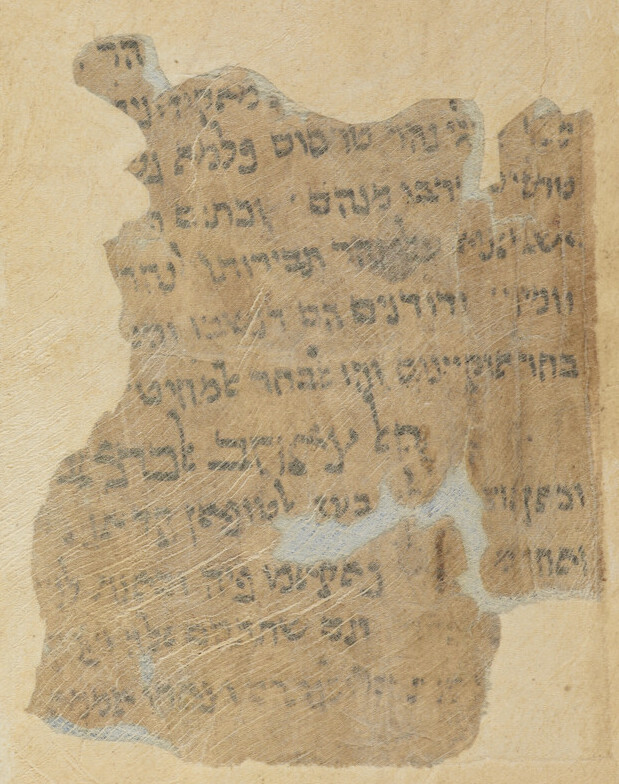
15-16th c. fragment of Josippon in Yemeni Judeo-Arabic from the Cairo Geniza, Add.1246 Cambridge University Library

Sebastian Münster's edition omits as not genuine the legendary introduction with its genealogical list, and also ch. lxvii. to the end, narrating Vespasian and Titus' expedition against Jerusalem. Azariah dei Rossi also recognized that the Alexander Romance of Pseudo-Callisthenes in a Hebrew translation had been smuggled into the first edition; and, following David Kimchi, Rapoport showed that the last chapter belonged to Abraham ibn Daud. Zunz has shown many other portions of the work to be Spanish additions, made in the twelfth century. Almost the whole account of Alexander the Great and his successors has been proved by Trieber to be of later origin. According to that critic, the part of the work original with its author ended with ch. lv. (the dedication of Herod's Temple), more or less of the remainder being taken from Pseudo-Hegesippus, and perhaps added as early as the 5th century. This would explain the numerous contradictions and style-differences between these two parts.

There remains, as the nucleus of the whole chronicle, a history of the Second Temple, beginning with the apocryphal stories concerning Daniel, Zerubbabel, etc., and finishing with the restoration of the Temple under Herod. A copyist of Pseudo-Hegesippus, however, identified the "Joseph ben Gorion" (Josephum Gorione Genitum), a prefect of Jerusalem, mentioned in iii. 3, 2 et seq., with the historian Josephus ben Mattithiah, at this time governor of the troops in Galilee. This may account for the fact that the chronicle was ascribed to Joseph b. Gorion.

Julius Wellhausen, agreeing with Trieber, denies that the genuine part has any historical value whatever. Trieber contends that the author did not draw his information directly from Josephus or from the Second Book of Maccabees, as is usually believed, and as Wellhausen maintains. He believes that both II Maccabees and the "Yosippon" used the work of Jason of Cyrene, and Josephus and the "Yosippon" that of Nicholas of Damascus.

The book emphasized national pride rather than religious devotion. It was the first time that the biblical phrase "like sheep to the slaughter" was inverted and used in opposition to pacifist martyrdom: contrary to previous accounts, Matityahu was credited as having said, "Be strong and let us be strengthened and let us die fighting and not die as sheep led to the slaughter" during the Maccabean Revolt.

== Editions ==
1. The first edition of the "Yosippon" was published in Mantua by Abraham Conat (1476–79), who also wrote a preface to it. Other editions are:
2. Constantinople, 1510; arranged and enlarged, with a preface by Tam ibn Yahya ben David. It is borrowed to a great extent from that of Judah Leon ben Moses Mosconi (b. 1328), published in Otzar Ṭob, 1878, i. 017 et seq. The text in this edition is divided into ninety-seven chapters.
3. Basel, 1541; with a Latin preface, and a translation from the text of the editio princeps, by Sebastian Münster. The edition, however, contains only chapters iv. to lxiii.; the remaining chapters have been translated into Latin by David Kyberus (Historia Belli Judaici, in De la Bigne's Bibliotheca Patrum, Paris).
4. Venice, 1544; reprinted from the Constantinople edition, as were all the following editions.
5. Cracow, 1588 and 1599.
6. Frankfort-on-the-Main, 1689.
7. Gotha, 1707 and 1710; with Münster's preface and a Latin translation and notes by Friedrich Breithaupt. Other editions appeared at Amsterdam (1723), Prague (1784), Warsaw (1845 and 1871), Zhitomir (1851), and Lvov (1855).

As of 2025 the most recent modern critical edition, translated into English, is by Bowman:

- Bowman, Steven B., ed. (2023). Sepher Yosippon: a tenth-century history of Ancient Israel. Raphael Patai Series in Jewish Folklore and Anthropology. Detroit: Wayne State University Press. ISBN 978-0-8143-4945-8.

== Translations and compilations ==
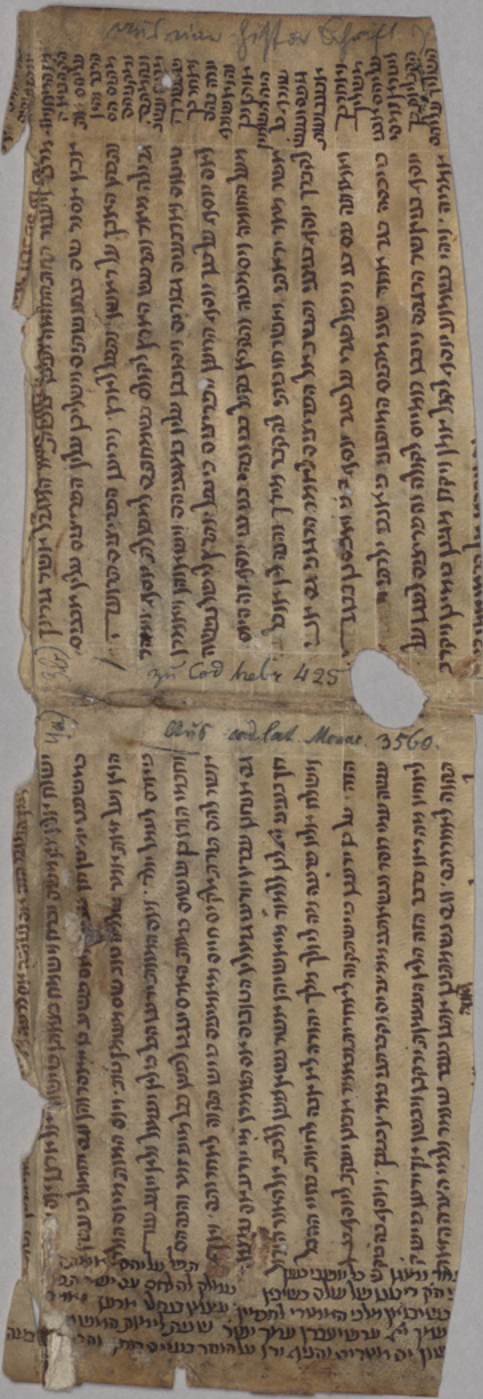
Genizat Germania fragment of Josippon. münchen, staats- und universitätsbibliothek 153/Viii 4r/3v

A Yiddish translation with illustrations was published by Michael Adam (Zürich, 1546; Prague, 1607; Amsterdam, 1661); it was later revised by Menahem ben Solomon ha-Levi, and published under the title Keter Torah (Amsterdam, 1743). Another Latin translation, with Tam ibn Yahya's preface, was published by Joseph Gagnier (Oxford, 1706); a French translation of Kyberus' Latin supplement by F. de Belleforest was published in Gilbert Génébrard's French translation of Josephus (Paris, 1609). An abstract was made in southern Italy, about 1150, by Jerahmeel ben Solomon and the translation of a portion by Moses Gaster, in The Chronicles of Jerahmeel. Another abstract, made in 1161 by Abraham ibn Daud and used as the third book of his Sefer Seder ha-Qabbalah was published (Mantua, 1513; Venice, 1545; Basel, 1580, etc.), with Münster's Latin translation, at Worms (1529) and Basel (1559).

An English translation of this abstract was made by Peter Morvyn (London, 1558, 1561, 1575, 1608). A Yiddish compendium by Edel bat Moses was published in Kraków in 1670; the oldest German extract, under the title "Joseppi Jüdische Historien" (author not known) is described in Wolf, "Bibl. Hebr." (iii. 389). Some short extracts, in German, are given in Joseph Zedner, Auswahl aus Hebräischen Schriftstellern (pp. 16 et seq.), and in Winter and Wünsche, Die Jüdische Litteratur. (iii. 310 et seq.).

In November 2022, Bowman released his English translation of Sepher Yosippon, which is a translation of David Flusser's critical edition of the text.
