= Robert Eisler =

Austrian art historian and polymath (1882–1949)

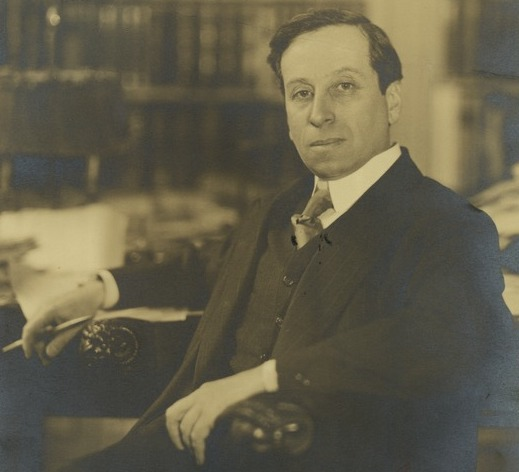
- Born: 27 April 1882; Vienna, Austria-Hungary
- Died: 17 December 1949 (aged 67); Oxted, England
- Known for: Scholar of art history, philosophy, history of religions, economics, anthropology, and philology.
- Spouse: Rosalie Stefanie Von Pausinger

Robert Eisler (27 April 1882 – 17 December 1949) was an Austrian Jewish polymath who wrote about the topics of mythology, comparative religion, the Gospels, monetary policy, art history, history of science, psychoanalysis, politics, astrology, history of currency, and value theory. He lectured at the Sorbonne and Oxford, served briefly on the International Committee on Intellectual Cooperation in Paris after World War I, and spent fifteen months imprisoned in Dachau and Buchenwald, where he developed heart disease. He is best remembered today for advancing a new picture of the historical Jesus based on his interpretation of the Slavonic Josephus manuscript tradition, proposing a dual currency system to control inflation, and arguing for a prehistoric derivation of human violence in Man into Wolf: An Anthropological Interpretation of Sadism, Masochism, and Lycanthropy. His life and work intersected with those of Sigmund Freud, Carl Jung, Alois Riegl, Gilbert Murray, Karl Popper, Hugo von Hofmannsthal, G. R. S. Mead, Aby Warburg, Fritz Saxl, Gershom Scholem, Oskar Goldberg, Martin Buber, and Walter Benjamin.

== Life ==
=== Early life and education ===
Eisler was born in Vienna on 27 April 1882. After gymnasium, Eisler attended the University of Vienna, where he received his first doctorate in economics. In 1902, he published Studien zur Werttheorie (Studies on Value Theory, 1902), a collection of five essays belonging to "The Second Austrian School of Value Theory", associated with his teachers Christian von Ehrenfels and Alexius Meinong. Around 1904 he traveled through the Mediterranean visiting museums and archaeological sites. When he returned to Austria in 1905, he took a second doctorate in Art History under Alois Riegl and Franz Wickhoff at the University of Vienna Institute of Art History. In 1908, Eisler converted to Roman Catholicism in order to marry Rosalia "Lili" von Pausinger, an Austrian baroness and the daughter of the landscape painter Franz von Pausinger.

=== Attempted Art Theft in 1907 ===
On 9 June 1907, during a trip to Italy, Eisler visited the library of the Archbishop’s Palace in Udine to photograph some codices. After Eisler had finished taking photographs and left, the librarian noticed that a fifteenth century codex called the Virginis et Passionis was missing and called the authorities to report the theft. The police picked up Eisler for questioning, and while he was being held at the station he grabbed a pen knife from a desk and stuck it into his throat, but the wound was superficial. Upon confessing to the theft, Eisler was confined to await trial and, as a foreigner, he was held without bail. In his jail cell one night, Eisler broke a bottle of disinfectant and tried to slash his left wrist with a shard of glass. This wound, too, was stitched up by a doctor, who also diagnosed Eisler with malaria. At his trial, in which Hugo von Hoffmannsthal testified as a character witness, Eisler confessed to having taken the codex and was ultimately allowed to pay his court costs and avoid jail time so that his family could take him to a sanitarium in nearby Gorizia.

=== Service in World War I ===
From 1914 until 1917 Eisler served as an officer in Austria-Hungary’s 59th "Erzherzog Rainer" Infantry Regiment, and was awarded the silver medal and was made a knight of both the Order of Francis Joseph and the Iron Cross.

=== Connections to the Warburg Circle in Hamburg ===
Eisler’s contacts with the "Hamburg School" of art history, which included Aby Warburg and Fritz Saxl and the philosopher Ernst Cassirer, began in the early 1920s. During this period, Eisler also introduced Gershom Scholem to Warburg’s circle. On 3 December 1922, Eisler went to Hamburg to give a paper titled "Orphische und altchristliche Kultsymbolik" ("Orphic and Early Christian Cult Symbolism") at the Bibliothek Warburg and received spontaneous applause at the end of his lecture. Warburg himself was taking a leave of absence, having suffered a nervous breakdown in 1918. It was Saxl, Warburg’s secretary who had read Orpheus the Fisher and invited Eisler. As they were setting the date, Eisler began to try Saxl’s patience with his frequent requests: before he had even arrived, Eisler wanted to set up two more lectures, one on ancient seafaring and another on the history of money, the latter being an area of his scholarship that he seemed convinced would be of special interest to Warburg, whose brothers were major figures in the world of finance. In 1925 Saxl published Eisler’s Orphisch-dionysische Mysterien-Gedanken in der christlichen Antike (Orphic-Dionysian Mystery Thought in Early Christianity) in the Vorträge der Bibliothek Warburg (Warburg Library Lectures). Writing from the Bellevue Clinic in Kreuzlingen, Warburg, who was much concerned with professionalism and distinguishing himself from the amateur scholars of his day, vehemently opposed Eisler’s invitation. He later complained about Eisler's excessive "chutzpah" and insisted that he did not want to attract "such people" and provide "a stage for immodest dilettantes." At the time, Warburg was suffering from severe depression and was subject to "terrible tantrums and phobias, obsessions and delusions which ultimately made him a danger to himself and his surroundings and lead to his confinement in a closed ward." In 1924, having recovered from his breakdown, Warburg sought Eisler’s help with his own work and corresponded with him on the topic of the Zoroastrian god Zurvan. When Warburg died in 1929, Eisler asked to write his obituary for a scholarly journal. And upon his own death, Eisler’s widow donated most of his papers to the Warburg Institute’s archive.

=== Diplomatic and Scholarly Work in Paris ===
In 1925, with the recommendation of the classicist Gilbert Murray, Eisler took a diplomatic post in Paris as a deputy chief of the Institut International de Cooperation Intellectuelle (International Institute of Intellectual Cooperation) which had been created at the invitation of the French government to work with the League of Nations’ International Commission on Intellectual Cooperation. However, Eisler accepted the position and moved into a large rented apartment in Paris without first obtaining the permission of the Austrian government, who lodged a complaint with the League of Nations. While in Paris, Eisler received a visit from Scholem and Walter Benjamin. Scholem later described the encounter:

"The visit we paid Eisler in the deserted rooms of his luxury apartment—the "official people" had already disassociated themselves from him—was a depressing experience for us. Eisler, however, cheerfully discussed his discoveries about the person and role of Jesus as the leader of a political revolt. We realized we were witnessing a sad turning point in the life of an unusual human being."

While in Paris, Eisler gave lectures on the Slavonic Josephus manuscript, a version of Josephus's The Jewish War that Eisler argued was translated by a “Judaisizing heretic” from a lost Greek version of an unattested Aramaic original, and was therefore free from the Christian censorship coloring every other version of the text. In a letter to The Times of 17 April 1926, Eisler laid out the new narrative of Jesus’s ministry and death that the reconstructed manuscripts described:

There is no doubt now that the triumphal entry of Jesus into Jerusalem and the "cleansing" of the Temple were considered by Jews, as well as by Romans, as a revolutionary rising against the Roman government… Yet it is very important to see that even this hostile and prejudiced statement does not imply an accusation that Jesus started this rising against the Roman army of occupation, but admits that He was urged by His zelotic followers upon the path which led to the conscious self-sacrifice on the Cross.

This argument became the basis for a two-volume work in German, ΙΗΣΟϒΣ ΒΑΣΙΛΕϒΣ Οϒ ΒΑΣΙΛΕϒΣΑΣ: Messianische Unabhängigkeitsbewegung vom Auftreten Johannes des Täufers bis zum Untergang Jakobs des Gerechtenn ach der neuerschlossenen Eroberung von Jerusalem des Flavius Josephus und den christlichen Quellen (Jesus, the King Who Did Not Reign: The Messianic Independence Movement from the Appearance of John the Baptist to the Downfall of Jacob the Righteous after the Newly Discovered "Conquest of Jerusalem" by Flavius Josephus and the Christian Sources, 1929-30). A year later he published a shorter English edition titled The Messiah Jesus and John the Baptist According to Flavius Josephus’ Recently Rediscovered 'Capture of Jerusalem' and Other Jewish and Christian Sources (1931).

=== Congressional and Parliamentary Testimony on Monetary Reform ===
In the early 1930s, as the world was suffering the Great Depression, Eisler turned his attention back to economics, the subject in which he earned his first doctorate. With a plan to reverse inflation and stave off future financial crises, he wrote three books for popular audiences on how to reform the banking system: This Money Maze: A Way Out of the Economic World Crisis (1931), Stable Money (1932), and, with economist Alec Wilson, The Money Machine: A Simple Introduction to the Eisler Plan (1933). Eisler drew on an historical practice from the Italian Renaissance called "banco-money" to argue for a dual currency system that would create an effective negative interest rate by removing the zero lower bound. Eisler presented this system to the British Parliamentary Finance Committee Review in 1932 and the U.S. Congress’s Committee on Banking and Currency in 1934, where he argued that if Great Britain and the United States both adopted his plan, "they could completely revolutionize the world and achieve such prosperity and such wealth as cannot be dreamed of under present circumstances." Neither government implemented his plan.

=== Connections to Eranos ===
In 1935 Eisler was invited to give a lecture on lecturing about the identity of the author of the Fourth Gospel at the Eranos conference, which marked the beginning of his connection to Carl Jung. Jung had already been reading Eisler and went on to cite his work on Orphic symbolism in his 1935 essay "Dream Symbols and the Individuation Process" and subsequently in a lecture series on Nietzsche’s Thus Spoke Zarathustra. The 1935 edition of the Eranos Jahrbuch (Eranos Yearbook) published the paper he had presented in the form of an essay titled "Das Rätsel des Johannesevangeliums" ("The Riddle of the Gospel of John"). Eranos founder Olga Fröbe-Kapteyn reported to Jung that one of her cats had allowed Eisler to witness her birthing a litter, which had raised him in her estimation. Another Eranos attendee, Ernst Robert Curtius, called Eisler "a real aufklärer [enlightener]" and commented: "[Eisler] showed with uncanny clarity, where the cold dialectic of the white man’s intellect leads—to a petrifaction, a rigor mortis of the world as a concept. What remains is the inner malaise of Solomonic world-weariness."

=== Imprisonment in Dachau and Buchenwald ===
Following the Anschluss in March 1938, Eisler wrote to Oxford asking about being appointed to the Wilde Readership in Comparative and Natural Religion, thereby gaining a way out of Nazi-controlled Europe. Gilbert Murray stepped in and secured him the Oxford post, which he was to have taken in October and held for three years. But on 20 May Eisler was arrested and sent to Dachau under "protective custody" as prisoner 16547. Lili Eisler stayed behind in Unterach am Attersee, trying to get her husband released. Because she refused to divorce him, her inherited properties in Salzburg and Upper Austria were confiscated. Eisler was eventually transferred to Buchenwald on 22 September 1938. At Buchenwald, prisoners worked from first light until dark and in 1938 and 1939, when Eisler was there, they were often made to work after dinner until one in the morning under floodlights. Eisler later reported having been confined to "the solitary confinement of the 'black bunker.'" His fellow Austrian Jewish scholar, Heinrich E. Jacob, author of a landmark 1944 study of the history of baking and bread, was confined along with Eisler in the camps. In the acknowledgements section of his book, Jacobs thanks him directly, writing, "I also wish to thank my friend Robert Eisler, historian of religion, who in the dark days of Dachau and Buchenwald, kept awake my hope to finish and to publish this book." In September 1939, Eisler wrote to a friend about his time in the camps:

[It] may interest you that I have had some very fruitful and comforting discussions with one highly educated and intelligent member of the primitive Christian adventist community of the so-called Biblical Scientists, the members of which are mostly in the German concentration camps (about 500 in Buchenwald) and more cruelly treated even than the Jews because they believe Hitler to be the foretold Anti-Christ, the Kingdom of God as a political organisation to be realized here on earth as a reign of justice and loving kindness and because they refuse military service. I was greatly surprised to learn that this man who had studied Hebrew and Greek as well as theology in order to be a preacher and teacher among his brethren (they have no clergy) should have read my German ΙΗΣΟϒΣ ΒΑΣΙΛΕϒΣ and derived from it what he felt to be the strongest possible confirmation of his own and [the founder of the sect] Judge Rutherford’s interpretation of the gospels!

=== Last Years in England ===
After his release, Eisler made his way to England via Italy and Switzerland and arrived in September 1939 to find that Oxford had appointed the Anglo-Catholic philosopher and historian of religion Edwin Oliver James to the readership in his absence. At first, Eisler was assured that James, a full professor at Leeds, would step down now that Eisler had arrived, since "no Englishman would profit [from] such a situation." But James, Englishman though he was, declined to give up his post, and so the university made a concession to Eisler, allowing him to deliver his scheduled 1938 lectures on "the pre-Hellenic populations of Crete and the Aegean" in the Michaelmas terms of 1939 and 1940, and to receive a stipend of £156. Eisler and Lili, who arrived in June 1940, stayed with a series of friends until Lili found work as a cook in return for modest lodging and bus fare for her husband’s one day a week in the library. The same month his wife finally joined him in England, Eisler was sent to another prison camp, this time by the British government, who had begun interning Jewish refugees on the Isle of Man. He was released in September due to his heart trouble.

The 1940s were years of frustration for Eisler. His body was badly damaged by his fifteen months in the camps, probably compounded by earlier war injuries and the long-term effects of malaria. He was suffering angina pectoris as well as severe pain in his hands and shoulders from bone degeneration, and he may have developed diabetes. In this state, Eisler tried to earn a living with a scattering of essays and lectures and occasional employment as a financial consultant or tutor. For extra money and when his health allowed, he sometimes worked stoking the boiler in his building. He applied for funding for a series of lectures on the fourth gospel from The Hibbert Trust, a Unitarian endowment that offered grants to those seeking to "contribute to the education, knowledge or understanding of Unitarianism or liberal religion." It was denied, prompting him to angrily accuse the board of bias against non-Christians. In 1942 Eisler proposed to the BBC a broadcast reading of his reconstruction of Ecclesiastes for Ash Wednesday. It was likewise rejected. In 1946 he approached them once more with the same proposal and when he was rebuffed this time, he again claimed religious discrimination and, unsuccessfully, took his case to the Joint Committee on Matters of Religious Liberty.

In September 1941, Esther Simpson, secretary of the Society for the Protection of Science and Learning, wrote a one-paragraph note to Eisler asking about his current employment so that she could update the Society’s records. Two days later, she received four pages covered front and back with crabbed handwriting detailing Eisler’s many indignities, humiliations, and rejections since coming to England. On the last page is written:

If the Society wanted to do something, one would think that something could be done to alleviate one’s feelings of being utterly useless and unwelcome. I have therefore decided to give you an exact survey of the facts, although I feel sure that the only result will be to convince you more than ever that I am a very square peg impossible to fit into any of the well-rounded and polished but rather narrow holes available in this country… I have arranged with the Oxford professor of anatomy who has very kindly undertaken to utilise for teaching purposes and the benefit of science what I shall leave here when I finally depart from this queer world and thus to relieve my guarantors from what I understand might be a final expenditure of at least [£40] to close my account.

Despite his obvious depression and failing health, Eisler was still remarkably productive in the 1940s and producing some of his best work. He was lecturing throughout London on a wide variety of topics, including "The Philosophic Basis of Modern Physics." 1946 saw the appearance of the lavishly illustrated The Royal Art of Astrology, drawn from some of his earlier work in Weltenmantel und Himmelszelt and motivated partly by Eisler’s fear that astrological newspaper columns were encouraging "totalitarian dictatorship and abject mass servitude to an alleged fatality." That same year, after eight years of silence, he sent a 250-page manuscript to Scholem outlining his plan to implement Zionism and solve the Palestine problem with

a committee consisting of three Anglican theologians and three strictly Orthodox rabbis to rule on the credentials of all Jews living in Palestine. Those who were not deemed kosher enough to be allowed to remain in the country as pious worshippers were to be given the choice of returning to their countries of origin or (if they wanted a Jewish state) of taking possession of the second district of Vienna (the Leopoldstadt) as well as the entire city of Frankfurt am Main; these territories were to be evacuated by the Germans and placed under international guarantees as a Jewish state.

Scholem mailed it back with the one-word reply, "Genug" (“enough"), and they never spoke again.

In 1948, he delivered a lecture to the Royal Society of Medicine that was later published as Man into Wolf: An Anthropological Interpretation of Sadism, Masochism, and Lycanthropy. Robert Eisler died on 18 December 1949, reportedly with the essay he was finishing, "The Passion of the Flax," at his bedside. There were two obituaries in The Times. The second one, written by his friend Cyril Goldsmid (the scion of a powerful Anglo-Jewish family) describes him as "possessed of encyclopedic knowledge," but "entirely devoid of intellectual arrogance."

== Works ==
- Studien zur Werttheorie (1902) The Theory Of Values
- Die Legende vom heiligen Karantanerherzog Domitianus, Mitteilungen des Instituts für österreichische Geschichtsforschung 28, Innsbruck 1907
- Die illuminierten Handschriften in Kärnten (1907)
- Weltenmantel und Himmelszelt, two volumes (1910) Internet Archive link (vol. 1 only)
- Die Kenitischen Weihinschriften der Hyksoszeit (1919)
- Orpheus the Fisher: Comparative Studies in Orphic and Christian Cult Symbolism (1921)
- Das Geld (1924)
- Orphisch-Dionysische Mysteriengedanken in der christlichen Antike (1925)
- Iesous Basileus ou Basileusas, two volumes (1929/30)
- The Messiah Jesus and John the Baptist (1931) pdf link
- This Money Maze (1931)
- Stable Money (1932)
- Monetary Theory and Monetary Policy (1934)
- Zur Kritik der psychologistischen Konjunktur-Theorie (1935)
- Das Rätzel des vierten Evangeliums (1936) as The Enigma of the Fourth Gospel (1938)
- Flavius Josephus Studien (1938)
- The Royal Art of Astrology (London 1946)
- Una Tavoletta di Biccherna Nuovamente Scoperta (1950)
- Man Into Wolf: An Anthropological Interpretation of Sadism, Masochism and Lycanthropy (1951)
- Comparative Studies In Ancient Cosmology (never published)
