= Morwen =

Morwen may refer to:

== People ==
- Morwen Thistlethwaite, knot theorist and professor of mathematics
- Peter Morwen, 16th century English cleryman

== Characters ==
- Morwen Eledhwen, the wife of Húrin and the mother of his children in J. R. R. Tolkien's Middle-earth legendarium
- Morwen Steelsheen, the mother of King Théoden of Rohan in J. R. R. Tolkien's The Lord of the Rings
- an original character in The Lord of the Rings film trilogy
- a playable character in the 2004 video game The Lord of the Rings: The Third Age
- a character in the Enchanted Forest Chronicles novel series by Patricia C. Wrede

== See also ==
- Morwenna
