= Grigorije Vasilije =

Monk Grigorije
- Born: c. 1550
- Died: after 1598
- Occupations: Monk, Scholar, Translator
- Known for: Transcribing and translating the Slavonic Josephus into Serbian vernacular
- Notable work: The History of the Jewish War (Serbian recension)

Monk Grigorije also known as Grigorije Vasilije (Serbian Cyrillic: Григорије Василије; c. 1550 - after 1598) was tonsured into the Great Schema in the Tower of Saint Sava at Karyes, Mount Athos, where he got his second name Vasilije. We have known him from a colophon in the Serbian recension of the Slavonic Josephus, "The History of the Jewish War". He transcribed and translated the Slavonic Josephus into Serbian vernacular at Karyes, the administrative center of Mount Athos, in 1585.

In addition, the Hilandar Monastery has preserved five petitions that hieromonk Grigorije in his frequent travels throughout Europe delivered to nobleman Nikita Romanov (the grandfather of the future tsar Michael of Russia) in April 1586; Andrej Jakovlević (two petitions written before 1582); Polish king Stephen Bathory; and Duke Andrey Kurbsky. Also, these documents have been published by the Moscow Main Archive of the Ministry of Foreign Relations.

According to records Grigorije Vasilije served as abbot of Hilandar in 1583, and multiple other occasions between 1588 and 1591 and continually from 1591 to 1598. He also traveled between the far-flung Athonite methos (including Imperial Russia) and their parent establishments on regular errands as alms collecting, property administration and Diplomatic missions on behalf of the secular and spiritual leaders where he stayed at the Moscow courts of Ivan the Terrible and Dionysius, Metropolitan of Moscow and their successors Fedor I of Russia and Patriarch Job of Moscow, years later. Upon his return voyage, Grogorije Vasilije traveled to Patriarchate of Peć in Ottoman-occupied Serbia to see his master Gerasim I and later the patriarch's successor Savatije I before resuming his trip back to Karyes, Mount Athos.

Ivan the Terrible's generosity shown to Serbian itinerant monk Grigorije and other Athonite monks accompanying him could be explained by the tsar’s own recognition of his Serbian royal lineage (through his mother) and the desire to strengthen relations between Russia and Serbia. Author Sreten Petković in "The Cultural Heritage of Serbia" attributes the presence of the 1564 fresco of Prince Lazar of Serbia in the Cathedral of the Archangel of the Moscow Kremlin to Tsar Ivan’s attachment to his Serbian roots. Additionally, the Church of the Archangel Michael contains depictions of Saint Sava, Saint Simeon, and the Byzantine emperor Michael VIII Palaeologos.
