= Man into Wolf =

Book by Robert Eisler

Man Into Wolf
- 1951 edition
- Author: Robert Eisler
- Language: English
- Genre: Anthropology, Jungian psychology, occult
- Publisher: Spring Books, London
- Publication date: 1948
- Publication place: United Kingdom
- Media type: Print (Hardcover and Paperback)

Man Into Wolf; An Anthropological Interpretation of Sadism, Masochism and Lycanthropy is a book by Robert Eisler, published in 1948. The text is based upon his readings in archeology and anthropology; anything not covered by these disciplines is then dealt with using Jungian methods of dream analysis and the theory of archetypes. For instance, his remarks concerning the nature of life in prehistory are largely derived from his interpretations of the dreams of psychotherapy patients.

== Subject matter ==
Eisler begins with an investigation into sadism and masochism which concludes that people seek not pleasure so much as strong sensations. Whether one seeks strong pleasurable sensations, unpleasurable ones, or some combination thereof depends on which group of apes one is descended from.

He asserts that humanity evolved from two groups of apes: one peaceful, vegetarian and practicing free love; the other violent, carnivorous and given to fighting over sex partners. Originally all were of the former group. However, Eisler argues that Ice Age food shortages caused some to imitate wolves and other beasts of prey, wearing animal skins and taking up hunting. He claims this is the historical basis of the werewolf legends found in many cultures.

Eisler advocates a return to what he imagines was the harmonious life of the earliest primates and proposes the development of a new psychology and ultimately a new society, lest we are destroyed in a nuclear war brought about by descendants of the wolf-men.
