= The Jewish War =

c. AD 75 book by Flavius Josephus

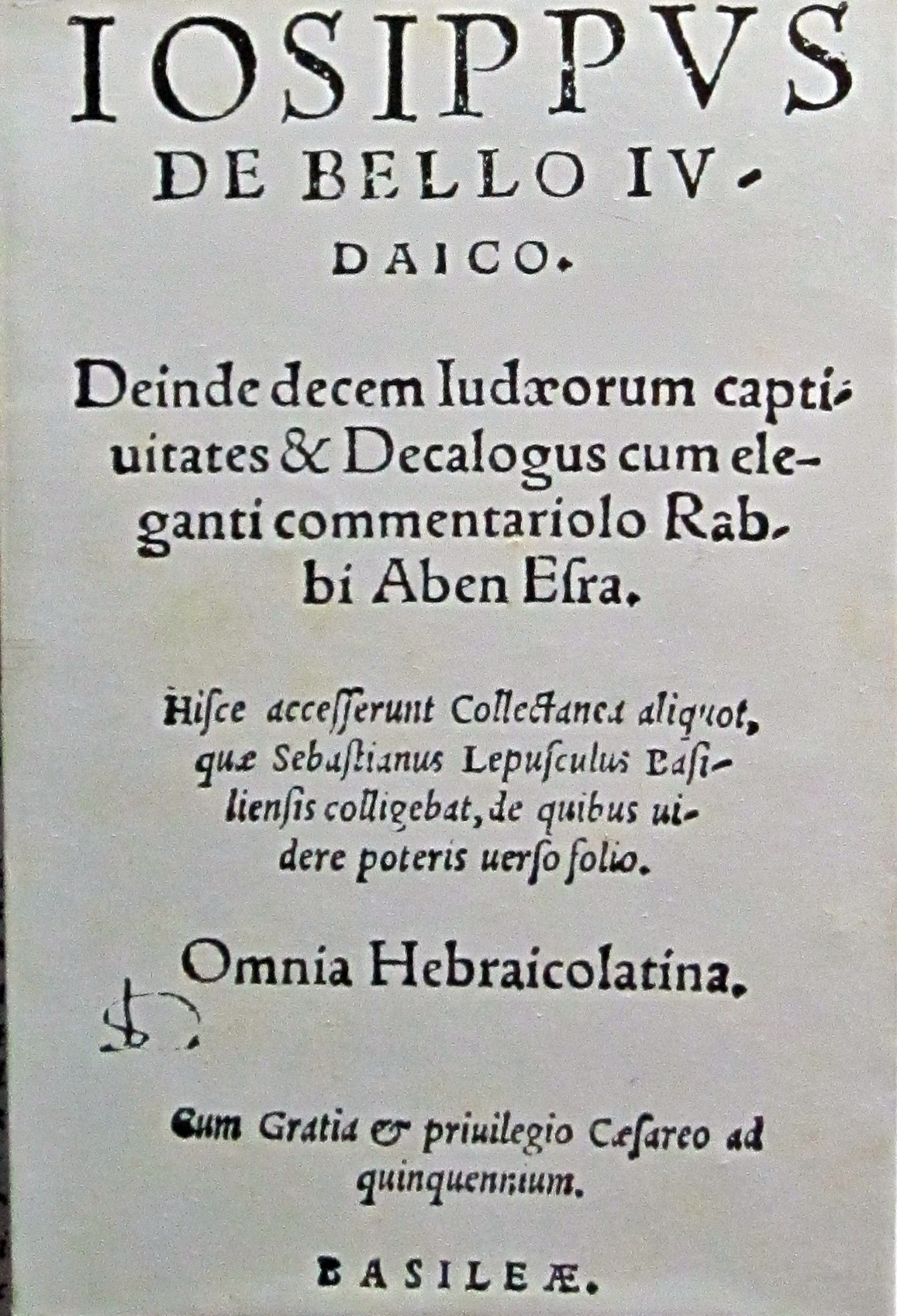
- Hebrew–Latin edition of The Jewish War (Basle, 1559)
- Author: Josephus
- Original title: Flavius Josephus's Books of the History of the Jewish War Against the Romans
- Language: Aramaic (lost), Greek
- Genre: History
- Publication date: c. AD 75
- Publication place: Roman Empire
- Followed by: Antiquities of the Jews

The Jewish War (Note: Also known as The Judean War, The Wars of the Jews, and Bellum Judaicum (in Latin).) (Note: In full: History of the Jewish War Against the Romans; Greek: Ἱστορία Ἰουδαϊκοῦ πολέμου πρὸς Ῥωμαίους, Ηistoria Ioudaikou polemou pros Rōmaious.) is a seven-book history of the First Jewish–Roman War (66–73 CE), written by the Jerusalem-born Jewish priest, military commander, and historian Josephus. A former commander of Jewish rebel forces in Galilee who later surrendered to and allied himself with the Roman general (and future emperor) Vespasian, Josephus composed the work in the late 70s CE. The narrative opens with a summary of Jewish history from the Maccabean Revolt through the reigns of the Hasmoneans, the Herodians, and the period of direct Roman rule. It then narrates in detail the revolt's outbreak, infighting among Jewish factions, the Roman military campaigns under Vespasian and his son Titus, and the eventual siege and destruction of Jerusalem and its Temple in 70 CE, concluding with the fall of the fortress of Masada in 73/74 CE.

Josephus writes that the work was first composed in his paternal tongue (either Aramaic or Hebrew) for Jewish audiences in the eastern diaspora, before he produced the surviving Greek version with the help of literary assistants. Because Josephus wrote under the patronage of the Flavian dynasty, historians have long debated the work's reliability, noting its tendency to place blame for the devastation on Jewish rebel factions. Nevertheless, the work expresses sympathy for Jewish suffering and defends Judaism to a Greco-Roman readership.

As the only extensive eyewitness narrative of the revolt to survive antiquity, The Jewish War is a foundational source for the late Second Temple period of Jewish history. It remains central to archaeological and historical study of sites such as Jerusalem, Yodfat, Gamla, and Masada. The text survives through the Christian manuscript tradition, and it has shaped later portrayals of the war, informing works such as Josephus's own Antiquities of the Jews as well as centuries of historiography on the fall of Jerusalem.

== Content ==
Divided into seven books, it opens with a summary of Jewish history from the capture of Jerusalem by the Seleucid emperor Antiochus IV Epiphanes in 168 BC to the first stages of the First Jewish–Roman War, books I and II. The next five books detail the unfolding of the war, under Roman generals Vespasian and Titus, to the death of the last Sicarii. The book was written about 75 AD, originally in Josephus' "paternal tongue" – either Aramaic or Hebrew – though this version has not survived. It was later translated into Greek, probably under the supervision of Josephus himself. Buth and Pierce wrote, "The current Greek edition does not appear to be a translation, but must be considered a new edition, a complete re-working of the first writing and likely a considerable expansion."

The sources of the First Jewish–Roman War are this account of Josephus, the Babylonian Talmud tractate Gittin 57b, Lamentations Rabbah, the Hebrew inscriptions on the First Jewish Revolt coinage, and Book V of Tacitus' Histories.

The text also survives in an Old Slavonic version, as well as Hebrew, which contains material not found in the Greek version and lacking other material in the Greek version.

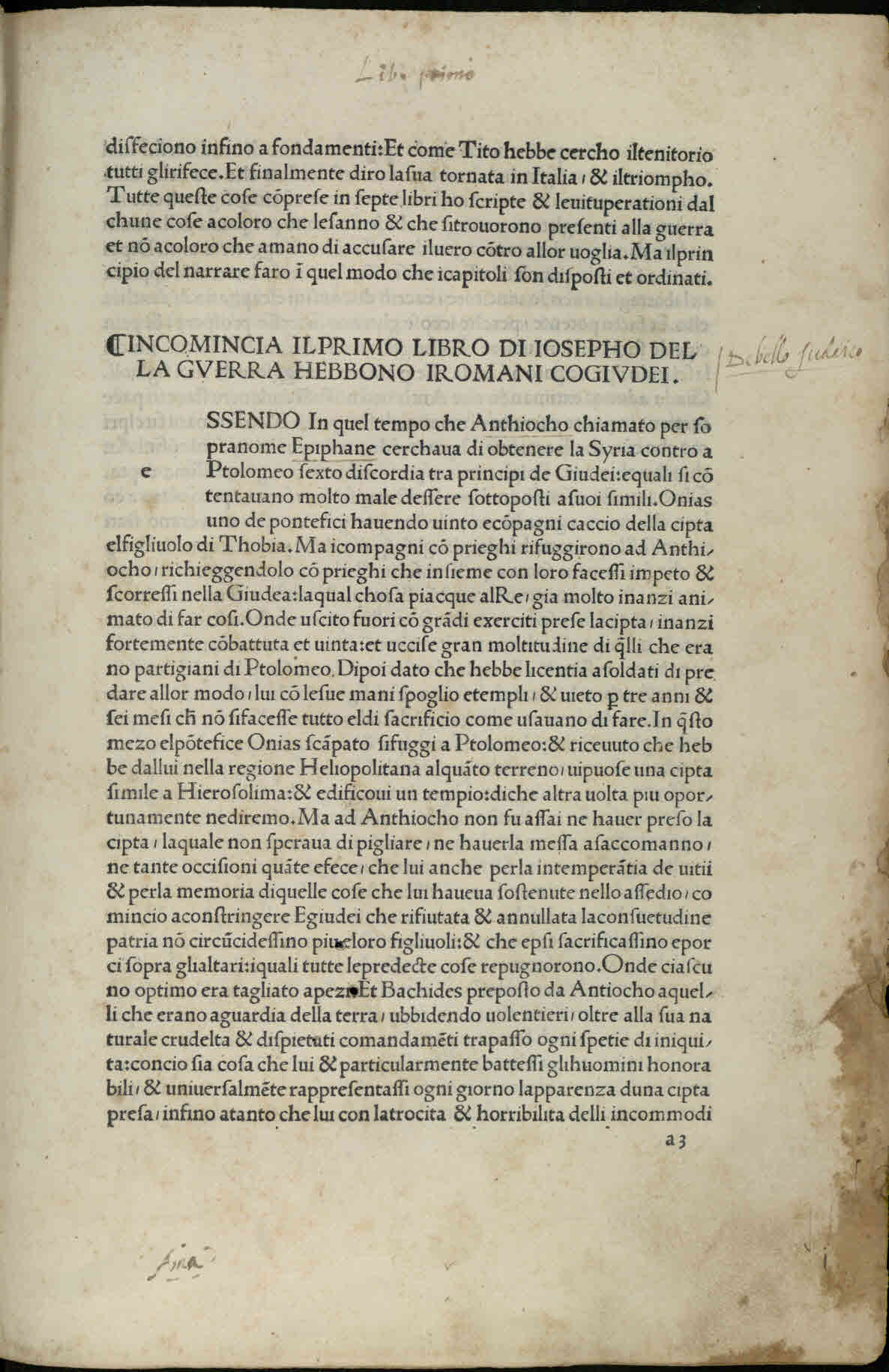
The Jewish War, 1493 Italian translation

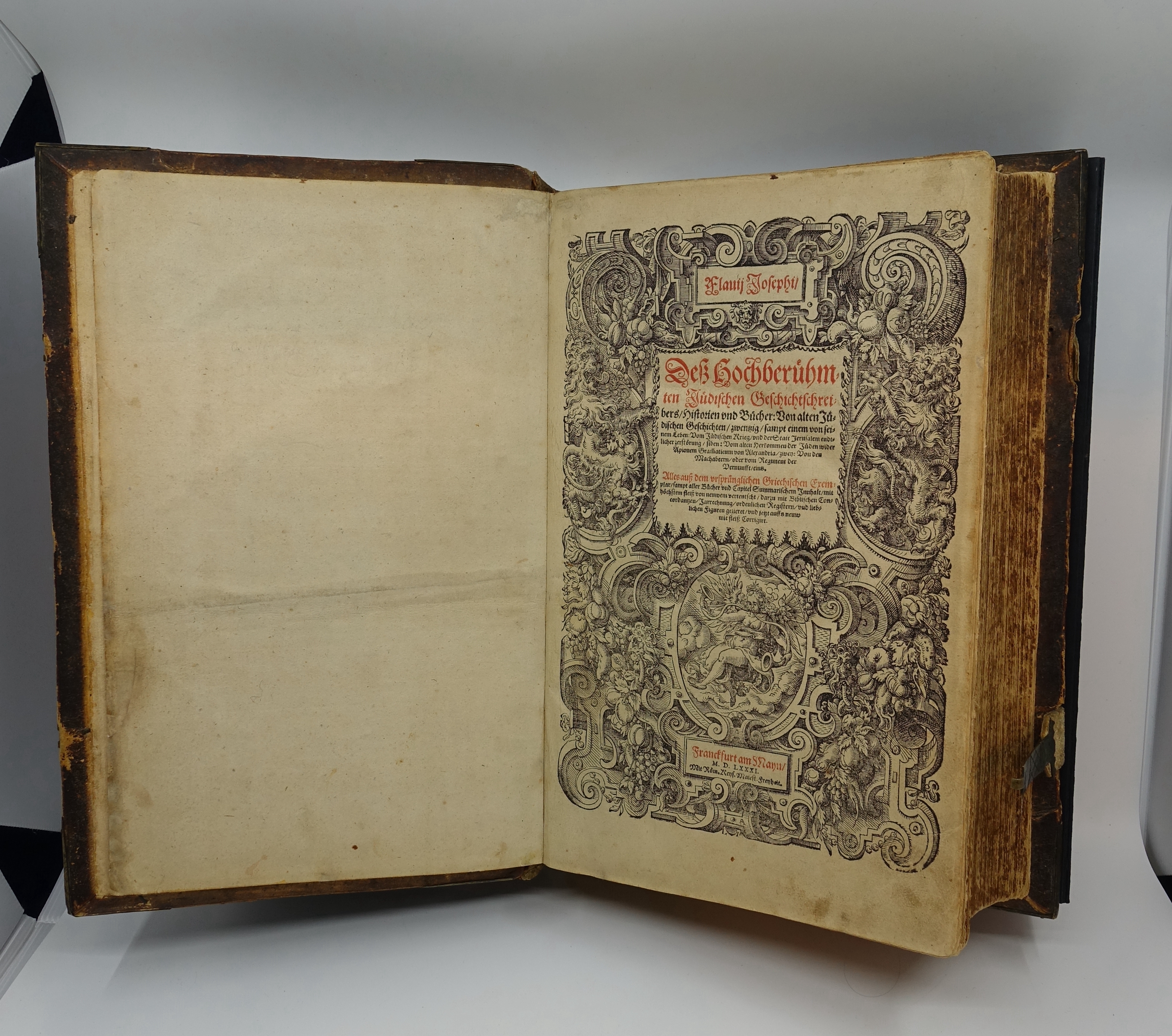
1581 German translation of Josephi’s The Jewish War in the collection of the Jewish Museum of Switzerland.

=== Mary of Bethezuba ===
Josephus recounts the story of Mary of Bethezuba, which describes cannibalism as a consequence of famine and starvation during the siege of Jerusalem. Josephus relates that there was a Mary, daughter of Eleazar originally from the village of Bethezuba in the district of Perea, east of the Jordan River, who had previously fled to Jerusalem. Distinguished in family and fortune, her property, treasures and food had been plundered by the Jewish defenders of the city during the siege. Famine was "eating her heart out, and rage consuming her still faster". Maddened by hunger she took the infant at her breast and said to him: "Poor little mite! In war, famine, and civil strife why should I keep you alive? With the Romans there is only slavery and that only if alive when they come; but famine is forestalling slavery, and the partisans are crueler than either. Come you must be food for me, to the partisans an avenging spirit, and to the world a tale, the only thing left to fill up the measure of Jewish misery". And in "defiance to all natural feeling" she killed her son, then roasted him and ate one half, hiding the rest.

Almost immediately the rebels appeared ("sniffing the unholy smell") and threatened to kill her on the spot unless she revealed what she had prepared. As she uncovered what was left of the child she offered them a share. They left her in horror and the "entire city could not stop thinking of this crime and abomination". When the news reached the Romans, "some refused to believe, some were distressed but on most the effect was to add enormously to their detestation" of the enemy at hand. Titus disclaimed all responsibility as he had repeatedly offered peace and amnesty for surrender.

== Influence ==
Josephus was a popular writer among Christians in the fourth century and beyond as an independent historian to the events before, during, and after the life of Jesus of Nazareth. Josephus was always accessible in the Greek-reading Eastern Mediterranean. The Jewish War was translated into Latin (Bellum Judaicum) in the fourth century by Pseudo-Hegesippus in abbreviated form as well as by an unknown other in full, and both versions were widely distributed throughout the Western Roman Empire and its successor states. Christian interest in The Jewish War was largely out of interest in the downfall of the Jews and the Second Temple, which was interpreted as divine punishment for alleged responsibility for Jesus' death. Improvements in printing technology (the Gutenberg Press) led to the work receiving a number of new translations into the vernacular languages of Europe; the original Greek text was also published in Basel in 1544. In English, the most influential translations were Thomas Lodge's 1602 translation (The Tragic History of the Jews), followed by William Whiston's 1760s translation (The Wars of the Jews).

On the Jewish side, Josephus was far more obscure, as he was perceived as a traitor. Rabbinical writings for a millennium after his death (e.g. the Mishnah) almost never call out Josephus by name, although they sometimes tell parallel tales of the same events that Josephus narrated. An Italian Jew writing in the 10th century indirectly brought Josephus back to prominence among Jews: he authored the Yosippon, which paraphrases Pseudo-Hegesippus's Latin version of The Jewish War (among other works), and included additional historical snippets at times. Jews generally distrusted Christian translations of Josephus until the 19th century, when sufficiently "neutral" vernacular language translations were made. Kalman Schulman finally created a translation of the Greek text of Josephus into Hebrew in 1863, although many rabbis continued to prefer the Yosippon version. By the 20th century, Jewish attitudes toward Josephus had softened, as Jews found parts of The Jewish War inspiring and favorable to the Jews. The last stand at Masada was seen as inspirational rather than tragic, for example. A 1938 / 1941 play, Jerusalem and Rome, was loosely based on The Jewish War, and various novels were written. These 20th century interpretations inevitably reflected the concerns of the era, unsurprisingly, such as the persecution of Jews in Russia and Nazi-era Europe, the nascent Zionist movement, and the situation of Jewish settlers in the British Mandate of Palestine.

For scholars, Josephus is and remains an invaluable resource for study of the Jewish-Roman war. While he is clearly deferential toward his Flavian dynasty Roman patrons, he is generally considered a relatively neutral source.

== See also ==
- Josephus
- Justus of Tiberias
- Gittin
- Lamentations Rabbah

== General and cited references ==
- Buth, Randall; Pierce, Chad (2014). "Hebraisti in Ancient Texts: Does ἑβραιστί Ever Mean 'Aramaic'?". In Buth, Randall; Notley, R. Steven (eds.). The Language Environment of First Century Judaea: Jerusalem Studies in the Synoptic Gospels. Jewish and Christian perspectives series no. 26. Vol. 2. Leiden, The Netherlands: Brill. pp. 66–109. ISBN 9789004263406. OCLC 865493517.
- The Jewish War: Revised Edition. ISBN 0-14-044420-3.
- H. Leeming and K. Leeming: "Josephus' 'Jewish War' and Its Slavonic Version: A Synoptic Comparison". Ancient Judaism & Early Christianity, Brill (1999). ISBN 90-04-11438-6.
- Pothou, Vassiliki (2023). Thukydides second-hand bei Flavius Josephus: zur Rezeption thukydideischer Motive im Bellum Judaicum. Leiden; Boston: Brill. ISBN 9789004545861.
