= Steven Bowman =

American historian

Steven B. Bowman is an American scholar and academic particularly known for his research of Greek and Jewish relations throughout the past three millennia, with emphasis on Byzantine and Holocaust periods. He is a professor of Judaic Studies at the University of Cincinnati, where he teaches a wide range of courses in ancient and medieval Judaic Studies and modern Israel.

== Biography ==
Bowman received his B.A. in history from the University of Massachusetts in 1964. In 1974 he completed his Ph.D. dissertation at Ohio State University on Byzantine Jewry during the Paeleologue period. He was appointed to the faculty of Judaic Studies in the University of Cincinnati in 1980, and became a full professor in 1990. Bowman published The Jews of Byzantium, 1204-1453 in 1985, followed by several books exploring the history of the Greek Jews during the Second World War. His fourth book, The Agony of Greek Jews, 1940-1945, was described by K.E. Fleming as one which "produced a careful and multilayered examination of Greek Jewry’s most devastating five years", was characterized by Nikos Tzafleris as "the most complete chronicle to date of the Holocaust of Greek Jewry" and by Aristotle Kallis as a "fascinating book" including a "complex set of stories relating to individuals, families, and entire communities". In 2011 Bowman finished his Annotated Translation of Sepher Yosippon, published in 2012 as the first book of the Hackmey Jewish Classics series at Harvard University. Bowman is the editor in chief of the Sephardi and Greek Holocaust Library that has published several Greek Holocaust memoirs and had edited many other books.

== Grants and awards ==
Beginning in 1971, Bowman has received numerous awards for his scholarship, three Fulbright Awards, two National Endowment for the Humanities awards, and numerous awards in the United States (including the Memorial Foundation for Jewish Culture, Littauer Foundation, and the Miles Lerner Fellow at The U.S. Holocaust Memorial Museum), England (Center for Advanced Jewish Studies at Oxford) and Israel (Postdoctoral) at the Hebrew University of Jerusalem and research and travel grants to Yad Vashem) and was a Gennadeion Fellow in Athens. For his sabbatical in 2010-2011 Bowman received a Fulbright-Hays Travel Abroad Award for research at Cambridge University and a Lady Davis Fellowship (Postdoctoral) at the Hebrew University of Jerusalem for work on a monograph about Sefer Yosippon. He has lectured widely nationally and internationally on various aspects of Greek Jews and their relations with Greeks, and is particularly interested in exploring Greek and Jewish nationalism.

== Professional activities ==
Bowman has been a visiting professor at New York University and the University of Massachusetts Amherst, a visiting lecturer at Haifa University and the University of California, San Diego. In 2010, Bowman was appointed a visiting professor at Wolfson College (Cambridge University) to work on Genizah fragments of Sefer Yosippon.

Bowman has been a member of the Medieval Academy of America since 1963; since 1983 he was a National Council Representative of the American Academic Association for Peace in the Middle East (APPME), and since 1981 he is President Emeritus of the Faculty Council of Jewish Affairs at the University of Cincinnati. Bowman has served on the editorial boards of the Journal of Hellenic Diaspora, Byzantine Studies/Etudes Byzantines and Shofar. Bowman has been a sometime member of a number of scholarly associations. He is also a member of the United States Byzantine Committee.

== Selected publications ==
=== Articles ===
- "A Corpus of Hebrew Epitaphs in Patras," Archaeologikon Deltion 31 (1976):49 74.
- Co authored with Ben Zion Wacholder, "Ezechielus the Dramatist and Ezekiel the Prophet: the Identification of the Mysterious Zoon in Ezechielus Exagoge," Harvard Theological Review 78 nos. 3 4 (1985):253 277.
- "Josephus in Byzantium," in L. Feldman and G. Hata, eds. Josephus, Judaism and Christianity (Wayne State University Press, 1987), pp. 362–385. Revised and expanded version of Japanese version in Josephan Studies II (Tokyo, 1985), pp. 262–276.
- "Sefer Yosippon: History and Midrash," in The Midrashic Imagination: Jewish Exegesis, Thought, and History, ed. by Michael Fishbane (SUNY Albany, 1993), pp. 280–294.
- "’Yosippon’ and Jewish Nationalism," Proceedings of the American Academy for Jewish Research, Vol. LXI (1995), 23-51.
- "Alexander and the Mysteries of India" The Journal of Indo-Judaic Studies, II (1999), 71-111.
- "Greek and Jewish Nationalism in the Balkans in the Early Nineteenth Century" in The Disintegration of the Ottoman World and the Fate of the Jews in Turkey and the Balkans (1808-1945), ed. Minna Rozen. Tel Aviv University, Diaspora Research Institute, 2002, 15-31.
- "Jews in Byzantium" for The Cambridge History of Judaism, Volume Four: The Late Roman-Rabbinic Period. Cambridge, 2006. pp 1035–1052.
- "Aqedah and Mashiah in Sepher Yosippon" European Journal of Jewish Studies 2 (2008), 21-43.
- "Shoah in Salonika" in The Holocaust: Essays and Documents, ed. Randolph L. Braham [CUNY Holocaust Studies Series, 2009], 11-30.
- "Jewish Responses to Byzantine Polemics 9th-11th Centuries" in The Jewish Jesus. Revelation, Reflection, Reclamation, ed. Zvi Garber (West Lafayette: Purdue University Press, 2011), 181-203.

Bowman has also contributed articles on Greek Jewry and other topics to a 15 encyclopedias, including The Oxford Dictionary of Byzantium, the Encyclopedia of the Holocaust and the Dictionary of Literary Themes and Motifs.

=== Books ===
- The Jews of Byzantium, 1204–1453. Alabama: University of Alabama Press, 1985. ISBN 0-8197-0703-1. paperback reprint New York, 2000.
- The Holocaust in Salonika: Eyewitness Accounts. New York: Sephardic House & Bloch Publishing Co, 2002. ISBN 0-8197-0753-8.
- Jewish Resistance in Wartime Greece, London: Vallentine Mitchell, 2006. ISBN 0-85303-598-9.
- The Agony of Greek Jews, 1940–1945 (Stanford University October 2009). ISBN 978-0-8047-7249-5. The book was optioned by independent filmmaker Dimitri Vorris for the feature film Land the Angels.
- An Annotated Translation of Sepher Yosippon. Preliminary studies of the work have appeared in the Proceedings of the American Academy for Jewish Research and elsewhere, most recently "Jewish Responses to Byzantine Polemics 9th-11th Centuries" in Shofar (2010).

=== Edited book ===
- Editor. Marco Nahon. Birkenau, the Camp of Death (with historical introduction by the editor) University of Alabama Press, 1991.
- Editor with Blanche Cody. In iure veritas. Studies in Canon Law in Memory of Schafer Williams. University of Cincinnati Press, 1991.
- Editor. S. Giora Shoham, Valhalla, Calvary & Auschwitz. Cincinnati and Tel Aviv, 1995.
- Editor. Michael Matsas, The Illusion of Safety. New York, Pella Press, 1997 (with editor’s bibliographic essay).
- Editor. Erwin Deutscher, Adventures on Three Continents. A Memoir. New York, Bloch Publishing Com., 2002.
- Editor. Moshe Ha-Elion, The Straits of Hell. The chronicle of a Salonikan Jew in the Nazi extermination camps Auschwitz, Mauthausen, Melk, Ebensee. Mannheim: Bibliopolis and Cincinnati: BCAP, 2005.
