= Pseudo-Hegesippus =

Pseudo-Hegesippus is the conventional name of the anonymous author of De excidio Hierosolymitano ("On the Destruction of Jerusalem"), a fourth-century Christian Latin adaptation of The Jewish War of Flavius Josephus. The text itself may also be referred to as "Pseudo-Hegesippus".

== The text ==
Although the author is sometimes termed a "translator", he never makes a claim to be translating either literally or freely. Rather, he considered himself an historian who used Josephus as his main source. The work is certainly too free to be considered a translation, as he frequently paraphrases and abridges. In addition, he adds passages based on other sources. As a whole it suggests the work of a rhetorician.

There are only five books, the first four corresponding to the first four of Josephus' War, but the fifth combines the fifth, sixth and seventh books of War. In addition, the author inserts some passages from Josephus' Antiquities, as well as some Latin authors. The Latin authors most frequently imitated are Virgil, Sallust, and Cicero. The Bible is used often as well, most often for rhetorical and literary purposes, but also for historiographical clarification.

It was printed in Paris in 1510. There is an edition by C. F. Weber and J. Caesar (Marburg, 1864). The most recent critical edition is Hegesippi qui dicitur historiae libri V, edited by Vincente Ussani in the Corpus Scriptorum Ecclesiasticorum Latinorum series, volume 66, Vienna: Hölder-Pichler-Tempsky (1932).

Pseudo-Hegesippus' work must not be confused with the literal Latin translation of War, which has seven books corresponding to the original Greek War. Traditionally, this latter translation has been attributed to Rufinus. However, it has been argued that the attribution to Rufinus must be incorrect, since Rufinus' translation of Eusebius of Caesarea's Historia Ecclesiastica quotes excerpts from War that are significantly different from the translated passages of the Latin War.

== Attribution ==
In the manuscripts of the work "Iosippus" appears quite regularly for "Josephus". It has been suggested that from a corruption of Iosippus an unintelligent reviser derived Hegesippus.

A more probable explanation is that the work was mistaken for the lost history of the Greek Christian author Hegesippus, which was also composed in five books. Some manuscripts attribute authorship to Ambrose of Milan.

The work began to circulate about the time of the death of Ambrose, then Bishop of Milan, in 398, or shortly after. A letter of St. Jerome (Epist. lxxi), written between 386 and 400, may bear witness to this, although it is also possible that Jerome refers here to the literal Latin translation of War, which was probably extant by that time. There is nothing to prove that Ambrose wrote this work at the end of his life. The various allusions, notably that to the defence of Britain by Count Theodosius (c. 368/9) are more readily explained if it is an earlier work.

Against the attribution to St. Ambrose:

- Vogel, De Hegesippo qui dicitur Iosephi interprete (Munich, 1880).
- Klebs, Festschrift für Friedländer (1895), p. 210.

For the attribution:

- Ihm, Studia Ambrosiana (Leipzig, 1889), p. 62.
- Landgraf, Die Hegesippus Frage in Archiv für lateinische Lexikographie und Grammatik, XII, p. 465.
- Ussani, La Questione e la critica del cosi detto Egesippo in Studi italiani di Filologia classica (Florence, 1906), p. 245.
