= Peter Morwen =

English clergyman and translator

Peter Morwen (1530?–1573?) was an English clergyman and Marian exile, known as a translator.

== Life ==
Morwen graduated B.A. from Magdalen College, Oxford, in 1550, and was elected a Fellow in 1552; in June next year he supplicated for the degree of M.A. A Protestant, he was expelled from his fellowship when Bishop Stephen Gardiner made a visitation of Oxford University in October 1553. He went to Germany.

On the accession of Elizabeth I Morwen returned home, was ordained deacon by Edmund Grindal on 25 January 1560, and was granted his master's degree at Oxford on 16 February. He became rector of Langwith, Nottinghamshire, in 1560; of Norbury, Derbyshire, in 1564, and of Ryton, Warwickshire, in 1556. Thomas Bentham was bishop of Lichfield and an old college friend: he made him Morwen his chaplain, and gave him a prebend in Lichfield Cathedral on 27 October 1567. A successor was appointed in the prebend on 6 March 1573, and Morwen probably died a month or two before.

== Works ==
Morwen translated into English the Josippon, Joseph Ben Gorion's "History of the Jews".' This work was for Richard Jugge the printer, and it must have been mainly accomplished while Morwen was an exile in Germany. The first edition was dated 1558, and had the title A compendious and moste marveylous History of the latter Times of the Jewes Commune Weale (London). Six other editions appeared. Morwen also rendered into English from the Latin, Conrad Gesner's Treasure of Euonymus A new edition A new Booke of Distillation of Waters, called the Treasure of Euonymus is dated 1565.

== Notes ==
Attribution

This article incorporates text from a publication now in the public domain: Lee, Sidney, ed. (1894). "Morwen, Peter". Dictionary of National Biography. Vol. 39. London: Smith, Elder & Co.
